= List of awards and nominations received by John Mulaney =

John Mulaney awards and nominations
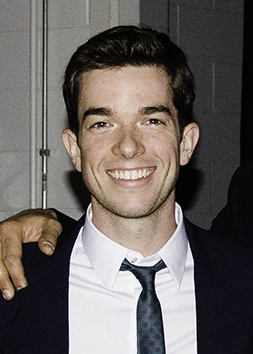
- Mulaney in 2013
Awards and nominations
| Award | Wins | Nominations |
| Peabody Award | 1 | 1 |
| Emmy Awards | 4 | 18 |
| Producers Guild Awards | 0 | 2 |
| Writers Guild Awards | 2 | 10 |

Totals (Note: Certain award groups do not simply award one winner. They acknowledge several different recipients, have runners-up, and have third place. Since this is a specific recognition and is different from losing an award, runner-up mentions are considered wins in this award tally. For simplification and to avoid errors, each award in this list has been presumed to have had a prior nomination.)
- Wins: 7
- Nominations: 19

This article is a List of awards and nominations received by John Mulaney.

John Mulaney is an American stand-up comedian, actor, writer and producer. He has received several awards including three Primetime Emmy Awards, a Peabody Award, and two Writers Guild of America Award as well as nominations for two Producers Guild of America Awards.

Mulaney is known for his work as a writer, and performer on the NBC sketch series Saturday Night Live and for his performance in Documentary Now!. He has been nominated for 18 Primetime Emmy Awards and won the Primetime Emmy Award for Outstanding Writing for a Variety Special twice for his Netflix standup specials John Mulaney: Kid Gorgeous at Radio City (2018), and John Mulaney: Baby J (2023).

He was the creator and star of the short-lived Fox sitcom Mulaney, a semi-autobiographical series about his life and voiced Andrew Glouberman in the Netflix original animated show Big Mouth (2017–present). Mulaney hosted the Netflix talk show John Mulaney Presents: Everybody's in LA (2024) for which he won the Television Critics Association Award for Outstanding Achievement in Variety, Talk or Sketch.

Mulaney also performed as a character called George St. Geegland in a comedic duo with Nick Kroll, most recently in Oh, Hello on Broadway from September 2016 through early 2017.

== Major awards ==
=== Emmy Awards ===
Primetime Emmy Awards
| Year | Category | Nominated work | Result | Ref. |
|---|---|---|---|---|
| 2009 | Outstanding Writing for a Variety Series | Saturday Night Live | Nominated | |
| 2010 | Outstanding Writing for a Variety Series | Saturday Night Live | Nominated | |
| 2011 | Outstanding Writing for a Variety Series | Saturday Night Live | Nominated | |
| 2011 | Outstanding Music and Lyrics | Saturday Night Live (song: "Justin Timberlake Monologue) | Won | |
| 2012 | Outstanding Variety Series | Saturday Night Live | Nominated | |
| 2012 | Outstanding Writing for a Variety Series | Saturday Night Live | Nominated | |
| 2012 | Outstanding Original Music and Lyrics | Saturday Night Live (song: "I Can't Believe I'm Hosting") | Nominated | |
| 2013 | Outstanding Writing for a Variety Special | Saturday Night Live Weekend Update Thursday | Nominated | |
| 2015 | Outstanding Writing for a Variety Special | Saturday Night Live 40th Anniversary Special | Nominated | |
| 2016 | Outstanding Writing for a Variety Special | John Mulaney: The Comeback Kid | Nominated | |
| 2017 | Outstanding Variety Sketch Series | Documentary Now! | Nominated | |
| 2018 | Outstanding Writing for a Variety Special | John Mulaney: Kid Gorgeous at Radio City | Won | |
| 2019 | Outstanding Writing for a Variety Series | Documentary Now! | Nominated | |
| 2019 | Outstanding Writing for a Variety Series | Saturday Night Live | Nominated | |
| 2019 | Outstanding Guest Actor in a Comedy Series | Saturday Night Live | Nominated | |
| 2019 | Outstanding Original Music and Lyrics | Documentary Now! (song: "Holiday Party (I Did A Little Cocaine Tonight)") | Nominated | |
| 2020 | Outstanding Variety Special (Pre-Recorded) | John Mulaney & the Sack Lunch Bunch | Nominated | |
| 2020 | Outstanding Writing for a Variety Special | John Mulaney & the Sack Lunch Bunch | Nominated | |
| 2023 | Outstanding Writing for a Variety Special | John Mulaney: Baby J | Won | |
| 2025 | Outstanding Writing for a Variety Special | SNL: 50th Anniversary Special | Won | |

=== Peabody Award ===
| Year | Category | Nominated work | Result | Ref. |
|---|---|---|---|---|
| 2009 | Peabody Award | Saturday Night Live | Won | |

=== Producers Guild Awards ===
| Year | Category | Nominated work | Result | Ref. |
|---|---|---|---|---|
| 2012 | Outstanding Producer of Live Entertainment & Talk Television | Saturday Night Live | Nominated | |
| 2013 | Outstanding Producer of Live Entertainment & Talk Television | Saturday Night Live | Nominated | |

=== Writers Guild Awards ===
| Year | Category | Nominated work | Result | Ref. |
|---|---|---|---|---|
| 2009 | Best Comedy/Variety Series | Saturday Night Live | Won | |
| 2010 | Best Comedy/Variety Series | Saturday Night Live | Won | |
| 2011 | Best Comedy/Variety Series | Saturday Night Live | Nominated | |
| 2012 | Best Comedy/Variety Series | Saturday Night Live | Nominated | |
| 2013 | Best Comedy/Variety Series | Saturday Night Live | Nominated | |
| 2014 | Best Comedy/Variety Series | Saturday Night Live | Nominated | |
| 2016 | Best Comedy/Variety (Music, Awards, Tributes) – Specials | Saturday Night Live 40th Anniversary Special | Nominated | |
| 2017 | Best Comedy/Variety – Sketch Series | Documentary Now! | Nominated | |
| 2017 | Best Comedy/Variety – Sketch Series | Maya & Marty | Nominated | |
| 2020 | Best Comedy/Variety – Sketch Series | Saturday Night Live | Nominated | |

== Miscellaneous awards ==
| Organizations | Year | Category | Work | Result | Ref. |
|---|---|---|---|---|---|
| Critics' Choice Super Awards | 2021 | Best Voice Actor in an Animated Series | Big Mouth | Nominated | |
| Dorian Awards | 2018 | TV Musical Performance of the Year | "I'm Gay" from Big Mouth | Nominated | |
| Hollywood Music in Media Awards | 2019 | Best Original Song – TV Show/Mini Series | "Holiday Party (I Did A Little Cocaine Tonight)" from Documentary Now! | Nominated | |
| MTV Movie & TV Awards | 2019 | Best Comedic Performance | Big Mouth | Nominated | |
| People's Choice Awards | 2024 | Comedy Act of the Year | John Mulaney: Baby J | Nominated | |
| Shorty Awards | 2019 | Best Comedian | | Won | |
| Television Critics Association | 2024 | Outstanding Achievement in Variety, Talk or Sketch | John Mulaney Presents: Everybody's in LA | Won | |
