= The Hall: Honoring the Greats of Stand-Up =

2022 comedy special

- Directed by: Marty Callner
- Written by: Chuck Sklar; Jeff Ross
- Produced by: Marty Callner; Randall Gladstein; David Steinberg
- Starring: Jon Stewart; John Mulaney; Pete Davidson; Chelsea Handler; Dave Chappelle
- Cinematography: Jay Lafayette
- Edited by: Michael D. Schultz
- Music by: Mix Master Mike
- Distributed by: Netflix
- Release date: May 1, 2022
- Running time: 64 minutes
- Country: United States
- Language: English

The Hall: Honoring the Greats of Stand-Up is a 2022 stand-up comedy film honoring four standup comedy legends, George Carlin, Robin Williams, Joan Rivers, and Richard Pryor. They were honored by Jon Stewart, John Mulaney, Chelsea Handler, and Dave Chappelle. Pete Davidson opened the show. The special was a part of Netflix is a Joke Fest comedy festival and was recorded live on May 1, 2022, at the Hollywood Palladium in Los Angeles.

== Premise ==
The premise of the special was inducting four stand-up comedians into "The Hall". In this special they honored George Carlin, Robin Williams, Joan Rivers, and Richard Pryor.

== Cast ==
In order of appearance:

- Pete Davidson
- Jon Stewart
- John Mulaney
- Chelsea Handler
- Jeff Ross
- Dave Chappelle

Archival footage:

- George Carlin
- Robin Williams
- Joan Rivers
- Richard Pryor

== Synopsis ==
- Pete Davidson opened the show making self-deprecating jokes including one about spray tanning himself.
- Jon Stewart honored George Carlin, referencing "Seven Words You Can Never Say on Television", Carlin's legacy, and his satirical humor—which has been linked to Lenny Bruce, and for which they were both labeled controversial, fined, and imprisoned due to obscenity laws.
  - Archival clips of Carlin's standup material followed Stewart's remarks.
- John Mulaney honored Robin Williams, referencing Nine Months (1995), The Fisher King (1991), and Good Morning, Vietnam (1987). Mulaney talked about Williams' ability to never phone it in in his standup comedy. He also quoted Zelda Williams, who was sitting in the audience.
  - Archival clips of Williams' standup material followed Mulaney's remarks.
- Chelsea Handler honored Joan Rivers, talking about her experience working with her on E!, her early work at the Greenwich Village, and her appearances on The Tonight Show. Handler credited Rivers for being a groundbreaking comedian paving the way for female comedians.
  - Archival clips of Rivers' standup material followed Handlers' remarks.
- Jeff Ross presented the In Memoriam segment which included Gilbert Gottfried, Louie Anderson, Bob Saget, Norm MacDonald and, jokingly, Will Smith.
- Dave Chappelle honored Richard Pryor calling him "the greatest stand up comedian that ever lived" and said "without Richard Pryor there would be no Dave Chappelle".
  - Archival clips of Pryor's standup material followed Chappelle's remarks.

== Release ==
The special was released on Netflix on May in 2022.

== Reception ==
Brian Logan, critic for The Guardian wrote, "As it is, the best moments come when the hosts deviate from the worshipful script", and "You’re thrown back, then, to the archive footage – not all of which has survived the ravages of time. But the best of it makes all this glorifying seem justified"
