= Alex Timbers =

American writer and director

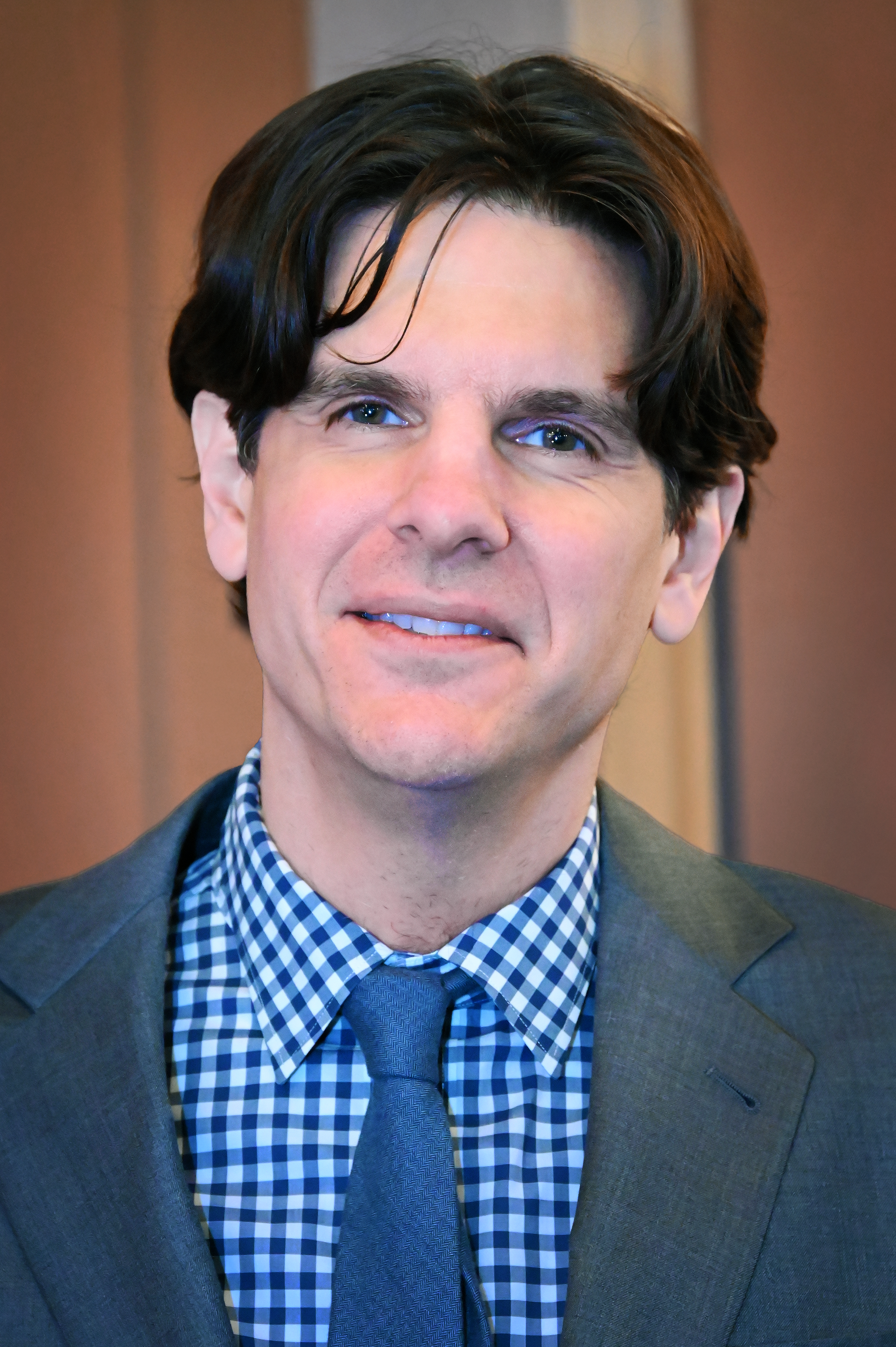
- Timbers in 2025
- Born: August 7, 1978 (age 48); New York City, U.S.
- Occupations: Playwright; director; producer
- Years active: 2003–present

Alex Timbers (born August 7, 1978) is an American writer and director best known for his work on stage and television. He has received numerous accolades including two Tony Awards, a Golden Globe Award, and a Drama Desk Award, as well as nominations for a Primetime Emmy Award and a Grammy Award. Timbers received the Drama League Founder's Award for Excellence in Directing and the Jerome Robbins Award for Directing.

Timbers received a Tony Award for Best Direction of a Musical for Moulin Rouge! and a Special Tony Award for David Byrne's American Utopia both at the 74th Tony Awards. He was nominated for two further Tony Awards for Bloody Bloody Andrew Jackson and Peter and the Starcatcher. Other Broadway credits include The Pee-wee Herman Show, Beetlejuice, Gutenberg! The Musical!, Here Lies Love, and Oh Hello! on Broadway, written by and starring comedians Nick Kroll and John Mulaney.

On television, he co-created the Amazon Prime Video series Mozart in the Jungle which won a 2016 Golden Globe Award. Timbers collaborated with comedian John Mulaney directing his Netflix specials Oh, Hello! (2017), John Mulaney: Kid Gorgeous at Radio City (2018) and John Mulaney: Baby J (2023), the latter of which earned him a Primetime Emmy Award for Outstanding Variety Special (Pre-Recorded) nomination.

== Early life and education ==
Timbers grew up in New York City. When he was 15, he moved to Illinois and attended Lake Forest High School. He then went to Yale University where he graduated magna cum laude. While at Yale, he was a member of the improvisational comedy group The Viola Question and president of the Yale Dramatic Association.

== Career ==
=== 2003–2009: Early work ===
Between 2003 and 2015, Timbers served as the Artistic Director of the award-winning, experimental theater company Les Freres Corbusier. Les Freres productions included Boozy: The Life, Death, and Subsequent Vilification of Le Corbusier and, More Importantly, Robert Moses, Dance Dance Revolution, Bloody Bloody Andrew Jackson, Hell House, Heddatron, and Hoover Comes Alive!. For Hell House, Timbers was nominated for a Drama Desk Award for Outstanding Theatrical Experience.

In 2003, Timbers conceived and directed the Les Freres show A Very Merry Unauthorized Children's Scientology Pageant, for which he and writer Kyle Jarrow won an Obie Award. Timbers also won two Garland Awards for the subsequent Los Angeles production, and his 2006 revival was heralded by The New York Times as the "Best Revival of the Year."

Timbers served as the second assistant director on the Broadway premiere of Jersey Boys in 2005.

For the Off-Broadway production of Gutenberg! The Musical!, Timbers was nominated for a 2007 Drama Desk Award for Best Director of a Musical. His production of Dixie's Tupperware Party was nominated for a Drama Desk Award for Outstanding Solo Performance in 2008.

=== 2010–2017: Breakthrough ===
In 2010, Bloody Bloody Andrew Jackson opened at the Public Theater to rave reviews with Timbers directing. The show was written by Timbers with music and lyrics by Michael Friedman. It returned to the Public the following year, extended three times, and became the second highest-grossing show in the institution's history. It transferred to the Bernard B. Jacobs Theatre on Broadway on September 20, 2010. The show won the Lucille Lortel Award and the Outer Critics Circle Award for Best Musical. Timbers won a Drama Desk Award for Outstanding Book of a Musical and was nominated for a Tony Award for Best Book of a Musical.

In Fall 2010, Timbers directed The Pee-wee Herman Show on Broadway, which was subsequently filmed for HBO.

In March 2011, Timbers co-directed with Roger Rees Peter and the Starcatcher for Disney at New York Theatre Workshop. The show opened to a positive review from Ben Brantley in The New York Times, and Timbers won the 2011 Obie Award for Direction. The production was the fastest-selling show in New York Theatre Workshop's history and extended three times. In March 2012, Timbers and Rees again co-directed Peter and the Starcatcher on Broadway. It was subsequently nominated for nine Tony Awards and won five. The show spawned two national tours and a year-long return engagement Off-Broadway.

In August 2013, Timbers and Bloody Bloody Andrew Jackson composer Michael Friedman reunited for a musical version of the play Love's Labour's Lost that appeared as part of Shakespeare in the Park at the Delacorte Theatre. It was nominated for a 2014 Drama Desk Award for Outstanding Musical.

In 2013 and again in 2014, Timbers directed Here Lies Love Off-Broadway at the Public Theater in New York City, an immersive club musical about Imelda Marcos featuring the music of David Byrne and Fatboy Slim, for which he won the Lucille Lortel Award for Best Director. The show was extended at the Public Theater three times, and made numerous year-end Best Of lists including The New York Times, The New York Post, The New York Daily News, Time, The Hollywood Reporter, Time Out, New York Magazine, and Vogue. He was also nominated for Drama Desk and Outer Critics Circle Awards for Best Director.

In 2014, Timbers directed Here Lies Love at the National Theatre in London. Timbers, Byrne, and Fatboy Slim won the London Evening Standard Beyond Theatre Award "for pushing the boundaries of musicals."

Also in 2014, Timbers directed the musical Rocky, based on the Oscar-winning film, on Broadway at the Winter Garden Theatre, for which he was nominated for Drama Desk Award and Outer Critics Circle Award for Best Director. Two years earlier, he directed a pilot production of the show in Germany, which ran for five years in Hamburg and Stuttgart.

Timbers was a co-creator with Jason Schwartzman, Roman Coppola, and Paul Weitz of the Amazon Studios series Mozart in the Jungle, which ran from 2014 to 2018 and won the 2016 Golden Globe Award for Best Television Series - Musical or Comedy. He served as co-executive producer on all episodes.

In 2016, Timbers directed an Off-Broadway revival of The Robber Bridegroom for Roundabout Theater Company, which won the 2016 Lucille Lortel Award for Best Revival.

In 2016, Timbers directed the comedy Oh Hello! on Broadway, written by and starring comedians Nick Kroll and John Mulaney. The show opened to positive reviews, recouped its capitalization, and was filmed for Netflix.

=== 2018–present ===
In 2018, Timbers directed and executive produced the television specials John Mulaney: Kid Gorgeous at Radio City. The same year, Timbers directed the out-of-town tryout of Beetlejuice at the National Theater in Washington DC. The next year, he directed the Broadway transfer of Beetlejuice at the Winter Garden Theater. The show was nominated for eight 2019 Tony Awards, including Best Musical.

Also in 2018, Timbers directed the out-of-town tryout of Moulin Rouge! The Musical, based on the Oscar-winning film, at the Emerson Colonial Theater in Boston. In July 2019, the show transferred to Broadway at the Al Hirschfeld Theater. The following year, the production was nominated for fourteen Tony Awards, winning ten including Best Musical. For his work on the production, Timbers won Best Director of a Musical and, for his work on the cast album, won a 2020 Grammy Award. The show also won Best Musical at the 2020 Outer Critics Circle Awards and the 2020 Drama League Awards, and Timbers won the 2020 Outer Critics Circle Award for Best Director of a Musical.

In September 2019, Timbers served as Production Consultant on David Byrne's American Utopia at the Emerson Colonial Theater in Boston. The next month, the show opened on Broadway at the Hudson Theater. American Utopia was called "the best live show of all time" by NME Magazine. The show recouped and was named to many critics' year-end top ten lists. The show was filmed for HBO and was nominated for six Emmy Awards. In 2020, Timbers directed Ben Platt Live from Radio City Music Hall (2020).

In Summer 2021, Beetlejuice made its international debut in South Korea at the Sejong Arts Center, staged and designed by the original Broadway creative team, in July 2021. It was nominated for 10 Korea Musical Awards, including Best Musical.

In September 2021, Moulin Rouge! The Musical re-opened on Broadway following a suspension due to the COVID-19 pandemic. That same month, American Utopia also re-opened on Broadway and received a 2021 Special Tony Award.

On November 12, 2021, Moulin Rouge! The Musical began performances simultaneously in Melbourne at the Regent Theatre and in London's West End at the Piccadilly Theatre. In May 2022, the Australian production opened in Sydney. In April 2022, Timbers directed the first national tour of Moulin Rouge! The Musical, which opened in Chicago at the James M. Nederlander Theatre. In October 2022, the German production of Moulin Rouge! The Musical opened in Cologne and in December 2022 the Korean production opened in Seoul, both directed by Timbers. A Japanese production began performances in Tokyo in 2023 An eighth production in the Netherlands premiered in 2024.

In April 2022, Beetlejuice re-opened on Broadway, now at the Marquis Theater. In November 2022, Timbers directed the first national tour of Beetlejuice, which premiered at San Francisco's Golden Gate Theater. The tour has consistently been among the top-grossing Broadway tours in various markets and recouped its investment in September 2023. An additional production aboard Norwegian Cruise Lines began in 2023.

In 2023, Timbers returned to Broadway with three shows: Here Lies Love at the Broadway Theater, Gutenberg! The Musical! at the James Earl Jones Theater, and he served as Creative Consultant for Alex Edelman: Just For Us at the Hudson Theater, which Timbers then subsequently directed as a special for HBO. The same year, he directed John Mulaney: Baby J (2023) for Netflix. John Mulaney: Baby J won the Critics' Choice Television Award for Best Comedy Special, and for his work on the special as an executive producer, Timbers was nominated for the Primetime Emmy Award for Outstanding Variety Special (Pre-Recorded).

His debut picture book, Broadway Bird, was published by Feiwel and Friends, an imprint of Macmillan, on May 24, 2022.

In the 2024 Broadway season, Timbers directed All In which was a play/reading of the same piece every night with a rotating cast of actors. In fall 2025, he directed a production of Bat Boy: The Musical at the New York City Center which ran from Oct 29 – Nov 9, 2025.

On December 12, 2025, the Timbers-directed play All Out: Comedy About Ambition premiered in the Nederlander Theatre. With the play running simultaneously with Beetlejuice, Moulin Rouge!, and Just in Time at the time, Timbers became the fourth ever director to have four shows on Broadway at once.

== Recognition ==
Sardi's Restaurant honored Timbers by unveiling a portrait of him for their famed wall of caricatures on July 20, 2022.

== Credits ==
=== Theatre ===
| Year | Project | Credit | Venue | Ref. |
|---|---|---|---|---|
| 2005 | Jersey Boys | Second Assistant Director | August Wilson Theatre | |
| 2010 | Bloody Bloody Andrew Jackson | Director / Bookwriter | Bernard B. Jacobs Theatre | |
| 2010 | The Pee-wee Herman Show | Director | Stephen Sondheim Theatre | |
| 2012 | Peter and the Starcatcher | Director | Brooks Atkinson Theatre | |
| 2014 | Rocky | Director | Winter Garden Theatre | |
| 2016 | Oh Hello! On Broadway | Director | Lyceum Theatre | |
| 2019 | Beetlejuice | Director | Winter Garden Theatre | |
| 2019 | Moulin Rouge! The Musical | Director | Al Hirschfeld Theatre | |
| 2019 | David Byrne's American Utopia | Creative Consultant | Hudson Theatre | |
| 2021 | Moulin Rouge! The Musical | Director | Al Hirschfeld Theatre | |
| 2021 | David Byrne's American Utopia | Creative Consultant | St. James Theater | |
| 2022 | Beetlejuice | Director | Marquis Theatre | |
| 2023 | Just For Us | Creative Consultant | Hudson Theatre | |
| 2023 | Here Lies Love | Director | Broadway Theatre | |
| 2023 | Gutenberg! The Musical! | Director | James Earl Jones Theatre | |
| 2024 | All In: Comedy About Love | Director | Hudson Theater | |
| 2025 | Just in Time | Director | Circle in the Square Theatre | |
| 2025 | Bat Boy: The Musical | Director | New York City Center | |
| 2025 | All Out: Comedy About Ambition | Director | Nederlander Theatre | |
| 2026 | Beetlejuice | Director | U.S. National Tour | |
| 2026 | Beetlejuice | Director | West End, Prince Edward Theatre | |
| 2026 | Broad Strokes | Director | Regional, Huntington Theatre Company | |
| 2026 | Broad Strokes | Director | Off-Broadway, Lucille Lortel Theatre | |

=== Television ===
| Year | Project | Credit | Notes | Ref. |
|---|---|---|---|---|
| 2011 | The Pee-Wee Herman Show on Broadway | Staging Director | HBO special | |
| 2014–2018 | Mozart in the Jungle | Co-creator / Co-Executive Producer / Writer | Amazon series; 40 episodes | |
| 2017 | Oh, Hello On Broadway | Staging Director / Executive Producer | Netflix comedy special | |
| 2018 | John Mulaney: Kid Gorgeous at Radio City | Director / Executive Producer | Netflix comedy special | |
| 2020 | Ben Platt Live from Radio City Music Hall | Director / Executive Producer | Netflix music special | |
| 2023 | John Mulaney: Baby J | Director / Executive Producer | Netflix comedy special | |
| 2024 | Alex Edelman: Just For Us | Director / Executive Producer | HBO comedy special | |
| 2026 | The Muppet Show | Director / Executive Producer | Disney+ comedy special | |

== Awards and nominations ==
| Year | Awards | Category | Work | Result | Ref. |
|---|---|---|---|---|---|
| 2004 | Obie Awards | Special Citations | A Very Merry Unauthorized Children's Scientology Pageant | Won | |
| 2007 | Drama Desk Award | Outstanding Director of a Musical | Gutenberg! The Musical! | Nominated | |
| 2007 | Drama Desk Award | Unique Theatrical Experience | Hell House | Nominated | |
| 2010 | Drama League Award | Outstanding Production of a Musical | Bloody Bloody Andrew Jackson | Nominated | |
| 2010 | Outer Critics Circle Awards | Best Off-Broadway Musical | Bloody Bloody Andrew Jackson | Won | |
| 2010 | Outer Critics Circle Awards | Outstanding Director of a Musical | Bloody Bloody Andrew Jackson | Nominated | |
| 2010 | Drama Desk Award | Outstanding Director of a Musical | Bloody Bloody Andrew Jackson | Nominated | |
| 2010 | Drama Desk Award | Outstanding Book of a Musical | Bloody Bloody Andrew Jackson | Won | |
| 2011 | Tony Awards | Best Book of a Musical | Bloody Bloody Andrew Jackson | Nominated | |
| 2011 | Lucille Lortel Awards | Outstanding Musical | Bloody Bloody Andrew Jackson | Won | |
| 2011 | Obie Awards | Direction | Peter and the Starcatcher | Won | |
| 2011 | Joe A. Callaway Award | Excellence in Directing | Peter and the Starcatcher | Nominated | |
| 2012 | Tony Awards | Best Direction of a Play | Peter and the Starcatcher | Nominated | |
| 2013 | Outer Critics Circle Awards | Outstanding Director of a Musical | Here Lies Love | Nominated | |
| 2013 | Drama Desk Award | Outstanding Director of a Musical | Here Lies Love | Nominated | |
| 2014 | Lucille Lortel Awards | Outstanding Director | Here Lies Love | Won | |
| 2014 | Evening Standard Theatre Awards | Beyond Theatre Award | Here Lies Love | Won | |
| 2014 | Outer Critics Circle Awards | Outstanding Director of a Musical | Rocky | Nominated | |
| 2014 | Drama Desk Award | Outstanding Director of a Musical | Rocky | Nominated | |
| 2014 | Drama Desk Award | Best Musical | Love's Labour's Lost | Nominated | |
| 2016 | Lucille Lortel Awards | Best Revival | The Robber Bridegroom | Won | |
| 2016 | Jerome Robbins Award | Excellence in Directing | | Won | |
| 2016 | Golden Globe Awards | Best Television Series – Musical or Comedy | Mozart in the Jungle | Won | |
| 2017 | Golden Globe Awards | Best Television Series – Musical or Comedy | Mozart in the Jungle | Nominated | |
| 2019 | Drama League Award | Founders Award for Excellence in Directing | | Won | |
| 2020 | Grammy Awards | Best Musical Theater Album | Moulin Rouge! The Musical | Nominated | |
| 2020 | Outer Critics Circle Awards | Outstanding Director of a Musical | Moulin Rouge! The Musical | Won | |
| 2021 | Tony Awards | Best Direction of a Musical | Moulin Rouge! The Musical | Won | |
| 2021 | Tony Awards | Special Tony Award | David Byrne's American Utopia | Won | |
| 2023 | Primetime Emmy Award | Outstanding Variety Special (Pre-Recorded) | Baby J | Nominated | |
| 2023 | Critics Choice Awards | Best Comedy Special | Baby J | Won | |
| 2024 | Drama League Awards | Outstanding Direction of a Musical | Gutenberg! The Musical! | Nominated | |
| 2024 | Drama League Awards | Outstanding Direction of a Musical | Here Lies Love | Nominated | |
| 2025 | Drama League Awards | Outstanding Direction of a Musical | Just in Time | Nominated | |
| 2025 | Drama Desk Awards | Outstanding Direction of a Musical | Just in Time | Nominated | |
| 2026 | Primetime Emmy Awards | Outstanding Variety Special (Pre-Recorded) | The Muppet Show | Won | |

== Bibliography ==
Timbers' debut picture book, Broadway Bird, set in an all-animal version of Broadway, was published by Feiwel and Friends, an imprint of Macmillan, on May 24, 2022.
