= John Mulaney =

American comedian, actor, and writer (born 1982)

- Mulaney in 2026
- Born: August 26, 1982 (age 44); Chicago, Illinois, U.S.
- Education: Georgetown University (BA)
- Spouses: Annamarie Tendler (m. 2014; div. 2022); Olivia Munn (m. 2024)
- Children: 2

Comedy career
- Years active: 2002–present
- Medium: Stand-up; television; film
- Genres: Observational comedy; sketch comedy; surreal humor; black comedy; satire
- Subjects: American culture; everyday life; social awkwardness; drug use; religion; pop culture
- Website: www.johnmulaney.com

John Edmund Mulaney (/məˈleɪniː/ mə-LAY-nee; born August 26, 1982) is an American stand-up comedian, actor, writer, and producer. Born and raised in Chicago, Illinois, Mulaney first rose to prominence for his work as a writer for the NBC sketch comedy series Saturday Night Live from 2008 to 2013, where he contributed to numerous sketches and characters, including Stefon, a recurring character whom he and Bill Hader co-created. Since his departure from SNL, Mulaney has hosted the program seven times, and became a member of the SNL Five Timers Club in 2022.

Mulaney's stand-up specials include The Top Part (2009), New in Town (2012), The Comeback Kid (2015), Kid Gorgeous (2018), and Baby J (2023). He won three Primetime Emmy Awards for Outstanding Writing for a Variety Special for Kid Gorgeous, Baby J, and SNL 50. Mulaney released a children's musical comedy special on Netflix, John Mulaney & the Sack Lunch Bunch (2019).

He was the creator and star of the semi-autobiographical Fox sitcom Mulaney, which aired for one season (2014–2015). Mulaney also performed as George St. Geegland in a comedic duo with Nick Kroll, appearing on television and on Broadway in the show Oh, Hello on Broadway (2016–2017). Mulaney serves as a co-executive producer, writer, and occasional actor in the IFC mockumentary series Documentary Now! (2015–2022). He hosted, created, and executive produced the Netflix talk show Everybody's in LA (2024) and its spinoff Everybody's Live with John Mulaney (2025).

Mulaney has appeared in guest roles in the Apple TV+ period series Dickinson (2019), the FX dramedy series The Bear (2023–2026), and the Peacock crime series Poker Face (2025). He also voiced Andrew Glouberman in the Netflix animated show Big Mouth (2017–2025), Peter Porker / Spider-Ham in Spider-Man: Into the Spider-Verse (2018), Chip in Chip 'n Dale: Rescue Rangers (2022), and Big Jack Horner in Puss in Boots: The Last Wish (2022).

== Early life and education ==
Mulaney was born on August 26, 1982, in Chicago, Illinois. Both of his parents are lawyers. His mother, Ellen Mulaney (née Stanton), is a professor at Northwestern University Pritzker School of Law, and his father, Charles W. Mulaney Jr., is a partner at Skadden, Arps, Slate, Meagher & Flom who had previously clerked for Federal Judge Edward Weinfeld (1901–1988). His parents are both of Irish Catholic heritage.

Chip and Ellen Mulaney attended Georgetown University and Yale Law School, the same school as future president Bill Clinton (Mulaney has said he met Clinton in 1992). Growing up, Mulaney served as an altar boy. He is the third of five children. He has an elder sister, an elder brother, a younger sister, and a younger brother who died at birth. His confirmation name is Martin, after St. Martin de Porres, to honor his late brother, Peter Martin, who died when Mulaney was four.

Mulaney's maternal great-grandparents were George J. Bates, a Republican mayor of Salem, Massachusetts, who also served as a congressman from that state, and Nora Jennings, who moved to the U.S. from Ballyhaunis, County Mayo, Ireland. His maternal great-uncle is William H. Bates, who also served as a U.S. congressman. Coincidentally, Mulaney's maternal grandmother, Carolyn Stanton, and Hilary Meyers, mother of Mulaney's future Saturday Night Live coworker Seth Meyers, performed together in a hospital benefit show in Marblehead, Massachusetts, called Pills A-Poppin' directed by Tommy Tune, then 19.

Mulaney credits Ricky Ricardo on the program I Love Lucy as inspiring his desire to go into show business at age five. By seven years old, he was a member of the Chicago-based children's sketch group "The Rugrats". Because of this, Mulaney had an opportunity to audition for the role of Kevin in the film Home Alone, but his parents declined.

During his junior high tenure at St. Clement School, Mulaney and his best friend, John O'Brien, would offer to perform what they had learned as a skit in lieu of writing reports. At 14, Mulaney played Wally Webb in a production of Our Town. He also frequented the Museum of Broadcast Communications, where he watched archived episodes of shows such as I Love Lucy and The Tonight Show Starring Johnny Carson.

In 2000, Mulaney graduated from St. Ignatius College Prep with a GPA "well in excess" of his graduating class's 3.84 average, according to Mulaney himself. He then enrolled at his parents' alma mater, Georgetown University. He has attributed his educational performance to grade anxiety in regard to college admissions and his decision to maximize easy A courses in his curriculum. Mulaney has also noted that he believes his credentials were not at the standard of his future alma mater, Georgetown University, and that his application was strongly biased by the university's well-known tradition of legacy admissions. At Georgetown he majored in English and minored in theology. He joined the school's improv group, and met Nick Kroll and Mike Birbiglia. He later joined Birbiglia on his stand-up tour, which Mulaney cited as helping him overcome his stage fright.

== Career ==
=== 2004–2014: Stand-up career and comedy writer ===
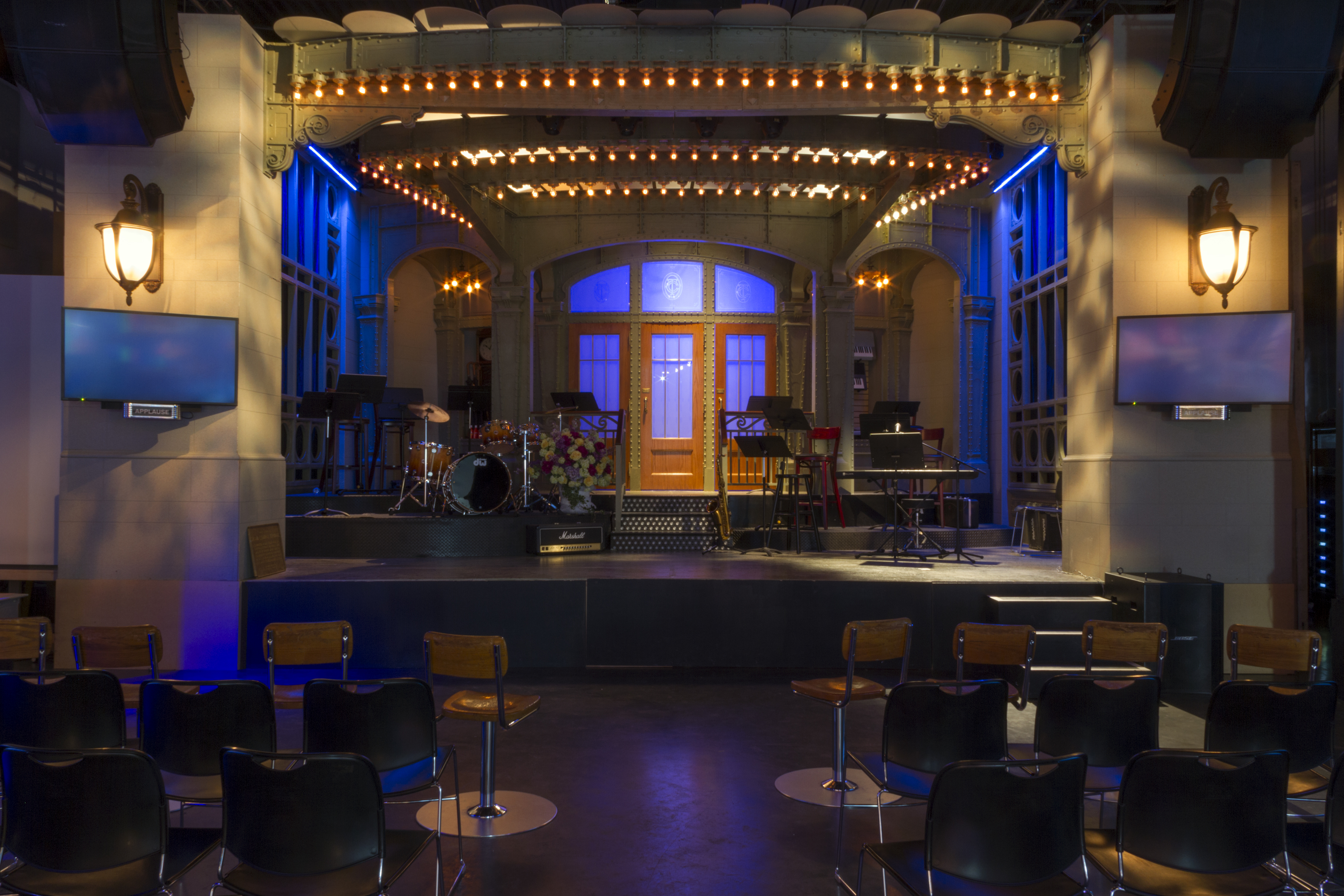
The main stage for Saturday Night Live

After graduating from Georgetown in 2004, Mulaney moved to New York City with ambitions of a career in comedy, and was hired as an office assistant at Comedy Central. After a year, he pitched the idea for a parody of I Love the '80s called I Love the '30s, which he developed along with fellow comedian Nick Kroll. Mulaney was working at the network when Dave Chappelle abruptly left. Initially, the network had planned to fly Mulaney out to Los Angeles to secure the tapes for season three of Chappelle's eponymous show; instead, feeling it was a "hindrance to being a comedian", Mulaney quit and started working freelance. After performing on Late Night with Conan O'Brien, Mulaney was asked to audition for Saturday Night Live in August 2008, along with Kroll, Donald Glover, Ellie Kemper, T.J. Miller, and Bobby Moynihan. He did not prepare any impressions, instead performing stand-up with "charactery bits in them". Mulaney went in with low expectations, but thought it would be a "cool story". He won a spot on the writing team, where he remained for four seasons, writing the monologues for the hosts. He also occasionally appeared on the show's Weekend Update segment. He and SNL actor Bill Hader co-created the recurring SNL character Stefon. Mulaney was nominated for the Primetime Emmy Award for Outstanding Writing for a Variety Series with the SNL writing staff from 2009 to 2012. He won a Primetime Emmy Award for Outstanding Original Music and Lyrics at the 2011 Emmys with Justin Timberlake, Seth Meyers, and Katreese Barnes.

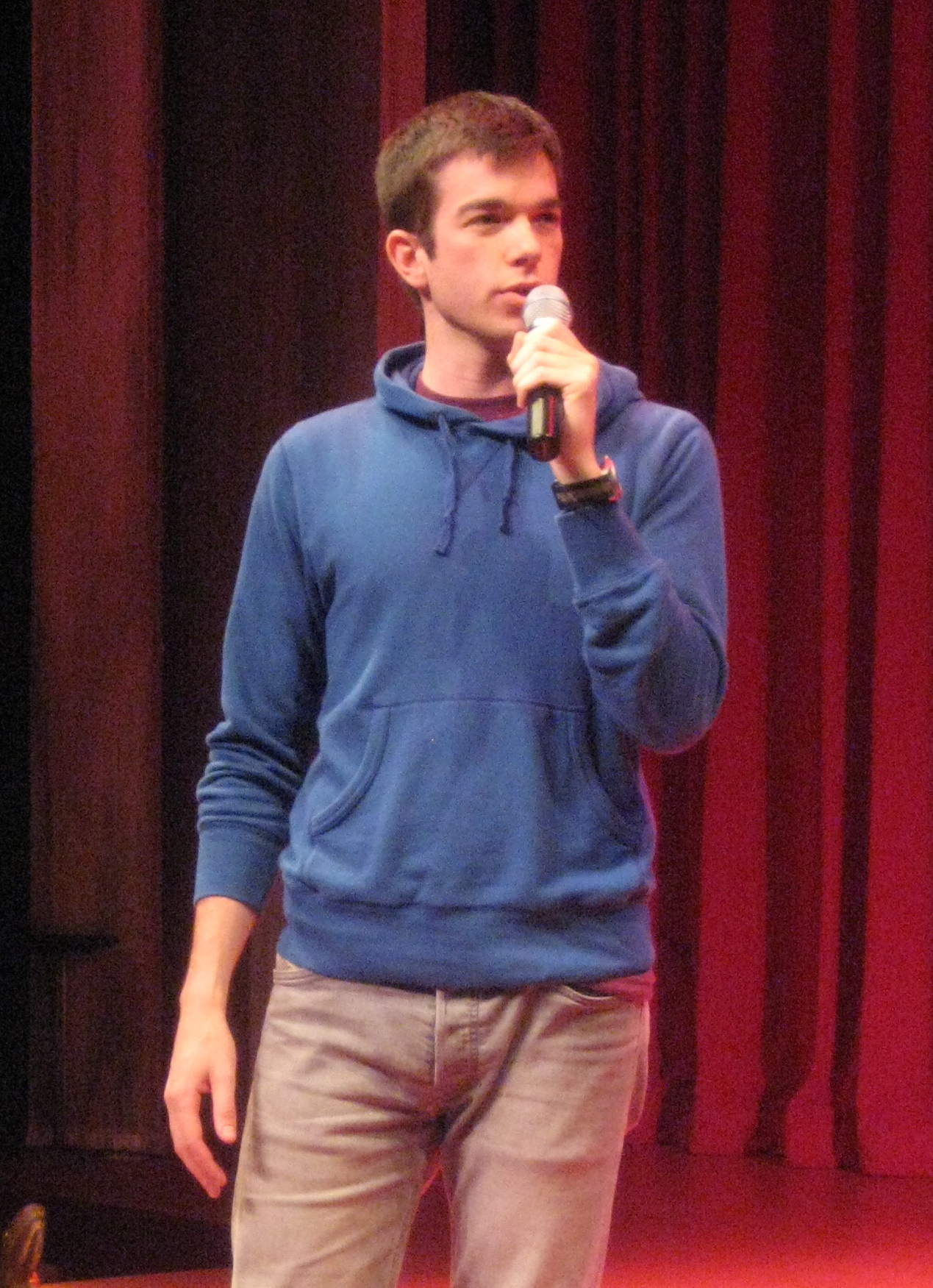
Mulaney performing in 2009

In addition to his work on SNL, Mulaney is a stand-up comedian. He has been a headliner since 2008. He performed at the 2008 Bonnaroo Music Festival. He has performed on Live at Gotham, Conan, Jimmy Kimmel Live!, Late Night with Jimmy Fallon, Late Night with Conan O'Brien, and Comedy Central Presents. Mulaney also released the comedy album The Top Part in 2009 and the stand-up comedy special New in Town in 2012. Both were produced with Comedy Central. In May 2013, NBC passed on picking up Mulaney's semi-autobiographical sitcom pilot, Mulaney. The following June, Fox ordered a new script while considering whether to order the production of several episodes. In October 2013, Fox announced that it had picked up the show for a six-episode season order. Mulaney was the creator, producer, and writer of his eponymous series. The series starred Mulaney, Nasim Pedrad, Martin Short, and Elliott Gould. The series was cancelled within its first year in May 2015. He has said he "wanted to do the type of live-audience multi-camera sitcoms that I grew up on". The series received poor reviews, including playwright and The New York Times TV critic Neil Genzlinger's, who wrote "It rips off Seinfeld so aggressively that in Episode 2 it even makes fun of its own plagiarism. But one thing it forgot to borrow from Seinfeld was intelligence."

=== 2015–2019: Career stardom ===
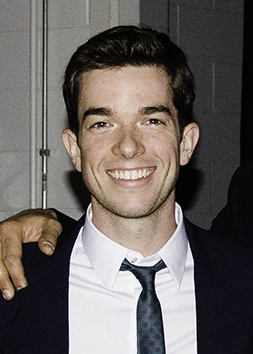
Mulaney in 2013

Mulaney's third comedy special, The Comeback Kid, was released on November 13, 2015, on Netflix. The Comeback Kid received critical acclaim, with David Sims of The Atlantic calling it "a reminder of everything that makes Mulaney so singular: storytelling rich with well-observed details, delivered with the confidence of someone decades older than 33". During this time, Mulaney contributed writing to other TV projects, including Maya & Marty; Documentary Now!; Oh, Hello on Broadway; and the Comedy Central Roast of James Franco. He acted in supporting roles on television shows such as Crashing, Portlandia, and Difficult People. In 2016, Mulaney received a nomination for the Primetime Emmy Award for Outstanding Writing for a Variety Special for The Comeback Kid, losing to Patton Oswalt's Talking for Clapping.

In 2015, Mulaney served as a writer for the IFC mockumentary series Documentary Now! (2015–2022). The series was created by Fred Armisen, Bill Hader, and Seth Meyers. During the first season he served as consulting producer before becoming a co-executive producer. The series satirizes acclaimed documentary films. Mulaney has written five of the episodes, including "The Eye Doesn't Lie" (The Thin Blue Line) which he co-wrote with Bill Hader in 2015, "The Bunker" (The War Room), "Parker Gail's Location Is Everything" (Swimming to Cambodia) and "Mr. Runner Up: My Life as an Oscar Bridesmaid, Parts 1 & 2" (The Kid Stays in the Picture), the latter two written with Hader both in 2016. He wrote the episode "Soldier of Illusion, Parts 1 & 2" (2022) which parodied the films of Werner Herzog. His first acting role on the show was in the 2019 episode "Original Cast Album: Co-Op" in Season 3. Mulaney co-wrote the episode and the songs with Meyers. In the episode, Mulaney plays the fictional Simon Sawyer, a character based on composer and lyricist Stephen Sondheim. The episode spoofs the landmark D. A. Pennebaker documentary Original Cast Album: Company (1970). The episode features a fictional ill-fated 1970 Broadway musical, Co-op, with songs detailing the joys and pains of a New York City housing cooperative. The episode featured performances from Renée Elise Goldsberry, Richard Kind, and Alex Brightman. The episode received widespread critical acclaim, with Esquire magazine writing, "'Original Cast Recording: Co-op' may be the best episode of the faux-documentary TV series yet".

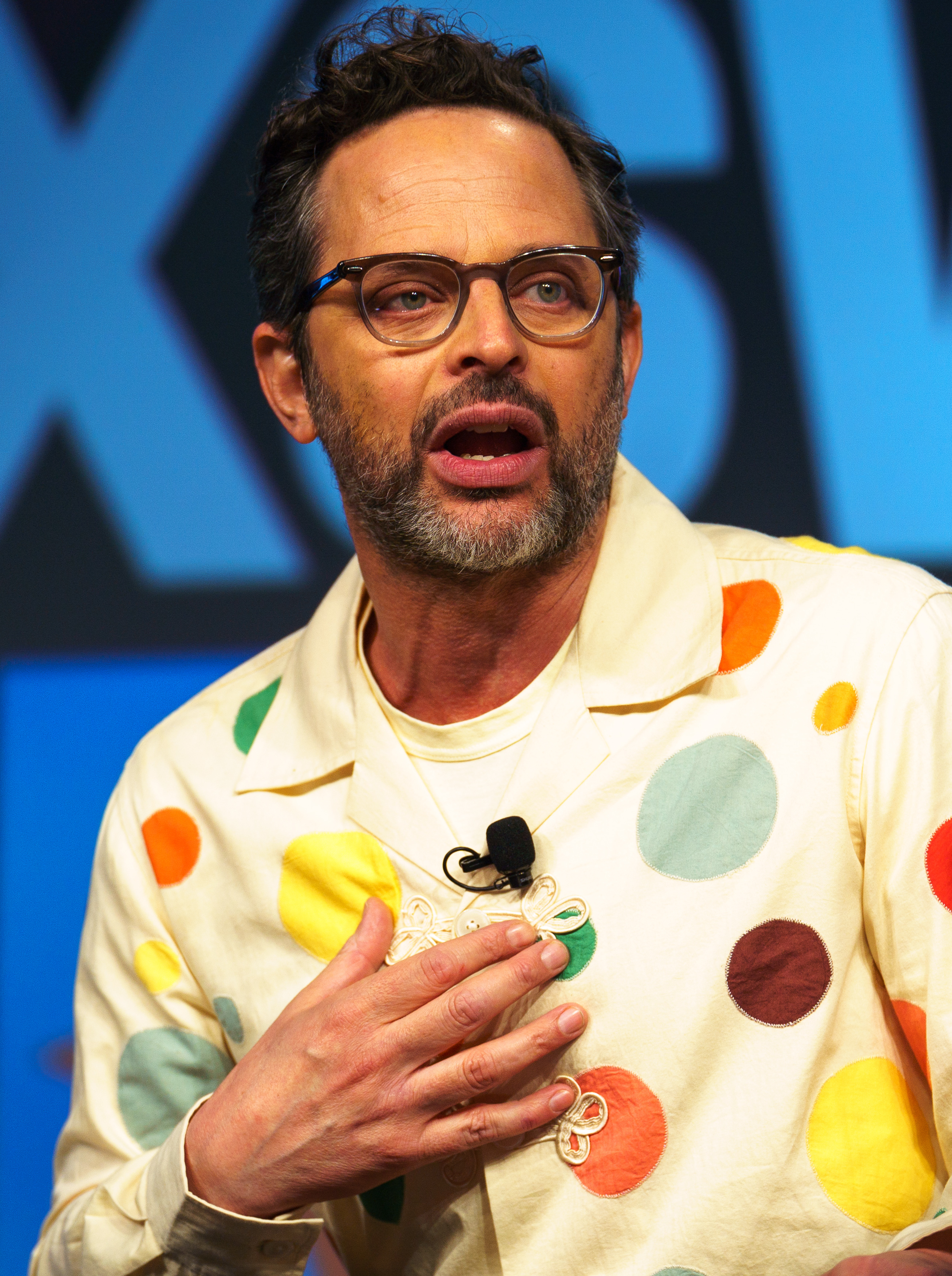
Mulaney collaborated with Nick Kroll on the Oh, Hello Show comedy act.

Mulaney has performed as the character George St. Geegland, an elderly man from the Upper West Side of New York, since the early 2000s. St. Geegland hosts a prank show called Too Much Tuna with fellow New Yorker Gil Faizon (portrayed by Georgetown classmate and comedian Nick Kroll) in which guests are given sandwiches with too much tuna fish. The characters were popularized on Kroll's Comedy Central series Kroll Show. Mulaney has toured the U.S. with Kroll in a show called Oh, Hello, with both in character as St. Geegland and Faizon, respectively. The show premiered on Broadway on September 23, 2016, and concluded its run on January 22, 2017. The Broadway production was filmed and released on Netflix on June 13, 2017. Steve Martin was the celebrity special guest, with a bonus clip showing Michael J. Fox as the guest. Matthew Broderick appeared as himself in a brief cameo toward the end of the special.

Mulaney's fourth stand-up comedy tour, Kid Gorgeous, kicked off its first leg in May 2017, concluding in July of that year. A second leg began in September 2017 in Colorado Springs, Colorado and concluded in April 2018 in Jacksonville, Florida. The tour featured seven shows at Radio City Music Hall in New York City in February 2018, one of which was filmed for another Netflix special. Kid Gorgeous met with critical acclaim, with Steve Greene of IndieWire calling it "one of the year's best pieces of writing". David Sims of The Atlantic praised Mulaney's talents as a stand-up, writing, "With Kid Gorgeous, Mulaney is proving he can endure in a field that even the most successful and talented comics can struggle to stay afloat in." At the 70th Primetime Emmy Awards, Mulaney received an Emmy for Outstanding Writing for a Variety Special for Kid Gorgeous.

In 2017, he was invited to appear alongside Steve Martin, Martin Short, Bill Murray, Jimmy Kimmel, and Norm MacDonald to honor David Letterman, who was accepting the Mark Twain Prize for American Humor at The Kennedy Center. When accepting the prize, Letterman said, "John Mulaney—this is the future of comedy, ladies and gentlemen." That same year, Mulaney was invited to appear to do stand-up at Jon Stewart's charity event Night of Too Many Stars (2017) on HBO, and Seth Rogen's charity event Hilarity for Charity (2018) on Netflix.

Mulaney provided the voice of a lead character on the animated Netflix series Big Mouth (2017–2025) alongside his writing partner Nick Kroll, who co-created the show. He co-hosted the Independent Spirit Awards ceremonies with Kroll in 2017 and 2018. In 2018, Mulaney provided the voice of Spider-Ham in Spider-Man: Into the Spider-Verse. He appeared in a Netflix and YouTube collaboration series hosted by Tan France, Dressing Funny, in June 2019. In November 2020, Late Night with Seth Meyers producer Mike Shoemaker announced that Mulaney had joined the show as a staff writer. Mulaney returned to voice Spider-Ham in the mobile game Marvel Contest of Champions, and the promotional animated short film Back on the Air.

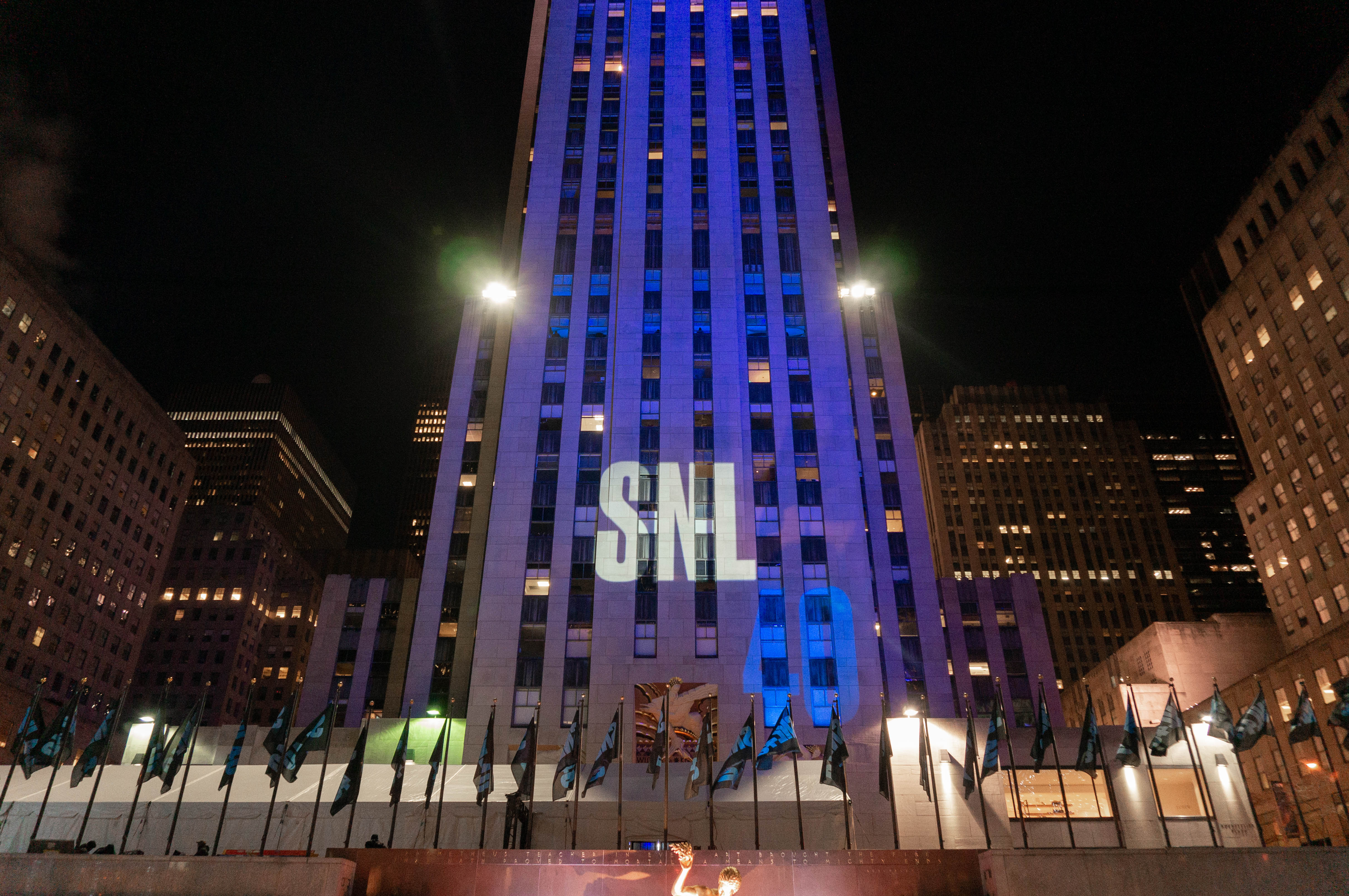
Mulaney returned to SNL as a host in 2018, ending up hosting seven times.

Mulaney returned to host Saturday Night Live seven times: on April 14, 2018; March 2, 2019; February 29, 2020; October 31, 2020; February 26, 2022; November 2, 2024 and November 14, 2026, making him the fourth SNL writer (after Conan O'Brien, Louis C.K., and Larry David) to host SNL. As host, he performed in elaborate musical number sketches including "Diner Lobster", "Bodega Bathroom", "Airport Sushi", "New York Musical", "Subway Churro", and "Port Authority Duane Reade". Mulaney joined Saturday Night Live's Five-Timers Club on February 26, 2022. Candice Bergen, Tina Fey, Elliott Gould, Paul Rudd, Steve Martin, and Conan O'Brien welcomed Mulaney into the club in an on-air sketch.

In January 2019, it was announced that Mulaney would tour with Pete Davidson for a limited series of comedy shows, "Sundays with Pete & John". Mulaney and Davidson had become close, appearing together on The Tonight Show with Jimmy Fallon and Saturday Night Live. In 2020, Mulaney interviewed actor and playwright André Gregory for the Chicago Humanities Festival; they talked about Gregory's memoir, This Is Not My Memoir, and discussed his life and career. In December 2019, Mulaney released a children's musical comedy special, John Mulaney & the Sack Lunch Bunch, on Netflix. The special was inspired by Sesame Street, Mister Rogers' Neighborhood, The Electric Company, Free to Be... You and Me, and 3-2-1 Contact. The special features Mulaney, along with 15 child actors and singers, aged 8 to 13. Celebrity cameos include André De Shields, David Byrne, Richard Kind, Natasha Lyonne, Annaleigh Ashford, and Jake Gyllenhaal as "Mr. Music". The special was critically praised with critic Alan Sepinwall of Rolling Stone Magazine comparing it favorably to Galaxy Quest, The Princess Bride, or Jane the Virgin as "one of those gems that manages to simultaneously parody a genre and be an excellent recreation of it". Mulaney was nominated for two Emmy Awards for Outstanding Variety Special (Pre-Recorded) and Outstanding Writing for a Variety Special.

=== 2020–2023: Recovery and on-screen expansion ===
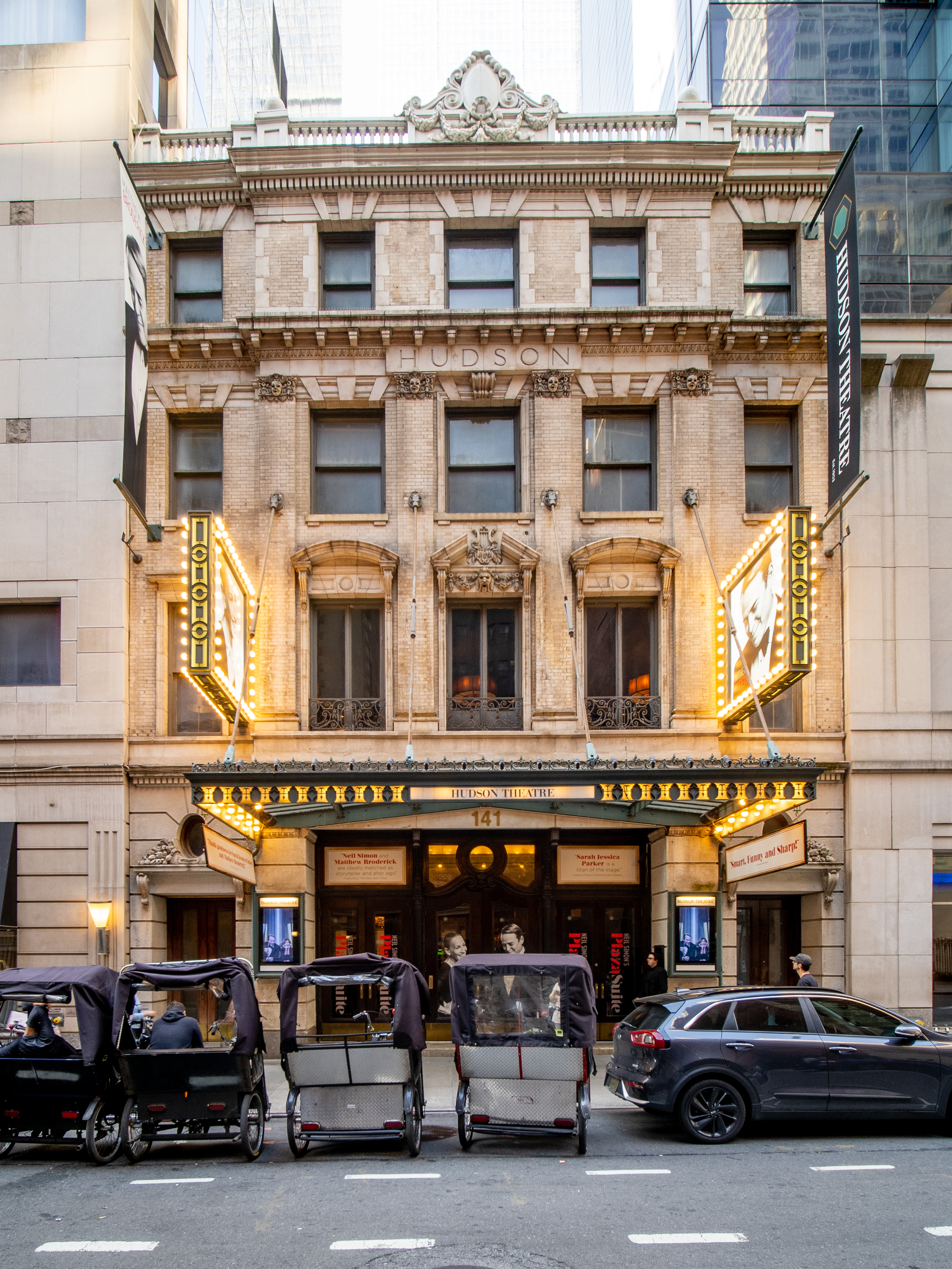
Mulaney returned to Broadway acting in the Simon Rich show All In: Comedy About Love (2024) at the Hudson Theatre.

In December 2020, Mulaney sought treatment for alcoholism, cocaine addiction, and prescription drug abuse in a 60-day program at a drug rehabilitation facility in Pennsylvania. In May 2021, Mulaney returned to stand-up comedy, working out new material titled John Mulaney: From Scratch. He performed several sold-out shows at City Winery in New York City before announcing a tour starting in Boston, where he sold out 21 shows. Mulaney's tour From Scratch was scheduled to run from March through June 2022 with 33 shows. Parts of the From Scratch routine were later used in Mulaney's 2023 special Baby J. Mulaney honored Robin Williams in the Netflix special The Hall: Honoring the Greats of Stand-Up, which was filmed at the Hollywood Palladium as part of the Netflix is a Joke Fest in Los Angeles. Mulaney appeared in the special alongside Jon Stewart, Dave Chappelle, Pete Davidson, and Chelsea Handler. In May 2022, during his From Scratch tour, Mulaney invited Chappelle to open his show, which drew criticism due to transphobic jokes Chappelle made.

In March 2023, it was announced that a new Netflix special from Mulaney, titled Baby J, was slated for release on April 25, 2023. A teaser trailer was released on April 17, 2023. The special, which was filmed in Boston, dealt primarily with Mulaney's visit to drug rehabilitation and his efforts toward sobriety. Variety noted that "the elephant in the room is acknowledged, but never tamed with a comprehensive account of when Mulaney relapsed, or why, or how his fame and fortune affected his addiction, or what it felt like to watch everything play out in the press." Multiple reviews, including Esquire, compared Baby J to Richard Pryor's 1982 special Live on the Sunset Strip in regard to how frank each was about the impact of their addictions. Mulaney concluded the special by reading and commenting on sections of a "wide-ranging" interview he gave with GQ while under the influence of cocaine, saying he did not remember the answers he had given. The interviewer, Frazier Tharpe, wrote a follow-up piece released the same day as the special.

In 2023 he appeared as himself in the episode "Borgnine" of the Pete Davidson series Bupkis on Peacock. He is a guest star in multiple episodes of the Hulu series The Bear as Stevie, partner to the character Michelle Berzatto.

=== 2024–present: Everybody's in LA, Broadway return and Mister Whatever tour ===
In April 2024, he announced a six part series called John Mulaney Presents: Everybody's in LA, to be live streamed on Netflix for six nights during the Netflix is a Joke Festival in early May 2024. The series was well reviewed with Alison Herman of Variety describing the series as a "pop-up talk show", adding "with Everybody's in LA Mulaney is back on more comfortable ground: a throwback vehicle for exploring highly personal hobby horses, casting himself as a self-effacing but still smoothly composed master of ceremonies". On September 9, 2024, it was announced that Mulaney would return to Broadway in the Simon Rich play All In: Comedy About Love acting opposite Fred Armisen, Richard Kind, Renée Elise Goldsberry, and Chloe Fineman. The play was directed by Alex Timbers and ran in the winter at the Hudson Theatre. In 2025, Mulaney served as a writer on the NBC television special, Saturday Night Live 50th Anniversary Special where he also served as a co-host with Steve Martin and performed in sketches.

In April 2025, Mulaney announced the Mister Whatever tour. The first leg of the tour was scheduled across the United States and parts of Canada. While some shows were performed alone, Mulaney occasionally was joined by guests like Nick Kroll, Fred Armisen, Mike Birbiglia, Pete Davidson, Jon Stewart, and Martin Short.

On September 24, 2025, Mulaney joined baseball broadcaster Jon Sciambi at a Chicago Cubs game to announce that he would be the first comedian to headline Wrigley Field. The comedian's hometown performance was set for July 11, 2026.

In October 2025, Mulaney partnered with Years, a non-alcoholic beer brand from Chicago. He appeared in multiple comedic ads for the brand, ultimately becoming its spokesperson.

== Influences ==
When asked about his comedy influences, he said that he "always loved stand-up albums ... growing up in the '90s, I would sit on the floor with my Discman and listen to comedy albums that I bought". Mulaney is a longtime collector of stand-up albums. He has mentioned loving Chris Rock's Bring the Pain (1996) and Bigger & Blacker (1999), Woody Allen's Comedian (1965), Nichols and May's Mike Nichols & Elaine May Examine Doctors (1961), and Albert Brooks's Comedy Minus One (1973). He has mentioned listening to a lot of Jerry Seinfeld, Dave Chappelle, George Carlin, Richard Pryor, Conan O'Brien and Bob Newhart. When asked about his top four comedy albums, Mulaney once again cited Rock's Bring the Pain, Mitch Hedberg's Strategic Grill Locations (1999), Eddie Izzard's Dress to Kill (1998), and Dave Attell's Skanks for the Memories... (2003).

== Personal life ==
=== Marriages and relationships ===
On July 5, 2014, Mulaney married multimedia artist Annamarie Tendler. Their friend Dan Levy performed their wedding ceremony. Their separation was announced in May 2021 and they divorced in January 2022.

In September 2021, Mulaney announced that he and his girlfriend, actress Olivia Munn, were expecting a child. On November 24, 2021, their first child, a son, was born. Mulaney and Munn married in July 2024 in New York. Their second child, a daughter, was born via surrogate on September 14, 2024. They live in Orange County, California.

=== Substance use issues ===
Mulaney has discussed onstage his struggles with substance use. He has stated that he started smoking at age 13, and quit when he was 39. In a 2014 interview, he said he had been sober since September 22, 2005. In his first appearance on television in 2021, Mulaney said he had checked into a rehabilitation facility in September 2020, left the recovery program, hosted Saturday Night Live in October, and relapsed after the show. Seth Meyers, Fred Armisen, Bill Hader, Nick Kroll, Natasha Lyonne and other friends then staged an intervention for Mulaney preceding his December 2020 rehab stint. In December 2020, Mulaney checked into a drug rehabilitation center for alcoholism, cocaine dependence, and prescription drug addiction. He moved into outpatient care in February 2021.

=== Religious and political views ===
In a 2014 appearance on WTF with Marc Maron, he said his religious views more closely aligned with Judaism than the Catholic ideas of his upbringing. In a 2020 Desus & Mero interview, he described himself as an atheist.

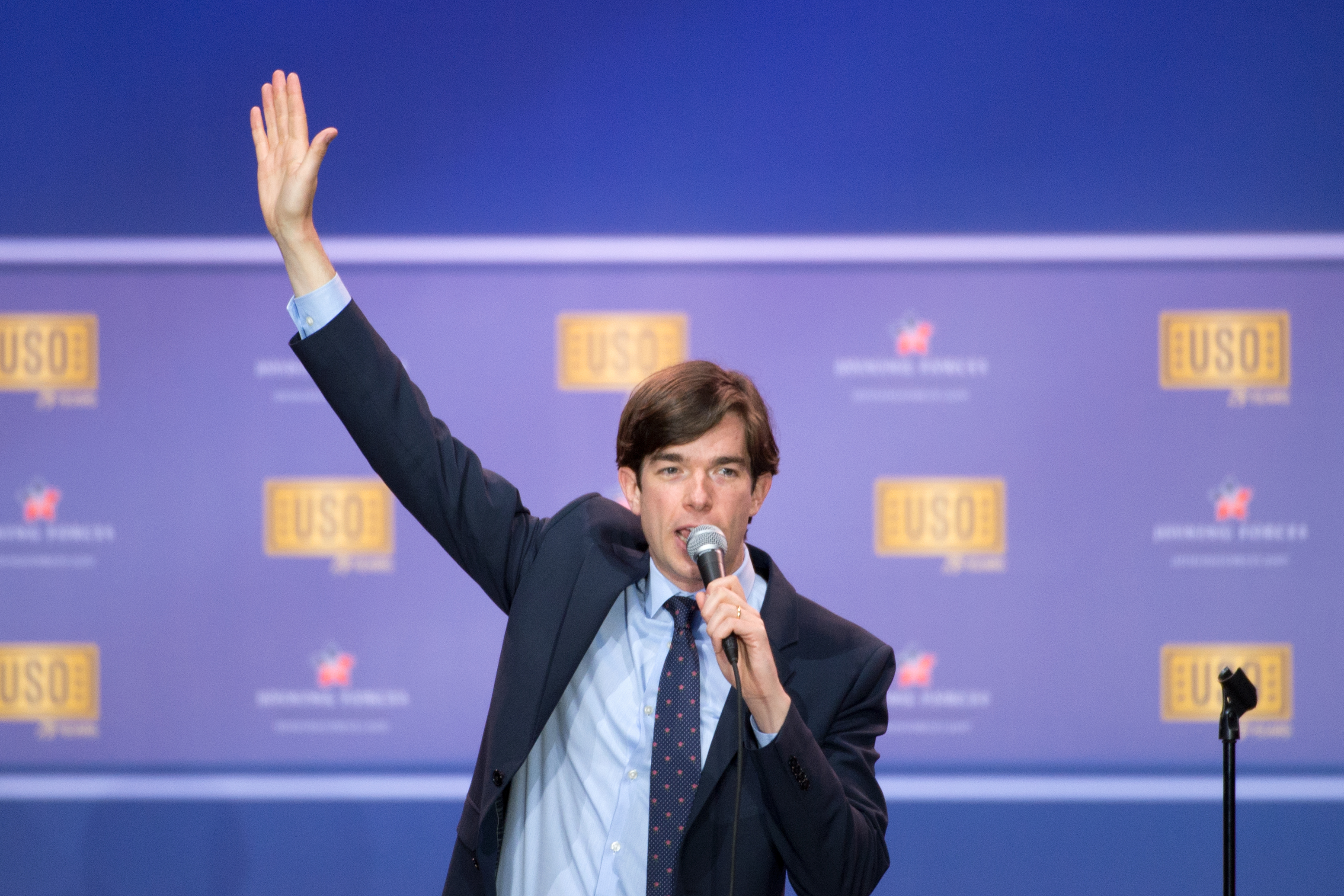
Mulaney performing at a Joining Forces event at Joint Base Andrews in 2016

In 2016, Mulaney appeared at an event honoring the Armed forces at Joint Base Andrews, "A Celebration of Service", organized by the USO. He performed stand-up comedy alongside comedians Jon Stewart, Hasan Minhaj, Mike Birbiglia, Kristen Schaal, and David Letterman. Also in attendance were then president Barack Obama, First Lady Michelle Obama, Vice President Joe Biden, and Second Lady Jill Biden.

While hosting Saturday Night Live on February 29, 2020, Mulaney noted that Julius Caesar was stabbed by the Senate for being a maniac, and joked, "That would be an interesting thing if we brought that back now!", in reference to Donald Trump. This joke led to him being investigated by the United States Secret Service. A Secret Service agent contacted NBC on March 2 to try to get in touch with Mulaney's lawyers but ultimately did not contact him and recommended no action, closing the file on March 5, 2020.

In a 2019 Esquire magazine interview, Mulaney said he had donated to Bernie Sanders's 2016 presidential campaign. On June 2, 2020, he was seen at a Black Lives Matter protest in Washington D.C.

In June 2021, Mulaney appeared alongside Alexandria Ocasio-Cortez as openers for a concert featuring the Strokes, which served as a fundraiser for New York City mayoral candidate Maya Wiley. During the 2023 Writers Guild of America strike, Mulaney was set to host a panel with Jon Stewart, to promote his comedy special Baby J. Mulaney cancelled the event in solidarity with fellow Guild members and amid strike rules that prohibited members from making "For Your Consideration" appearances until an agreement was reached.

== Filmography ==
=== Film ===
Key
†	Denotes works that have not yet been released

Year	Title	Role	Notes	Ref.
2018	Spider-Man: Into the Spider-Verse	Peter Porker / Spider-Ham	Voice, film debut	
2019	Spider-Ham: Caught in a Ham	Peter Porker / Spider-Ham	Voice; short film	
2020	Spider-Ham: Back on the Air	Peter Porker / Spider-Ham	Voice; short film	
2022	Chip 'n Dale: Rescue Rangers	Chip	Voice	
2022	Puss in Boots: The Last Wish	"Big" Jack Horner	Voice	
2023	Spider-Man: Across the Spider-Verse	Peter Porker / Spider-Ham	Voice; archive audio	
2025	Are We Good?	Himself	Documentary film	
2026	Lorne	Himself	Documentary film	
2026	Marty, Life Is Short	Himself	Documentary film	
2026	Madden	Trip Hawkins		
2027	Spider-Man: Beyond the Spider-Verse †	Peter Porker / Spider-Ham	Voice; In production	

=== Television ===
Year	Title	Role	Notes	Ref.
2007	Human Giant	Various	Episode: "24 Hour Marathon"	
2008	Best Week Ever	Himself	4 episodes	
2008–2018	Saturday Night Live	Various	Writer (94 episodes) and producer (22 episodes)	
2009	Important Things with Demetri Martin	John Mulaney/Green Beret	2 episodes; also writer	
2009	Comedy Central Presents	Himself	Episode: "John Mulaney"	
2010	Ugly Americans	Tony	Voice; 2 episodes	
2013–2015	Kroll Show	George St. Geegland	11 episodes	
2014–2015	Mulaney	John Mulaney	13 episodes; also creator, executive producer, and writer	
2015–2016	The Jim Gaffigan Show	Himself	4 episodes	
2015–2022	Documentary Now!	Simon Sawyer	Actor (Episode: "Original Cast Album: Co-op"); Also writer (season 1–4); producer (season 1–2)	
2016	Lady Dynamite	James Earl James	Episode: "Pilot"	
2016	Comedy Bang! Bang!	George St. Geegland	Episode: "The Lonely Island Wear Dark Pants and Eyeglasses"	
2016	Maya & Marty	—N/a	6 episodes; Writer	
2016	Difficult People	Cecil Jellford	Episode: "Unplugged"	
2017	32nd Independent Spirit Awards	Himself (host)	Television special	
2017–2025	Big Mouth	Andrew Glouberman/various	Voice; also consulting producer	
2018	Portlandia	George St. Geegland	Episode: "Peter Follows P!nk"	
2018	33rd Independent Spirit Awards	Himself (host)	Television special	
2018	Seth Rogen's Hilarity for Charity	Himself	Television special	
2018	Comedians in Cars Getting Coffee	Himself	Episode: "A Hooker in the Rain"	
2018	Animals	Olafur / Mackerel	Voice; episode: "Pigeons"	
2018–2019	Crashing	Himself	2 episodes	
2018–2026	Saturday Night Live	Himself (host)	7 episodes	
2019	Dickinson	Henry David Thoreau	2 episodes	
2019	Patriot Act with Hasan Minhaj	Himself	Deep Cut appearance	
2019–2022	The Simpsons	Warburton Parker	Voice; 2 episodes	
2020	Late Night with Seth Meyers	—N/a	Writer	
2020	The Not-Too-Late Show with Elmo	Himself	Episode #1.3	
2021	House Hunters: Comedians on Couches Unfiltered	Himself	Episode: "John Mulaney: Dance Space"	
2022	The Hall: Honoring the Greats of Stand-Up	Himself	Netflix comedy special	
2022	Human Resources	Andrew Glouberman	Voice; episode: "The Addiction Angel"	
2023	Bupkis	Himself	Episode: "Borgnine"	
2023–2026	The Bear	Stevie	4 episodes	
2024	My Next Guest Needs No Introduction	Himself	Episode: "John Mulaney"	
2024	John Mulaney Presents: Everybody's in LA	Himself (host)	Netflix talk show; 6 episodes	
2025	Saturday Night Live 50th Anniversary Special	Himself	Television special; also writer	
2025	Everybody's Live with John Mulaney	Himself (host)	Netflix talk show	
2025	Conan O'Brien: The Mark Twain Prize for American Humor	Himself (presenter)	Television special	
2025	Poker Face	Daniel Clyde-Otis	Episode: "Whack-A-Mole"	

=== Specials ===
Year	Title	Studio	Format	Ref.
2009	The Top Part	Comedy Central	Streaming/LP	
2012	New In Town	Comedy Central	Streaming/LP/DVD	
2015	The Comeback Kid	Netflix	Streaming/LP/DVD	
2017	Oh, Hello On Broadway	Netflix	Streaming	
2018	Kid Gorgeous At Radio City	Netflix	Streaming/LP/DVD	
2019	John Mulaney & the Sack Lunch Bunch	Netflix	Streaming/LP	
2023	Baby J	Netflix	Streaming/LP	

=== Theatre ===
Year	Title	Role	Playwright	Venue	Ref.
2015	Oh, Hello Live! On (off) Broadway	George St. Geegland	John Mulaney & Nick Kroll	Cherry Lane Theatre, Off-Broadway	
2016	Oh, Hello On Broadway	George St. Geegland	John Mulaney & Nick Kroll	Lyceum Theatre, Broadway	
2024	All In: Comedy About Love	Performer	Simon Rich	Hudson Theatre, Broadway	

=== Video games ===
Year	Title	Role	Notes
2020	Marvel Contest of Champions	Spider-Ham	

== Discography ==
Stand-up specials

- The Top Part (Comedy Central Records, 2009)
- New in Town (Comedy Central Records, 2012)
- The Comeback Kid (Drag City, 2017)
- Kid Gorgeous At Radio City (Drag City, 2018)
- Baby J (Drag City, 2023)

Musical

- Co-Op (Lakeshore Records, 2019)
- John Mulaney & the Sack Lunch Bunch (Drag City, 2019)

Touring

- John Mulaney: The Comeback Kid (2014–2015)
- John Mulaney: Kid Gorgeous (2017–2018)
- Sundays with Pete and John (2019)
- John Mulaney: From Scratch (2021–2023)
- John Mulaney: In Concert (2024)
- John Mulaney: Mister Whatever (2025–2026)

== Awards and nominations ==
Mulaney has received numerous award nominations and wins for his work in television. In 2009, Mulaney won a Peabody Award alongside the writers of Saturday Night Live for their satirical work on the 2008 United States presidential election. He has received many Primetime Emmy Award nominations (and won four), including for his work on Saturday Night Live and Documentary Now! In 2011, Mulaney won his first Emmy Award for co-writing the song "Justin Timberlake Monologue" with Seth Meyers and Justin Timberlake, which aired on Saturday Night Live. He won his second Emmy in 2018 for Outstanding Writing for a Variety Special for his stand-up special John Mulaney: Kid Gorgeous at Radio City.
