= John Mulaney: Baby J =

Stand-up comedy special by John Mulaney

- Teaser poster for the special
- Directed by: Alex Timbers
- Written by: John Mulaney
- Starring: John Mulaney
- Cinematography: Cameron Barnett
- Music by: David Byrne
- Distributed by: Netflix
- Release date: April 25, 2023
- Running time: 80 minutes
- Country: United States
- Language: English

John Mulaney: Baby J (stylized as John Mulaney: "Baby J") is a 2023 stand-up comedy film written by and starring John Mulaney. It was recorded in February 2023 at the Boston Symphony Hall and was released by Netflix on April 25, 2023. It is Mulaney's fifth stand-up special and was released five years after his fourth, Kid Gorgeous at Radio City (2018). The special consists of Mulaney recollecting his life experiences and escapades surrounding his drug addiction, including his intervention and subsequent rehabilitation.

The special received positive reviews from critics, who praised Mulaney's storytelling, honesty and deconstruction of likability, though was criticized by some for the perceived shorthanded approach to the subject matter.

For the special, Mulaney received the Primetime Emmy Award for Outstanding Writing for a Variety Special, and the special as a whole was nominated for the Primetime Emmy Award for Outstanding Variety Special (Pre-Recorded).

== Synopsis ==
The show forgoes a traditional opening, beginning with Mulaney already onstage. He begins by talking about his need for attention, and how as a child he used to pray that one of his grandparents would die, so he could receive sympathy from his classmates. He apologizes for starting the show on such a dark note, before launching into an a cappella song about how his reputation changed following his relapse. He talks to a fifth grader in the audience, explains that he has "kind of a different vibe now", and tells the child never to do what he describes in the performance.

He launches into a routine about the night of his intervention, to which he arrived two hours late because he was busy purchasing drugs and getting a haircut from the makeup department at his former workplace, Saturday Night Live. After describing the "star-studded" intervention, he reveals that while he is grateful to them for intervening, he still harbors some resentment towards so many of his friends for participating, because he feels indebted to all of them for saving his life, and it is too many people to feel this way towards.

A brief bit about iCloud text messages prefaces a routine about arriving at rehab, where his drugs, street drugs and prescription drugs alike, are confiscated. He describes obtaining the prescription medications by going on WebMD and finding the lowest-rated doctor in his area, whom he calls "Dr. Michael". Dr. Michael practiced out of his apartment, acted suspiciously, and had Mulaney take off his shirt so Dr. Michael could give Mulaney shots. Mulaney tolerated this behavior because the doctor wrote any prescription Mulaney wanted.

Mulaney returns to the subject of rehab and a nurse who, due to how his name appeared on Mulaney's phone, mistook Pete Davidson for Al Pacino and woke Mulaney up to take the call. He tells several other stories from rehab including getting in trouble for ordering Outback Steakhouse and being disappointed no one recognized him while there. After bits about his childhood alcohol usage, and ending his relationship with his drug dealer, he details the "most desperate thing" he did to get drugs. He tells the story of buying a Rolex watch just to pawn it for quick cash, ultimately receiving six thousand dollars for a twelve thousand dollar watch. Mulaney stated in the special that his life had significantly improved, but as a reminder of how bad things got, he reads from a GQ interview from four days before his intervention that he has "absolutely no recollection of giving".

The special ends with a list of all the people at his intervention, thanking them for saving his life. The list includes Fred Armisen, Mike Birbiglia, Bill Hader, Nick Kroll, Natasha Lyonne, Seth Meyers, and Marika Sawyer.

== Reception ==
=== Critical response ===
The special received positive reviews from critics. On the review aggregator Rotten Tomatoes, it has an approval rating of 86%, with an average score of 7.6 out of 10. The website's consensus reads, "Bearing the baggage of public scrutiny, John Mulaney reintroduces himself in a special that turns personal turmoil into comedic gold."

David Sims of The Atlantic gave the special a positive review, stating "There’s undoubtedly a lot more weight on Mulaney's shoulders, and more retrospection in his storytelling. But few comedians are currently working with his kind of natural talent." Proma Kholsa of IndieWire also gave a positive review, stating "'Baby J' will charm new and old fans – while never letting them lose sight of the flawed, fallible human being at its center." Likewise, Ethan Brehm of Popzara called the film a "masterpiece of monology" and saw Mulaney's seamless narrative as a return to form for the art of stand-up as a whole, posing that the comedian "hearkens back to decades long ago when we would spin a comedy album, not necessarily so we could memorize jokes, but because we were captivated with the subject matter."

=== Accolades ===
Awards and nominations received by John Mulaney: Baby J
| Award | Date of ceremony | Category | Recipient(s) | Result | Ref(s) |
|---|---|---|---|---|---|
| Critics' Choice Television Awards | January 14, 2024 | Best Comedy Special | John Mulaney: Baby J | Won | |
| People's Choice Awards | February 18, 2024 | The Comedy Act of the Year | John Mulaney | Nominated | |
| Primetime Emmy Awards | January 6–7, 2024 | Outstanding Writing for a Variety Special | John Mulaney | Won | |
| Primetime Emmy Awards | January 6–7, 2024 | Outstanding Variety Special (Pre-Recorded) | John Mulaney, John Foy, Jim Jagels, and Alex Timbers | Nominated | |
