= Anna Marie Tendler =

American artist and author (born 1985)

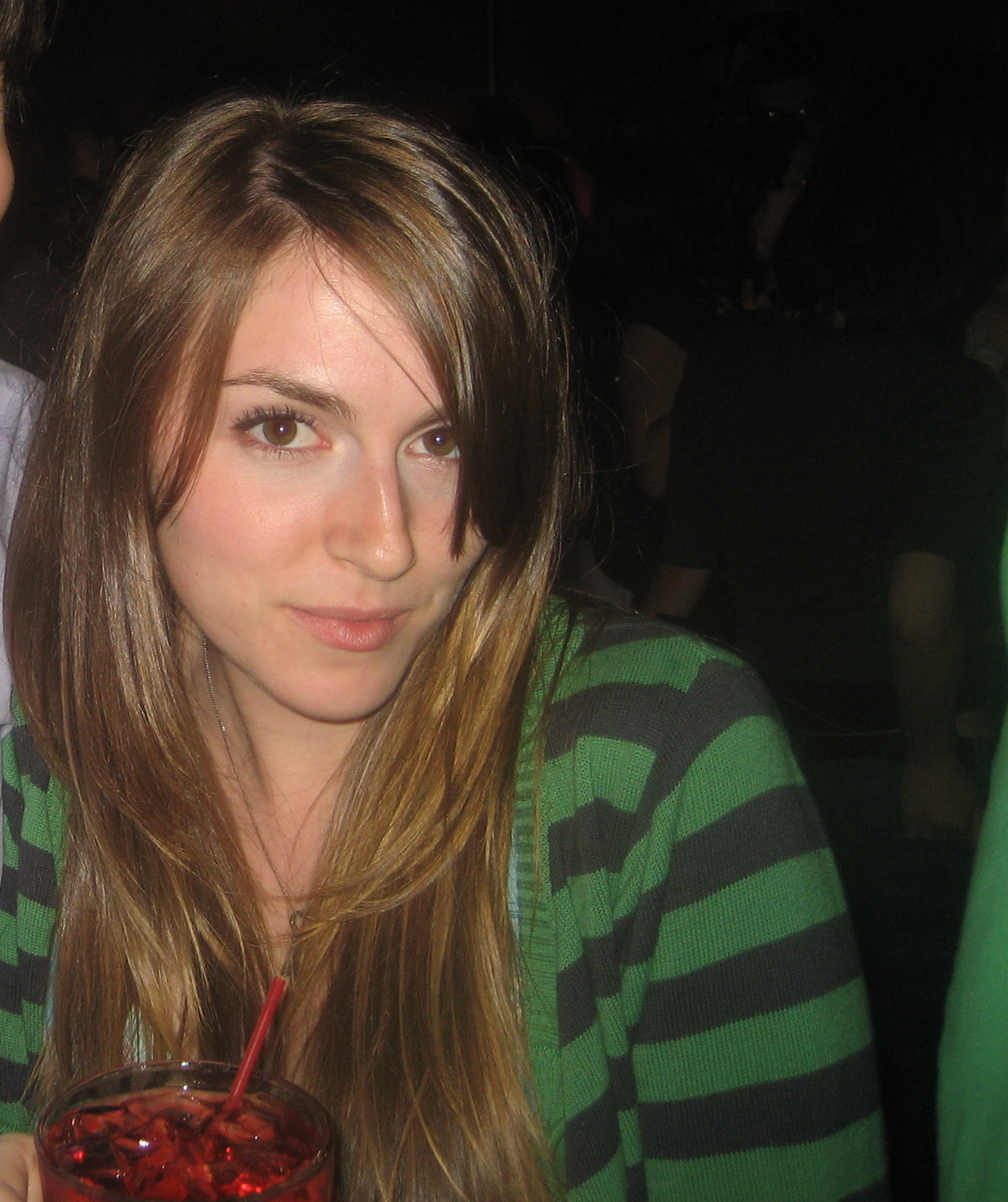
- Tendler in 2008
- Born: Annamarie Tendler; June 9, 1985 (age 41); Bethel, Connecticut, U.S.
- Education: The New School (BA); New York University (MA)
- Occupations: Make-up artist; writer; designer
- Years active: 2007–present
- Spouse: John Mulaney (m. 2014; div. 2022)
- Website: annamarietendler.com

Annamarie Tendler (born June 9, 1985), known professionally as Anna Marie Tendler, is an American multimedia artist known for her work in photography, makeup and hairstyling, and textile crafts, with a notable specialty in handmade lampshades. She is the author of Pin It!: 20 Fabulous Bobby Pin Hairstyles and The Daily Face: 25 Makeup Looks for Day, Night, and Everything In Between!. Her memoir, Men Have Called Her Crazy, was published by Simon & Schuster in August 2024.

== Early life and education ==
Tendler was born in Bethel, Connecticut. She is Jewish. According to an interview with Architectural Digest, Tendler studied hairstyling at Vidal Sassoon and the Make-up Designory after graduating from high school, and then studied photography at Parsons School of Design at The New School before dropping out. She later received her bachelor's degree from The New School in writing and psychology. In 2021, she received an MA degree from NYU Steinhardt in costume studies. Her thesis was titled The Lip Filler Phenomenon: Modern Medicine, Kylie Jenner, and Postfeminist Female Sexuality.

== Career ==
After dropping out of college her freshman year, Tendler began work as a hairstylist and makeup artist in New York City. She was an early pioneer in the world of online beauty gurus. In December 2007, she created a Tumblr blog dedicated to daily makeup looks that accumulated more than 350,000 followers. Her tutorials have been featured in magazines such as Glamour, HelloGiggles, and DailyCandy. In 2016, she partnered with Amy Poehler's Smart Girls to create a YouTube tutorial series combining beauty with the paranormal called The Other Side.

Since 2016, Tendler has owned a business called Silk Parlor, which handcrafts Victorian style lampshades. As a makeup artist and hair stylist, she has worked on various television series and comedy specials, including: The Old Man and the Seymour, CollegeHumor Originals, John Mulaney: New in Town, Aziz Ansari: Dangerously Delicious and John Mulaney: The Comeback Kid. On Broadway, she worked on the shows Oh, Hello and Natasha, Pierre, and the Great Comet of 1812.

In 2018, Tendler had a brief appearance in an episode of Comedians in Cars Getting Coffee featuring her then-husband John Mulaney. In 2019, Tendler was featured in Mulaney's musical comedy special John Mulaney & the Sack Lunch Bunch, where she discussed her greatest fears and played a cameo role in a sketch.

In September 2021, Tendler exhibited artwork at The Other Art Fair in Santa Monica, California. The exhibition, titled "rooms in the first house", is said by her website to "chronicle the often non-linear experiences of loss, anger, and powerlessness, as well as a reclamation of identity".

In 2022, Tendler began writing her memoir, Men Have Called Her Crazy, inspired by her stay at a psychiatric hospital in early 2021, and the events preceding and following that moment. The book was published by Simon & Schuster on August 13, 2024.

== Personal life ==
Tendler married comedian John Mulaney on July 5, 2014, at the Onteora Mountain House in Boiceville, New York. Their friend, comedian Dan Levy, officiated the ceremony. Mulaney often mentioned Tendler and their French Bulldog Petunia in his stand-up routines. Tendler and Mulaney's separation was announced in May 2021. In July of the same year, Mulaney filed for divorce, which was finalized in January 2022.

In 2022, Tendler shared her decision to undergo oocyte cryopreservation in an interview with Harper’s Bazaar.

Tendler resides in Connecticut.

On October 11, 2017, in a series of tweets, Tendler stated that in 2014, Ben Affleck groped her at a Golden Globes party.

== Bibliography ==
- The Daily Face: 25 Makeup Looks for Day, Night, and Everything In Between!. Chronicle Books. 2014. ISBN 978-1452128108.
- Pin It!: 20 Fabulous Bobby Pin Hairstyles. Chronicle Books. 2017. ISBN 978-1452158389.
- Men Have Called Her Crazy. Simon & Schuster. 2024. ISBN 978-1668032343.
