= John Mulaney: Kid Gorgeous at Radio City =

Stand-up comedy special by John Mulaney

- Directed by: Alex Timbers
- Written by: John Mulaney
- Produced by: John Skidmore
- Starring: John Mulaney; Carole Shelley
- Cinematography: Cameron Barnett
- Edited by: Kelly Lyon
- Music by: Jon Brion
- Distributed by: Netflix
- Release date: May 1, 2018
- Running time: 64 minutes
- Country: United States
- Language: English

John Mulaney: Kid Gorgeous at Radio City is a 2018 stand-up comedy special written by and starring John Mulaney. The special was recorded live in February 2018 at the Radio City Music Hall in New York City, and released by Netflix on May 1, 2018.

Similarly to Mulaney's previous show, The Comeback Kid, Kid Gorgeous is a visually simplistic stand-up routine with a major emphasis upon observational humor. The majority of jokes are centered upon Mulaney's adolescence, celebrity, marriage, politics and anxieties associated with contemporary American life.

Kid Gorgeous received an overwhelmingly positive critical response, with critics praising Mulaney for his compassionate delivery, observational wit and, in particular, a prolonged analogy comparing U.S. President Donald Trump to a "horse loose in a hospital". The special won the Primetime Emmy Award for Outstanding Writing for a Variety Special in 2018.

== Background ==
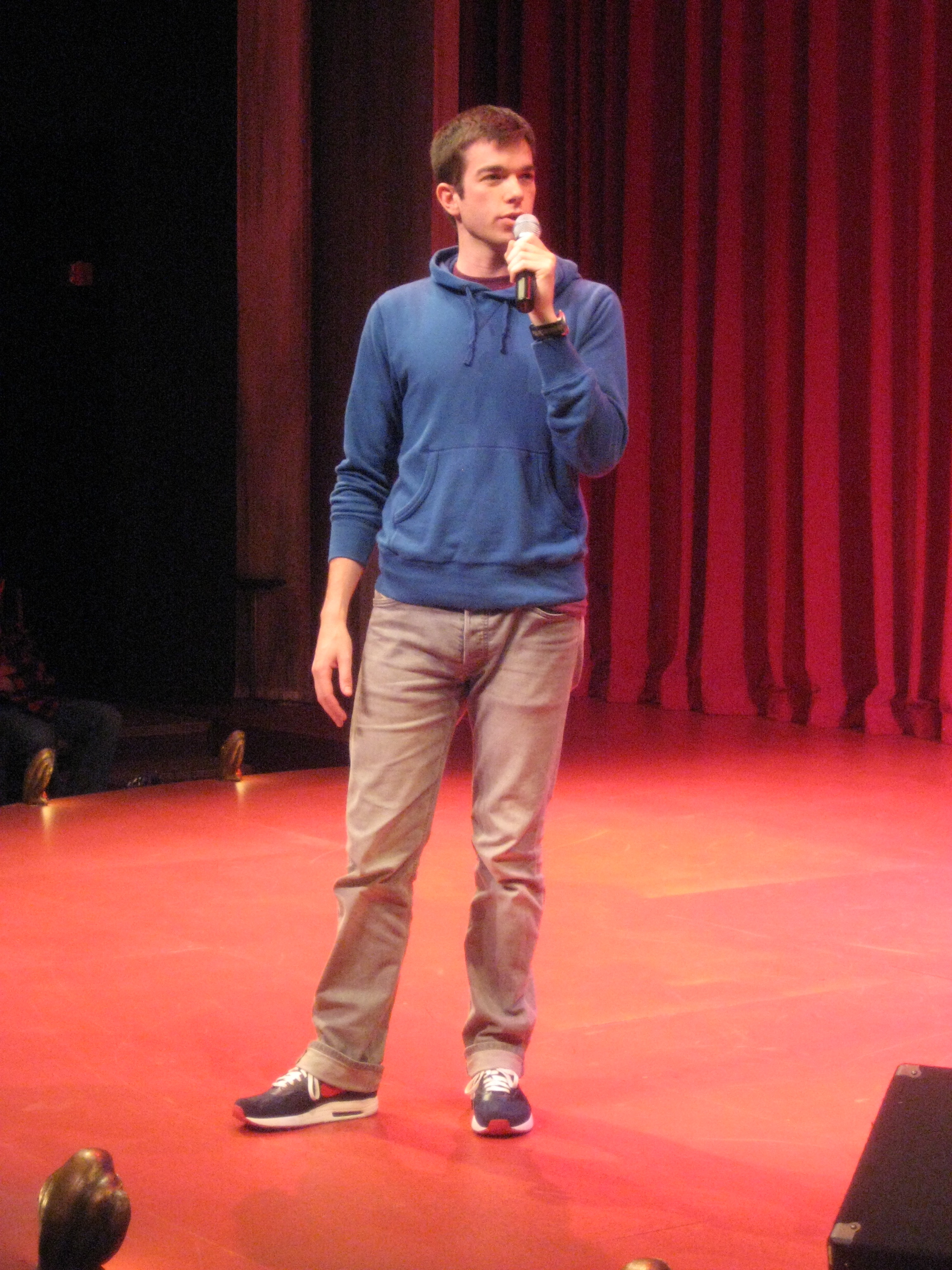
John Mulaney performing a stand-up routine during his six-year tenure at Saturday Night Live

John Mulaney rose to prominence in 2008, when he performed at the Bonnaroo Music Festival and earned a position on the writing team of Saturday Night Live. Prior to his distribution deal with Netflix, Mulaney released two stand-up comedy albums through Comedy Central Records: The Top Part in 2009 and New In Town in 2012.

The comedian's most recent stand-up show at the time of Kid Gorgeous's release was The Comeback Kid, which was performed throughout 2015 and released on Netflix in November of the same year. The Comeback Kid received similar acclaim from publications such as Paste Magazine and The Atlantic, and precipitated Netflix's decision to commission Mulaney's animated series Big Mouth in 2017.

Mulaney began writing and touring Kid Gorgeous, his fourth stand-up tour, in February, 2017. The Kid Gorgeous tour concluded in April 2018 in Jacksonville, Florida, following a sold-out, seven show run at Radio City in New York the preceding February; it was one such show that was filmed for the purposes of his Netflix special. Following 2016's The Comeback Kid and 2017's Oh, Hello On Broadway, Kid Gorgeous was the third comedy special Mulaney had manufactured specifically for Netflix.

The special's title "has no meaning" and derives from an episode of The Simpsons, wherein Moe Szyslak's boxing name was revealed to be "Kid Gorgeous". Mulaney was considering old-fashioned nomenclature reminiscent of 1940s gangsters, such as the "Bachelor Bandit", but eventually decided upon "Kid Gorgeous" as it made his wife "laugh the hardest". "Kid Charlemagne", a song by the American rock band Steely Dan, also provided inspiration for the title of Kid Gorgeous.

Following the release of Kid Gorgeous, Mulaney revealed that he had refined and performed the routine while recovering from a labral tear in his knee. Mulaney thought referring to himself as a "kid" whilst recovering from such an injury at age 35 highly amusing, which also influenced his choice of title.

== Synopsis ==
In the introduction, a nervous Mulaney prepares for his performance before he is ushered onstage by a mysterious chaperone (Carole Shelley). The show begins when, accompanied by organist Jon Brion, Mulaney greets the audience directly and launches into an introspective monologue about his parents' marriage, and his mother's alleged encounters with the supernatural.

Following this, Mulaney describes memorable events that have occurred throughout his relationship with his father, who would "pick [him] apart psychologically" rather than enacting physical discipline. Among these are an awkward sex talk regarding composer Leonard Bernstein's perceived homosexuality, and a humorous incident wherein six-year-old Mulaney was compared to a Nazi for failing to intervene during an act of schoolyard bullying.

The focus of the performance shifts to Mulaney's childhood, as he recalls the rituals associated with elementary school assemblies and the unusual antics of J. J. Bittenbinder, a retired Chicago police detective tasked with informing pupils of "stranger danger". Bittenbinder has since expressed his dismay with Mulaney's parody, disputing the notion that he ever "wore a three-piece suit with a cowboy hat". Mulaney then examines his tertiary education in similar detail, despairing over student loans and the "audacity" displayed by his former college, Georgetown University, in approaching alumni for donations.

Domestic life and the process of donating to Goodwill are skewered in the midst of the performance, before Mulaney details a lawsuit in which his college friends were sued for purported property damage. His failure to address the situation effectively transitions into a self-deprecating segment about the physical and psychological trauma associated with ageing. The relationship between ageing and alleged "grumpiness" segues into a comparison between the most memorable guests that appeared during his tenure on Saturday Night Live, including Patrick Stewart and Mick Jagger.

Mulaney's perception of the "olden times" prefaces his frustrations with the online CAPTCHA test routinely mistaking him for a robot. His fascination with "old-timey things" is illustrated by a description of a Connecticut gazebo built during the American Civil War, an act he compares to "performing stand-up comedy now" in the uncertain political climate of the 2010s. This analogy introduces an extended metaphor comparing "this guy we call President" (Donald Trump) to a "horse loose in a hospital", and reveals Mulaney's rationalization for his previous disinterest in politics. The joke was first performed in public during Mulaney's 2017 appearance on The Late Show with Stephen Colbert.

Mulaney's disdain for "these new Nazis" associated with the presidential establishment culminates in a loving evaluation of his three-and-a-half-year marriage to Annamarie Tendler, a make-up artist and lampshade designer of Jewish heritage. The contrast between their religious upbringings is emphasized by an anecdote concerning their French Bulldog Petunia, as an attempt to recreate Leonardo Da Vinci's The Last Supper revealed her mistaken belief that Jesus and his disciples were depicted celebrating Thanksgiving.

Stories from Mulaney's religious upbringing form the closing segment to the show, as he recalls Biblical stories, homilies and psalms that informed his religious education as a child.

== Production ==
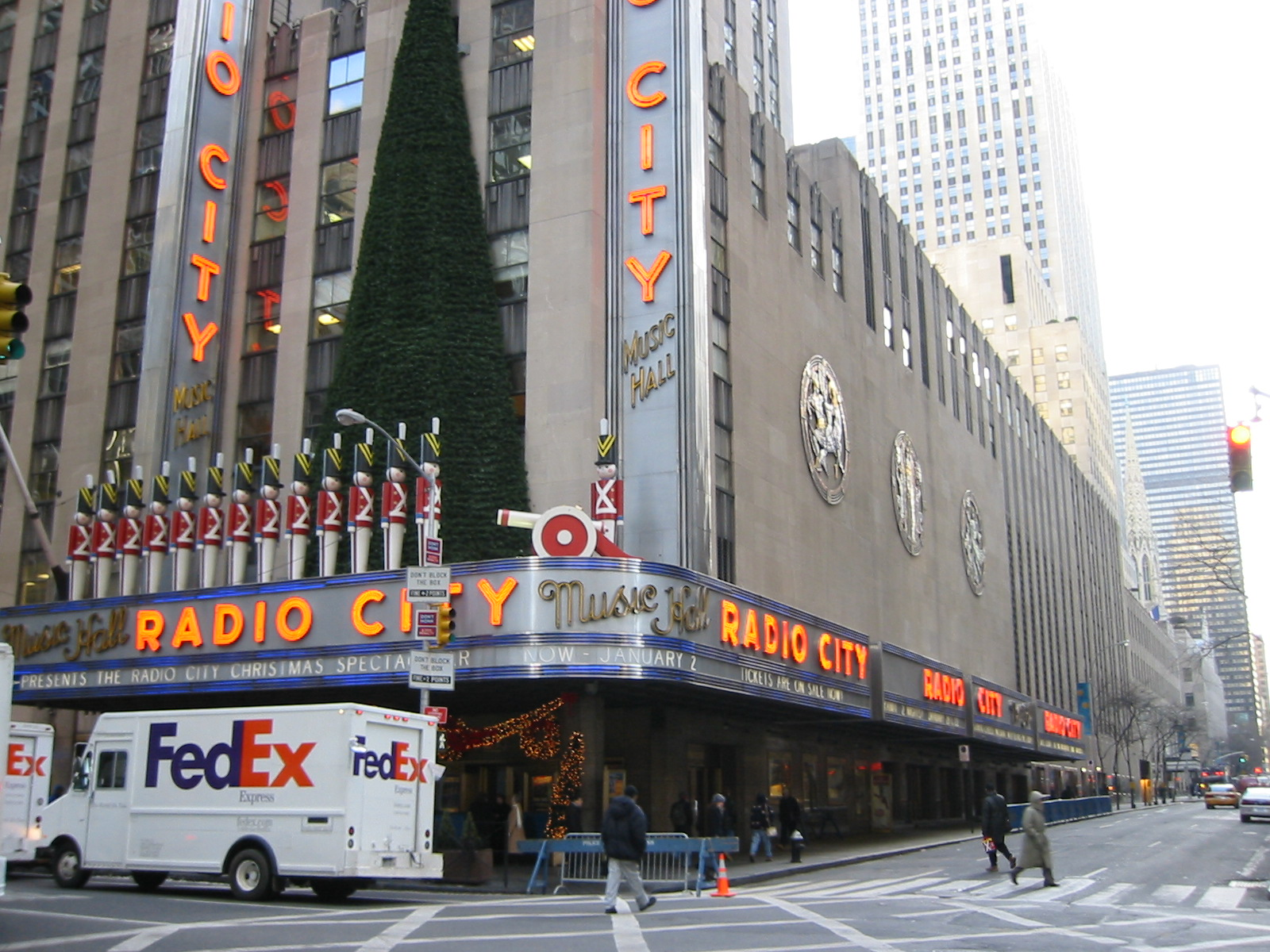
The special was filmed by Cameron Barnett at Radio City Music Hall in February, 2018.

Kid Gorgeous re-teamed Mulaney with director Alex Timbers, who was also responsible for directing Oh, Hello On Broadway on behalf of Mulaney and his frequent writing partner, Nick Kroll, in 2017. Releasing the special in May determined that Mulaney was eligible for the Primetime Emmy Award for Writing for a Variety Special, which he eventually won in September 2018.

Due to the special's location and status as a culmination of the longest tour Mulaney had ever performed, the comedian and his associates were "really conscious of capturing the stand-up as it was, really playing the building". This attitude greatly influenced the Set Design of the show, the stage of which industry veteran Scott Pask "deck[ed] out... to look like Fritz Lang by way of the Christmas Spectacular".

The grandiose setting was enhanced by three hydraulic levels capable of raising and lowering on the stage's surface, upon which Mulaney ascends during the performance's cold open. In the show's aftermath, Mulaney was "still disappointed that he couldn't write a joke that required using the in-house rain jets". Additionally, the Wurlitzer organ played by score composer and accompanist Jon Brion was built into the arches of the theater.

The special was produced by 3 Arts Entertainment alongside Jax Media, while visual effects were provided by Mechanism Digital. Running Man was responsible for 'digital intermediate' services; Parabolic NY provided Mulaney and Timbers with post-production sound services.

Mulaney revealed that he chose the name "Kid Gorgeous" by reading names off a list to his wife until she laughed. He also added that he likes it because it sounds "old fashioned", and that it's based on Simpsons character Moe Szyslak. He initially wanted to name the show "Kid Charlemagne" after the Steely Dan song, but later said "Everyone in my life warned me against that".

== Release ==
Kid Gorgeous was released by Netflix in the United States and international territories on May 1, 2018. The release date was announced on March 28, 2018, following the release of Mulaney's successful animated series, Big Mouth, on the platform in September, 2017.

In conjunction with Netflix's policies, the viewing figures for the special have not been released to the public.

== Analysis ==
Thematically, the show explores familial relationships, the trials and tribulations of contemporary American life, and the rituals commonly associated with Catholic mass. The routine is a tonal continuation of Mulaney's preceding performances, New In Town and The Comeback Kid, which featured anecdotes about his childhood interspersed with his perspective upon marriage, religion and politics.

The idea that humor "lies in the strangeness of everyday life" underpins the content of Kid Gorgeous, as Mulaney brings "a unique sense of empathy and specificity... to his stories and performances about the weirdoes living among us". Absurd yet arguably believable characterization is essential to the special, as Mulaney's observational humor and "honest-to-God kindness" are visible throughout his depictions of his extended family and retired police detective JJ Bittenbinder. This preoccupation with the eccentric is also illustrated by Mulaney's recollections of his tenure on Saturday Night Live, as he describes bizarre encounters with British celebrities Mick Jagger and Patrick Stewart.

The Atlantic's David Sims noted the increased maturity of the special's content. Sims attributes this to Mulaney's relationship with his "bizarrely boring" father, Charles Mulaney, which has precipitated a gradual realization that he is "half a world closer to the life of his good Catholic dad" following his recovery from alcoholism.

== Reception ==
=== Critical reception ===
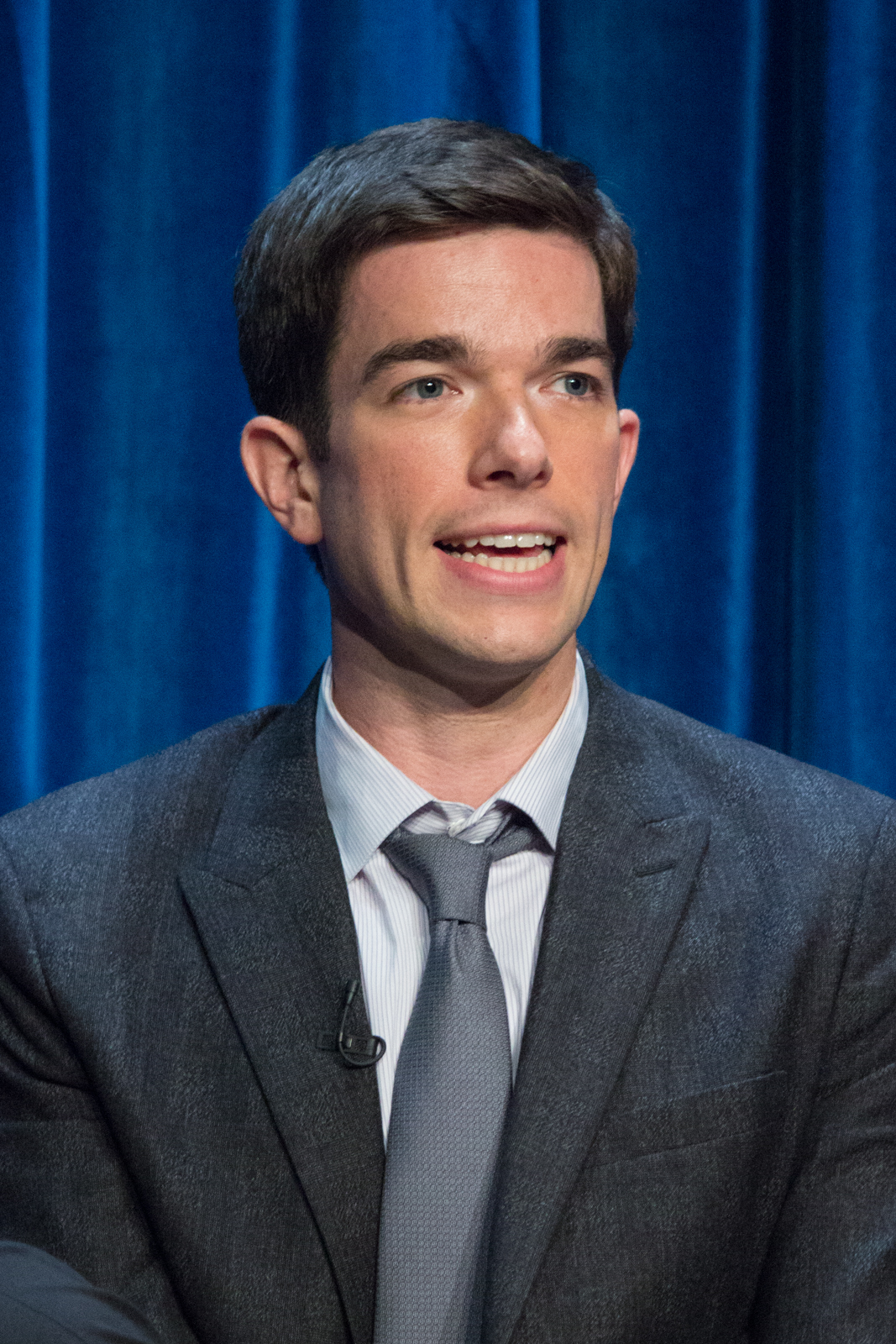
The special was released to overwhelmingly positive reviews from critics.

Kid Gorgeous received universal acclaim. Review aggregator website Rotten Tomatoes reports an approval rating of 100% based on 20 reviews, with an average rating of 8.5/10. The website's critical consensus reads, "John Mulaney incisively describes his own befuddlement with the modern world in this uproariously funny deconstruction of manners, relationships, and religion."

David Sims of The Atlantic was overwhelmingly positive in his review of Kid Gorgeous, noting that "Mulaney is one of the biggest powerhouses in comedy today" and that "Kid Gorgeous is another tremendous notch in his belt". Additionally, Sims draws attention to the increasing maturity of Mulaney's work, which he attributes to the comedian's "growing awareness that, as he's maturing, he's becoming a skewed version of the man he enjoys discussing most of all: his supreme square of a father".

The AV Club's Dennis Perkins assigned the show an A− rating, proclaiming that Mulaney's writing is "as sharp as ever" and that the special itself is "stand-up as clockwork... and those gears are calibrated in some pretty impressive ways". Paste's Garrett Martin also refers to Kid Gorgeous as the "continuation of a winning streak", deeming Mulaney's "mastery of language" his "defining trait as a comic", and calling his delivery "as crisp as his tailored suits and tightly cropped hair". This perspective is shared by Dana Schwartz of Entertainment Weekly, who believes that "if you don't know who John Mulaney is yet, it's time to catch the heck up".

Matt Zoller Seitz of Vulture, in a similarly positive review, suggests that Kid Gorgeous "might later be seen as a milestone in [John Mulaney's] artistic development". He praises Mulaney's self-deprecating, prematurely-aged stage persona, theorizing that "Mulaney with white hair, liver spots, and some sort of mild periodontal disease will be pure comedy gold". Ian Crouch of The New Yorker favorably compares Mulaney's stage persona with that of Jerry Seinfeld, stating that "Mulaney's jokes are similarly specific and urgent, as if he is... reliving the trials of his youth with a grander vocabulary and more attentive audience to hear his complaints".

=== Cultural impact ===
The popularity of the special has spawned an array of memes across the social media platforms Tumblr and Twitter. Reaction gifs of Mulaney's performance are routinely employed upon both websites, and a viral phenomenon referred to as "things as John Mulaney quotes" has emerged across Twitter. The movement was initiated by user Anja Reese, who created a thread entitled "John Mulaney quotes as musicals" in June 2018. Variations of the meme regarding pop punk/emo bands, pro wrestling and classical music, among others, and have become so popular across the internet that even Mulaney himself has acknowledged his newfound meme status.

The popularity of the special also sparked renewed interest in his previous special, The Comeback Kid. The special's resurgence precipitated the inception of the 'children yelling: "MCDONALD'S! MCDONALD'S! MCDONALD'S!"' meme in the latter half of 2018.

== See also ==
- The Oh, Hello Show
