= John Mulaney & the Sack Lunch Bunch =

2019 television special by Rhys Thomas

- Directed by: Rhys Thomas
- Written by: John Mulaney; Marika Sawyer
- Produced by: John Skidmore
- Starring: John Mulaney; Alexander Bello; Tyler Bourke; Ava Briglia; Cordelia Commando; Camille De La Cruz; Oriah Elgrabli; Jake Ryan Flynn; Orson Hong; Isabella Iannelli; Jacob Michael Laval; Suri Marrero; Zell Steele Morrow; Jonah Mussolino; Lexi Perkel; Linder Sutton
- Edited by: Adam Epstein
- Music by: Eli Bolin
- Production companies: A24; 3 Arts Entertainment; Petunia Pictures
- Distributed by: Netflix
- Release date: December 24, 2019
- Running time: 70 minutes
- Country: United States
- Language: English

John Mulaney & the Sack Lunch Bunch is a children's musical comedy special created by John Mulaney that debuted on Netflix on December 24, 2019. The show, directed by Rhys Thomas, was written by Mulaney and Marika Sawyer and inspired by classic children's television series, such as Sesame Street, The Electric Company and The Great Space Coaster.

Performing with Mulaney are 15 child actors and singers, ages 8 to 13. The special also includes celebrity cameos from Richard Kind, André De Shields, David Byrne, Natasha Lyonne, Annaleigh Ashford, and Jake Gyllenhaal. Eli Bolin composed the special's music, with lyrics from Mulaney and Sawyer.

== Summary ==
The hour-long variety special presents itself as one episode of a larger series. The special consists of several songs, skits, and activities interspersed with scripted segments of Mulaney chatting with the Bunch as well as unscripted interviews with both the children and the adult guest stars about their greatest fears and acting background.

- As an ensemble, Mulaney joins the cast to perform the opening sequence to the show ("It's John Mulaney & the Sack Lunch Bunch!"). It is reminiscent of classic childhood television opening themes.
- Jake, appearing as a younger version of Mulaney, sings a song ("Grandma's Got a Boyfriend") about his grandmother's boyfriend, Paul, and his many quirks, while wondering why the rest of his family hasn't accepted Paul.
- Jonah summarizes a fictional book he has read called Sascha's Dad Does Drag and the Act Needs Work, a book that features a comically frank depiction of drag culture from the perspective of the son of an aging drag queen.
- Mulaney plays the producer of a fictional Sony Pictures Animation film called Bamboo 2: Bamboozled which is being focus-grouped by the entire Bunch. The skit pokes fun at the kids' viewing habits and the tropes of modern western animation.
- A father, played by Mulaney, hires a math tutor (André De Shields) to help his son, Jonah, with algebra. The Tutor performs an elaborate Dixieland-style jazz number ("Algebra Song") about how not knowing math caused him to lose his eye — however, it turns out to be a shaggy dog story, with his eye being unexpectedly saved at the last minute. It is later revealed that the Tutor lost his eye by accident while performing the song.
- A transitional scene focused on Googy, presented as a recurring Sack Lunch Bunch character, is interrupted when Mulaney is forced to reveal to the kids that the actor who played Googy died, subsequently having a frank conversation about death.
- During lunchtime, Orson breaks into song about how he will only ever eat one food: "a plain plate of noodles with a little bit of butter."
- Mulaney and Tyler play a chess game and continually try to throw one another off with existential questions and absurd facts.
- Suri urges Mulaney to play "restaurant" with her, only for the game to end abruptly when Suri refuses to allow him entry into her imaginary restaurant.
- Actor Richard Kind has an unscripted discussion with Ava, Cordelia, and Camille about movies, his career, and their experiences in plays. Nearly every sentence contains the phrase "girl talk."
- Lexi and her friend David Byrne prepare to put on a skit in front of the guests at her parents' dinner party. However, when all of the guests talk over the performance, she and Byrne launch into a musical number urging the guests to pay attention and explaining what they planned to do in the skit, including cartwheels, acting out the entirety of Frozen, and a fake newscast while wearing an enormous blazer.
- Zell and Oriah perform a dramatic '80s-inspired power ballad wondering what happens to flowers at night.
- Jacob and David Byrne make a papier-mâché volcano despite Byrne's childhood fear of volcanoes.
- While Mulaney asks about the Bunch's top New York moments, Alex recalls a time he was in New York and saw a woman (Annaleigh Ashford) crying on the street. He wonders in song about what would happen if he had gone up to her and asked what was wrong, and imagines the friendship they may have shared if he had done so.
- Special guest Mr. Music (Jake Gyllenhaal) attempts to demonstrate how one can make music without instruments. However Mr. Music, having failed to prepare for his segment, grows increasingly exasperated as the objects around the studio he tries to use as examples fail to make any sound.
- The special ends with a final round of interviews with all of the child and adult performers.

== Cast ==
Adult cast

- John Mulaney as himself
- André De Shields as The Tutor
- Richard Kind as himself
- David Byrne as himself
- Natasha Lyonne as herself
- Jake Gyllenhaal as Mr. Music/himself
- Annaleigh Ashford as Sobbing White Lady
- Shereen Pimentel as herself
- Annamarie Tendler as herself
- Erin Quill as Lexi's Mom

The Sack Lunch Bunch

- Alexander Bello
- Tyler Bourke
- Ava Briglia
- Cordelia Comando
- Camille De La Cruz
- Oriah Elgrabli
- Jake Ryan Flynn
- Orson Hong
- Isabella Iannelli
- Jacob Laval
- Suri Marrero
- Zell Steele Morrow
- Jonah Mussolino
- Lexi Perkel
- Linder Sutton

== Production ==
Before working on the special, both Mulaney and his co-writer Marika Sawyer had allegedly sought to do some kind of comedy bit involving children. One idea was a segment on Weekend Update called "Lil Weekend Update" which would have been anchored entirely by children. Another concept was a Mulaney-written stand up special performed by a ten year old. Neither project came to fruition. Mulaney noted that during development, it was difficult for him to articulate to people exactly what he wanted, saying "It was a lot of telling people what it wasn't".

Mulaney noted that often adults talk down to kids, telling Entertainment Weekly: "When I see people interact with kids, I was always like, 'Why are you talking down to them? Why are you crouching on the floor talking in a high voice?' I don't recall needing that as a kid." He theorizes that "kids think that they're older than they've ever been. They believe they're adults"; and as such he wanted a special that children and adults could watch together and laugh at the same jokes instead of the normal "this joke's for adults and this joke's for kids" approach often seen in children's entertainment.

While appearing on Patriot Act with Hasan Minhaj, Mulaney described the special as being inspired by other educational children's programs such as Sesame Street, Mister Rogers' Neighborhood, The Electric Company, and even more specifically, shows like Free to Be... You and Me, and 3-2-1 Contact.

The special is co-written by Marika Sawyer (Saturday Night Live) and music composer Eli Bolin (Sesame Street, Original Cast Album: Co-Op), who drew inspiration from musical influences including Burt Bacharach, Howard Ashman and Alan Menken, and Trinidadian calypso legend Mighty Sparrow. They turned to pieces like Maurice Sendak and Carole King's "Really Rosie", which Mulaney remembered from childhood, and Harry Nilsson's "The Point," which were also fueled by catchy songs and extremely relatable anxieties. "As a kid, we watched movies like Little Shop of Horrors and Clue, and they didn't seem inappropriate – and I don't think they are," Mulaney says. "But they had a lot of tension to them."

== Music ==
=== Track listing ===
The soundtrack was released through Drag City digitally, on vinyl, and on CD.

All tracks are written by John Mulaney, Eli Bolin, and Marika Sawyer.

John Mulaney & The Sack Lunch Bunch track listing
No.	Title	Singer	Length
1.	"It's John Mulaney and the Sack Lunch Bunch!"	The Sack Lunch Bunch	:49
2.	"Grandma's Boyfriend Paul"	Jake Ryan Flynn	3:37
3.	"Algebra Song!"	André De Shields; Alexander Bello; Camille De La Cruz; Isabella Iannelli; Zell Steele Morrow	4:46
4.	"Googy's Theme"	Chorus	:15
5.	"Plain Plate of Noodles"	Orson Hong; The Sack Lunch Bunch	2:49
6.	"Do You Wanna Play Restaurant"	Suri Marrero; Mulaney	:55
7.	"Pay Attention!"	Lexi Perkel; David Byrne	3:51
8.	"Do Flowers Exist at Night?"	Morrow; Oriah Elgrabli; Shereen Pimentel	1:51
9.	"I Saw a White Lady Standing on the Street Just Sobbing (and I Think About It Once a Week)"	Bello; Annaleigh Ashford	4:32
10.	"Music, Music Everywhere!"	Jake Gyllenhaal; The Sack Lunch Bunch	5:17
Total length:			28:46

== Release ==
On November 22, 2019, Mulaney tweeted a poster of The Sack Lunch Bunch in a parody of the artwork from the original Broadway cast recording of A Chorus Line.

On December 12, 2019, Netflix released a promotional teaser, also directed by Thomas, that doubled as homage to Bob Fosse's classic film All That Jazz, consisting of nearly shot-for-shot recreations of the 1979 musical's opening, with Mulaney dressed all in black (just as Roy Scheider portrayed the character Joe Gideon). On December 16, 2019, there was a premiere event hosted for The Sack Lunch Bunch where the film was screened for the first time.

On April 2, 2020, a Twitter Live event was hosted at 7PM in which anybody could watch The Sack Lunch Bunch and live tweet about it using the hashtag, #SackLunchWatch. Viewers could tweet their questions using the hashtag and members of the cast and creatives of the film would respond.

== Reception ==
=== Critical reception ===
The special received a 96% "fresh" score on Rotten Tomatoes and has an 87 on Metacritic. Critic Alan Sepinwall of Rolling Stone Magazine, wrote "It is, like Galaxy Quest, The Princess Bride, or Jane the Virgin, one of those gems that manages to simultaneously parody a genre and be an excellent recreation of it." Critic Erik Adams, from The A.V. Club gave the special an A rating, writing, "The Sack Lunch Bunch is an unconventional package, but its ingredients are pure John Mulaney". Richard Roeper of The Chicago Sun-Times, and John Anderson of The Wall Street Journal both praised the special, describing it more as "effective conceptual art than a variety show".

=== Accolades ===
Year	Award	Category	Recipient(s) and nominee(s)	Result	Ref(s)
2020	Primetime Emmy Awards	Outstanding Variety Special (Pre-Recorded)	John Mulaney, Marika Sawyer, Rhys Thomas, David Miner, Cara Masline, Ravi Nandan, Inman Young, Dave Ferguson, Corey Deckler, Mary Beth Minthorn and Kerri Hundley	Nominated	
2020	Primetime Emmy Awards	Outstanding Writing for a Variety Special	John Mulaney and Marika Sawyer	Nominated	

== Future ==
Mulaney has suggested in an interview with Vulture that he hopes to do another Sack Lunch Bunch special, and that he has material that did not make it into the first one that he hopes to explore in later specials. In July 2020, it was announced that Mulaney had signed a deal with Comedy Central for two more Sack Lunch Bunch specials. As of 2026, they had not been produced.
