= John Mulaney Presents: Everybody's in LA =

Season of television series

- Created by: John Mulaney
- Written by: Anna Drezen; David Ferguson; Fran Gillespie; Langston Kerman; John Mulaney; Alex Scordelis; Rajat Suresh; Jeremy Levick
- Directed by: Joe DeMaio
- Presented by: John Mulaney
- Starring: Richard Kind
- Opening theme: "To Live and Die in L.A." by Wang Chung
- No. of seasons: 1
- No. of episodes: 6

Production
- Executive producers: John Mulaney; Ashley Edens
- Producers: Connor Malbeuf; Molly Lambert; James Kim; Rosie Kaller

Original release
- Network: Netflix
- Release: May 3 – May 10, 2024

John Mulaney Presents: Everybody's in LA is an American talk show, originally aired live in the United States on Netflix. The series originally aired as a limited series lasting six episodes between May 3 to May 10, 2024, as part of the Netflix Is a Joke Festival. The show is hosted by comedian John Mulaney who also serves as the creator and executive producer. Richard Kind serves as the show's announcer and sidekick. The series features monologues, guests, pre-taped sketches, and musical segments with field pieces shot around Los Angeles.

== Conception ==
Hosted by comedian John Mulaney, each episode had a theme, a monologue, pre-taped sketches, guest stars, and musical performers and aired live on Netflix at 10pm EDT. There were six episodes Sunday through Friday from May 5 to 10, 2024, as part of the Netflix is a Joke Festival. The first guest of the talk show, comedian Jerry Seinfeld, stated, "This is the weirdest show I have ever been on in my life" and later added "You've brought your amazing rehab zaniness to this show". In a June 2024 interview with Vanity Fair, Mulaney revealed he reached out to David Lynch, Werner Herzog, David Lee Roth, and Bo Burnham to appear on the show but they declined.

== Influences ==
Variety noted its influences, writing, "With its wood paneling, warm earth tones, and ample houseplants, the studio for Everybody's in LA is a ‘70s-inspired nod to the likes of Johnny Carson and Dick Cavett. Character actor Richard Kind, himself a visiting dignitary from New York, assumes the traditional role of the sidekick". Vulture noted that the format was heavily inspired by The Chris Gethard Show, which frequently featured Mulaney as a guest. Chris Gethard has been supportive of the Everybody's in LA, and has noted that on multiple occasions he's provided advice to Mulaney on live production.

== Participants ==
Numerous guests and musical performers appeared on the show including:

=== Guests ===
- Jerry Seinfeld (episode 1)
- Will Ferrell as Lou Adler (episode 1)
- Tony Tucci (episode 1)
- Ray J (episode 1)
- Stavros Halkias (episode 1)
- Jon Stewart (episode 2)
- Amanda Begley (episode 2)
- Gabriel Iglesias (episode 2)
- Andy Samberg as James Goldstein (episode 2)
- Mae Martin (episode 2)
- Nate Bargatze (episode 3)
- Earthquake (episode 3)
- Patton Oswalt (episode 3)
- Zoey Tur (episode 3)
- Marcia Clark (episode 3)
- Sarah Silverman (episode 4)
- Cassandra Peterson (episode 4)
- Tom Segura (episode 4)
- Kerry Gaynor (episode 4)
- Ronny Chieng (episode 4)
- David Letterman (episode 5)
- Bill Hader (episode 5)
- Cedric the Entertainer (episode 5)
- Luenell (episode 5)
- Dr. Lucy Jones (episode 5)
- Kevin Gage as Waingro (episode 5)
- Pete Davidson (episode 5)
- Hannah Gadsby (episode 6)
- Mike Birbiglia (episode 6)
- Dr. Emily Lindsey (episode 6)
- Flea (episode 6)
- George Wallace (episode 6)
- Nikki Glaser (episode 6)
- John Carpenter (episode 6)

=== Pre-taped cameos ===
- Earthquake (episode 1)
- Fortune Feimster (episode 1)
- Langston Kerman (episodes 1, 3)
- Natasha Leggero (episode 1)
- Daniel Levy (episode 1)
- Chelsea Peretti (episode 1)
- George Wallace (episode 1)
- Patton Oswalt (episode 3)
- Fred Armisen (episode 3)
- Lee Ving (episode 3)
- Mike Watt (episode 3)
- Kid Congo Powers (episode 3)
- Don Bolles (episode 3)
- Exene Cervenka (episode 3)
- Linda Ramone (episode 3)
- DJ Bonebrake (episode 3)
- Joe Baiza (episode 3)
- Penelope Houston (episode 3)
- Trudie Argulles-Barrett (episode 3)
- George Hurley (episode 3)
- Rajat Suresh (episodes 3, 5)
- Jeremy Levick (episodes 3, 5)
- John Mulaney as George St. Geegland (episode 4)
- Nick Kroll as Gil Faizon (episode 4)
- Cedric the Entertainer (episode 5)
- Brian Grazer (episode 5)

=== Musical performers ===
- St. Vincent (episode 1)
- Warren G (episode 2)
- Joyce Manor (episode 3)
- Weezer (episode 4)
- Los Lobos (episode 5)
- Beck (episode 6)

=== Guest callers ===
- Lisa Gilroy (episode 2)
- James Austin Johnson as Bob Dylan (episode 3)
- Jimmy Kimmel (episode 4)
- Ben Mankiewicz (episode 5)
- Mayor of Los Angeles Karen Bass (episode 6)

== Episodes ==
No.	Title	Directed by	Written by	Original release date
1	"Coyotes"	Joe DeMaio	John Mulaney, Anna Drezen, David Ferguson, Fran Gillespie, Langston Kerman, Alex Scordelis, and Rajat Suresh	May 3, 2024
Mulaney talked to comedian Jerry Seinfeld and wildlife advocate Tony Tucci. The musical guest was St. Vincent, who performed "Flea" from her 2024 album All Born Screaming. Will Ferrell, who portrayed record and film producer Lou Adler, and standup comedian Stavros Halkias made appearances on the show. Saymo the delivery cart robot is introduced. A fisherman in Echo Park and a man who pastes billboards for a living are interviewed. Mulaney talked to musician and entrepreneur Ray J. A pre-taped sketch featured Mulaney and comedians going house hunting, featuring Earthquake, Fortune Feimster, Langston Kerman, Natasha Leggero, Daniel Levy, Chelsea Peretti, and George Wallace.
2	"Palm Trees"	Joe DeMaio	John Mulaney, Anna Drezen, David Ferguson, Fran Gillespie, Langston Kerman, Alex Scordelis, and Rajat Suresh	May 6, 2024
Mulaney talked to guests comedian Jon Stewart, TreePeople activist Amanda Begley, and comedian Gabriel Iglesias. The musical guest was Warren G, who performed “Regulate” from the 1994 album Above the Rim. Andy Samberg, who portrayed James Goldstein, and comedian Mae Martin appeared on the show. Saymo the delivery cart robot is re-introduced. Richard Kind goes in search for Acid before seeing Mulaney perform at the Hollywood Bowl. Mental health professionals diagnose the mental health of standup comedians. The Leonardo DiCaprio themed reading room at the Los Feliz Branch Library is spotlighted. Langston Kerman appears in a sketch satirizing Terrence Howard’s comments on multiplication.
3	"Helicopters"	Joe DeMaio	John Mulaney, Anna Drezen, David Ferguson, Fran Gillespie, Langston Kerman, Alex Scordelis, Jeremy Levick, and Rajat Suresh	May 7, 2024
Mulaney talked to guests comedians Nate Bargatze, Earthquake, reporter Zoey Tur, and lawyer Marcia Clark. The musical guest was Joyce Manor, who performed "Constant Headache" from their 2011 self-entitled album and "Catalina Fight Song" from their 2014 album Never Hungover Again. It's sunglasses night, and the guests talked about where they were during the 1994 O.J. Simpson Bronco chase. Richard Kind attempts to sell the guests on his card game "Richard Kind's Party Starters". Patton Oswalt appeared on the show and in a pre-taped sketch. James Austin Johnson voiced Bob Dylan as a call in listener on the show. In a pre-taped sketch, Fred Armisen hosted a focus group for old punks, with Lee Ving, Mike Watt, Kid Congo Powers, Don Bolles, Exene Cervenka, Linda Ramone, DJ Bonebrake, Joe Baiza, Penelope Houston, Trudie Argulles-Barrett, and George Hurley.
4	"Paranormal"	Joe DeMaio	John Mulaney, Anna Drezen, David Ferguson, Fran Gillespie, Langston Kerman, Alex Scordelis, and Rajat Suresh	May 8, 2024
Mulaney talked to comedians Sarah Silverman, Tom Segura, Ronny Chieng, actress Cassandra Peterson, and hypnotherapist Kerry Gaynor. The musical guest was Weezer, who performed "The Good Life" from their 1996 album Pinkerton and "Buddy Holly" from their 1994 Blue Album. Mulaney and Nick Kroll reprised their roles George St. Geegland and Gil Faizon in two pre-taped sketches entitled, “Oh HelLos Angeles”. In the audience are fictional nepo babies are "Lil George Carlin", "Eve Harvey" with a sketch spoofing Last Week Tonight with John Oliver featuring "Lil John Oliver". Richard Kind gave summaries about the mystery books he's reading. Jimmy Kimmel called into the show as a paranormal skeptic. Mulaney ended the show giving a shout out to the late Steve Albini, who passed away the day before.
5	"Earthquakes"	Joe DeMaio	John Mulaney, Anna Drezen, David Ferguson, Fran Gillespie, Langston Kerman, Alex Scordelis, Jeremy Levick, and Rajat Suresh	May 9, 2024
Mulaney talked to comedians David Letterman, Bill Hader, Luenell, and seismologist Dr. Lucy Jones. The musical guest was Los Lobos, who performed "La Bamba". Mulaney announced that this episode would be the one he would submit for the Emmy Awards. Cedric the Entertainer appeared on the show and starred in a pre-taped sketch where he gave a hoarder and woman caring for her elderly mother a botched make-over. In pre-taped documentaries, a tennis player, a tap dancer, and a woman detailing her earthquake experience on America’s Funniest Home Videos are interviewed. Kevin Gage, reprising his role of Waingro from Heat, performed a standup set. Rajat Suresh, as the show’s political correspondent, and Jeremy Levick, as a "reverse Borat,” appeared in a pre-taped sketch. Pete Davidson made an unscheduled appearance on the couch. Ben Mankiewicz of TCM called in to tell his earthquake experience. Brian Grazer acted in a pre-taped sketch telling children about his experiences in Hollywood, including making American Gangster and his Academy Award for Best Picture loss for Apollo 13.
6	"The Future of LA"	Joe DeMaio	John Mulaney, Anna Drezen, David Ferguson, Fran Gillespie, Langston Kerman, Alex Scordelis, Jeremy Levick, and Rajat Suresh	May 10, 2024
Mulaney talked to comedians Hannah Gadsby and Mike Birbiglia, and Associate Curator at the La Brea Tar Pits Dr. Emily Lindsey. The musical guest was Beck, who performed "Loser" from his 1994 album Mellow Gold. Two audience members play "Finding Flea" where they go in search to find the musician Flea. The winner received $200. Mayor of Los Angeles Karen Bass called into the show to talk about the future of LA. Mulaney talked to director John Carpenter about his film career and his predictions for LA. Richard Kind and Saymo the robot get into a fight over Kind’s fictional girlfriend JoBeth. A pre-taped sketch featured graduation advice from “LA’s Worst Parkers.” George Wallace, and Nikki Glaser made unscheduled appearances on the couch. Glaser talked about her performance at The Roast of Tom Brady. Wallace brings out a cake for Mulaney to congratulate him on his final show. Saymo ultimately found Flea at a Denny's. Mulaney ended the show giving a shoutout to KTLA entertainment reporter Sam Rubin, who passed away earlier in the day.

== Reception ==
=== Critical reviews ===
The series received positive reviews with Matthew Creith of TheWrap declaring, "[Mulaney] reinvents the late night format" adding "He's that good and the eccentric show he's built is delightfully nonsensical." EJ Dickinson of Rolling Stone wrote, "There's no real reason for Everybody's in L.A., a six-episode live special, to exist but, like its host, it is unpredictable and charming". Alison Herman of Variety described the series as a "pop-up talk show", adding "with Everybody's in LA Mulaney is back on more comfortable ground: a throwback vehicle for exploring highly personal hobby horses, casting himself as a self-effacing but still smoothly composed master of ceremonies".

Michael Martin of The A.V. Club however gave the series a negative review writing, "Random chaos doesn't make for consistent comedy, and episode one of Everybody's In LA managed to come off both manic and sluggish" before adding, "The host would be well-advised to settle down, sharpen his comic focus, and take fewer prisoners, himself included".

=== Accolades ===
Year	Award	Category	Recipient(s)	Result	Ref.
2024	TCA Awards	Outstanding Achievement in Sketch/Variety Shows	John Mulaney Presents: Everybody's in LA	Won	
2024	Set Decorators Society of America Awards	Best Achievement in Decor/Design of a Variety, Reality or Competition Series	Kelley Pearce and Raquel Tarbet	Nominated	
2024	Gold Derby Awards	Variety Talk Series	John Mulaney Presents: Everybody's in LA	Nominated	
2024	Primetime Emmy Award	Outstanding Picture Editing for Variety Programming	Kelly Lyon, Sean McIlraith and Ryan McIlraith (for “Paranormal”)	Won	
2025	Critics Choice Awards	Best Talk Show	John Mulaney Presents: Everybody's in LA	Won	

== Spinoff ==
The series has continued with its spinoff Everybody's Live with John Mulaney which is currently airing on Netflix.
