= Netflix Is a Joke Festival =

Comedy festival held in Los Angeles, California

Netflix Is a Joke Fest
- Genre: Comedy festival
- Locations: Los Angeles, California, United States
- Years active: 2022–2026
- Founded: April 28, 2022; 4 years ago
- Website: https://www.netflixisajokefest.com/

Netflix Is a Joke Fest is a biennial comedy festival produced by Netflix that takes place in Los Angeles, California. Having taken place in 2022 and 2024, the festival hosts conventional standup shows, showcase shows, live podcast recordings, and table reads. In 2024, an outdoor event was added for weekends during the festival and featured a variety of performances including roast battles, drag shows, trivia shows, and musical performances in addition to conventional stand-up comedy with surprise lineups.

In 2024, several major festival events, including The Roast of Tom Brady, John Mulaney Presents: Everybody's in LA, and Katt Williams' latest special Woke Foke, were broadcast live for Netflix subscribers, making them accessible to viewers worldwide as they were performed in Los Angeles.

The 2026 festival took place between May 4–10 in Los Angeles featuring comedians including Kevin Hart, Mindy Kaling, David Spade, Dana Carvey, Nikki Glaser, Ralph Barbosa, Bill Burr, Ali Wong, Michelle Collins and Leanne Morgan.

== Controversy ==
At the 2022 festival, during a performance at the Hollywood Bowl, comedian Dave Chappelle was attacked by someone in attendance who had rushed the stage. The incident received extensive media coverage.
