= The Oh, Hello Show =

Comedy act by Nick Kroll and John Mulaney

The Oh, Hello Show is a comedy act created by American comedians Nick Kroll and John Mulaney that was popularized on Comedy Central's Kroll Show. A fictional New York One cable access show stars Gil Faizon (Kroll) and George St. Geegland (Mulaney), elderly men from the Upper West Side of Manhattan who are known for their turtlenecks, misinformed beliefs, and tendency to say "Oh, hello" in unison. The characters appeared on several shows and in a Broadway play called Oh, Hello that ran for 138 performances at the Lyceum Theatre from September 2016 to January 2017.

== Characters ==
Roommates George and Gil are in their 70s and have strong New York accents, and they frequently mispronounce common words and names. For example, they refer to Ashton Kutcher's show Punk'd as Ashram Kitchen's Prank'd; Johnny Knoxville as Johnny Nashville, and Candid Camera as Candy Camera. They also frequently put the stress on the wrong syllables of words, especially in iambic fashion. For example, pronouncing Broadway as "Br'dway" and junk mail as "j'nk mail", and their podcast named "Oh Hello: The P'dcast". The pair have shaggy gray hair and beards, wear glasses, and wear baggy clothes for an overall unkempt appearance, Geegland tending to dress more formally. They met in Toronto while dodging the Vietnam War, but they did their part for the war effort by fighting with Asians they saw in Canada. George is an author and playwright and has written several shows for him and Gil to star in, usually not being well received by their audiences. They have a dog named Pug Giamatti, but he left for an adventure in Saugerties.

=== Gil Faizon ===
Gil's birth name is Gil Cosby, but he took his wife's last name of Faizon. He is of Polish Jewish descent. Faizon has an ex-wife, son (Adam Brody), and stepson (Joe Mande). Gil's father reportedly "ratted out other Jews during the Holocaust." He is very proud of being Jewish, especially the Israeli settlements, and members of strict Orthodox sects who look at him disdainfully on the bus. He had a Bar Mitzvah and his Torah portion was an Archie comic. Faizon, who has more of a Brooklyn Jewish accent, often introduces himself as "Charmed I'm sure, Gil Faizon." He is an actor and voice-actor. He is also a stand-in model for mashed potatoes and other creamed foods. He suffers from bagel-induced cholesterol and eczema.

=== George St. Geegland ===
St. Geegland was born in Providence, Rhode Island to verbally abusive parents sometime in the mid-1940s. He was responsible for reintroducing the polio virus to his school district. His family is Presbyterian and Dutch from St. Geegland, Von Dutch. In college, he attended Columbia University as a penmanship major. St. Geegland, a former short story professor at the fictitious SUNY Yonkers, is the more aggressive of the two characters. He often yells at others, makes racist comments, and may have raped a student. His behavior and anti-psychotic medication indicates that he may be a psychopath. St. Geegland's unwritten novel, Rifkin's Dilemma, is about the boyhood of a man with a fondness for masturbation. He's been married three times. All three of St. Geegland's wives died the same way, on the same staircase. His first wife's name was Inertia Bernstein. He was divorced at the age of 46. Spalding Gray personally disliked him, and he has chapped hands. He may have Alzheimer's disease.

== Early development ==
In the early 2000s, Kroll and Mulaney developed the characters while hosting a weekly show at Rififi, a New York comedy club closed in 2008.

Kroll and Mulaney developed Faizon and St. Geegland after watching two men wearing turtlenecks and blazers at The Strand Bookstore each purchase a copy of Alan Alda's book Never Have Your Dog Stuffed: And Other Things I've Learned. It was during the time at Rififi that Kroll and Mulaney were able to hone their characters, without wigs but already featuring many of their character traits.

In 2008, the characters made their first filmed appearances in a short-lived series of comedy sketches on the comedy website Funny or Die titled The Oh, Hello Show. The shorts depicted Gil Faizon and George St. Geegland as abrasive, opinionated New Yorkers whose interactions were marked by social obliviousness, combative banter, and exaggerated cultural commentary. These early online sketches helped solidify the characters’ dynamic and comedic style prior to their later stage and television iterations.

== Television appearances ==
=== Human Giant ===
The duo made one of their earliest TV appearances during Human Giant's MTV Takeover, a 24-hour broadcast running from May 18 to May 19, 2007. During their appearance, wearing an early version of their trademark grey wigs, they mixed a "Turkey-tini" cocktail, which evolved into the "Tuna-tini". The characters were also featured in Kroll's 2011 standup special Nick Kroll: Thank You Very Cool.

=== Kroll Show ===
The characters of Faizon and St. Geegland were heavily popularized on Kroll's self-titled Comedy Central show, Kroll Show (2013–15), where they appeared in 11 episodes. They were presented through several different formats, including a variety of sketches, and the prank show Too Much Tuna, as hosts of a public access prank show in which unsuspecting contestants are given tuna fish sandwiches with "too much tuna". They usually ruined the prank by telling the contestant that a tuna fish sandwich was coming before the plate of food arrived. Too Much Tuna also carried over to their stage show.

=== Late Night with Seth Meyers ===
The duo has appeared in character as guests on two episodes of Late Night with Seth Meyers, promoting the Off-Broadway and Broadway runs of Oh, Hello. Host Seth Meyers is a friend of both Kroll and Mulaney, having previously worked with Mulaney as a writer for Saturday Night Live and Documentary Now!.

=== Comedy Bang! Bang! ===
Faizon and St. Geegland have also appeared as guests in a season five episode of Scott Aukerman's IFC show Comedy Bang! Bang!, alongside The Lonely Island. During their appearance, they talked about their extensive Broadway background, which includes producing the Cats-inspired show Pugs and You Snooze, You Lose, a musical about the Terri Schiavo case. They have also appeared on several episodes of the original Comedy Bang! Bang! podcast.

=== Conan ===
Kroll and Mulaney have appeared in character on an episode of Conan O'Brien's TBS talk-show Conan. The appearance occurred during O'Brien's week of shows taped from the Apollo Theater in New York City, which coincided with the run of Oh, Hello on Broadway. George and Gil appeared during the monologue to give O'Brien a "welcome-back-to-New York-official-basket", consisting of a pre-broken umbrella, a sun-faded photo of Danny Aiello, a cup of three-week-old watermelon, a copy of Fagen's New York, and a gift certificate to St Michael's Cemetery.

=== Chelsea ===
To promote Oh, Hello on Broadway, Kroll and Mulaney appeared in two episodes of the Netflix talk show Chelsea as Faizon and St. Geegland. Host Chelsea Handler also uses "Oh, hello" as her catchphrase to open each show.

=== Portlandia ===
Faizon and St. Geegland appear in the sketch comedy series Portlandia in the episode "Peter Follows P!nk" where they meet series mainstays Toni and Candace (Carrie Brownstein and Fred Armisen) and invite them to a surprise assisted suicide party.

=== Everybody's in LA ===
In the talk show John Mulaney Presents: Everybody's in LA, the pair did a segment where they toured Los Angeles on a Manson tour in fourth episode, PARANORMAL.

== Oh, Hello theatrical run ==
=== Off-Broadway ===
Oh, Hello premiered as an Off-Broadway play on December 1, 2015, and played for several weeks at The Cherry Lane Theatre in New York's Greenwich Village. After the success of this production, Kroll and Mulaney took the show on the road, performing in San Francisco, Chicago, Washington, D.C., Los Angeles, and Boston.

=== Broadway ===
Kroll and Mulaney began a 15-week staging of the show on Broadway at the Lyceum Theater, starting on September 23, 2016, in previews and on October 10 officially. The show closed on January 22, 2017. The show received positive reviews overall. Ben Brantley of The New York Times helped launch the show's success by giving it an unexpected rave review during its off-Broadway run. Entertainment Weekly called it "full of genuine laughs", but also "surprisingly unambitious, with no real story, no attempt to welcome new audiences, no truly great comic moments. It's a sketch, drawn out", giving it a "B". Marilyn Stasio of Variety wrote that "Their pre-established fan base from Comedy Central, alt-comedy clubs and obscure videos should go for this sloppy, silly, occasionally inspired, extended version of their comic shtick as two affected Upper West Side geezers named Gil Faizon and George St. Geegland — but Oh, Hello on Broadway might not be the show to win over new enthusiasts." The show mocks multiple aspects of live theatre that Kroll and Mulaney personally dislike, like fake smoking and one-sided phone calls.

=== Netflix special ===
A recorded performance of the show featuring Steve Martin as the guest and with an appearance by Matthew Broderick was released by Netflix on June 13, 2017. A bonus clip was also released on Netflix featuring Michael J. Fox as the guest. The recorded performance received a positive review from Erik Adams of The A.V. Club, who gave it a "B+" and called it "a singularly funny testament to Kroll and Mulaney's creative partnership and personal friendship". Lea Palmieri of Decider wrote that "Oh, Hello On Broadway might be the most ridiculous Broadway show you watch on Netflix this year, but it's absolutely worth watching." She noted, however, that "trimming about 15 minutes wouldn't have hurt the show."

== Podcast ==
On April 3, 2020, the first episode of Oh, Hello: the P'dcast was released. The comedy podcast covers Gil and George's investigation of Princess Diana's death. Guests across the show's eight episodes included John Oliver, Lin-Manuel Miranda, and Pete Davidson. Time magazine called it one of the best podcasts of 2020.
