= Azar (name) =

Name list

Azar is the common English spelling for several given names and surnames:

- Arabic: عازار, romanized: ʿĀzār, the Arabic name of Lazarus of Bethany
- Persian: آذر, romanized: Āzar, lit. 'fire'
- Hebrew: עֵזֶר, romanized: ʿĒzer, lit. 'helper', cf. Ebenezer (given name)

Āzar is a common boys', girls', and last name in Persian-speaking countries. Azarkade or Atashkade are the fire temples of Zoroastrianism, a religion that originated in Iran. Notable people with the name include:

== Religious figures ==
- Lazarus of Bethany, whom Jesus raised from the dead.
- Azar ibn Nahur, the father figure or biological father of Abraham according to the Quran.

== Given name ==
- Azar Andami (1926–1984), Iranian physician and bacteriologist
- Azar Azima (1927–2026), Iranian singer
- Azar Bigdeli (1722–1781), Iranian anthologist and poet
- Azar Gat (born 1959), Israeli researcher and author on military history
- Azar Karadas (born 1981), Norwegian football player of Turkish descent
- Azar Kayvan, Zoroastrian high priest of Iran who emigrated to India
- Azar Lawrence (born 1952), American jazz saxophonist
- Azar Majedi, Iranian communist activist, writer
- Azar Mansouri (born 1964), Iranian politician
- Azar Mohammadi (born 1974), Iranian costume designer
- Azar Nafisi (born 1955), Iranian academic
- Azar Hekmat Shoar (1935–1974), Iranian actress

== Surname ==
- Alex Azar (born 1967), American lawyer, Secretary of the U.S. Department of Health and Human Services
- Amado Azar (1913–1971), Argentine boxer and Olympian
- Assi Azar (born 1979), Israeli television personality
- Betty Azar, American teacher and the author
- Carla Azar (born 1972), American drummer
- Caroline Azar, Canadian director, actor, and playwright
- Dina Azar (born 1973), Lebanese model, television personality, host, and fashion designer
- Edward Azar (1938–1991), Lebanese professor of government and politics
- Emilè Azar (born 1985), Swedish singer of Lebanese origin
- George Azar (born 1959), Lebanese American photojournalist and documentary film maker
- Habib Azar (born 1979), American film, theater and television director
- Ignatius Isaac Azar (1647–1724), Syriac Orthodox Patriarch of Antioch during 1709–1722
- Jacobo Majluta Azar (1934–1996), Dominican politician of Lebanese origin
- Joseph Azar (prince), Jewish prince of the Anjuvannam in Cochin, South India
- Joseph Azar (singer) (born 1942), Lebanese artist and singer
- Mehdi Azar (1901–1994), Iranian physician and politician
- Mehdi Azar Yazdi (1921–2009), Iranian writer
- Naser Cheshmazar, sometimes spelled Naser Cheshm Azar, (1950–2018), Iranian musician, composer and arranger
- Pablo Azar (born 1982), Mexican actor
- Raymond Azar (born 1953), head of Lebanese military intelligence
- Rick Azar (1929–2021), American broadcaster
- Roberto Azar (born 1966), Argentine tennis player
- Rony Azar (born 1983), Lebanese football (soccer) player
- Steve Azar (born 1964), American country music artist
- Suzie Azar (born 1946), American politician

== See also ==
  - Azar v. Garza
  - United States House of Representatives v. Azar
- Azar (disambiguation)
