= Kyle Jarrow =

American screenwriter

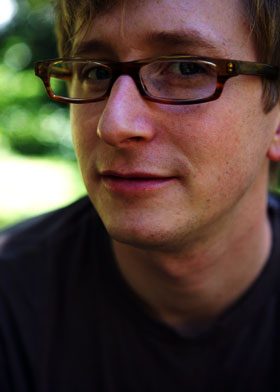
- Born: October 7, 1979 (age 46); Ithaca, New York
- Education: Yale University
- Occupations: Writer, musician
- Years active: 2003–present
- Notable work: The SpongeBob Musical, Valor, Armless, Whisper House, A Very Merry Unauthorized Children's Scientology Pageant, Sky-Pony
- Spouse: Lauren Worsham (m. 2011)

Kyle Jarrow (born October 7, 1979) is a Los Angeles–based writer and rock musician.

== Career ==
=== Writing ===
Jarrow's writing career began in theater, winning an Obie Award with director Alex Timbers in 2004 for A Very Merry Unauthorized Children's Scientology Pageant, a satirical musical about L. Ron Hubbard and Scientology. His theatrical writing has been noted for its macabre humor and frequent incorporation of pop music. Early credits include Armless, the basis for the film of the same name, and Whisper House, a musical written with Duncan Sheik. As Jarrow's career progressed he became frustrated with the reach of theater and began writing for television and film as well.

Jarrow's writing for television and film has frequently focused on existential questions of what to believe and how to live. His first feature film was 2010 Sundance Film Festival NEXT selection Armless, a comedy about a man suffering body integrity identity disorder, starring Daniel London and Janel Moloney. Armless was directed by Habib Azar, with whom Jarrow collaborated again in 2014 on Saint Janet, an independent film about a woman who believes she has spoken to God, starring Kelly Bishop and Nyambi Nyambi.

In 2012 Jarrow developed a police drama for FX produced by Philip Seymour Hoffman. In 2013 The CW announced development of Ze, a family drama series written by Jarrow about a transgender teen. Ze would have represented the first time a transgender person has been the lead character on a broadcast television show. In 2016, Kyle created Lost Generation, a digital series with music by Duncan Sheik for Verizon's go90 network. He is the creator and executive producer of the military drama TV series Valor which premiered on The CW network in October 2017 and is now streaming on Netflix.

Kyle wrote the book for SpongeBob SquarePants, The Broadway Musical which opened at Broadway's Palace Theatre in December 2017. He has been nominated for a Tony Award, Drama Desk Award, and Outer Critics Association Award for his work on the show. In 2022 was released a film Purple Hearts which was written by Kyle Jarrow.

=== Music ===
Jarrow is singer, songwriter, and keyboardist for the theatrical rock band Sky-Pony, a collaboration with his wife Lauren Worsham. He has previously performed with bands Super Mirage and The Fabulous Entourage, an art rock band featured in the 2006 Whitney Biennial.

== Personal life ==
Jarrow was born and raised in Ithaca, New York. His father is economist Robert A. Jarrow and his mother, Gail Jarrow, writes children's books. He studied Religious Studies and American Studies at Yale University, moving to New York City upon graduation. Jarrow lives in Los Angeles, California with his wife, actress Lauren Worsham. In December 2015, Worsham and Jarrow announced they were expecting their first child, Oona. In December 2019, the couple announced the arrival of their second daughter on Facebook.

== Works ==
=== Theater ===
- President Harding is a Rock Star (2003) - Book, music, and lyrics
- A Very Merry Unauthorized Children's Scientology Pageant (2004) - Book, music, and lyrics - Obie Award
- Armless (2004) - Playwright - Overall Excellence Award, NY Fringe Festival
- Gorilla Man - Book, music, and lyrics (2005)
- Rip Me Open - co-creator with Desiree Burch, Michael Cyril Creighton, and Brian Mullin (2006)
- Love Kills - Book, music, and lyrics (2007)
- Hostage Song - Music and lyrics; book by Clay McLeod Chapman (2008)
- The List (2010)
- Whisper House - Book; music by Duncan Sheik; lyrics by Jarrow and Sheik (2010)
- Trigger - Playwright (2011)
- The Consequences - Book; music and lyrics by Jarrow and Nathan Leigh (2012)
- Sky-Pony: Raptured - Music and lyrics (2012)
- Noir - Book; music by Duncan Sheik; lyrics by Jarrow and Sheik (2015)
- The Wildness (2016) - Music and lyrics; book by Jarrow and Lauren Worsham Lortel Award nomination
- The SpongeBob Musical - Book (2017)

=== Television ===
- Lost Generation (2016) go90
- Valor (2017–18) The CW Network
- The Drop (in pre-production)
- Star Trek: Discovery, Season Four (2022)

=== Film ===
- Armless (2010)
- Saint Janet (2014)
- Purple Hearts (2022)
