= Melissa Wells =

Melissa Wells may refer to:

- Melissa Wells (politician), American politician in the Maryland House of Delegates
- Melissa F. Wells (born 1932), U.S. diplomat
- Melissa Walton (married name Wells, born 1990), British actress
- Melissa "Wellsy" Wells, portrayed by sportscaster Danyelle Sargent on the U.S. television show Onion SportsDome
