= Theatre kid =

Cultural stereotype of actors

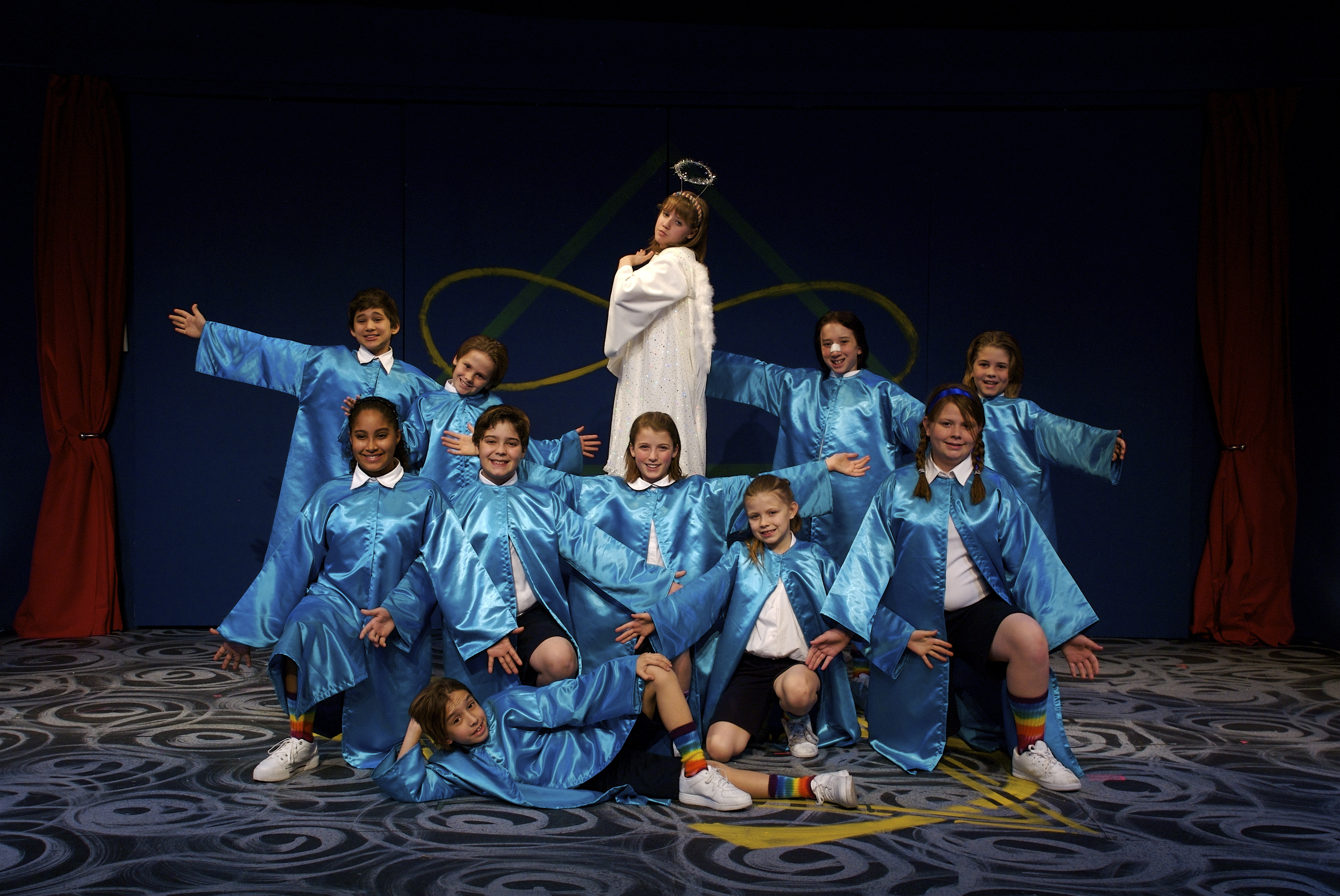
The child cast of a production of A Very Merry Unauthorized Children's Scientology Pageant

A theatre kid or theater kid is a common stereotype of a young actor, usually a student, who openly displays a talent and/or passion for performance. Common traits associated with the stereotype include obsession with or devotion to school plays, the tendency to spontaneously perform or quote lyrics in everyday social situations, and a personal obsession with musicals.

== In popular culture ==
Examples of the theatre kid stereotype have appeared in various film and television productions, including Glee and High School Musical. A "theatre kid" subculture exists on TikTok, with The Michigan Daily noting that the content posted to the "theatrekid" tag (and related topics) has amassed billions of views.

== Notable examples ==
In an interview with Vanity Fair, Andrew Garfield called himself a theatre kid, saying "I wear that badge proudly." Rachel Zegler has identified with the label.

New York Times reporter Madison Malone Kircher wrote in 2023 that "Grown-up theater kids run the world". She listed several political and media figures with theatrical performing backgrounds, including US Supreme Court justice Ketanji Brown Jackson, US Senator Ted Cruz, political commentator Chris Hayes, and New Jersey governor Phil Murphy, among others. Citing Chris Hayes, she wrote:

“‘Pick me, look at me’ is the dominant cultural ethos,” Mr. Hayes continued, adding that theater kids’ joining the professional world is “like releasing an apex predator into an ecosystem.”
