= D. Keith Mano =

American writer and political commentator (1942–2016)

- Mano in 1971, photographed by Jill Krementz
- Born: David Keith Mano; February 12, 1942; Manhattan, New York, U.S.
- Died: September 14, 2016 (aged 74); Manhattan, New York, U.S.
- Education: Columbia University (BA); Clare College, Cambridge
- Occupation: Political commentator

David Keith Mano (February 12, 1942 – September 14, 2016) was an American writer and political commentator, known for his work for the magazine National Review.

== Early life ==
Mano attended New York's Trinity School (where, he claimed, he converted to Episcopalianism in order to be eligible for a prize) and Columbia University, where he was a student of Lionel Trilling.

He subsequently received a Kellett Fellowship and spent a year at Clare College, Cambridge, where he was a student of F. R. Leavis, and performed as part of the Marlowe Society.

Upon returning to the United States, he performed with the National Shakespeare Company while also managing his family's construction business.

== Writing ==
Mano's first novel, Bishop's Progress, was published in 1968. His next five novels were published one per year until 1973; Jeffrey Hart noted that Mano's seventh novel, Take Five, took nine years to write — which, in Hart's assessment, "wrecked [Mano] as a commercial possibility". Mano later published two more novels, for a total of nine.

From 1972 to 1989, Mano's column "The Gimlet Eye" was published in National Review, where he was listed on the masthead; he was also listed as a contributing editor at Playboy, and provided book reviews for Esquire and movie reviews for Oui.

During the 1980s, he began writing for television, and produced scripts for the television series Monsters and LA Law and Homicide: Life on the Street; he also wrote the episode of St. Elsewhere for which Steve Allen was nominated for the 1987 Primetime Emmy Award for Outstanding Guest Actor in a Drama Series.

== Personal life ==
Mano had two sons from his first marriage to Jo McArthur., and was married later to actress Laurie Kennedy.

During the 1970s he abandoned Episcopalianism for a variety of reasons, reportedly including his refusal to be given the Eucharist by a woman. He subsequently joined the Eastern Orthodox Church.

During the mid-1990s, Mano developed Parkinson's disease.

== Publications ==
- Bishop's Progress : A Novel (Boston : Houghton Mifflin, 1968)
- Horn (Boston : Houghton Mifflin, 1969)
- War Is Heaven! (Garden City, NY : Doubleday, 1970)
- Death and Life of Harry Goth (New York : Knopf, 1971)
- Proselytizer (New York : Knopf, 1972)
- Bridge (Garden City, NY : Doubleday, 1973)
- Take Five (Garden City, NY : Doubleday, 1982)
- Topless (New York : Random House, 1991)
- The Fergus Dialogues: A Meditation on the Gender of Christ (International Scholars Publications, 1998)
