= Concussion (2013 film) =

- Film poster
- Directed by: Stacie Passon
- Written by: Stacie Passon
- Produced by: Cliff Chenfeld; Anthony Cupo; Rose Troche
- Starring: Robin Weigert; Maggie Siff; Ben Shenkman; Janel Moloney; Emily Kinney
- Cinematography: David Kruta
- Edited by: Anthony Cupo
- Music by: Barb Morrison
- Production companies: 93 Films; Razorwire Films
- Distributed by: RADiUS-TWC
- Release dates: January 19, 2013 (Sundance); February 2013 (Berlin); October 4, 2013
- Running time: 96 minutes
- Country: United States
- Language: English
- Box office: $78,957

Concussion is a 2013 American drama film written and directed by Stacie Passon and starring Robin Weigert. Although not autobiographical, the story was partially inspired by Passon herself suffering a mild concussion, in the same manner depicted in the film, shortly before she began writing the screenplay.

== Plot ==
Abby Ableman is a 42-year-old apartment flipper and interior designer with a routine domestic life and obligations. One afternoon, Abby's son Jake accidentally hits her on the head with a baseball and she is rushed to the emergency room by her wife, Kate, a divorce attorney. After being diagnosed with a concussion, Abby spends the next few days in a daze and begins to rethink her life. Kate falls asleep on Abby as they try to have sex.

After an unsatisfying sexual encounter with a prostitute, Abby makes arrangements through her employee, Justin, to sleep with a young woman named Gretchen. The two women discuss how Gretchen uses this line of work to pay for college and that she loves having access to sexual encounters. Abby realizes that she also enjoys having access to new sexual encounters as they provide an escape from her monotonous life; she decides to take clients on a weekly basis. She meets with The Girl, Justin's business partner and new girlfriend, who agrees to send interested women to Abby in exchange for a small fee. Abby creates her alias, Eleanor, and meets with every potential client at a coffee shop as a precaution, only inviting them to her private loft to have sex if she deems them safe.

Soon enough, Abby has sexual encounters with a wide variety of women, eventually becoming entangled with Sam Bennet, whom she recognizes from spin class. Like Abby, Sam finds herself in a nuclear family which includes a successful spouse (a husband in Sam's case), children, and plenty of money, yet feels an emptiness inside her. Abby's interest in Sam grows as she contemplates spending more time than just their sexual encounters together.

Later, Abby attempts to have sex with Kate but comes off as too aggressive, leading Kate to call it off. Abby meets with Justin about which clients she wants to keep, prompting Justin to ask Abby if this is what she really wants to be doing with her life. Put off by this, Abby meets with The Girl at a coffee shop, where she cuts Justin out of the deal. After another sexual encounter, Abby misses picking up her kids from school, leading to a disagreement with Kate. Days later, Kate takes one of her divorce clients to tour the loft in the hopes of selling it. Abby acts disinterested as Justin pushes for the loft to be sold. The following night, Abby sees Sam with her husband Graham at the supermarket. She keeps her distance at first and observes how they seem to be a perfectly happy couple. Abby innocently introduces herself to Graham before making awkward conversation with Sam and leaving the store by herself.

In time, Kate begins to suspect the encounters. She walks into the loft one day and finds a sleeping Abby, still naked from her most recent session. At home, Abby is on the phone with a client when Kate suddenly drives off. Abby chases after Kate but instead runs into Sam. Abby confronts Sam about their secret relationship, concluding that their sexual encounters were simply due to shared boredom. When Kate returns, Abby questions her wife why she never seems to want her. Kate confesses that she doesn't want anybody, including Abby.

Abby sells the loft to Kate's recent divorce client and returns to her ordinary life with her wife and children. During spin class, she tells her friend Pru about all the maintenance she has to do on the house and on a new loft before the upcoming family trip to Argentina. When Pru asks her what she really wants, Abby echoes Sam and replies that she wants to take a hot yoga class.

== Cast ==
- Robin Weigert as Abby Ableman / Eleanor
- Maggie Siff as Sam Bennet / #6
- Julie Fain Lawrence as Kate Ableman
- Johnathan Tchaikovsky as Justin Myers
- Janel Moloney as Pru
- Funda Duval as Sarah
- Claudine Ohayon as Lisa
- Emily Kinney as The Girl / Justin's Girlfriend
- Maren Shapero as Mayer Ableman
- Micah Shapero as Jake Ableman
- Ben Shenkman as Graham Bennet
- Daniel London as Evan
- Anthony Cupo as Walter
- Judd Harner as Clark
- Kate Rogal as Gretchen
- Anna George as Dr. Jofar
- Daria Feneis as Woman #1
- Tracee Chimo as Woman #2
- Laila Robins as Woman #3
- Mimi Ferraro as Woman #4
- Erika Latta as Woman #5
- Cleo Gray as Woman #7

== Release ==
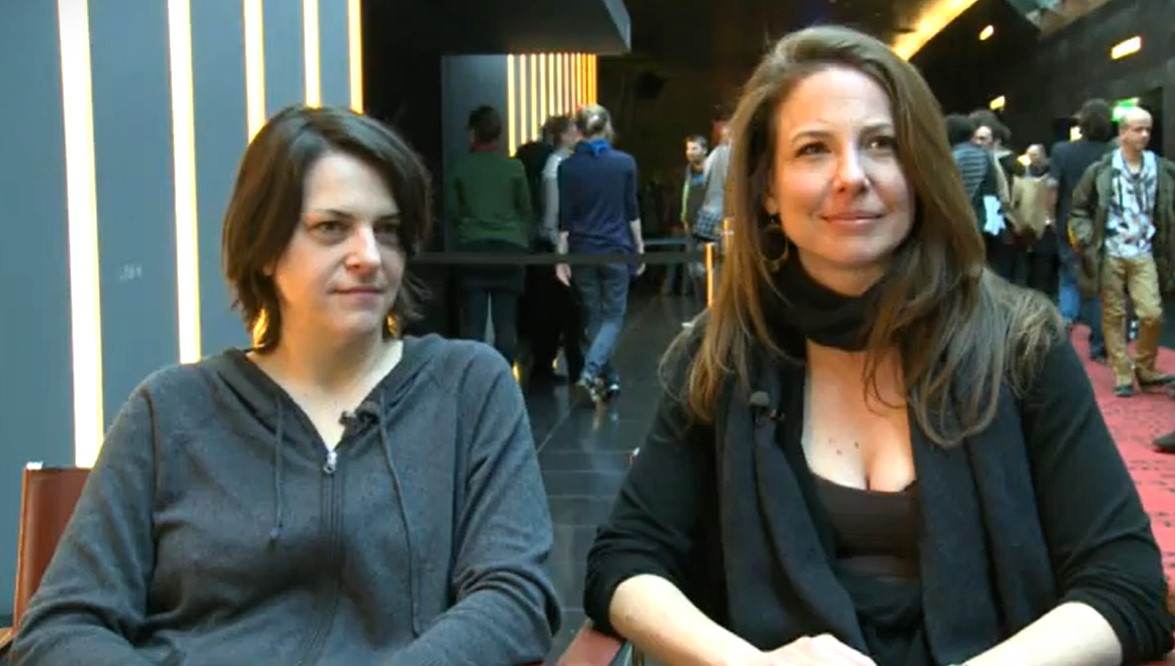
Concussion director Stacie Passon and actress Robin Weigert interviewed for the Teddy Award of the Berlin International Film Festival

The film premiered at the 2013 Sundance Film Festival and the 2013 Berlin International Film Festival. At Sundance, it secured a deal with The Weinstein Company for general release later in 2013. At Berlin, the film won a Teddy Award Jury Prize as an outstanding film about LGBT themes.

== Critical reception ==
Concussion received generally positive reviews, currently holding a 75% approval rating on Rotten Tomatoes based on 59 reviews, with an average score of 6.47/10; the consensus states: "Smart, nuanced, and sexy, Concussion transcends its more awkward moments thanks to Robin Weigert's remarkable starring performance." On Metacritic, the film has a 56/100 rating, based on reviews from 19 critics, indicating "mixed or average" reviews.
