= Armless =

- Directed by: Habib Azar
- Written by: Kyle Jarrow
- Produced by: Habib Azar; Hsiano Bian
- Starring: Daniel London; Janel Moloney; Matt Walton; Zoe Lister-Jones; Laurie Kennedy
- Cinematography: Orson Robbins-Pianka
- Edited by: Sarah Smith
- Music by: Habib Azar; Kyle Jarrow; Nathan Leigh; Performed by the band Super Mirage
- Release date: January 22, 2010 (Sundance)
- Running time: 82 minutes
- Country: United States
- Language: English

Armless is a 2010 comedy film directed by Habib Azar and starring Daniel London, Janel Moloney, Matt Walton, Zoe Lister-Jones and Laurie Kennedy. It was written by Kyle Jarrow.

It was an official selection of the 2010 Sundance Film Festival, as part of the new category 'NEXT' which selects films for their innovative and original work in low- and no-budget filmmaking.

== Premise ==
The film tells the story of John, a man who has a psychological condition known as body integrity identity disorder in which an individual does not feel "whole" unless he loses one or more major limbs. John leaves his wife and goes to New York City to find a doctor to amputate his arms.

== Production ==
Armless is Habib Azar's first feature film. It was made in New York City with additional filming in Gillette, New Jersey. The film was shot in 12 days from March 20 to April 2, 2008.
