= Onion SportsDome =

- Starring: Matt Walton; Matt Oberg; Danyelle Sargent
- Country of origin: United States
- Original language: English
- No. of seasons: 1
- No. of episodes: 10

Production
- Running time: 22 minutes

Original release
- Network: Comedy Central
- Release: January 11 – March 15, 2011

Related
- Onion News Network

Onion SportsDome was a parody sports television show from the makers of The Onion. The show premiered on Tuesday, January 11, 2011, at 10:30 p.m. EST on Comedy Central in the United States. It was seen in Canada on The Comedy Network.

The show was designed as a parody of SportsCenter and ESPN. Jack Kukoda was the head writer. Matt Walton and Matt Oberg play the co-anchors Alex Reiser and Mark Shepard, respectively. Melissa "Wellsy" Wells was portrayed by real-life sportscaster Danyelle Sargent. Gary Payton, Dennis Kenney and Ahmad Bradshaw appeared on the show.

On April 4, 2011, USA Today reported the show, having completed its original 10-episode runs, was on hiatus and replaced in the time-slot by Sports Show with Norm Macdonald. On June 20, 2011, Deadline Hollywood confirmed that Comedy Central cancelled both SportsDome and Sports Show with Norm Macdonald.
