= Choices (1986 film) =

- Genre: Drama
- Written by: Judith Parker
- Directed by: David Lowell Rich
- Starring: George C. Scott; Jacqueline Bisset; Melissa Gilbert
- Music by: Charles Gross
- Country of origin: United States
- Original language: English

Production
- Producer: Robert Halmi
- Production location: Montreal
- Cinematography: Robert Baldwin
- Editor: Eric Albertson
- Running time: 95 minutes
- Production company: Robert Halmi, Inc.

Original release
- Network: ABC
- Release: February 17, 1986

Choices is a 1986 American made-for-television drama film starring George C. Scott, Jacqueline Bisset and Melissa Gilbert, directed by David Lowell Rich. The film focuses on Evan Granger, a 62-year-old judge who rethinks his opposition to abortion when he finds out both his 19-year-old daughter Terry and 38-year-old wife Marisa are pregnant.

Producer Robert Halmi first pitched the film to NBC and CBS, but both networks turned it down. ABC accepted on the condition that the film examine both sides of the abortion issue. The film was broadcast on ABC on February 17, 1986.

== Plot ==
Evan Granger is a prominent Manhattan judge who is soon to retire. He is married to his second wife, the 38-year-old concert pianist Marisa. Terry, Evan's college-aged daughter from his first marriage, returns home on a break from school. After Terry vomits, she discloses to Marisa that she is pregnant. A supportive Marisa prods Terry to tell her father. He becomes enraged when Terry tells him the news and that she is considering an abortion without informing Scott, her ex-boyfriend who dumped her. Scott is anti-abortion, believing it to be on par with murder.

While Marisa supports Terry's decision, Evan is morally opposed against abortion and believes his daughter doesn't have the right to go ahead with the procedure. Terry protests, arguing that having a baby now will interfere with her law school plans. When Scott learns of Terry's pregnancy, he insists on marrying her and that she carry the fetus to term.

Meanwhile, Marisa, despite an agreement with her husband to not have children of their own, discovers she is pregnant as well. In contrast to his reaction to Terry's pregnancy, Evan is against Marisa having the baby, as he does not want to be at a "high school graduation when [he's] 80." Marisa herself wants to keep the baby. Evan, Marisa, and Terry are all forced to make important choices.

== Cast ==
- George C. Scott as Evan Granger
- Jacqueline Bisset as Marisa Granger
- Melissa Gilbert as Terry Granger
- Laurie Kennedy as Ellen
- Steven Flynn as Scott
- Nancy Allison as Norma
- Daliah Novak as Janet
- Lorena Gale as Clinic Staffer

== Critical reception ==
The Chicago Tribune gave a negative review and said the film would have been better off if it focused on the married couple plot; instead, "it is diluted through contrived coincidence and character manipulation, and ends up as overambitious and unsatisfying, down to the tidied-up resolution". In The New York Times, John J. O'Connor wrote the film "carefully touches on the weightier arguments against and in favor of abortion rights, and then, in typical television-movie fashion, ends up squarely in the middle of things, with a smidgen of consolation for all sides. Commercial television is still squeamish about antagonizing potential consumers of any stripe". However, he commented the "story is carried by Miss Bisset and Miss Gilbert, both of whom are impressively effective even as they grapple with the slippery script".
