= Les Freres Corbusier =

Les Freres Corbusier is a New York based theatre company, founded in 2003 by three then-recent Yale graduates Alex Timbers, Aaron Lemon-Strauss, and Jennifer Rogien. It is led by Artistic Director Timbers. Its most recent production was "Love's Labour's Lost" in 2013 and had several new shows in active development as of 2014. Here's Hoover! premiered at Abrons Arts Center in December 2014.

== Productions ==
Les Freres Corbusier is responsible for the Broadway production of Bloody Bloody Andrew Jackson. Other works include Love's Labour's Lost at Shakespeare in the Park 2013, Heddatron, Hell House, Boozy, Dance Dance Revolution, President Harding is a Rock Star, The Franklin Thesis, and A Very Merry Unauthorized Children's Scientology Pageant.

Les Freres is devoted to creating irreverent work that re-envisions well-known historical figures in new idioms and contexts, which allow for their fresh reappraisal and suggest contemporary relevancies. The company makes aggressively visceral theater that combines historical revisionism, sophomoric humor, and rigorous academic research. Les Freres is committed to the notion of a Populist Theater that draws on prevailing pop cultural tastes and comedic sensibilities to speak directly to a mainstream audience. Timbers stated "The idea of mixing comedy and politics has been around as long as mankind has been doing theater." Referring to Bloody Bloody Andrew Jackson, he noted that "It’s political theater, but one that happens to have this giddy, pop-rock soundtrack."

With Heddatron, "Les Freres Corbusier claims to be forging on in its 'irreverent massacre of historical icons and academic esoterica by taking on famed playwright Henrik Ibsen, the well-made play, and contemporary issues in robotics.'"

== Awards and honors ==
- Love's Labour's Lost was named one of the best shows of 2013 in The New York Times by Charles Isherwood.
- Bloody Bloody Andrew Jackson was nominated for two 2011 Tony Awards: Best Book of a Musical and Best Scenic Design. It won an LA Critics Award for "Best Score" for composer Michael Friedman, as well as a Drama Desk Award for "Best Book of a Musical" for writer Alex Timbers. The musical won the Lucille Lortel Award and Outer Critics Circle Award for "Best Musical" and the Broadway.com Audience Award for "Favorite Off-Broadway Musical".
- Hell House was nominated for a 2007 Drama Desk Award for "Unique Theatrical Experience".
- Heddatron won the 2006 George Oppenheimer Award from Newsday.
- Boozy was named "Ten Best of 2005" by both the New York Daily News and Time Out New York. Its video design, by Jacob Pinholster, was nominated for a 2005 American Theatre Wing Hewes Design Award. The script was published, with a foreword by playwright Timbers, by Theater Magazine.
- A Very Merry Unauthorized Children's Scientology Pageant was the winner of two 2005 Backstage West GARLAND Awards for its LA Production including "Best Production" and "Best Director". Its New York production won an Obie Award. The cast recording was released on Sh-K-Boom Records.
- The Franklin Thesis was named "Best of New York 2004" by The Village Voice and was the winner of "Best in Festival" at the 2002 American Living Room Festival.
