= Heddatron =

2006 play

- Written by: Elizabeth Meriwether
- Subject: Hedda Gabler
- Setting: Ypsilanti, Michigan

Premiere
- Date premiered: 2006
- Place premiered: HERE Arts Center

Heddatron is a 2006 play by Elizabeth Meriwether. The play is an adaptation of Henrik Ibsen's Hedda Gabler. It premiered at the HERE Arts Centre in New York City as directed by Alex Timbers and starred Carolyn Baeumler as Jane.

== Characters ==
Humans:

- Jane Gordon
- Nugget Gordon, Jane's 10-year-old daughter and the play's narrator
- Rick Gordon, Jane's husband
- Cubby Gordon, Rick's brother
- Henrik Ibsen
- Mrs. Ibsen
- August Strindberg
- Else, a maid
- Strindberg's Monkey
- Film student
- Engineer

Robots:

- Hans, plays Eilert Lovborg
- Billy, plays George Tesman (Hedda's husband)
- Brack-Bot, plays Judge Brack
- Aunt Julie-Bot
- Berta-Bot

== Plot ==
In 2006 in Ypsilanti, Michigan, Nugget Gordon, a precocious ten-year-old girl, gives a presentation to her class about Henrik Ibsen. Her presentation is interspersed with scenes of Ibsen, his wife, their maid, and Ibsen's rival, August Strindberg. There are also scenes of Nugget's family as her father and uncle attempt to make a documentary. As the first act progresses, it becomes clear that Nugget's pregnant mother, Jane, has been kidnapped by robots and taken to the rainforest. In the second act of the play, the robots force Jane to play the role of Hedda Gabler in their performance of the play of the same name. Cubby and Rick attempt to rescue Jane from the robots and Jane tries to commit suicide by shooting herself in the head. In the third act, the family has returned to Michigan and must deal with the aftermath of Jane's suicide attempt. Nugget finishes her presentation on Ibsen.

== Production history ==
The play premiered in 2006, marking the centenary of Ibsen's death, with Les Freres Corbusier. It was directed by Alex Timbers at the HERE Arts Center. Carolyn Baeumler starred as Jane. The robots for the premiere were designed by Botmatrix's Cindy Jeffers and Meredith Finkelstein.

Salvage Vanguard Theater in Austin, Texas performed Heddatron in 2011. In 2012, Ion Theatre in San Diego performed Heddatron starring Monique Gaffney as Jane and directed by Claudio Raygoza. In 2017, the Boise State University Department of Theatre Arts performed Heddatron under the direction of Michael Baltzell. In the spring of 2022, the Skidmore College Department of Theater staged Heddatron in the Janet Kinghorn Bernhard Theater, directed by Dennis Schebetta and starring Sophie Pettit as Jane.
