= Man and Superman =

1903 four-act drama by George Bernard Shaw

- Lillah McCarthy as Ann Whitefield and Harley Granville Barker as John Tanner, 1905
- Original language: English
- Written by: Bernard Shaw
- Genre: "Comedy and philosophy"

Premiere
- Date: 21 May 1905
- Place: Court Theatre, London

Man and Superman is a four-act drama written by Bernard Shaw in 1903 and premiered at the Court Theatre in London on 21 May 1905. The first production – like most subsequent ones – omitted a dream sequence, Don Juan in Hell, from the third act. That episode was first given at the Court in 1907. The play humorously illustrates the theories of the philosopher Friedrich Nietzsche that humanity will evolve to superman status and that it is women, rather than men, who drive the process.

The play was staged with success on Broadway within months of the West End premiere and has been revived many times in Britain, North America and elsewhere. It has also been adapted for radio and television.

== Background ==
Shaw established a reputation as a dramatist during the 1890s with plays including Arms and the Man (1894), The Devil's Disciple (1897) and Caesar and Cleopatra (1898) and by the start of the twentieth century he was recognised as an important figure in the British theatre. The drama critic A. B. Walkley suggested that Shaw should write a play based on the Don Juan legend. (Note: Shaw's introduction to the published play is in the form of an "Epistle Dedicatory to Arthur Bingham Walkley", which begins, "My dear Walkley, You once asked me why I did not write a Don Juan play. The levity with which you assumed this frightful responsibility has probably by this time enabled you to forget it; but the day of reckoning has arrived: here is your play!") In May 1900 Shaw began sketching a Parliament in Hell between Don Juan and the Devil. His biographer Michael Holroyd writes, "Around the Socratic debate he composed a three-act comedy, completing the scenario between 2 July and 8 October 1901. … in June 1902, this many-layered work, now called Man and Superman. A Comedy and a Philosophy, was finished". Shaw immediately worked on a revised draft and in January 1903 he read it aloud to his friends Beatrice and Sidney Webb, who were enthusiastic about the piece.

== First productions ==
The main body of the play – without the Act 3 dream sequence Don Juan in Hell – was first given by the Incorporated Stage Society at a matinee at the Court Theatre, London, on 21 May 1905. From the third performance (23 May) the play was presented by the Granville Barker-Vedrenne management as part of a series of matinees they were presenting. There were fourteen matinee performances of the play in this first run. The piece was given at 68 evening and matinee performances at the Court between 23 October and 30 December 1905 with mainly the original cast. Further performances were presented at the same theatre by the same management in 1906 (61 performances) and 1907 (35 performances).

Role	May/June 1905	Oct/Dec 1905	Oct/Dec 1906	May/June 1907
Roebuck Ramsden	Charles Goodheart	J. H. Barnes	James Hearn	James Hearn
Octavius Robinson	Lewis Casson	Lewis Casson	Lewis Casson	Lewis Casson
John "Jack" Tanner	Harley Granville Barker	Harley Granville Barker	Robert Loraine	Robert Loraine
Henry Straker	Edmund Gwenn	Edmund Gwenn	Edmund Gwenn	Edmund Gwenn
Hector Malone Jr	Hubert Harben	James Carew	Hubert Harben	Denis Eadie
Hector Malone Sr	J. D. Beveridge	F. Cremlin	Edmund Gurney	Edmund Gurney
Ann Whitefield	Lillah McCarthy	Lillah McCarthy	Lillah McCarthy	Lillah McCarthy
Mrs Whitefield	Florence Haydon	Florence Haydon	Florence Haydon	Florence Haydon
Susan Ramsden	Agnes Thomas	Agnes Thomas	Agnes Thomas	Agnes Thomas
Violet Robinson	Grace Lane	Sarah Brooke	Grace Lane	Sarah Brooke
Parlourmaid	Hazel Thompson	Hazel Thompson	Mary Hamilton	Mary Hamilton

The first performance of the Don Juan in Hell episode was at the Court on 4 June 1907 in a series of eight matinee performances presented by the Granville Barker-Vedrenne management, with Loraine as Don Juan, Michael Sherbrook as the statue, Norman McKinnel as the Devil and McCarthy as Doña Ana.

== Summary ==
Mr Whitefield has recently died, and his will indicates that his daughter Ann should be left in the care of two men, Roebuck Ramsden and John Tanner. Ramsden, a venerable old man, distrusts John Tanner, an eloquent youth with revolutionary ideas, whom Shaw's stage directions describe as "prodigiously fluent of speech, restless, excitable (mark the snorting nostril and the restless blue eye, just the thirty-secondth of an inch too wide open), possibly a little mad". In spite of what Ramsden says, Ann accepts Tanner as her guardian, though Tanner does not want the position at all. She also challenges Tanner's revolutionary beliefs with her own ideas. Despite Tanner's professed dedication to anarchy, he is unable to disarm Ann's charm, and she ultimately persuades him to marry her, choosing him over her more persistent suitor, a young man, Tanner's friend, named Octavius Robinson.

== Characters ==
- Roebuck Ramsden, an ageing civil reformer who was friend to the late Mr Whitefield. He corresponds to the statue in the Don Juan myth, who is in turn the representation of the spirit of Don Gonzalo, the father of Doña Ana (in Act III, Shaw writes of The Statue, "His voice, save for a much more distinguished intonation, is so like the voice of Roebuck Ramsden").
- Octavius Robinson, an amiable young man who is in love with Ann Whitefield. Brother to Violet Robinson. He represents "Don Ottavio" from the Don Juan myth.

Robert Loraine as Jack Tanner, 1911

- John "Jack" Tanner, a well-educated, well-spoken man who takes everything seriously, including himself; a "political firebrand and confirmed bachelor." Allegedly the descendant of Don Juan, as well as the modern representation of the Don Juan character (in Act III, Shaw notes Don Juan's resemblance to Tanner: "Besides, in the brief lifting of his face, now hidden by his hat brim, there was a curious suggestion of Tanner. A more critical, fastidious, handsome face, paler and colder, without Tanner's impetuous credulity and enthusiasm, and without a touch of his modern plutocratic vulgarity, but still a resemblance, even an identity"). The name "John Tanner" is an anglicisation of the Spanish name "Juan Tenorio", which is the full name of Don Juan.
- Henry Straker, chauffeur with a cockney accent (representing Leporello from the Mozart opera).
- Hector Malone Jr, an American gentleman who is secretly married to Violet Robinson.
- Hector Malone Sr, an elderly gentleman who has worked hard throughout his life to attain a high social status in which he now takes pride.
- Ann Whitefield, a young woman, graceful, somewhat enigmatic. She corresponds to the character Doña Ana in the Don Juan myth (in Act III, Shaw's stage direction refers to Doña Ana de Ulloa as "so handsome that in the radiance into which her dull yellow halo has suddenly lightened one might almost mistake her for Ann Whitefield").
- Mrs Whitefield, mother of Ann, and widow of the late Mr Whitefield.
- Susan Ramsden, unmarried sister of Roebuck Ramsden.
- Violet Robinson, sister of Octavius Robinson. She has been secretly married to Hector Malone Jr.
- Mendoza, an anarchist who collaborates with Tanner. Mendoza is the "President of the League of the Sierra," a self-described brigand. He corresponds to Shaw's conception of the Devil as he would be portrayed in the Don Juan myth (Shaw writes of "The Devil" in Act III: "A scarlet halo begins to glow; and into it the Devil rises, very Mephistophelean, and not at all unlike Mendoza, though not so interesting").

== Interpretation ==
=== Act III / Don Juan in Hell ===
The long third act of the play, which shows Don Juan himself having a conversation with several characters in Hell, is often cut. Charles A. Berst observes of Act III:

Paradoxically, the act is both extraneous and central to the drama which surrounds it. It can be dispensed with, and usually is, on grounds that it is just too long to include in an already full-length play. More significantly, it is in some aspects a digression, operates in a different mode from the rest of the material, delays the immediate well-made story line, and much of its subject matter is already implicit in the rest of the play. The play performs well without it.

Don Juan in Hell consists of a philosophical debate between Don Juan (played by the same actor who plays Jack Tanner), and the Devil, with Doña Ana (Ann) and the Statue of Don Gonzalo, Ana's father (Roebuck Ramsden) looking on. This third act is sometimes performed separately as a play in its own right. In 1974–1975, Kurt Kasznar, Myrna Loy, Edward Mulhare and Ricardo Montalbán toured nationwide in John Houseman's production, playing 158 cities in six months.

=== Ideas ===
The play is described by Shaw as "a comedy and a philosophy". Although it can be performed as a light comedy of manners, Shaw intended the drama to be something deeper, as suggested by the title, which comes from Friedrich Nietzsche's philosophical ideas about the "Übermensch" (although Shaw distances himself from Nietzsche by placing the philosopher at the very end of a long list of influences). As Shaw notes in his "Epistle Dedicatory" (dedication to the critic A. B. Walkley) he wrote the play as "a pretext for a propaganda of our own views of life". The plot centres on John Tanner, author of "The Revolutionist's Handbook and Pocket Companion", which is published with the play as a 58-page appendix. Both in the play and in the "Handbook" Shaw takes Nietzsche's theme that mankind is evolving, through natural selection, towards "superman" and develops the argument to suggest that the prime mover in selection is the woman: Ann Whitefield makes persistent efforts to entice Tanner to marry her yet he remains a bachelor. As Shaw himself puts it: "Don Juan had changed his sex and become Dona Juana, breaking out of the Doll's House and asserting herself as an individual". This is an explicit, intended reversal of Tirso de Molina's play The Trickster of Seville and the Stone Guest, more widely known as the source of Da Ponte's Don Giovanni; here Ann, representing Doña Ana, is the predator – "Don Juan is the quarry instead of the huntsman," as Shaw notes.

Ann is referred to as "the Life Force" and represents Shaw's view that in every culture, it is the women who force the men to marry them rather than the men who take the initiative. Sally Peters Vogt proposes: "Thematically, the fluid Don Juan myth becomes a favorable milieu for Creative Evolution", and that "the legend ... becomes in Man and Superman the vehicle through which Shaw communicates his cosmic philosophy".

== Critical reception ==
After the Broadway premiere in 1905 the New York correspondent of The Daily Telegraph reported:

It is hardly any exaggeration to say that Mr Charles Frohman's production of Mr G. Bernard Shaw's Man and Superman at the Hudson Theatre last night has taken theatrical critics here by storm. Brilliant, witty, audacious, full of life and sharp epigram, strictly unconventional, iridescent Bernardian farce at its most intellectual stage – these are some of the adjectives and descriptions culled at random from the headlines of this morning's leading papers, describing the first night's performance.

The New York Times said, "It was a brilliant comedy, acted to perfection".

The Oxford Dictionary of Plays comments that Man and Superman can be enjoyed "as a comedy in which the girl gets her man", or, "especially through the Don Juan in Hell scenes ... as a philosophical debate which informs the comic outcome". The dictionary adds

The comedy sparkles with wit and presents well-drawn characters, even in the sub-plot involving Ann's sister. The philosophical debates, though protracted for modern theatrical taste, are lively and thought-provoking in their discussion of the Life Force, derived from the thinking of Nietzsche and Bergson.

In the view of the literary critic John Sutherland, "the story is full of coincidences and melodramatic happenings, but there is invariably something ironic or paradoxical about them". For Sutherland the play is "heavily imbued with Shavian metaphysics" and he notes that Shaw describes the Don Juan in Hell episode as "a new book of Genesis for the Bible of the Evolutionists.

== Revivals and adaptations ==
In most productions the Don Juan in Hell sequence is omitted.

=== Britain ===
==== 1911 to 1938 ====
The first London revival after the runs at the Court was at the Criterion Theatre in 1911. Loraine again played Jack, and Pauline Chase was Ann. It ran for 167 performances. The first London production of the full play, including the Don Juan in Hell sequence, was given at the Regent Theatre in October 1925.

There were further revivals of the play at the Kingsway Theatre in 1927, the Court in 1930, the Kingsway in 1931 and the Cambridge Theatre in 1935. In all these revivals Esmé Percy played Jack opposite leading ladies including Gwen Ffrangcon-Davies and Rosalinde Fuller. The last pre-war London production was at the Old Vic in 1938. Lewis Casson directed, Anthony Quayle played Jack and Valerie Tudor played Ann.

==== 1951 to present ====
The first West End revival after the Second World War was at the New Theatre in 1951. It starred John Clements and Kay Hammond as the protagonists. A revival at the Prince's in the same year included Don Juan in Hell.

A production at the Arts Theatre in 1965 starred Alan Badel and Siân Phillips. The Royal Shakespeare Company staged the play in 1977, first at the Malvern Festival and then on tour, and finally at the Savoy Theatre in London. Richard Pasco played Jack and Susan Hampshire Ann. The National Theatre has twice staged the piece in full, including the Don Juan in Hell episode. In the first production (1981) Daniel Massey was Jack/Juan and Penelope Wilton Ann/Ana; in the second (2015) Ralph Fiennes was Jack/Juan and Indira Varma Ann/Ana. Between those productions Peter O'Toole starred in a 1982 production that toured and then played at the Haymarket Theatre in London.

=== Ireland ===
The Abbey Theatre presented three productions of the play, in 1917, 1925 and 1927. They were directed by J. Augustus Keogh, Michael J. Dolan and Lennox Robinson. In 2012 the Irish Repertory Theatre and Gingold Theatrical Group presented a revival directed and adapted by David Staller.

=== France ===
Les Archives du spectacle list two productions of Don Juan in Hell (Don Juan aux enfers), in a translation by André Maurois, but no productions of the main Man and Superman in France are recorded.

=== North America ===
The Internet Broadway Database lists five productions of the play. The first, in 1905, starred Loraine and Fay Davis and ran for 192 performances. A revival directed by and starring Maurice Evans ran for 295 performances in 1947–48. Don Juan in Hell was given an all‐star reading with considerable success in 1951 with Charles Boyer, Charles Laughton, Cedric Hardwicke, and Agnes Moorehead. The complete play was mounted by the Phoenix Theatre in 1964 with Ellis Rabb, Rosemary Harris and Nancy Marchand, and by the Circle in the Square in 1978 with George Grizzard, Ann Sachs, and Philip Bosco.

In 1982 David Wheeler directed a production at the Charles Playhouse in Boston, starring Richard Jordan and Diane Salinger. During rehearsals, the play was gradually whittled down to a three-hour length, but the "Don Juan in Hell" sequence survived intact. In 1990 South Coast Repertory in Costa Mesa, California staged a production, with the Don Juan in Hell act included, directed by Martin Benson and starring John de Lancie as Jack Tanner and his wife Marnie Mosiman as Ann Whitefield.

The Shaw Festival in Canada opened its first season (1962) with Don Juan in Hell and presented the main play in 1966 with Barry Morse and Pat Galloway as the protagonists. In two later festival productions, which included Don Juan in Hell, the leading roles were played by Ian Richardson and Carole Shelley (1977), and Michael Ball and Kate Trotter (1989). The festival again staged the work in 2004 with Ben Carlson and Fiona Blair as Tanner and Ann, and in 2019 with Gray Powell and Sara Topham.

=== Radio ===
In 1946, the BBC Third Programme broadcast the entire play over the wireless for the first time. The production was directed by Peter Watts. It starred John Garside, Leonard Sachs, Sebastian Shaw and Grizelda Hervey among others. A 1965 adaptation starred Robert Hardy as Tanner and Fenella Fielding as Ann.

In 1996, to celebrate BBC Radio 3's 50th Anniversary, Peter Hall directed an audio production with Ralph Fiennes as Jack Tanner, Judi Dench as Mrs Whitefield, John Wood as Mendoza, Juliet Stevenson as Ann Whitefield, Nicholas Le Prevost as Octavius Robinson and Jack Davenport as Hector Malone.

=== Television ===
A 1958 adaptation for television by Associated Television featured Basil Henson as Tanner and Ann Walford as Ann. BBC Television broadcast the play in 1968 with Eric Porter and Maggie Smith as the protagonists. In 1983 Harlech Television filmed and broadcast the Haymarket production with O'Toole in the lead.

== Awards and nominations ==
=== 1978 Broadway revival ===
Year	Award	Category	Nominee	Result
1979	Tony Award	Best Featured Actress in a Play	Laurie Kennedy	Nominated
1979	Drama Desk Award	Outstanding Featured Actor in a Play	Nicholas Woodeson	Nominated
1979	Drama Desk Award	Outstanding Featured Actress in a Play	Laurie Kennedy	Nominated
1979	Drama Desk Award	Outstanding Direction of a Play	Stephen Porter	Nominated
1979	Theatre World Award		Laurie Kennedy	Won

== Notes, references and sources ==
=== Sources ===
- Berst, Charles A. (1973). Bernard Shaw and the Art of Drama. Chicago: University of Illinois Press. ISBN 0-252-00258-X.
- Bertolini, John A. (1991). The Playwrighting Self of Bernard Shaw. Carbondale: Southern Illinois University Press. ISBN 0-8093-1650-1.
- Bridgwater, Patrick (1978). "English Writers and Nietzsche". In Malcolm Pasley (ed.). Nietzsche: Imagery and Thought: A Collection of Essays. Oakland: University of California Press. ISBN 978-0-520-03577-5.
- Gaye, Freda, ed. (1967). Who's Who in the Theatre (fourteenth ed.). London: Sir Isaac Pitman and Sons. OCLC 5997224.
- Grey, Thomas S. (2008). "The Gothic Libertine". In Lydia Goehr; Daniel Herwitz (eds.). The Don Giovanni Moment: Essays on the Legacy of an Opera. New York: Columbia University Press. ISBN 978-0231137553.
- Heller, Ágnes (2008). "Mozart's 'Don Giovanni' in Shaw's Comedy". In Lydia Goehr; Daniel Herwitz (eds.). The Don Giovanni Moment: Essays on the Legacy of an Opera. New York: Columbia University Press. ISBN 978-0231137553.
- Holroyd, Michael (1997). Bernard Shaw: The One-Volume Definitive Edition. London: Chatto & Windus. ISBN 978-0-7011-6279-5.
- Johnston, Denis; Jean German (2000). Shaw Festival Production Record, 1962–1999. Oakville: Mosaic Press. ISBN 0-88962-649-9.
- Loy, Myrna; James Kotsilibas-Davis (1987). Being and Becoming. New York: Knopf. ISBN 0-394-55593-7.
- Shaw, Bernard (1993). Dan H. Laurence; Daniel. J Leary (eds.). Bernard Shaw: The Complete Prefaces. London: Allen Lane: Penguin Press. ISBN 0-713-990562.
- Singh, Devendra Kumar (1994). The Idea of the Superman in the Plays of G. B. Shaw. New Delhi: Atlantic. ISBN 978-8-17-156390-6.
- Vogt, Sally (1987). "Ann and Superman: Type and Archetype". Modern Critical Views: George Bernard Shaw. New York: Chelsea House. ISBN 978-1-43-813550-2.
- Wearing, J. P. (1981). The London Stage, 1900–1909 A Calendar of Plays and Players. Metuchen: Scarecrow Press. ISBN 0-8108-1403-X.
- Wearing, J. P. (2013). The London Stage, 1910–1919 A Calendar of Plays and Players. Metuchen: Scarecrow Press. ISBN 978-0-8108-9300-9.
