= Azar (disambiguation) =

Azar (Persian: آذر) is the ninth month of the Solar Hijri calendar (used in Iran and Afghanistan).

Azar may refer to:

== Months ==
- Ādhār (Arabic: آذَار), or azar, an Arabic name of the calendar month of March
- Adar (Hebrew: אֲדָר), a month in the Hebrew calendar, roughly corresponding to March

== People ==
- Azar (name), a given name and surname, including a list of persons with the name

== Other uses ==
- Azar, Iran, or Azaran
- Azar Motor Industrial Co, an Iranian truck manufacturer

== See also ==
- Atar, the Zoroastrian concept of holy fire
- AzarAb Industries, a large Iranian manufacturer
- Azerbaijan (disambiguation)
- Visceral leishmaniasis, or kala-azar, a disease
