= Matt Walton =

American actor

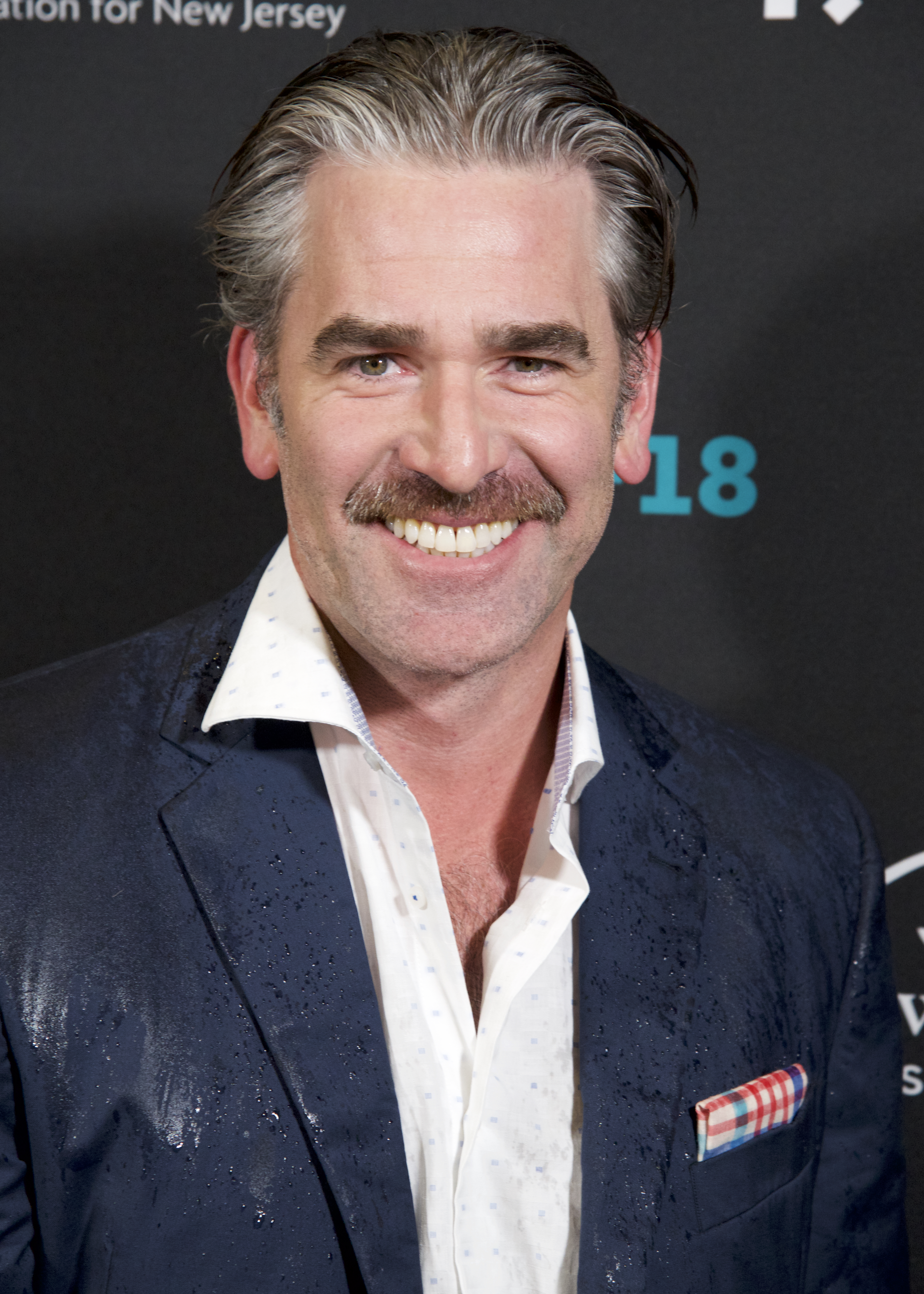
- Walton at the 2018 Montclair Film Festival
- Born: Hampton, New Jersey, U.S.
- Occupation: Actor
- Years active: 1997–present
- Spouse: Alecia Hurst
- Children: 2

Matthew "Matt" R. Walton is an American stage, film, and television actor. He is best known for his role as Elijah Clarke on One Life to Live.

== Early life ==
Walton was born in Hampton, New Jersey, and attended Boston Conservatory, where he received a degree as a Musical Theater major and a Directing minor. After graduation he returned to New York City and studied with Wynn Handman, Tony Spiridakis, Stephan Jobes and acting coaches Anthony Abeson, Seth Barrish and Bob Krakower.

== Career ==
=== Stage ===
Walton made his New York City debut Off-Broadway starring as Berger in the 30th anniversary production of Hair in 1997, and later reprised the role in Boston and at the Bay Street Theater in Sag Harbor, New York.

This performance in Hair led to roles in Off-Broadway premieres, including The Tailor Made Man, The Sweepers, We're All Dead, Rush's Dream, Gorilla Man, and The Framer.

He also played leads in New York and regional revivals of Beirut, Grease, Violet, Boy's Life, A Few Good Men, Proposals, Italian American Reconciliation, and Human Error.

He starred in the Off-Broadway production of Under My Skin, written by Robert Sternin and Prudence Fraser.

Parfumerie at The Wallis Annenberg Center in Beverly Hills.

It's Just Sex at the Actor's Temple in New York City.

Boeing-Boeing at the Paper Mill Playhouse in Milburn, New Jersey

=== Television and film ===
Walton's first television roles were on the soap operas Guiding Light, As the World Turns, and All My Children. Starting in 2009, he played Elijah Clarke on One Life to Live for 18 months.

Walton also played guest roles on Rescue Me, Royal Pains, Cashmere Mafia, The Bronx is Burning, and several episodes of Hallmark Hall of Fame.

Walton has appeared in over two dozen films, including Burn After Reading, Gigantic, and Armless.

Walton also played sportscaster Alex Reiser on the Comedy Central show Onion SportsDome, which premiered in January 2011.

=== Commercial and voice acting ===
Walton has acted in a number of ad campaigns, notably for Advil Cold and Sinus, Rooms to Go, Lowe's, Barclays, Speed Stick, Castrol, Old Navy and Optimum.

He has worked as a voice-over artist in over 100 TV and radio commercials, promos and narrations for The Biography Channel, A&E Network, Bravo, the Travel Channel, Independent Film Channel, and Oxygen. He has also done the narration for a number of audiobooks, including Spider-Man 2, Sinbad: Legend of the Seven Seas, and Second Chance.

=== Online ===
Walton is a regular at CollegeHumor and gained national attention in the "Gangnam Style" parody "Mitt Romney Style".

== Personal life ==
Walton is married to Alecia and has 2 children.

== Filmography ==
=== Film ===
Year	Title	Role	Notes
2003	200 American	Conrad	
2006	Flannel Pajamas	Dr. Butler	Uncredited
2007	Montclair	Matt	
2007	Holier than Thou	Miles	Short film
2007	The Agency	Mark Marley	TV movie
2008	Death in Love	Young Father	
2008	Burn After Reading	Morning Show Host	
2008	We Pedal Uphill	Anthony	
2008	Gigantic	Conner Williams	
2008	Moonlight and Mistletoe	Ben Richards	TV movie
2008	Favorite Son	Robert Mason	
2009	True North	Green	Short film
2009	Loving Leah	Carter	TV movie
2009	Sherri	Stu	
2010	Armless	Dr. Richard Phillips	
2010	Sim City Mayor	Mayor	CollegeHumor short film
2011	The Fall of Dyna-Woman	Dr. Robert Miller	Short film
2011	We Are the 1%	Dr. Robert Miller	CollegeHumor short film
2012	Mitt Romney Style	Mitt Romney	CollegeHumor short film
2012	Reunion	Paul	Short film
2014	Wish You Were	Officer Johnson	Short film
2014	Beach Pillows	City Dad	
2014	Charlie	Dr. Phillips	Short film
2014	The Sisterhood of Night	Reporter	
2014	Saint Janet	Scott	
2014	Hardbat	Jeff	Short film
2015	Born	Kyle	Short film
2015	Stuck	Jonathan	Short film
2015	Trouble	Larry Melman	
2015	Cry Baby Cry		Short film
2016	Money Monster	An Anchorman	
2016	The Purge: Election Year	Reporter #1	
2017	The Misogynists	Grant	
2018	The Downside	Larry Melman	Short film
2018	How to Train Your Husband or (How to Pick Your Second Husband First)	Jack	
2019	The Irishman	TV Host	
2021	Pretenders	Hannah's Dad	Executive producer
2021	Next Stop, Christmas	George Reynolds	TV movie
2022	Heaven, I Suppose	Doctor	Short film
2023	No Hard Feelings	Irate Bar Customer	
2023	Herd	Governor Diraldi	Co-producer
2023	The Luckiest Man Alive	Bobby	Short film
2024	Marvin Is Sorry	Tag Taggart	Short film
2025	The Housemaid	Lynch	
2026	Seniors	Pete	Short film
2026	Our Lives After	Sid	Short film

=== Television ===
Year	Title	Role	Notes
2005	Law & Order: Special Victims Unit	Jack	Episode: "Starved"
2006	All My Children	Terry 'T' McDermott	6 episodes
2007	The Bronx Is Burning	Jim McMullen	2 episodes
2008	Cashmere Mafia	Mike	Episode: "Conference Call"
2008	Law & Order: Criminal Intent	Det. Peary	Episode: "Please Note We Are No Longer Accepting Letters of Recommendation from Henry Kissinger"
2008	Guiding Light	Dalton Reid	2 episodes
2008	Law & Order	Trooper Thomas Volchek	Episode: "Knock Off"
2009	Rescue Me	Harris	Episode: "Perspective"
2009-2010	One Life to Live	Elijah Clark/Elijah Kent	138 episodes
2010	Royal Pains	Dennis "DB" Brown	Episode: "Mano a Mano"
2011	Onion SportsDome	Alex Reiser	Series regular 10 episodes
2011	Jake and Amir	CollegeHumor CEO Alan Avery	Episode: "Jake and Amir: Fired"
2012	Blue Bloods	Kevin Schmidt	Episode: "The Uniform"
2012	Jest Originals	Mitt Romney	2 episodes
2012	Made in Jersey	Stiles	Episode: "Payday"
2013	Think Tank	Brimage	5 episodes
2014	Drop Dead Diva	Breakers' Attorney	Episode: "Cheers & Jeers"
2014	Person of Interest	Maybank	Episode: "Beta"
2014	The Mysteries of Laura	Reporter Store	Episode: "The Mystery of the Sex Scandal"
2015	Devious Maids	Mr. Atwood	Episode: "Cries and Whispers"
2015	Limitless	Jeffrey Vachs	Episode: "The Legend of Marcos Ramos"
2016	Youthful Daze	Drew's Dad, Luke Castle	78 episodes
2016	The Good Wife	Ian Gillan	Episode: "Targets"
2016	Notorious	Darin Mills	6 episodes
2017	The Blacklist: Redemption	Gable Lang	Episode: "Hostages"
2017	Mindhunter	Anchorman	Episode: "Ear to Ear"
2018	The Resident	Spalding Massero	Episode: "The Elopement"
2018	Instinct	Dr. Damian Grant	Episode: "Heartless"
2018	The Affair	Police Officer	Episode 2
2018	FBI	Carter Pope	Episode: "Pilot"
2019	American Soul	Dick Clark	2 episodes
2019	Madam Secretary	Shawn Olson	Episode: "Deepfake"
2019-2020	Tell Me a Story	Clay Callaway	3 episodes
2021	Younger	New Day USA Co-Host	Episode: "It's the End of the World, Worm Girl"
2021	Halston	Jeff Watkin	Episode: "The Sweet Smell of Success"
2021	Wu-Tang: An American Saga	Dominick Olivito	Episode: "Little Ghetto Boys"
2021	The Last O.G.	Hunter	Episode: "The Negotiator"
2022	Chicago Fire	Alan Cutler	Episode: "Finish What You Started"
2022	The Blacklist	Spencer Waters	Episode: "The Whaler (No. 165)"
2024	FBI: Most Wanted	Mr. Haggarty	Episode: "Varsity Blues"

=== Video games ===
Year	Title	Role
2002	Asheron's Call 2	
2003	Max Payne 2: The Fall of Max Payne	Policeman, Cleaner, Commando
2003	Manhunt	Swat 2
2007	Manhunt 2	The Watchdogs member
2008	Grand Theft Auto IV	The Crowd of Liberty City
2018	Red Dead Redemption 2	Albert Mason
