= Laurie Kennedy =

American actress (born 1948)

- Born: February 14, 1945 (age 81); Manhattan, New York, U.S.
- Education: Solebury School; Sarah Lawrence College
- Occupation: Actress
- Spouse: D. Keith Mano
- Children: 2
- Parent: Arthur Kennedy

Laurie Ewing Kennedy (born February 14, 1945) is an American stage, screen and television actress. She is the daughter of actor Arthur Kennedy.

== Early years and career ==
Kennedy was born in Hollywood, California, in February 1945, (Note: Whereas Internet Broadway Database lists 1948 as her birth year (and February 14 as the specific day), and the 1990 work, The World Who's Who of Women, has "14 Feb 1949", a 1945 piece by entertainment writer Marjory Adams, published in response to a reader's Arthur Kennedy query, offers both the actor's date of birth—February 17, 1914—and those of both his son, Terence (February 14, 1943), and daughter, Laurie, here listed as February 13, 1945. Moreover, at least four different articles published between the years of 1949 and 1962 include the name and current age of each of Arthur Kennedy's two children, each and every one of then consistent with the respective birth years—1943 and 1945—cited by Adams. Indeed, the last of these—a profile/interview conducted in August 1962 during a brief Ireland getaway with wife and daughter—not only specifically cites his then "17-year-old daughter Laurie [and] 19-year-old Terry" but contains a photograph of the former, clearly depicting someone then better able to pass for 20-something than 14.) the daughter of actor Arthur Kennedy and stage actress Mary Cheffey. In 1953, her parents purchased a home in Westport, Connecticut. and thus Kennedy spent the bulk of her formative years in the Northeastern United States. It was while attending Solebury School in Pennsylvania that Kennedy first realized that she was meant to be an actor. After her freshman year at Sarah Lawrence College, Kennedy apprenticed under Nikos Psacharopoulos at the Williamstown Theatre Festival, where she gave what would prove but the first of several performances as Irina, the youngest of Chekhov's Three Sisters (a role Kennedy would reprise twice at Williamstown and once at Los Angeles Music Center's Mark Taper Forum.

In 1979, for her performance as Violet Robinson in Shaw's Man and Superman, Kennedy received the Derwent Award, the Theatre World Award, and a Best Featured Actress Tony nomination.

On screen, Kennedy portrayed Pat Lawford in the 1983 miniseries, Kennedy.

== Personal life ==
From 1980 until his death in 2016, Kennedy was married to writer D. Keith Mano.

== Filmography ==
- The Wedding Party (1969) – Wedding Guest
- The Edge of Night
  - Unknown episodes (1972) – Dr. Phoebe Smith Jamieson #3
- Harry O
  - Ep. "Anatomy of a Frame" (1975) – Libby Weld
- Police Woman
  - Ep. Mother Love (1976) – Anne Magruder
- Emergency!
  - Ep. "The Game" (1976) – Paramedic Coordinator (uncredited)
  - Ep. "Paper Work" (1977) – Nurse Patterson
- Diary of the Dead (1976) – Ellie
- Standing Room Only
  - Ep. "Sherlock Holmes" (1981) – Alice Faulkner
- St. Elsewhere
  - Ep. "Baron Von Munchausen" (1983) – Nan
- Kennedy
  - 5 episodes (1983) – Pat Lawford
- Twisted (1985) – Peg Yaeger
- Choices (1986) – Ellen
- As the World Turns
  - Ep. dated October 12, 1987 (1987) – Liz Evans
- Monsters (1989)
  - Ep. "Portrait of the Artist" – Lucille Clay
- Law and Order
  - Ep. "Life Is Choice" (1991) – Barbara Donovan
  - Ep. "Mad Dog" (1997) – Trial Judge Edna Shields
  - Ep. "Cherished" (1998) – Trial Judge Bonnie Shields
  - Ep. "Missing" (2002) – Trial Judge Shields
- The Perfect Tribute (1991) – Mrs. Blair
- Swans Crossing
  - Unknown episodes (1992) – Cornelia Booth
- Homicide: Life on the Street
  - Ep. "A Model Citizen" – Felicity Weaver
  - Ep. "Scene of the Crime" – Felicity Weaver
  - Ep. "Pit Bull Sessions" – Felicity Weaver
  - Ep. "Secrets" – Felicity Weaver
- Path to Paradise: The Untold Story of the World Trade Center Bombing (1997) – FBI Receptionist
- The Love Letter (1998) – Lavinia Whitcomb
- Third Watch
  - Ep. "The Long Guns" (2002) – Sonia
- Oz
  - Ep. "Sonata da Oz" (2003) – Sanford
- Law and Order: Criminal Intent
  - Ep. "Blink" (2003) – Professor Eileen Kray
- Winter Passing (2005) – Nun
- The Bedford Diaries
  - Ep. "The Passion of the Beaver" (2006)
- Iris (2009) – Iris
- Armless (2010) – Marie
- Law and Order: Special Victims Unit
  - Ep. "Valentine's Day" (2012) – Mrs. Hartwell
- Madam Secretary
  - Ep. "You Say You Want a Revolution" (2015) – Mrs. Burke
- Crashing
  - Ep. "Julie" (2017)
- City on a Hill
  - Ep. "Boston Bridges, Falling Down" (2022) – Molly Murphy
  - Ep. Whipping Post (2022) – Molly Murphy
