= George Azar =

American photographer

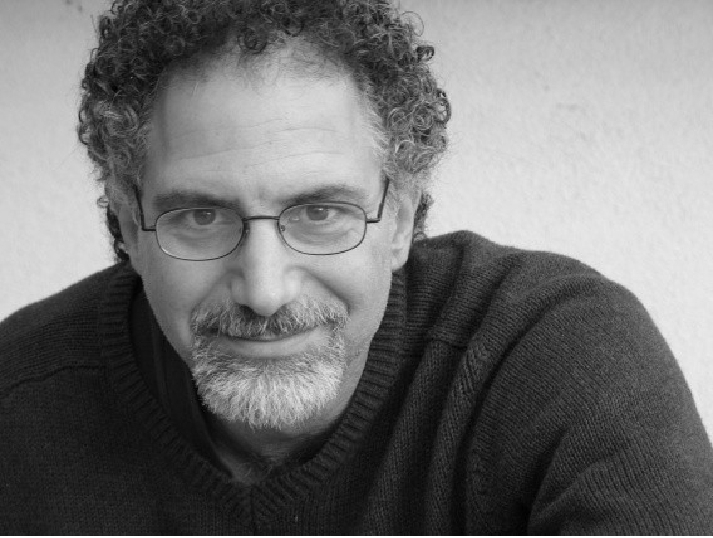
- George Azar
- Born: February 3, 1959 (age 67); Philadelphia, United States
- Occupations: Photographer, Documentary Filmmaker

George Azar (born February 3, 1959) is a Lebanese-American photojournalist and documentary filmmaker. His photographs have appeared on the front pages of The New York Times, the International Herald Tribune, The Economist, Saudi Aramco World and other leading publications. Since 2006 he and Mariam Shahin, have produced over 50 films for the international satellite news network, Al Jazeera. Azar has also produced several documentaries for the internet news channel Vice News, including "Crime and Punishment in Gaza", "Renegade Jewish Settlers" and 'The Islamic State vs Lebanon". Azar has covered the Middle East and Arab/Islamic culture since 1981 and is the subject of the CBS Emmy Award-winning news feature, Beirut Photographer. He was also profiled in the BBC's Firing Line. He was nominated for the 2007 Rory Peck Award for his film Gaza Fixer. His and fellow filmmaker Tom Evans' film Two Schools in Nablus also received great acclaim, winning the Japan Prize in Education in 2008, and the British Royal Television Society Education Award in 2009. In addition, Azar is the author and photographer of the critically acclaimed book Palestine: A Photographic Journey, and the photographer of Palestine: A Guide, written by Mariam Shahin.

In addition to his work as a photojournalist and filmmaker, Azar is a historian and curator. His writing, photography and photo curation is on permanent display on the first three floors of San Francisco's historic U.S. Customhouse, and New York's International Center of Photography hosted Azar's 2002 curation of Bill Biggart's "Twin Towers", which marked the one-year anniversary of the tragedy. Azar commands unique insight into both the Arab world and the western perceptions and misperceptions of it, and has lectured on the subject at major universities including the University of California, Berkeley, the University of Chicago, Stanford, Vanderbilt, Pepperdine and Harvard. Azar is currently a Photojournalist in Residence and a full-time instructor in Journalism and Digital Media at the American University of Beirut since Fall 2018–19.

== Early life ==
Azar was born in Philadelphia on February 3, 1959, the middle child of George Azar Jr. and Gladys Saddic, both the children of Lebanese immigrants. He has three siblings, an older sister, Madelynn, and two younger brothers, Michael and Habib. When he was eight years old, the family relocated to San Diego, California, where he spent the remainder of his childhood.

Between 1977 and 1981, Azar attended the University of California, Santa Barbara and the University of California, Berkeley, where he received a Bachelor of Arts in political science, history. He graduated magna cum laude.

Having grown up in a Lebanese American household, and visiting Lebanon several times throughout his youth, Azar was always extremely interested in the Middle East. In the introduction to his book, Palestine: A Photographic Journey, Azar writes:

"My grandfather, 'Jiddu' Haleem, often spoke of a place where by custom, a hungry traveler could pick fruit from orchards, where snowy mountaintops overlooked the Mediterranean, and where villages with red-tiled roofs nestled in forests of cedar and pine. He called that country biladi, my homeland...the Arab world came alive for me through those stories."

Then in July 1981, the Israeli Air Force bombed a neighborhood in Beirut called Fakhani, sending stacks of 700 pound bombs slamming into densely packed apartment buildings. Some 400 civilians were killed by the explosions or crushed by the weight of the fallen buildings. Azar read about it in a newspaper, clipped the short article, and taped it onto the refrigerator door so his friends could see it. Throughout the summer he would look at this article and become overwhelmed. This Israeli bombing campaign in West Beirut was part of the early stages of what would eventually transform into the 1982 Lebanon War. Azar writes, "I could imagine the press coverage that would have followed if 400 Jewish civilians been killed in a Palestinian attack. Yet, in 1981, the killing of 400 Arab civilians by Israel hardly caused a ripple in the American public mind."

By the end of the summer, shocked and troubled, Azar decided to see, first-hand, the conflict he had read about in newspapers. So, in September 1981, he departed for Beirut with his friend and college roommate, Michael Nelson. They hitchhiked across Europe to Lebanon, with the goal of pursuing careers in photojournalism. They finally arrived in Beirut in November 1981. And it was there and then that Azar's career began.

== Career ==
Once in Beirut, Azar became a news photographer, covering the Lebanese War as a stringer for the Associated Press (AP), United Press International (UPI) and later for the French photo agency, Gamma. From 1981 to 1989 Azar chronicled the Israeli invasion of Lebanon, the destruction of the U.S. Marine compound, the civil insurrection in West Beirut, the vicious inter-factional war among the Palestinians in North Lebanon, The Druze-Maronite war in the Chouf mountains and the Syrian siege of Mount Lebanon.

During the early days of the Israeli invasion of Lebanon in June 1982, Azar was trapped under an intense bombardment, abandoned by his driver in a small town on the Lebanese coast, called Jieh. He was covering the war for Newsweek. When the Israelis overran the town there was a brief, but intense fight. Jieh was left in ruins.

Azar was taken by the Israeli army, and marched to the outskirts of Damour. Because he held press credentials and U.S. citizenship he was not blindfolded, handcuffed and beaten, as were the other Arab men he saw. He was kept with a group of paratroopers in a large house overlooking the ocean, which, unknown to them, was owned by former Lebanese president Camille Chamoun.

After three days he was taken to the local Israeli command center where he was interrogated. His cameras and pockets were emptied and his film destroyed. Upon the insistence of an Israeli photographer, Shalomo Arad, who was serving in the IDF (Israel Defense Forces) he was put on a military helicopter and flown out of the war zone to Israel. Azar wrote about the experience:

"Peering from the helicopter window, I felt, in a strange way like Elijah in his flaming chariot, flying among the clouds above the Holy Land. Looking down I could see funnel clouds of black smoke billowing from a hundred different points along the Lebanese countryside. Houses lay smashed by artillery fire. Burned out cars and taxis, strafed by fighter-bombers were strewn upside down, or lying in bomb craters along the coast highway. Lebanon burned below. Armored columns of tanks snaked northward from Israel, laying waste to the land."

Azar was taken to the Newsweek office in Jerusalem, where he handed over two rolls of color film he had taken of the Israeli assault on Jieh, and hidden from the Israelis in his underwear. On the rolls were photographs of terrified Palestinian refugees trapped in a building as it was being shelled, and Israeli battle-tanks leveling Lebanese houses at point-blank range. When the magazine appeared the following week it carried two of Azar's photographs. One was of two Lebanese militiamen firing a machine-gun at Israeli jets, and the other of a PLO guerrilla walking past a destroyed building. The photographs of the Israeli assault on Jieh were never seen again. Newsweek claims they were lost.

After delivering his film to Newsweek, Azar was free to go on his way. But before returning to Beirut, he traveled to the Palestinian Occupied Territories. Azar was horrified by the devastation he saw. And so began a fascination with Palestine and a desire to document and report the plight of the Palestinian people; a desire that would shape and dominate his career in the following years.

When the First Intifada erupted in Palestine in the winter of 1987, Azar was living in the United States, working as a photographer for The Philadelphia Inquirer. He had left the horror of Beirut, Damour and Tripoli behind almost two years before and resisted the thought of ever going back. But as he watched images on the news of the people of the villages, refugee camps and towns of Palestine taking to the streets, protected by nothing save the cloth of their keffiyehs, and armed with stones, he finally decided to return to Palestine. The photos he took during that stay in Palestine would become his first book, the critically acclaimed Palestine: A Photographic Journey, published in 1991.

In December 2012, Al Jazeera English flagship documentary series "Witness" aired "Beirut Photographer" Directed by George Azar and Mariam Shahin. The film is about Azar's return to Beirut 30 years after his first visit and documents his journey to the past and how he finds and reconnects to many of the people he photographed in 1982.

== Production ==
=== Documentaries for Al Jazeera ===
==== 2012 ====
- Beirut Photographer (48 min documentary)
- Fall Out In The Mediterranean (44 min documentary)

==== 2011 ====
- Free Running Gaza on YouTube (25 min documentary)

==== 2010 ====
- Looting the Holy Land on YouTube (47 min documentary)

==== 2009 ====
- The Cost of War on YouTube (22 min documentary)
- Gaza Fixer 2 on YouTube (22 min documentary)
- Locked in: Life in Gaza on YouTube (22 min documentary)
- Timbuktu scribes on YouTube (22 min documentary)

==== 2008 ====
- Desert Blues on YouTube (22 min documentary)
- Cheating To Live on YouTube (22 min documentary)
- Lost Manuscripts of Timbuktu (22 min documentary)
- Abduallah Goes to Essekane (22 min documentary)
- On War with Josh Rushing (22 min documentary)

==== 2007 ====
- Crossroads Europe: Islam in Berlin (22 min documentary)
- Iraq: The Way Out? (22 min film)
- Hostages of Gaza (22 min documentary)
- Seen But Not Heard (6 min documentary)
- Samaritan Brides (6 min documentary)
- The Get (6 min documentary)
- Hostages to Fortune on YouTube (44 min documentary)
- Cheating to Live (22 min documentary)
- Hope on Hold (3 x 22 min documentary series)
- Two Schools in Nablus (3 x 22 min documentary series made with filmmaker Tom Evans) - Winner of 2008 Japan Prize in Education & 2009 Royal Television Society Education Award

==== 2006 ====
- In Exile Next Door (22 min documentary)
- No One Left Behind (22 min documentary)
- Hollywood: Casting the Enemy (22 min documentary)
- Bargaining Chips (22 min documentary)
- Gaza Fixer on YouTube (22 min documentary) - Winner of 2007 Rory Peck Award

=== Published photographs ===
==== 2000s ====
- 2007 - Gaza Strip & West Bank, New York Times, Boston Globe
- 2006 - Gaza Strip & West Bank, New York Times, Boston Globe
- 2005 - Palestinian Presidential Elections, New York Times
- 2005 - Palestine: A Guide, Interlink books
- 2004 - ‘This Is Palestine’, Educational CD-Rom, United Nations Development Programme
- 2004 - Death of Arafat, The Guardian
- 2003 - Palestine Photographic Survey, United Nations Development Programme
- 2002 - World Trade Center Martyr Bill Biggart, International Center for Photography

==== 1990s ====
- 1998-2001 - World Featherweight Boxing Champion, Prince Naseem
- 1997 - Dick Dale, King of the Surf Guitar, Aramco World Magazine
- 1996 - Nader Khalili's Earth Architecture, Fine Homebuilding
- 1995 - Syrian Archeology, Aramco World Magazine
- 1994 - Hardwood Craftsman Sam Maloof, Aramco World Magazine
- 1994 - Naturalist Gary Paul Nabhan, Aramco World Magazine
- 1993 - Beirut, Up From the Ashes, Aramco World Magazine
- 1993 - Lebanese Archeology, Aramco World Magazine
- 1992 - Master Dancer Elie Chaib, Aramco World Magazine
- 1992 - Hanan Ashrawi & The Washington Peace Talks, Mother Ines
- 1992 - Iraq After Desert Storm, San Francisco Bay Guardian
- 1991 - Iraq War, San Jose Mercury News

==== 1980s ====
- 1989 - The Syrian Siege of Mt. Lebanon, Philadelphia Inquirer
- 1988 - The Palestinian Uprising, University of California Press
- 1987 - The Grateful Dead, Philadelphia Inquirer
- 1987 - Philadelphia Prizefighters, Philadelphia Magazine
- 1985 - The Iran-Iraq War, Battle of Basra, U.S. News & World Report
- 1985 - East Beirut & Mt. Lebanon, Philadelphia Inquirer
- 1984 - Insurrection in West Beirut, Newsweek
- 1984 - A Sniper's Story, Beirut, Philadelphia Inquirer
- 1983 - Bombing of the U.S. Marine Compound Beirut, UPI
- 1983 - War of the Camps, Northern Lebanon, Newsweek
- 1982 - The Israeli Invasion of Lebanon, Newsweek
- 1981 - The Lebanese Civil War, AP

=== Books ===
- Azar, George, Palestine, A Photographic Journey, Berkeley, CA: University of California Press, 1991. ISBN 9780520073845
- Mariam Shahin & George Azar, Palestine, A Guide, Northampton, MA: Interlink Books, 2005. ISBN 1905214510 - finalist for the Independent Publisher Book Award 2006, received an Honorable Mention for ForeWord Magazine's Book of the Year Awards, and was The Independent's "Pick of the Picture Books Award".
