= A Very Merry Unauthorized Children's Scientology Pageant =

Satirical musical about Scientology

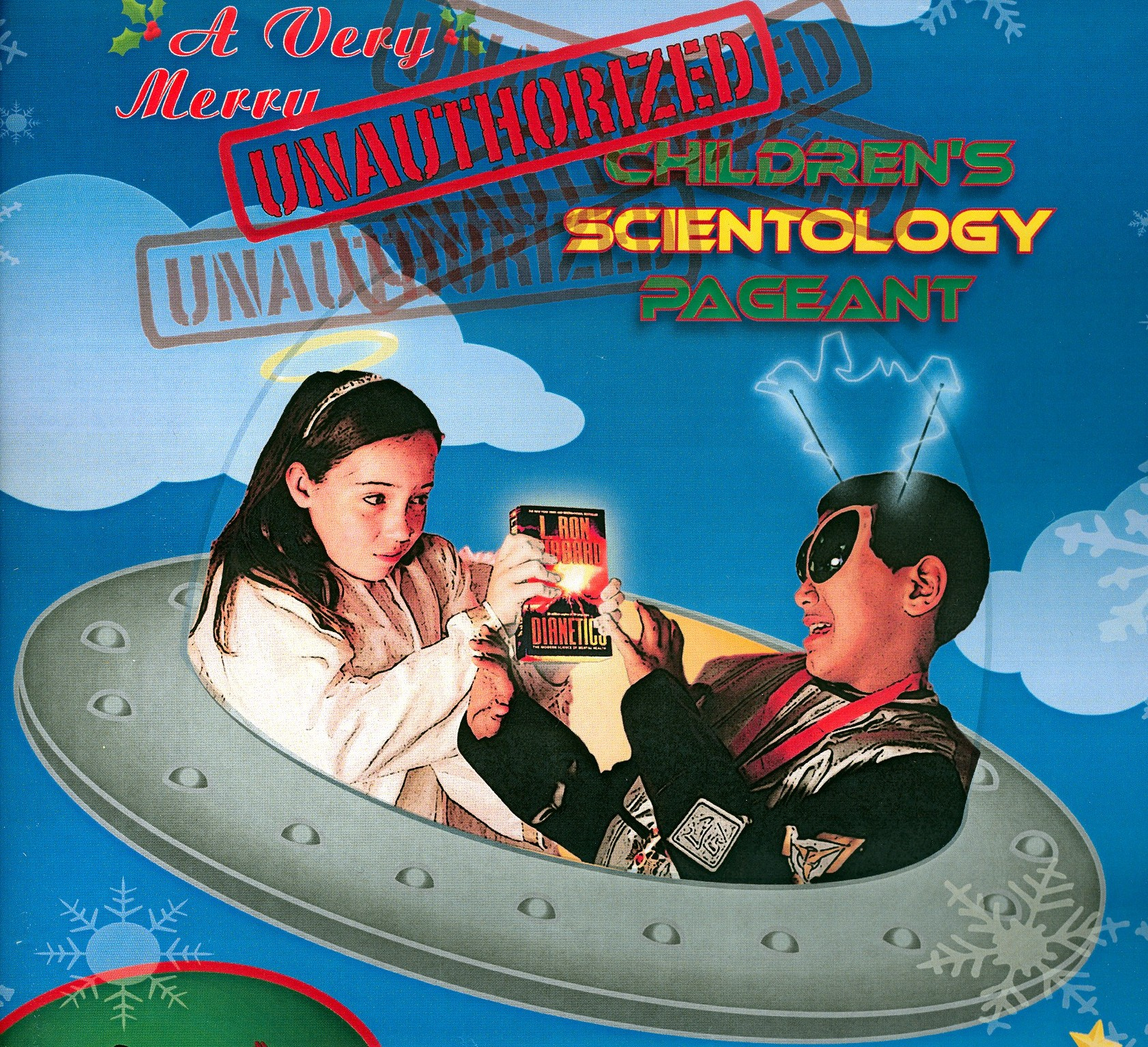
- Poster from 2007 Philadelphia production
- Music: Kyle Jarrow
- Lyrics: Kyle Jarrow
- Book: Kyle Jarrow
- Basis: A concept by Alex Timbers
- Productions: 2003 – Off-Off-Broadway, Off-Broadway; 2004 – Los Angeles; 2006 – New York, Boston, Atlanta; 2007 – Philadelphia, Atlanta, Washington, D.C. 2008 – Syracuse, Fort Worth, Cincinnati, Chicago, Phoenix, 2022 – Off-Broadway
- Awards: 2004 Obie Award

A Very Merry Unauthorized Children's Scientology Pageant is a satirical musical about Scientology and L. Ron Hubbard, written by Kyle Jarrow from a concept by Alex Timbers, the show's original director. Jarrow based the story of the one-act, one-hour musical on Hubbard's writings and Church of Scientology literature. The musical follows the life of Hubbard as he develops Dianetics and then Scientology. Though the musical pokes fun at Hubbard's science fiction writing and personal beliefs, it has been called a "deadpan presentation" of his life story. Topics explored in the piece include Dianetics, the E-meter, Thetans, and the story of Xenu. The show was originally presented in 2003 in New York City by Les Freres Corbusier, an experimental theater troupe, enjoying sold-out Off-Off-Broadway and Off-Broadway productions. Later productions have included Los Angeles, New York, Boston, Atlanta, Philadelphia, and Washington, D.C.

Early in the production of the musical, the president of the Church of Scientology in New York sent a letter to the producer pointing out the Church's history of litigation. This led Timbers and Jarrow to insert the word Unauthorized into the title, upon the advice of legal counsel. During the Los Angeles production, representatives of the Church of Scientology visited the production staff in the midst of rehearsals and handed out documentation of successful litigation against critics of Scientology. Parents of some of the Los Angeles cast members also received phone calls from Scientologists in the entertainment industry, asking them not to allow their children to perform in the musical.

A Very Merry Unauthorized Children's Scientology Pageant has been well received. The 2003 New York production received an Obie Award, and director Alex Timbers received a Garland Award for the 2004 Los Angeles production. The musical also received positive reviews in the press. The New York Times characterized it as a "cult-hit", and The Village Voice, the Los Angeles Times and The Guardian all gave it favorable reviews. Variety and The Boston Globe had kind words for the updated 2006 edition. A 2004 cast recording released by Sh-K-Boom Records received four out of five stars from Allmusic and plaudits from The Los Angeles Daily News.

== Background ==
Alex Timbers developed the concept and directed the play, while Kyle Jarrow wrote the accompanying book, music, and lyrics. Timbers and Jarrow were classmates together at Yale University. The script for the play is published by Samuel French, Inc. Jarrow was motivated to write the script by what he saw as a shift in religious teachings – from an old model involving hell and retribution, to a new system of thought promising money or peace. Jarrow commented on Timbers' idea of using children to tell a story about Scientology: "I did a lot of work on cults in college, and what I learned is that they sort of turn you into a child by appealing to that part of you that wants to be taken care of and given answers. And so it all began to make sense to me." He said Scientology would be "an especially interesting topic for a theater piece" because of its criticism of psychiatry, relative newness compared to Buddhism, Islam, Judaism, and Christianity, and practice of requiring "that the follower take courses which cost significant amounts of money."

Jarrow's script was "almost entirely based on Hubbard's own writings and the church's literature", though Jarrow was also influenced by critical journalistic accounts. He also drew on the "awkward woodenness of Christmas pageants — the fact that children are often made to say large words that don't sound natural coming out of their mouths." Timbers said they chose to stick to Church of Scientology primary source material for background on the script because "We thought that the best way to satirize the Church of Scientology was to let the Church speak for itself." During production, the creative team worked with cast members to educate them about the play's background. "Kids shouldn't just be saying things that they don't understand. That's what we're criticizing ... people who just parrot behavior and language. We wanted to have an honest conversation with them", Jarrow said. The published version of the script says that the musical should not be performed by adults; Jarrow said adults are "too jaded", and would not be able to portray the "unwinking satire" of the piece.

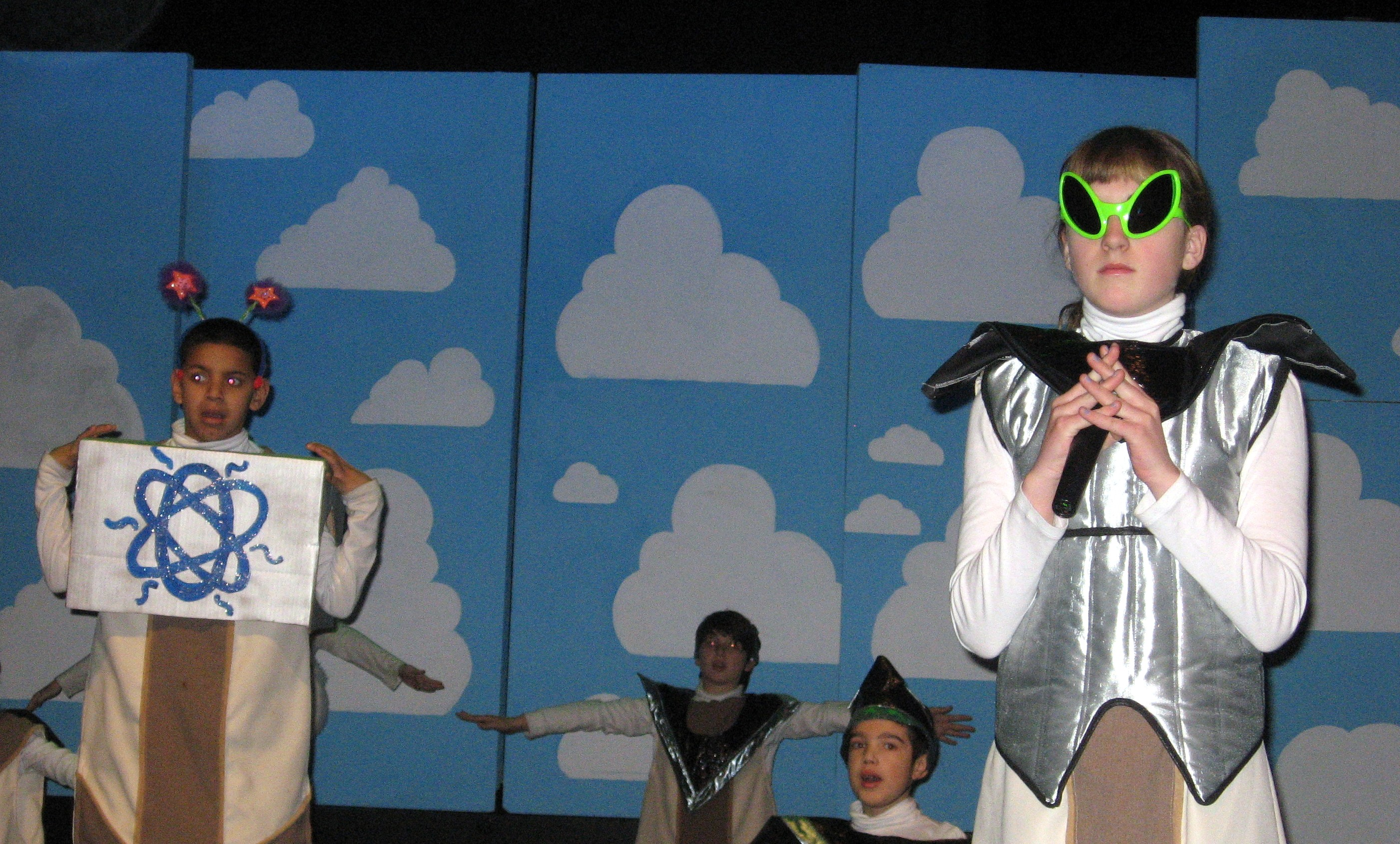
Xenu scene, 2007 Philadelphia production

The producers wanted the musical to appear like a "corny and low-rent production". The ensemble includes 10 actors from ages eight to twelve. Though professionals, the child actors perform with a "realistic lack of polish", as they are playing non-professional children of Scientologists, performing in a holiday pageant. The chorus portrays Thetans, and the reactive and analytical portions of the mind are depicted by two children who share a conjoined right brain costume. During the Xenu story, the narrator is outfitted in a cardboard robot suit, and the actor portraying Xenu wears a "tacky headdress". Staging, costumes and set design are all made to appear to be the "earnest work of schoolteachers and supportive parents trying to provide a colorful and cheery atmosphere on a small budget." The stage design includes a "colorful, crayon-colored backdrop of space age-like, semi-circular set pieces." Costumes include white robes, rainbow-striped socks and tinsel halos. Props used to denote locations include "a waving cardboard palm frond for Hawaii, a street sign and cell phones for New York." The musical ends with a tableau vivant, where the audience sees the cast standing at the back of the theater holding candles and singing cheerfully as a door closes and they are blocked from view.

Early in the production of the play, John Carmichael, president of the Church of Scientology in New York, found out that a theatrical production involving Scientology was in the works. After showing up unannounced to a rehearsal, Carmichael sent a letter to the play's New York producer, Aaron Lemon-Strauss, citing his concerns at the possibility of being ridiculed. In the letter, Carmichael also pointed out the church's many past lawsuits. Alex Timbers was quoted as saying: "We've been told that the letter is a precursor to a lawsuit." Carmichael visited the artistic staff a total of three times to voice his concerns before the play's debut. After this occurrence, Jarrow and Timbers' attorneys advised them to insert the word Unauthorized into the title of the play. This was done to avoid potential litigation from the Church of Scientology. In an interview with The New York Times, Carmichael later stated: "These folks have a right to write whatever play they want ... but they've sunk to clichés."

== Plot summary ==
The characters gather on a cold winter night to rejoice in telling the story of L. Ron Hubbard. "Hey! It's a Happy Day!" A narrator notes: "Today we relate the life of L. Ron Hubbard: Teacher, author, explorer, atomic physicist, nautical engineer, choreographer, horticulturist, and father of Scientology!" Hubbard is born in a nativity scene, surrounded by parents and barnyard animals, as an angel proclaims, "Billions of years of evolution had climaxed with his birth." He begins to question the nature of his existence. He is adrift on a boat in the Pacific Ocean during his service in World War II, when he begins to think about starting a religion. Hubbard tells his followers about what he has learned through his travels in "Science of the Mind", singing about "the key to being free, the way to be happy". He tells his followers that during the war "I saw how emotion can make you blind", and he begins to teach his followers about the reactive mind.

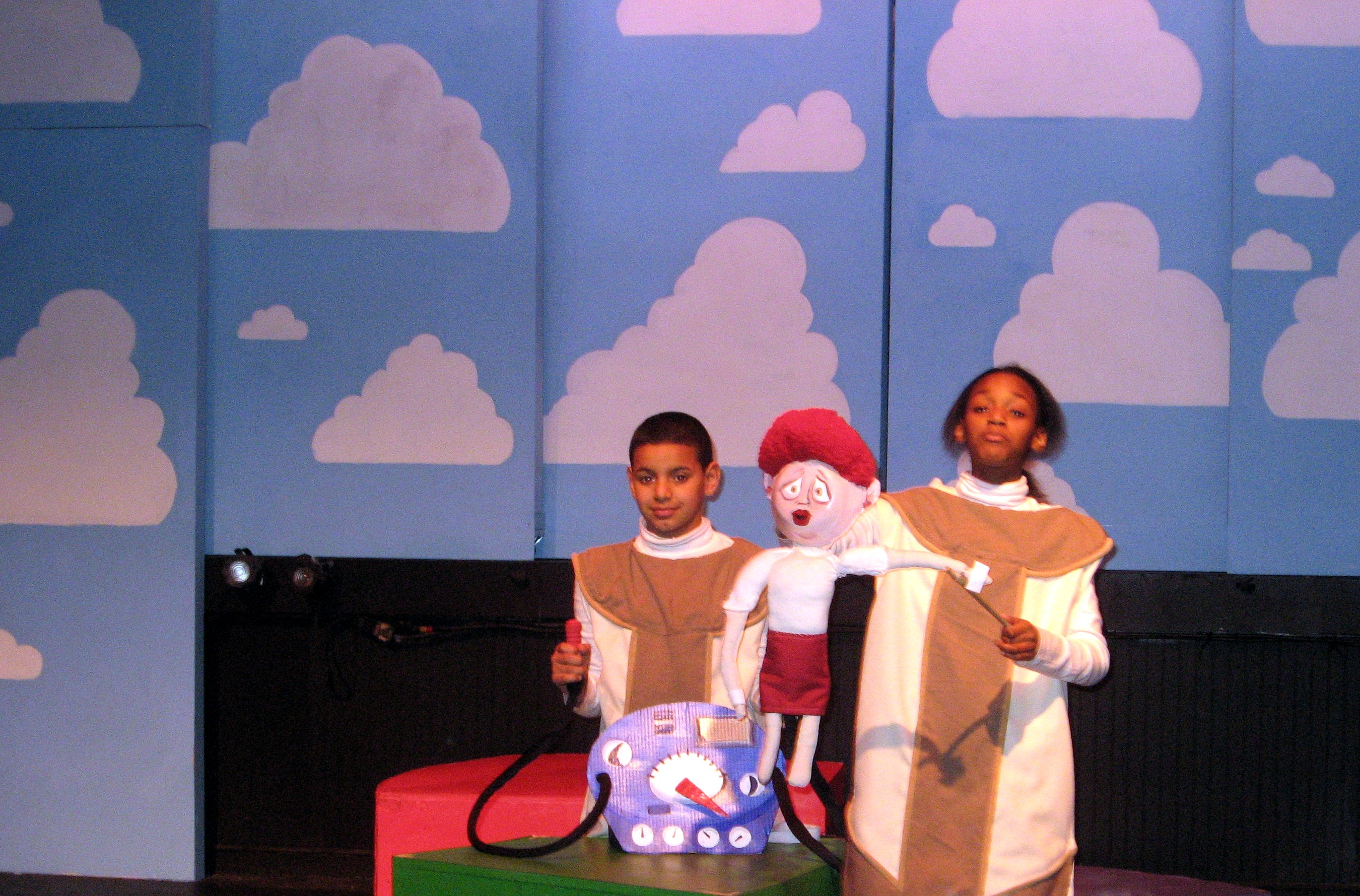
The E-meter, as described in a puppet show, 2007 Philadelphia production

Hubbard thanks the analytical mind (portrayed by two characters) for helping him to find the answers he was searching for, and proclaims: "Thinking rationally is the way to be happy and the key to learning more." He announces to his followers, "You'll operate with your analytical mind only. ... There won't be any emotions to stand in the way of your success." As Hubbard tells his followers about his new ideas, they each proclaim to him: "You're right!" Hubbard answers: "Of course I'm right!" Hubbard's followers thank him for teaching them his new ideas: "Now the sun will shine / And the world is fine / We have got the science of the mind." A Church of Scientology auditor explains some technical Scientology jargon to new recruits, and the E-meter is described in a puppet show.

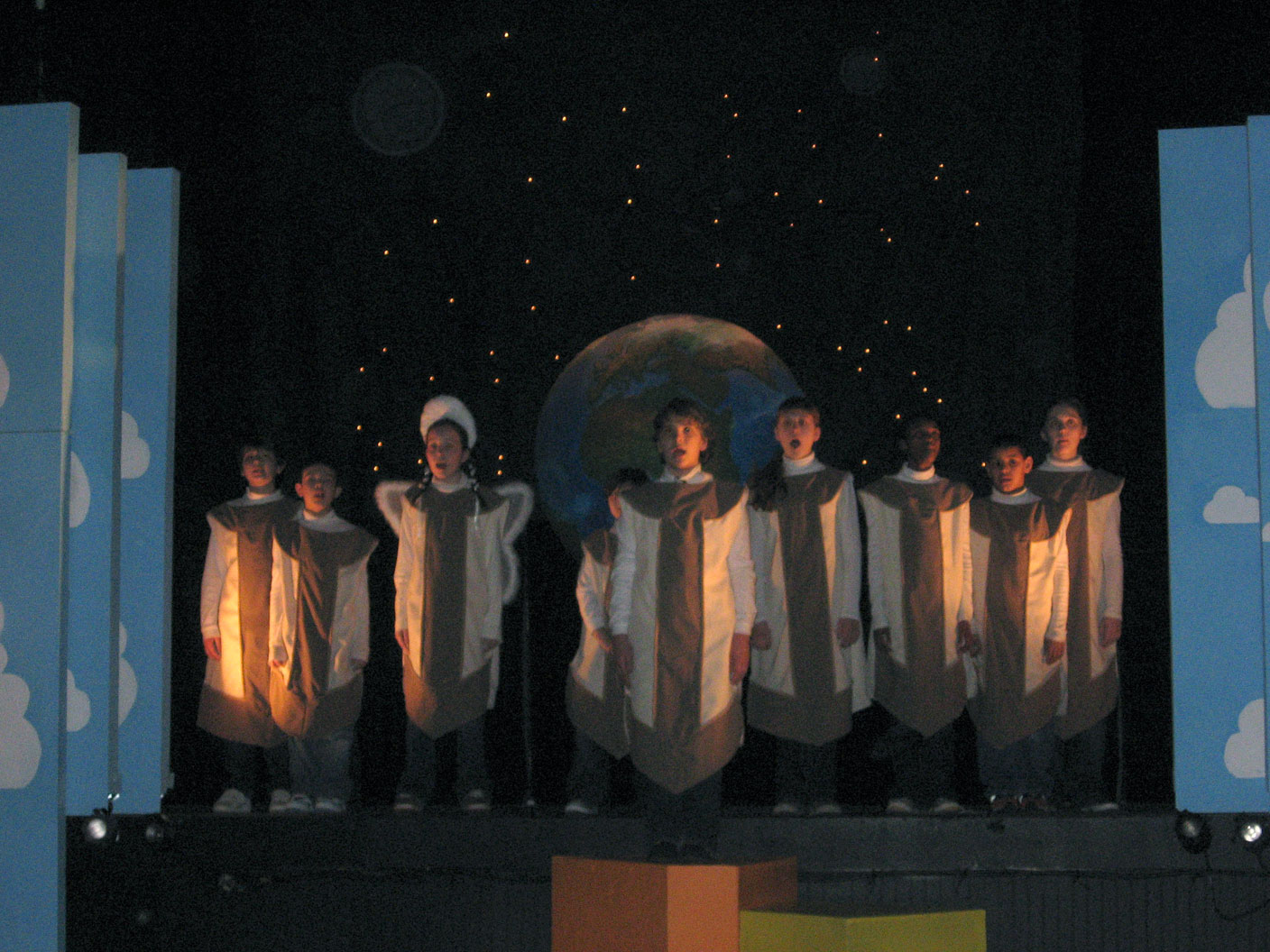
Finale, 2007 Philadelphia production

As Hubbard's followers progress in their Scientology teachings, they learn of the story of evil alien prince Xenu. Celebrity actor characters describe their relationships with Scientology: John Travolta explains how Scientology "fueled his cool"; Kirstie Alley says that it helped her conquer drug addiction "enabling me to star in the fine television series Fat Actress and to promote the quality products of weight loss expert Jenny Craig"; and Tom Cruise interacts with sock-puppet incarnations of his new wife and daughter. The Internal Revenue Service brings a case against Hubbard, but he is able to defeat the tax charges by brainwashing his accuser. Celebrities Cruise, Alley and Travolta testify on Hubbard's behalf during the trial. Skeptics question Hubbard about the Church of Scientology's finances and methods of recruiting and retaining members. One young boy, left alone on the stage, sings about profound alienation. The entire company finally comes together to sing the "chilling finale", which includes the refrain: "Just don't ask questions / And everything is clear."

== Musical analysis ==
Jarrow incorporated musical themes from The Road to Freedom, a 1986 pop album with lyrics by Hubbard and performances by John Travolta, Leif Garrett, Frank Stallone, Chick Corea, and Karen Black. Jarrow also incorporated musical themes from 1980s pop, saying "the liturgical music of Scientology is 1980s pop, which seems strangely appropriate because of the science fiction books. So that's what we did [in the show]. It's a pastiche of synth-pop and pageant choir music." Jarrow said he tried "to capture the feel of kiddie rock" such as Free to Be... You and Me and Kids Incorporated.

The song, "Hey! It's a Happy Day!" quotes Hubbard's Scientology: A New Slant On Life. Songs are set to "cheesy synth-keyboard backing" and feature "sublimely clunky dance breaks". An electronic score emphasizes the musical's "loony conviction", while sleigh bells give the play a feeling of a "jazzed-up saint's play". The songs incorporate video game music, and "beats from a child's keyboard synthesizer." The music in the show has been compared with the symphonic band Polyphonic Spree, and with the educational short films of Schoolhouse Rock.

== Productions ==
=== 2003–2004 ===
A Very Merry Unauthorized Children's Scientology Pageant debuted in November 2003, and had sold-out Off-Off-Broadway and Off-Broadway runs that winter, both directed by Alex Timbers. The musical was initially shown at The Tank theater on 42nd Street where it ran for three weeks, and later moved to the John Houseman Theatre, where it was performed for an additional three weeks. The show opened in Los Angeles at the Powerhouse Theatre, in October 2004, again directed by Timbers. The run was initially scheduled for October 15 through November 21, 2004, but was extended through December 21, 2004. Timbers said that he was excited to take the production to Los Angeles, commenting: "Since the whole goal of the show is to imagine how the Scientologists might stage a nativity pageant, there's no better place to try than in their Jerusalem."

When the production company first arrived in Los Angeles, the cast and crew were "intimidated" by Scientologists. Scientology officials had previously visited the New York City production in the midst of rehearsals and handed out "documentation of court cases where the Church of Scientology had successfully prosecuted those seeking to disparage the Church's methods." Director/creator Alex Timbers characterized these events as "terrifically wonderful and intimidating". Editors from the Los Angeles Times received phone calls from Scientologists urging them not to write about the play. In addition, the parents of one of the children from the cast received phone calls from members of the entertainment industry who were Scientologists. The parents of these cast members were told that if their children performed in the play, "it might be bad for their future career." The parents politely informed these callers "We read the script, and we don't think it is mean-spirited ... We understand your concerns, but we don't share your concerns." When asked by Variety magazine for the Church's official take on the play, a Los Angeles Church of Scientology spokeswoman was quoted as saying: "This is not litigation material. This is nothing." In a 2007 interview, Jarrow commented on the Church of Scientology's history of responses to productions of the play: "It's clear the Church doesn't like the show—but in my opinion that kind of controversy is evidence that the show's hitting a nerve and dealing with pertinent issues. So I take a certain pride in that."

=== 2006–present ===
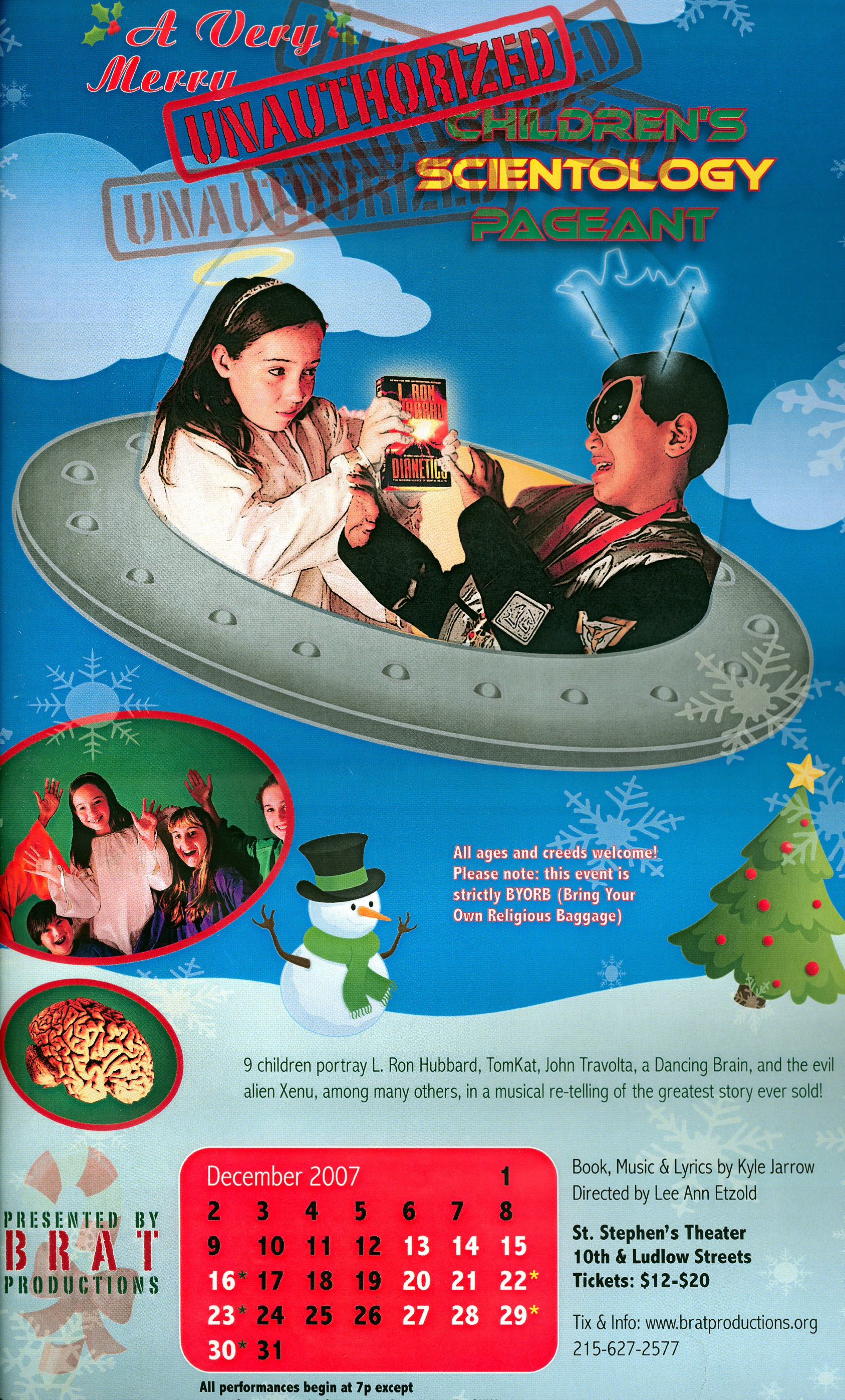
Poster for 2007 Philadelphia production

In late 2006, the musical was performed at New York Theatre Workshop's 4th Street Theatre in New York City, with Alex Timbers reprising his role as director and Gabriel Kahane as musical director. That same year, the show was also presented at the Boston Center for the Arts in Boston by Boston Theatre Works, and at Dad's Garage Theatre in Atlanta. The Boston production was directed by Jason Southerland. When contacted by The Boston Globe for a statement on the Boston production, Boston Church of Scientology president Gerard Renna stated that the musical: "is not something we're addressing" and that they were instead focused on antidrug education.

Dad's Garage Theatre presented the musical again in 2007, from November 30 to December 23, 2007. The entire cast from the 2006 production returned, and director Mary Claire Dunn emphasized that she educated the cast about Scientology on the first day of rehearsal. Theater company Brat Productions in Philadelphia, Pennsylvania also put on a 2007 production, with performances from December 13 through December 30, 2007 at St. Stephen's Theater. The production was directed by Lee Ann Etzold. Landless Theatre Company in Washington, D.C. also presented the musical from December 20, 2007 through January 13, 2008 at the District of Columbia Arts Center in Adams Morgan. Andrew Lloyd Baughman was the director and music director.

Rarely Done Productions in Syracuse, New York put on a production of the play, which ran from October 3 to October 18, 2008. Circle Theatre in Fort Worth, Texas has announced a 2008 production, which ran November 20 to December 20, 2008. Know Theatre of Cincinnati, Ohio planned a 2008 production December 6 through January, 2008. Ron May, artistic director of Stray Cat Theatre in Phoenix, Arizona, also planned a production of the play for the 2008 season, and A Red Orchid Theatre in Chicago, Illinois planned a production to run from November 17 to December 28, 2008. Representatives for the Church of Scientology did not respond to repeated requests for comment from the Chicago Tribune about the 2008 Chicago production.

The 2008 Chicago production was well received, and A Red Orchid Theatre again put on a production of the play in its 2009–2010 season. The Chicago production was directed by Steve Wilson, and ran from November 12, 2009 through January 3, 2010. The play's artistic director, Kirsten Fitzgerald spoke positively of rehearsals for the Chicago production: "The energy that explodes into the theatre with the start of each rehearsal is palpable and impossible to deny, even from the office next door. I am ecstatic and so very grateful to bring last year's smash-hit to audiences old and new. The heart of last year's joyous and hilarious Chicago Premiere returns with plenty of surprises and new fun up our sleeves." Crain's Chicago Business ranked the production as one of the top ten things to do for the weekend in the city. Another Illinois production ran from December 7, 2009 to January 3, 2010, by Next Theatre in Evanston.

A 2010 production was planned in Clearwater, Florida, for showings December 2 through December 22. The play in Clearwater is produced by American Stage for the After Hours series. A representative for the theater, Andy Orrell, told the St. Petersburg Times, "The After Hours series does shows that are more avant garde, more risque, shows that we couldn't really do on the main stage. In a lot of ways, this show fits perfectly into that criteria." Clearwater is a spiritual headquarters for the Scientology organization; when contacted for a statement by St. Petersburg Times, Kyle Jarrow responded, "Wow! – I had no idea they were doing the show down there. Clearwater is almost ground zero for Scientology. That's sure to be extra controversial." The American Stage Theatre Company performs out of the Raymond James Theatre in St. Petersburg, Florida. The Actors Guild of Lexington in Lexington, Kentucky planned a production to run from April 7 – 17, 2011, directed by the group's artistic director Eric Seale.

=== 2017–present ===
In 2017, Sean Pollock began work on reviving the show in New York City as a director and production designer. As a result, an initial concert version was staged at Feinstein's/54 Below with music direction by Luke McGinnis featuring cut material from the original score. This was the first time that the score had been heard in New York since the last revival in 2006. The concert was produced by Unattended Baggage with Broadway Records' founder Van Dean starring children from Broadway shows such as Kinky Boots, Fun Home, 1984, Falsettos and The King and I. A restaging of the concert was held at Greenroom 42 in September 2018, featuring new cast members from School of Rock, The Lion King and Pippin with James Healy as musical director, with Pollock returning as director. In November 2022, the show was filmed as a television special in the style of NBC Live! Off-Broadway which was titled A Very Merry Unauthorized Children's Scientology Pageant - Live!. which was directed, designed, produced, & adapted for television by Pollock, with a re-orchestrated score by Richard Lowenburg. The special can be viewed free of charge on IFT Network which earned positive notices.

== Reception ==
=== Awards ===
A Very Merry Unauthorized Children's Scientology Pageant received a 2004 Obie Award for its 2003 production in New York City. Kyle Jarrow and Alex Timbers were given "Special Citations" from The Village Voice for developing the piece. Timbers and Jarrow were honored with the award at the May 17, 2004 Obie Award presentation, at New York's Webster Hall. Alex Timbers also received a Back Stage West Garland Award for best director, for the 2004 Los Angeles production of the play.

=== Reviews ===
A Very Merry Unauthorized Children's Scientology Pageant received positive reviews from the press. A review in The New York Times described the musical as having a "crude, faux-naïf sensibility", and stated that it "provides a cult-hit blueprint for a young generation that prefers its irony delivered with not a wink but a blank stare." A 2003 review in New York City's The Village Voice compared the show to The Resistible Rise of Arturo Ui, stating: "Just as Ui doesn't explain the complex phenomenon of the Third Reich, Scientology Pageant doesn't probe the psychology of cults; instead, both demystify subjects whose appeal stems in no small part from the mystique their acolytes have attributed to them." Though most of the media reception of the musical was positive, New York Church of Scientology President John Carmichael did not have kind words for the production. Carmichael asserted that L. Ron Hubbard was portrayed in the play as "an authoritarian demagogue whose methods create emotionless followers." Other critics complained that the young members of the cast were portraying characters and depicting content that they could not understand.

The Los Angeles Times review in 2004 stated that: "The show found a New York audience willing to move from the tongue-in-cheek children's pageant concept to something that became startlingly adult." In a 2004 review in The Guardian, the article cited notable quotes from other reviews, including The New York Times, The Village Voice, and The New York Observer. The review stated that audiences "have a chance to witness a wide-eyed, straight-faced, scrappy and touching telling of the story of L Ron set to a cheesy electro-pop score. See the great man, clad in a white Plyphonic [sic] Spree-style gown, wander from inquisitive soul to wounded war veteran to writer of pulp science fiction to leader of world religion. Sort of."

Of the updated 2006 version, Variety stated that "the breezy one-hour show is equal parts adorable and creepy, hilarious and unsettling, making it way more compelling than your average holiday entertainment." The Boston Globe also reviewed the 2006 edition of the play, and its review spent more time giving background on some of the cast and crew, particularly writer Kyle Jarrow, stating that "Jarrow has created a musical about L. Ron Hubbard that is, in its own sardonic way, much more funny and touching than any of Cruise's diatribes against Ritalin." The New York Sun described the production as an: "ingenious musical account of L. Ron Hubbard's life and times", and compared the discomfort produced by watching the piece to that produced by the 2006 documentary Jesus Camp.

The 2007 Philadelphia production also received favorable reviews, and critic Wendy Rosenfield of The Philadelphia Inquirer wrote "somehow the production emerges triumphant, retaining its innocent sense of inquiry and buoyant good humor while making some pretty serious philosophical points." A review in The Washington Post of the 2007 Washington, D.C. production was more critical. Peter Marks wrote that "aside from a weird sci-fi back story involving Prince Xenu, a figure from Scientology lore, the incidents the playwright relates that shape Hubbard's belief system unfold choppily and dryly." The production received a positive review in by Bob Anthony in AllArtsReview4U, who wrote "This is so charming that it rates a "must see" status. The show should be extended at another venue." Manya Brachear reviewed the 2008 Chicago production for the Chicago Tribune, and highlighted the play's "trilling tunes", including "Hey! It's a Happy Day!" and "The Science of the Mind". The two Chicago productions in 2009 also received favorable reviews in the Chicago Tribune; the reviewer noted, "this show manages to simultaneously skewer Scientology and showcase the young performers in an upbeat, fun way."

== Original Cast recording ==
A Very Merry Unauthorized Children's Scientology Pageant

Studio album by Les Freres Corbusier
- Released: November 2, 2004
- Recorded: New York, New York
- Genre: Musical
- Length: 35:14
- Label: Sh-K-Boom
- Producers: Kurt Deutsch, Jacob Schwartz, Aaron Lemon-Strauss

Professional ratings
Review scores
Source	Rating
Allmusic	4/5 stars

A cast recording of the musical was released by Kurt Deutsch's Sh-K-Boom Records, on November 2, 2004. "Hey! It's a Happy Day!", "Science of the Mind", "Rain", and "Finale" are tracks from the original 2004 production. The other songs on the album were written by Jarrow "to further explore the subjects and themes of the stage production." The first track on the album is entitled "Disclaimer", and is a general announcement to the audience. The Los Angeles Daily News surmised that this disclaimer served to "keep the creators of this acidic little send-up from getting hauled into court":

Ladies and gentlemen: Before we go any further, I would just like to inform you, that Scientology, Scientologist, Dianetics, and the name L. Ron Hubbard, are registered trademarks – owned exclusively by the Church of Scientology. Thank you. Now let's get on with the show!

— "Disclaimer", CD Soundtrack, Sh-K-Boom Records, 2004

The CD release received four out of five stars from Allmusic, where it was described as "Funny, weird and wonderful", and "the offbeat theater offering of the year". Specific tracks highlighted by Allmusic included "L. Ron Hubbard", in which the chorus centers on the question: "What does the 'L.' stand for?", and "The Way It Began" [sic], which begins with the preface statement: "The following is completely secret and absolutely serious. It is the story of the universe as described in the most sacred literature of the Church of Scientology." In the song "Mister Auditor", the children actually sing some of the typical questions asked in Scientology auditing, and in the song "Something Special", allegations that the Church of Scientology "preys on the weak and confused" are discussed, but the narrator states that none of these allegations are true.

2004 Cast Recording

1. "Disclaimer" – 0:18
2. "Hey! It's a Happy Day!" – 4:37
3. "L. Ron Hubbard" – 3:44
4. "The Way That It Began" – 3:10
5. "Searching" – 2:33
6. "Science of the Mind" – 2:44
7. "Mister Auditor" – 3:18
8. "Rain" – 4:11
9. "Something Special" – 3:40
10. "Finale" – 2:40
11. "Rain With the Fabulous Entourage" – 3:52

== 2022 Revival Cast Live Recording ==
In 2023, the live audio from A Very Merry Unauthorized Children's Scientology Pageant - Live! was preserved in the form of a live cast album on Soundcloud, with all new orchestrations. The tracks are:

2022 Revival Cast Live Recording

1. "Hey! It's a Happy Day!" – 3:40
2. "L. Ron Hubbard" – 3:52
3. "Searching" – 2:30
4. "Science of the Mind (Part One)" – 2:34
5. "Science of the Mind (Part Two)" - 2:32
6. "Mister Auditor" – 3:19
7. "The Way That It Began" – 3:12
8. "Rain" – 3:44
9. "Finale" – 2:34

== See also ==
- Parody
- Parody religion
- Religious satire
- Scientology beliefs and practices
- Scientology in popular culture
