= Janel Moloney =

American actress (b. 1969)

- Moloney in 2026
- Born: October 3, 1969 (age 57); Woodland Hills, California, U.S.
- Occupation: Actress
- Years active: 1987–present
- Spouse: Marcelo Zarvos (m. 2010)
- Children: 2

Janel Moloney (born October 3, 1969) is an American actress. She is best known for her role as Donna Moss on the television series The West Wing, a role for which she received two nominations for the Primetime Emmy Award for Outstanding Supporting Actress in a Drama Series, in 2002 and 2004. From 2014 to 2017, she starred in the television series The Leftovers.

== Career ==
=== Television ===
Her early work included television guest roles on ER, Sports Night, The Adventures of Brisco County, Jr., and Murder, She Wrote. Starting in 1999, Moloney had a main role on The West Wing as Donna Moss, beginning as an assistant to Deputy White House Chief of Staff Josh Lyman (Bradley Whitford) before pursuing further ambitions in the next election. Moloney was originally credited only as a guest star, but she appeared in every episode of the first season. From the second season onward, Moloney was listed in the main credits. She has received two Emmy Award nominations, one in 2002 and one in 2004, for Outstanding Supporting Actress in a Drama.

Moloney appeared in the television film Bang Bang You're Dead with Thomas Cavanagh and Randy Harrison, which was first broadcast on October 13, 2002, on Showtime. She played the part of Amber Frey in the made-for-TV movie Amber Frey: Witness for the Prosecution, broadcast May 25, 2005, on CBS. In 2007, Moloney played Dana Chase, who has a relationship with Tommy Caffee (Jason Clarke) in six episodes of the second season of Brotherhood.

In 2008, Moloney appeared in one episode ("It's a Wonderful Lie") of House M.D. In 2008, she guest-starred in an episode of 30 Rock. Moloney appeared in the 3rd installment of the Lstudio.com web series Puppy Love.

In 2009, she appeared in the American series Life on Mars as Professor Pat Olsen in the episode "Revenge of the Broken Jaw". She also appeared in the episode "Faithfully" of Law & Order: Criminal Intent as Allison Wyler.

Moloney had a recurring role in the first season of HBO drama The Leftovers, and was bumped up to a main role for the following two seasons (2014-2017).

=== Theatre ===
In 2007, Moloney made her Off-Broadway stage debut as Theresa in the Playwrights Horizons production 100 Saints You Should Know, written by Kate Fodor and directed by Ethan McSweeny. She appeared in the Off-Broadway play Love, Loss, and What I Wore in September through October 2, 2011.

=== Film ===
Moloney starred in the 2010 feature film Armless, as Anna. She made a brief appearance as Earlene in the 1995 Walter Hill directed western Wild Bill, and appears in the 2013 film Concussion.

== Personal life ==
Moloney has two sons, Julian and Fernando, with composer Marcelo Zarvos, whom she married in 2010. She launched a newsletter on Substack in 2025.

== Filmography ==
=== Film ===
Year	Title	Role	Notes
1993	Dream Lover	Alice Keller	
1995	Safe	Hairdresser	
1995	Wild Bill	Earlene	
1997	''Til There Was You	Beebee Moss, Age 25	
1998	Desperate Measures	Sarah Davis	
1998	The Souler Opposite	Thea Douglas	
2002	Bang Bang You're Dead	Ellie Milford	
2005	Just Pray	Cheryl Lawson	Short
2010	Armless	Anna	
2013	Concussion	Pru	
2014	Stay Then Go	Marion Baird	
2016	Half the Perfect World	Gina	
2017	The Leisure Seeker	Jane	

=== Television ===
Year	Title	Role	Notes
1987	Roomies	Punk Co-Ed	Episode: "The One That Got Away"
1991	To Save a Child	Janelle Lowry	TV movie
1991	...And Then She Was Gone	Mary	TV movie
1992	Double Edge	Jen	TV movie
1993	The Adventures of Brisco County, Jr.	Mary Sims	Episode: "Pirates!"
1993	Bakersfield P.D.	Sarah	Episode: "Lucky 13"
1995	ER	Mrs. Nancy Larson	Episode: "The Birthday Party"
1995	Murder, She Wrote	Maria Corbin	Episode: "Unwilling Witness"
1996	High Incident	Bridesmaid McManus	Episode: "Till Death Do Us Part"
1998	Sports Night	Monica Brazelton	Episode: "The Six Southern Gentlemen of Tennessee"
1999–2006	The West Wing	Donna Moss	149 episodes Screen Actors Guild Award for Outstanding Performance by an Ensemble in a Drama Series (2001, 2002); Nominated – Primetime Emmy Award for Outstanding Supporting Actress in a Drama Series (2002, 2004); Nominated – Screen Actors Guild Award for Outstanding Performance by an Ensemble in a Drama Series (2003–2006)
2005	Amber Frey: Witness for the Prosecution	Amber Frey	TV movie
2007	Brotherhood	Dana Chase	5 episodes
2008	House	Maggie	Episode: "It's a Wonderful Lie"
2008	Puppy Love	Allegra	
2008	30 Rock	Jessica Speyer	Episode: "Reunion"
2009	Life on Mars	Pat Olsen	Episode: "Revenge of Broken Jaw"
2009	Law & Order: Criminal Intent	Allison Wyler	Episode: "Faithfully"
2009	Captain Cook's Extraordinary Atlas	Marion Malloy	TV movie
2012	Walk and Talk the Vote: West Wing Reunion - Bridget Mary McCormack	Donna Moss	Video short
2013	The Good Wife	Kathy Eisenstadt	Episode: "A Precious Commodity"
2014–2017	The Leftovers	Mary Jamison	Recurring (season 1), main role (season 2–3)
2014	Alpha House	Senator Peg Stanchion	4 episodes
2015	The Blacklist	Kat Goodson	2 episodes
2017	American Crime	Raelyn	5 episodes
2018	Law & Order: Special Victims Unit	Dr. Lorraine Franchella	Episode: "Dare"
2018–2019	The Affair	Ariel	2 episodes
2020	A West Wing Special to Benefit When We All Vote	Donna Moss	TV special
2020	The Undoing	Sally Morrison	2 episodes
2021	Bull	ADA Sutherland	Episode: "Fallen Idols"
2021	FBI	Hannah Thompson	Episode: "Fire and Rain"
2022	Law & Order: Organized Crime	Deputy Inspector Lillian Goldfarb	5 episodes
2025	The Better Sister	Sheila	5 episodes
2026	Furious	Raquel	
