= Daniel London =

American actor (born 1973)

- Born: 1973 (age 52–53); Mt. Lebanon, Pennsylvania, U.S.
- Occupation: Actor
- Years active: 1997–present
- Spouse: Megan Reilly

Daniel London (born 1973) is an American actor, best known for his roles in Patch Adams (1998), Minority Report (2002) and its sequel-series, Rent (2005), and Old Joy (2006).

== Life and career ==
Born and raised in Mt. Lebanon, Pennsylvania, London began writing and acting in plays in high school. While he was a student at Mt. Lebanon High School, from which he graduated in 1991, his play The Martha War was performed at the Kennedy Center in Washington, D.C.

London attended Oberlin College, where he continued to act while majoring in English. He moved to New York City after his graduation in 1995 to begin his acting career.

London landed one of his first major roles, alongside Robin Williams, in the 1998 film Patch Adams. He also appeared on stage in two Beth Henley plays. London played Wally, the caretaker of the Pre-Cogs, in Minority Report in 2002. He also starred with Will Oldham in the 2006 film Old Joy.

London lives in Brooklyn, New York, with his singer/songwriter wife, Megan Reilly.

== Filmography ==
=== Film ===
Year	Title	Role	Notes
1998	Patch Adams	Truman Schiff	
2000	Four Dogs Playing Poker	Kevin	
2000	Lisa Picard is Famous	Boyfriend	
2001	My Best Friend's Wife	Eric Meyer	
2002	Big Trouble	John/Ivan	
2002	Minority Report	Wally the Caretaker	
2005	Rent	Paul	
2006	Old Joy	Mark	
2007	Arranged	Elliot	
2008	The Toe Tactic	Elevator Man	
2008	Synecdoche, New York	Tom	
2009	The Bridge to Nowhere	Chris	
2010	Armless	John	
2010	Its Kind of a Funny Story	Solomon	
2012	On the Inside	Nathan Parks	
2012	The Exhibitionists	Gordo	
2013	Concussion	Evan	
2013	Clutter	Miles Bickford	
2014	Listen Up Philip	Seth	
2014	Saint Janet	Billy	
2018	Vox Lux	Father Cliff	
2019	The Report	CIA Officer Fox	
2024	Friendship	Stan	

=== Television ===
Year	Title	Role	Notes
1997	The Garden of Redemption	Pepe	TV movie
1998	A Soldier's Sweetheart	Eddie Diamond	TV movie
1998	The First Seven Years	Max	TV movie
1999	Third Watch	Epstein	Episode: "Impulse"
2002	The Sopranos	Eddie	2 episodes
2002, 2010	Law & Order: Criminal Intent	Mark Bayley / Dr. Joel Silverstern	2 episodes
2008	Law & Order	Bradley Cameron	Episode: "Bogeyman"
2009	Fringe	Agent Feiken	Episode: "Midnight"
2009	Nurse Jackie	Mr. Batali	2 episodes
2009	The Good Wife	Isaac Loeb	Episode: "Unorthodox"
2011	The Confession	Jimmy	Episode: "Chapter 1"
2011	Mildred Pierce	Mo Levinson	Episode: "Part Five"
2011	Weekends at Bellevue	Steven	TV movie
2013	Blue Bloods	Tyler Green	Episode: "Front Page News"
2014	The Americans	Roy Oatway	Episode: "Comrades"
2014	Black Box	Dean Norwood	Episode: "I Shall Be Released"
2014	Gotham	Stan Potolsky	Episode: "Viper"
2014–2015	Manhattan	J. Robert Oppenheimer	8 episodes
2015	Minority Report	Wally the Caretaker	10 episodes
2016	The Blacklist	Drexel	Episode: "Drexel (No. 113)"
2016	Elementary	Mateo Pena	Episode: "All In"
2016	Blindspot	Emile	Episode: "We Fight Deaths on Thick Lone Waters"
2018	Bull	Mark Zimmer	Episode: "Grey Areas"
2018	Instinct	Dan	Episode: "Pilot"
2018	Deception	Miller Mackenzie	Episode: "Divination"
2018	God Friended Me	Aleksander Leff	Episode: "King's Gambit"
2019	Prodigal Son	Roger	Episode: "Designer Complicity"
2020	Law & Order: Special Victims Unit	Ash Gordon	Episode: "Solving for the Unknowns"
2020	Hollywood	George Cukor	2 episodes
2023	FBI	James Leavins	Episode: "The Lies We Tell"
2023	The Crowded Room	Greg	2 episodes
2024	Lady in the Lake	Dr. Kornblatt	2 episodes

== Plays ==
- Impossible Marriage, by Beth Henley (Roundabout Theatre Company, 1998)
- More Lies About Jerzy, by Davey Holmes (Vineyard Theater, 2001)
- Ridiculous Fraud, by Beth Henley (McCarter Theater, 2006)
- Offices, by Ethan Coen (Atlantic Theater Company, 2009)
