= Azar Mohammadi =

- آذر محمدی
- Born: 1974 (age 51–52); Tehran, Iran
- Occupation: Costume designer
- Years active: 2000–present
- Notable work: Mokhtarnameh, Farouk Omar, Moses the Kalimullah: At Dawn
- Awards: Crystal Simorgh for Best Costume Design (2025)

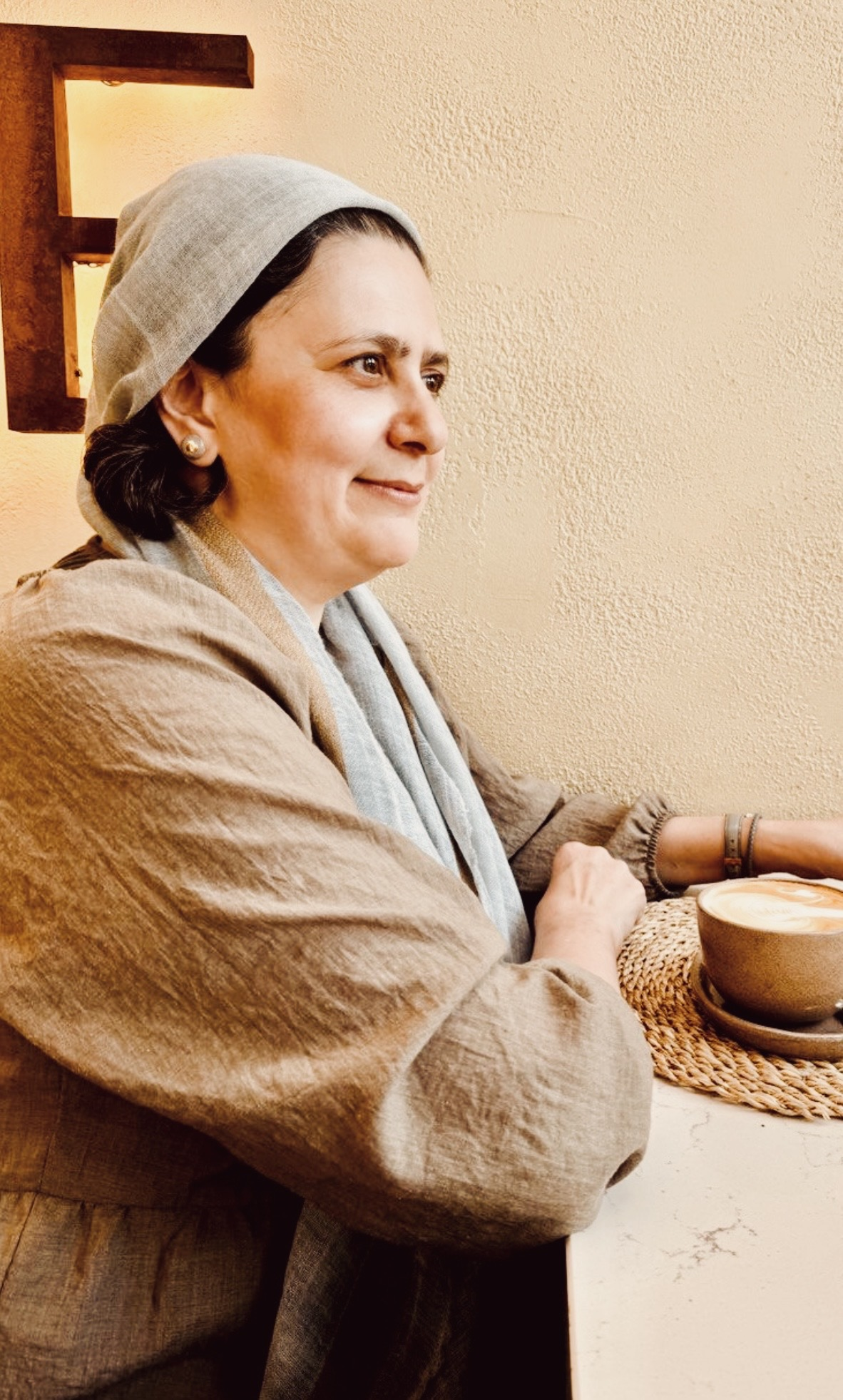
Azar Mohammadi

Azar Mohammadi (Persian: آذر محمدی; born 1974 in Tehran) is an Iranian costume designer specialising in historical film and television dramas. She is known for leading wardrobe design on large-scale productions such as Mokhtarnameh, Farouk Omar, and Moses the Kalimullah: At Dawn. Her work is noted for historical authenticity, extensive archival research, and the management of large workshops producing custom textiles and dyes. In February 2025 she received the Crystal Simorgh for Best Costume Design at the 43rd Fajr International Film Festival for her work on Moses the Kalimullah: At Dawn.

== Career ==
Mohammadi began working in television in the early 2000s, with her first credited work on the drama series Masumiyat az dast rafte (Innocence Lost, 2002–2003).

From 2003 to 2010 she designed costumes for Davood Mir-Baqeri’s epic series Mokhtarnameh, which required outfitting hundreds of characters with historically researched garments and accessories. She later served as principal costume designer for the Arabic-language historical drama Farouk Omar (2010–2012), produced by the MBC network in Syria and Morocco.

In 2020 she joined Rasoul Sadrameli’s production Moses the Kalimullah: At Dawn. Mohammadi led a four-year design process that included extensive archival research in museums and libraries, commissioning custom weaving and dyeing workshops, and supervising a large team of artisans. She described the production as the most ambitious of her career.

== Artistic style ==
Mohammadi has stated that her approach to historical design combines detailed research with practical workshop methods. She emphasizes the importance of textiles and color palettes in narrative design and has argued for the “conscious use” of technology in costume production to support, rather than replace, traditional craftsmanship.

== Selected works ==
- Masumiyat az dast rafte (2002–2003)
- Mokhtarnameh (2003–2010)
- Farouk Omar (2010–2012)
- Moses the Kalimullah: At Dawn (2020–2025)

== Awards ==
- Crystal Simorgh for Best Costume Design, 43rd Fajr International Film Festival (2025)
