= Betty Azar =

American academic

- Born: 1941 (age 84–85)
- Occupation: Educator

Betty Schrampfer Azar (born 1941) is the author of the Azar Grammar Series for students of English as a second language (ESL), with a strong focus on English grammar as the basis of all language skills.

The series is in its fifth edition. With the addition of co-author Stacy A. Hagen in 2006, the series is now known as the Azar-Hagen Grammar Series.

There are three principal textbooks in the series: Understanding and Using English Grammar, Fundamentals of English Grammar, and Basic English Grammar.

In 2017, TESOL International Association named the Betty Azar Travel Grant for Practicing ESL ESL/EFL Teachers in her honor. This grant helps pay for participants to travel to the association's annual conference.

Following the retirement of Betty S. Azar and her staff, www.azargrammar.com shut down on November 10, 2020.
