= Danyelle Sargent =

American sports announcer (born 1978)

- Born: May 7, 1978 (age 48)
- Education: Florida State University
- Spouse: Eric Musselman
- Children: 1

Danyelle Sargent-Musselman (born May 7, 1978) is an American former sports television reporter.

== Biography ==
=== Education and early career ===
Sargent is a graduate of Florida State University and began her television career at WGXA, in Macon, Georgia. Prior to joining ESPN, she worked as a sports reporter and anchor for Metro Sports, a local Time Warner Cable sports channel in Kansas City, Missouri from 2002 until 2004. She served as sideline reporter for the Kansas City Chiefs during the 2004 pre-season. She served as co-emcee of the 2005 and 2006 NCAA woman of the year awards.

=== ESPN ===
Sargent was hired in 2004 by the television network ESPN to work on its ESPNEWS channel. She also contributed to ESPN2's Cold Pizza, now titled ESPN First Take. Sargent was the subject of a minor controversy on March 9, 2006, when a series of technical difficulties occurred while she was co-anchoring a live broadcast of ESPNEWS, leading ESPN to air a taped segment. Thinking her microphone had been cut (which is the normal procedure when a taped segment is playing), she exclaimed, "What the fuck was that?" over the broadcast. Sargent's two-year contract with ESPN was not renewed when it expired in the fall of 2006.

=== Fox Sports ===
Sargent made her Fox Sports Net debut on FSN Final Score on November 5, 2006. Her last night anchoring FSN Final Score was on June 27, 2011. She also appeared in a taped segment during the last FSN Final Score later that week on July 1, 2011.

During her time at Fox Sports, another controversy occurred on Sunday, October 26, 2008. While working as a sideline reporter, Sargent was conducting a taped, pre-game interview with the new head coach of the San Francisco 49ers, Mike Singletary, and said, "I heard that your mentor, Bill Walsh, was one of the first phone calls that you made when you found out that you had the job. What does it mean to you to be the head coach of the 49ers?" The interview was abruptly halted when the reporter was informed by her producers that Walsh had died on July 30, 2007. The unauthorized video was never aired on the game broadcast, but did air on Mike Francesa's WNBC-TV/Channel 4 program, Mike’d Up.

=== Comedy Central ===
Onion SportsDome on Comedy Central premiered in January 2011 and ran for one season with Sargent as fictional sportscaster Melissa Wells.

=== Yahoo ===
Sargent served as a host for Yahoo! Sports from 2011 to 2012, covering college football, the NFL, fantasy football, NASCAR, and high school recruiting.

=== NFL Network ===
Sargent was an update anchor for NFL Network. She was on-air for several notable NFL moments, including Peyton Manning's decision to play for the Denver Broncos and Tim Tebow's trade from the Broncos to the New York Jets. Her last day at NFL Network was in April 2013.

== Personal life ==
Sargent is married to the head coach of the University of Southern California men's basketball, Eric Musselman. She gave birth to the couple's daughter in 2010. Sargent also has two stepsons.
