= Habib Azar =

American television director

Habib Azar (born October 19, 1979, in Pennsylvania, United States) is an American film, theater and television director based in New York City. He married his wife, Carla Azar, in 2011, and has two children.

== Career ==
=== Film ===
Azar directed the 2018 cinemacast of Marnie for the Metropolitan Opera's Live in HD series. Azar directed the Live From Lincoln Center film production of Pipeline, a play by Dominque Morisseau, during its 2017 Off-Broadway run at Lincoln Center Theater's Mitzi E. Newhouse Theater. He is the director of the New York Philharmonic's Facebook live series.

His first feature film, Armless is an off-kilter comedy about a man who suffers from body integrity dysphoria. The film was selected by the 2010 Sundance Film Festival, as part of a new category for innovative low-budget films. His second feature film Saint Janet stars Kelly Bishop and was released by Indie Rights.

=== Stage ===
Azar's stage work focuses on world premiere and rarely performed contemporary operas.

He directed the world premiere of the original chamber version of Du Yun's Angel's Bone with the International Contemporary Ensemble commissioned by the Mann Center for the Performing Arts. Angel's Bone went on to win the Pulitzer Prize in Music.

He directed the American stage premiere of Georg Friedrich Haas' ATTHIS in a production that had the heroine bound in duct tape. In the climactic scene she stripped naked by violently ripping the duct tape from her body in what The New York Times said 'must be one of the most searingly painful and revealing operatic performances of recent times.'

His other productions include the world premiere of Lewis Nielson's USW with Opera Cabal of Chicago and the 2007 production of Luigi Nono's rarely performed A Floresta e Jovem e Cheja de Vida with the International Contemporary Ensemble toured the US and Mexico and was the subject of an extended analysis in The Drama Review.

Azar has directed numerous plays including Gorilla Man at PS122.

=== Television ===
In 2013 Azar directed all 8 episodes of the groundbreaking series The All Star Orchestra for PBS. The program gathered principal musicians from major American orchestras to film concert works especially for television. Other live multi-camera arts specials directed by Azar include Yo-Yo Ma for Live from Lincoln Center, The New York Philharmonic, Kronos Quartet, Lang Lang, Mariinsky Orchestra, Merce Cunningham Dance Company, the National Symphony Orchestra, NHK Symphony Orchestra, and the Chamber Music Society of Lincoln Center.

Azar has worked extensively in soap operas, having directed multiple episodes of As the World Turns, The Young and the Restless, All My Children, and One Life to Live.

== Awards and nominations ==
Azar has won 8 Emmy Awards for his work in TV.

Daytime Emmy Award

- Win, 2007, Directing, As the World Turns
- Nominated, 2012, Directing, The Young and the Restless
- Win, 2014, Directing, One Life to Live

Northwest Regional Emmy Award

- Win, 2016, Directing, The All Star Orchestra

New York Emmy Award

- Win, 2014, Directing, The All Star Orchestra
- Win, 2015, Directing, The All Star Orchestra
- Win, 2017, Directing, The All Star Orchestra
- Win, 2019, Directing, US Marine Band with The All Star Orchestra
- Win, 2021, Director, The All Star Orchestra
