= Brighter: A Duncan Sheik Collection =

Greatest hits album by Duncan Sheik
- Released: March 6, 2007
- Length: 65:10
- Label: Rhino Records

Duncan Sheik chronology
Brighter/Later: A Duncan Sheik Anthology (2006)	Brighter: A Duncan Sheik Collection (2007)	Whisper House (2009)

Brighter: A Duncan Sheik Collection is a compilation album from American singer-songwriter Duncan Sheik, released through Rhino Records. The album is a repackage of the first disc of Brighter/Later: A Duncan Sheik Anthology, which was released in 2006.

== Track listing ==
1. "That Says It All" - 4:15
2. "Court & Spark" - 3:02**
3. "Lost On The Moon" - 5:09
4. "Wishful Thinking" - 4:25
5. "Genius" - 3:42
6. "Bite Your Tongue" - 3:58
7. "She Runs Away" - 3:43
8. "Rubbed Out" - 5:10
9. "Mr. Chess" - 2:38
10. "Half-Life" - 3:58
11. "The Winds That Blow" - 3:03
12. "In Between" - 4:32
13. "Mouth on Fire" - 5:39
14. "Barely Breathing" - 4:15
15. "Home" (Live @ World Cafe) - 6:45
16. "On a High" - 3:36

**Previously unissued
