= Brighter/Later: A Duncan Sheik Anthology =

Compilation album by Duncan Sheik
- Released: October 24, 2006
- Recorded: 1996–2003
- Genre: Rock
- Label: Rhino Records

Duncan Sheik chronology
White Limousine (2006)	Brighter/Later: A Duncan Sheik Anthology (2006)	Brighter: A Duncan Sheik Collection (2007)

Professional ratings
Review scores
Source	Rating
AllMusic	4/5 stars

Brighter/Later: A Duncan Sheik Anthology is a compilation album by American singer-songwriter Duncan Sheik. It was released on Rhino Records in 2006.

== Details ==
The title of the two-disc album is a play on (and tribute to) singer-songwriter Nick Drake's second album, Bryter Layter. In addition to singles, album cuts, and concert favorites, the album contains a number of rarities and previously unreleased tracks, including a studio recording of "Lost On The Moon" (from the international-only version of the Daylight album), "Wishful Thinking" from the Great Expectations soundtrack, an unreleased recording of Joni Mitchell's "Court And Spark", an unreleased remix of "For You", a new live recording of "Home", and "hidden" tracks from Humming (the eight-minute "Foreshadowing") and Daylight ("Chimera").

== Track listing ==
=== Disc 1: Brighter ===
1. "That Says It All" - 4:15
2. "Court & Spark" - 3:02**
3. "Lost On The Moon" - 5:09
4. "Wishful Thinking" - 4:25
5. "Genius" - 3:42
6. "Bite Your Tongue" - 3:58
7. "She Runs Away" - 3:43
8. "Rubbed Out" - 5:10
9. "Mr. Chess" - 2:38
10. "Half-Life" - 3:58
11. "The Winds That Blow" - 3:03
12. "In Between" - 4:32
13. "Mouth On Fire" - 5:39
14. "Barely Breathing" - 4:15
15. "Home" (Live @ World Cafe) - 6:45
16. "On A High" - 3:36

=== Disc 2: Later ===
1. "Memento" - 3:45
2. "Chimera" - 3:55
3. "For You" (Jamie Myerson Mix) - 3:18**
4. "A Body Goes Down" - 6:07
5. "Reasons For Living" - 4:32
6. "Foreshadowing" - 8:09
7. "Sad Stephen's Song" - 6:29
8. "Longing Town" - 3:28
9. "Lo and Behold" - 5:12
10. "November" - 4:52
11. "Days Go By" - 4:48
12. "Requiescat" - 4:00
13. "Little Hands" - 6:06
