= Daylight (Duncan Sheik album) =

Studio album by Duncan Sheik
- Released: 27 August 2002
- Studios: Johnny Yuma Recording (Burbank, California); Capitol Studios (Hollywood, California); Gearbox Recording Studios (Century City, California); Sneaky Studios (Garrison, New York); Angel Recording Studios (London, UK)
- Length: 48:32
- Label: Atlantic
- Producers: Patrick Leonard; Duncan Sheik

Duncan Sheik chronology
Phantom Moon (2001)	Daylight (2002)	White Limousine (2006)

Singles from Daylight
- 1. "On a High" Released: September 7, 2002; 2. "Half-Life" Released: October 3, 2002

Daylight is the fourth album by American singer-songwriter Duncan Sheik. It was released on Atlantic Records in 2002.

== Details ==
The Japanese version included the song "Lost On The Moon" as a bonus track, while a special tour version was released in 2004 with a bonus disc, which included live versions of "Barely Breathing" and "Half-Life", alternate versions of "Bite Your Tongue" and "On a High", and a remix of "Reasons For Living".

"Half-Life" was also featured in the 2003 film What a Girl Wants.

== Reception ==
Professional ratings
Aggregate scores
Source	Rating
Metacritic	(71/100)
Review scores
Source	Rating
AllMusic	3/5 stars
Billboard	(favorable)
Blender	4/5 stars
E! Online	B
Entertainment Weekly	A−
The Music Box	2/5 stars
Paste	(unfavorable)
People	(positive)
Q	3/5 stars
Rolling Stone	2/5 stars

The album was met with moderate commercial success and favorable reviews. Review aggregating website Metacritic reports a normalized score of 71% based on 7 reviews. Entertainment Weekly wrote that "the silky-voiced folk-popster successfully rocks up his sound on his fourth album, adding a polite but firm electric edge".

== Track listing ==
All songs written by Duncan Sheik, except where noted.

1. "Genius" – 3:43
2. "Half-Life" – 3:59
3. "Start Again" (Gerry Leonard) – 3:55
4. "On Her Mind" (Duncan Sheik, Mick Jones) – 4:11
5. "Such Reveries" – 5:00
6. "On a High" – 3:36
7. "Magazines" – 3:47
8. "For You" – 2:11
9. "Good Morning!" – 4:04
10. "Memento" – 3:47
11. "Shine Inside" – 10:19

Note: The American version of the album features the song "Chimera" after "Shine Inside" as part of the final track (6 minutes and 28 seconds into the track).

== Personnel ==
- Duncan Sheik – vocals, backing vocals, electric piano, harmonium, synthesizers, acoustic guitars, electric guitars
- Patrick Leonard – acoustic piano, electric piano, synthesizers, organs, Moog bass
- Gerry Leonard – electric guitars, mandolin, loops, ambiences, backing vocals (3)
- Jeff Allen – bass
- Doug Yowell – drums (1, 2, 4–11), percussion

Additional musicians

- Mick Jones – high-strung guitar (4)
- Pete Min – siren guitar (6)
- Jay Bellerose – drums (3)
- Duane LaVold – backing vocals (1)
- Neal Casal – backing vocals (9)

The London Session Orchestra (Tracks 2, 5, 10 & 11)

- Simon Hale – arrangements and conductor
- Gavyn Wright – string leader
- Marc Scully – double bass
- David Daniels and Mick Stirling – cello
- Rachel Bolt, Gustav Clarkson and Bruce White – viola
- Rebecca Hirsch, Patrick Kiernan, Boguslaw Kostecki, Julian Leaper, Jackie Shave, Katherine Shave and David Woodcock – violin

== Production ==
- Ron Shapiro – executive producer, A&R
- James Hunter – A&R
- Patrick Leonard – producer arrangements
- Duncan Sheik – co-producer arrangements
- Michele Arifty – personal assistant to Patrick Leonard
- Lisa Marie – representative
- Suzanne Ybarra – representative
- Moir/Marie Entertainment – representation company
- Jim Goodkind – legal affairs
- Loeb & Loeb – legal affairs
- Katrina Leigh – project coordinator
- Lynn Kowalewski – art direction
- Allen Hori – design
- Philippe McClelland – photography

Technical credits

- Stephen Marcussen – mastering at Marcussen Mastering (Hollywood, California)
- Kevin Killen – mixing at Cello Studios (Hollywood, California)
- Michael Tudor – engineer
- Steve Genewick – assistant engineer
- Jimmy Hoyson – assistant engineer
- Katrina Leigh – assistant engineer
- Alan Sanderson – assistant mix engineer
- Tom Jenkins – string recording assistant (2, 5, 10, 11)
- David Channing – digital editing
- Stewart Whitmore – digital editing

Pre-Production Assistance

- James Hunter
- Duane LaVold
- Jack Livesey
- Peter Nashel
- Michael Tudor
