= I Could Be the One (disambiguation) =

"I Could Be the One" is a 2012 single by Avicii and Nicky Romero.

I Could Be the One may also refer to:

- "I Could Be the One" (Donna Lewis song), 1998
- "I Could Be the One" (Stacie Orrico song), 2004
- "I Could Be the One", Marti Webb song from the musical The Card

== See also ==
- Be the One (disambiguation)
- Could You Be the One? (disambiguation)
