= I Could Be the One (Donna Lewis song) =

1998 single by Donna Lewis

Single by Donna Lewis

from the album Blue Planet
- B-side: "Scream"; "No Return"
- Released: 23 June 1998
- Studio: Windgate (Howth, Ireland); Windmill Lane (Dublin, Ireland)
- Genre: Pop
- Length: 3:46
- Label: Atlantic
- Composers: Donna Lewis; Gary Clark
- Lyricist: Donna Lewis
- Producer: Donna Lewis

Donna Lewis singles chronology
"At the Beginning" (1997)	"I Could Be the One" (1998)	"Love Him" (1998)

Music video
- "I Could Be the One" on YouTube

"I Could Be the One" is a song by Welsh singer-songwriter Donna Lewis from her second studio album, Blue Planet (1998). Lewis wrote the lyrics and produced the track alone while composing the music with Scottish musician Gary Clark. Lewis intended the song and album to remove the one-hit wonder tag that she had obtained with her 1996 worldwide hit, "I Love You Always Forever".

Lewis's record label, Atlantic Records, released the song in the United States on 23 June 1998 and in the United Kingdom on 6 July 1998. Several music writers predicted that the song would become a major hit, but it failed to make an impact, stalling at number 99 in the UK and failing to chart in the US. The song found better success in Austria, where it reached number nine, and it also charted in Australia and Germany.

== Background ==
Prior to the song's release, Donna Lewis was a one-hit wonder with her 1996 song "I Love You Always Forever". Speaking to Billboard magazine, Lewis explained that although she was happy with the success of the aforementioned song and its parent album, Now in a Minute, she wanted to show the public that she was capable of writing more hit songs. For her follow-up album, Blue Planet, Lewis decided to replace drum loops with real drums, which "I Could Be the One" utilises courtesy of future Waterboys drummer Ralph Salmins. Lewis wrote the lyrics to the song and produced it herself, and she co-wrote the music with Gary Clark. Additional musicians on the track include Gerry Leonard on guitar, Tony Franklin on bass, and David Lowe handling drum programming. Lewis recorded the song at Windgate in Howth, Ireland, while the drums were recorded at Windmill Lane Studios in nearby Dublin.

== Release ==
"I Could Be the One" was included as the second track on Blue Planet and was issued as the debut single from the album, which was released in the United States on 14 July 1998. Atlantic Records serviced the song to American pop and adult contemporary radio on 29 May 1998, with a physical release following on 23 June of the same year. Although the song was widely expected to become a big hit, it failed to appear on the US Billboard charts. It performed similarly in the United Kingdom, where it stalled at number 99 on the UK Singles Chart in July 1998. In mainland Europe, the single charted in Germany and Austria. Although it reached number 69 in Germany, "I Could Be the One" was a top-10 success in Austria, where it peaked at number nine in October 1998 and spent 12 weeks in the top 40. In Australia, the song reached number 76 on the ARIA Singles Chart.

== Critical reception ==
Reviewing the song on its 20 June 1998 issue, Billboard called "I Could Be the One" a "pleasant li'l pop chugger" and wrote that Lewis's breathy vocals complements the music well, noting its more complex rhythm than typical songs. In a later review of Blue Planet, the magazine called the track "catchy". Reviewing the album on AllMusic, Michael Gallucci referred to the song as "cozily sexy".

== Track listing ==
UK CD and cassette single; Japanese CD single

1. "I Could Be the One" – 3:46
2. "Scream" – 4:04
3. "No Return" – 2:55

== Credits and personnel ==
Credits are lifted from the UK cassette single sleeve and the Blue Planet liner notes.

Studios

- Recorded at Windgate (Howth, Ireland)
- Drums recorded at Windmill Lane Studios (Dublin, Ireland)
- Mastered at Gateway Mastering (Portland, Maine, US)

Personnel

- Donna Lewis – words, music, vocals, keyboards, production
- Gary Clark – music
- Gerry Leonard – guitar
- Tony Franklin – bass
- Ralph Salmins – drums
- David Lowe – drum programming
- Brenda Rotheiser – art direction and design
- BLINKK – photography

== Charts ==
Chart (1998)	Peak position
Australia (ARIA)	76
Austria (Ö3 Austria Top 40)	9
Germany (GfK)	69
UK Singles (OCC)	99

== Release history ==
Region	Date	Format(s)	Label(s)	Ref.
United States	29 May 1998	Pop; adult contemporary radio	Atlantic	
United States	9 June 1998	Contemporary hit radio	Atlantic	
United States	23 June 1998	Commercial	Atlantic	
United Kingdom	6 July 1998	CD; cassette	Atlantic	
Japan	15 August 1998	CD	Atlantic	
