= Phantom Moon =

Studio album by Duncan Sheik
- Released: February 27, 2001
- Recorded: May – October, 2000
- Studios: Sear Sound, TMF Studios and The Looking Glass Studio (New York City, New York); Other Room Music (Seattle, Washington); Angel Recording Studios (London, UK)
- Length: 53:49
- Label: Nonesuch
- Producer: Duncan Sheik

Duncan Sheik chronology
Humming (1998)	Phantom Moon (2001)	Daylight (2002)

Singles from Phantom Moon
- 1. "A Mirror in the Heart" Released: 2001

Professional ratings
Review scores
Source	Rating
AllMusic	4.5/5 stars
Entertainment Weekly	B
People	(favorable)
PopMatters	8/10 stars
The Portland Phoenix	3/4 stars
Q	3/5 stars
Rolling Stone	2.5/5 stars
USA Today	2.5/4 stars
Wall of Sound	(64/100)

Phantom Moon is the third album by American singer-songwriter Duncan Sheik. It was released on Nonesuch Records in 2001.

== Recording ==
The album was a collaboration between Sheik and poet/playwright Steven Sater, who wrote the lyrics for the album. Phantom Moon is considered a tribute of sorts to Nick Drake and his album Pink Moon. The album features contributions from the London Session Orchestra, and from guitarist Bill Frisell. In addition, percussion is very spare, which helped create a mood of contemplation and spirituality that supports the lyrical content.

== Release ==
The album was met with little commercial success, but favorable reviews. Review aggregating website Metacritic reports a normalized score of 76% based on 7 reviews. According to Allmusic, Phantom Moon is "easily Sheik's strongest, and most mature record to date". Rolling Stone wrote that the album "casts a lovely, languid shadow", while The New York Times wrote that it is "an album of moods to set you drifting and dreaming". Entertainment Weekly noted the album's "intimate lamentations", adding, "with one's feet up and headphones on, the strings suddenly shimmer, and the warm vocals soothe".

== Track listing ==
All songs written by Steven Sater & Duncan Sheik.

1. "The Wilderness" (Prelude) – 1:24
2. "Longing Town" – 3:27
3. "Mr. Chess" – 2:38
4. "The Winds That Blow" – 3:04
5. "Mouth on Fire" – 5:37
6. "Sad Stephen's Song" – 6:28
7. "Time and Good Fortune" – 4:43
8. "Far Away" – 4:32
9. "This Is How My Heart Heard" – 4:13
10. "A Mirror in the Heart" – 4:08
11. "Lo and Behold" – 5:13
12. "Requiescat" – 3:58
13. "The Wilderness" – 4:24

== Personnel ==
Musicians

- Duncan Sheik – vocals, acoustic piano (1, 3, 4, 8, 10, 13), harmonium (1, 5, 7, 10, 12), tenor guitar (2), organ (3, 8), guitars (3–7, 9, 10, 12), glockenspiel (7), acoustic guitar (8), bells (12)
- Gerry Leonard – guitars (3–5, 7, 9, 10), dulcimer (6), dobro (6, 8, 12), banjo (7)
- Bill Frisell – electric guitar (8)
- Jeff Allen – double bass (4, 5, 7, 9, 10), acoustic bass (8)
- Matt Johnson – drums (4, 5, 7, 8, 9), tambora (5)
- Mino Cinelu – drums (10), percussion (10)

The London Session Orchestra (Tracks 2, 4–7, 9, 11 & 13)

- Simon Hale – arrangements and conductor
- Mike Hornett – music preparation

Horns and Woodwinds

- Julie Andrews – bassoon
- Nick Rodwell – clarinet
- Andrew Findon – flute
- John Anderson – oboe
- Richard Watkins – French horn

Strings

- Gavyn Wright – concertmaster
- Mary Scully – bass
- Martin Loveday and Anthony Pleeth – cello
- Roger Chase, Garfield Jackson and Bruce White – viola
- Simon Fischer, Patrick Kiernan, Boguslaw Kostecki, Rita Manning, Jackie Shave, Rolf Wilson, David Woodcock and Gavyn Wright – violin

== Production ==
- Robert Hurwitz – executive producer
- Duncan Sheik – producer
- Tommy Krasker – associate producer
- Karina Beznicki – production coordinator
- Uri Djemal – production coordinator
- Karin Meessen – production coordinator
- Gregg Schaufeld – production coordinator
- Gerry Johansson – cover image
- John Gall – design
- Michael Wilson – photography
- David Leinhardt Management – management

Technical credits

- Greg Calbi – mastering at Sterling Sound (New York, NY)
- Kevin Killen – engineer, mixing, recording
- Niall Acott – recording
- Beck Henderer – recording
- Michael Tudor – recording, hard disk engineer
- Ruadhri Cushnan – hard disk engineer
- Tom Jenkins – assistant engineer
- Steve Mazur – assistant engineer
- Todd Parker – assistant engineer
- Tom Dekorte – assistant mix engineer
- Ryoji Hata – assistant mix engineer
- Kevin Reilly – assistant mix engineer
- Steef Van De Gevel – assistant mix engineer
