= Blue Planet (Donna Lewis album) =

Studio album by Donna Lewis
- Released: 14 July 1998
- Studios: Windgate and Windmill Lane Studios (Dublin, Ireland): Studio Pierre Marchand (Montreal, Quebec, Canada)
- Genre: Dream pop
- Label: Atlantic
- Producer: Donna Lewis

Donna Lewis chronology
Now in a Minute (1996)	Blue Planet (1998)	Be Still (2002)

Professional ratings
Review scores
Source	Rating
AllMusic	2.5/5 stars

Blue Planet is the second studio album by Donna Lewis released in 1998. Her single "I Could Be the One" was a top-10 hit in Austria. Released by Atlantic Records, it would the last album that she released with the label.

== Track listing ==
All songs written by Donna Lewis, except where noted.

1. "Will Love Grow" (Lewis, John Allen) – 4:35
2. "I Could Be the One" (Lewis, Gary Clark) – 3:46
3. "Love Him" – 4:16
4. "Blue Planet" – 4:50
5. "Beauty & Wonder" – 3:17
6. "Heaven Sent You" – 7:25
7. "Harvest Moon" – 4:18
8. "Falling" – 4:16
9. "Lay Me Down" – 4:07
10. "Unforgiven" – 2:45
11. "Take Me Home" – 7:17 (includes a hidden instrumental outro track)
12. "10 Holy Nights" (Japanese bonus track) – 6:23

== Personnel ==
- Donna Lewis – vocals, keyboards (1, 2, 5–9), acoustic piano (1, 9, 10), arrangements (3–11), string arrangements (8)
- David Sancious – keyboards (3), acoustic piano (3, 11), additional drum programming (9)
- Gerry Leonard – guitars (1–3, 6–9, 11)
- Gustavo Moratorio – additional guitars (1)
- Bill Dillon – guitars (4)
- Jimmy Smyth – guitars (10)
- Tony Franklin – bass (1, 2, 4–11)
- David Lowe – drum programming (1–3, 6, 7, 9), bass programming (3), spoken vocal (6), keyboard programming (9)
- Ralph Salmins – drums (2, 8, 11)
- Ronald Jones – drums (4)
- Paul Waller – drum programming (5)
- Richard Niles – string conductor (8, 11), string arrangements (11)
- The London Session Orchestra – strings (8, 11)

=== Production ===
- Jennifer Stark – A&R
- Donna Lewis – producer
- Gustavo Moratorio – engineer (1–3, 5–11)
- Pierre Marchand – recording (4)
- Steve Fitzmaurice – mixing
- Robert Cattlemole – mix assistant
- Conal Markey – mix assistant
- Graham Massey – Pro Tools engineer, post-production
- Bob Ludwig – mastering at Gateway Mastering (Portland, Maine)
- Chris Levine – lasers
- Brenda Rotheiser – art direction, design
- Blinkk – photography
- Martin Harris – project management
- Arma Andon, Steven Faragoli and Pure – management
