= That Says It All =

That Says It All may refer to:

- "That Says It All", a track on 1998 Duncan Sheik album Humming
- That Says It All, 1992 album by Jean Stafford
