= Be the One =

Be the One may refer to:

- Be the One (album), a 1989 album by Jackie Jackson
- "Be the One" (BoA song), 2003
- "Be the One" (Dua Lipa song), 2015
- "Be the One" (Moby song), a 2011 EP
- "Be the One" (Pandora song), 2018
- "Be the One" (Poison song), 2000
- "Be the One" (The Ting Tings song), 2008
- "Be the One", a song by Jack Peñate from Everything Is New
- "Be the One", a 2011 song by Lloyd, Trey Songz and Young Jeezy from King of Hearts
- "Be the One", a 2012 song by Ne-Yo from R.E.D.
- "Be the One", a song by Yes from Keys to Ascension
- "Be the One", a song by Jeremy Camp from Restored

== See also ==
- I Could Be the One (disambiguation)
