= White Limousine =

Studio album by Duncan Sheik
- Released: January 26, 2006
- Recorded: 2005
- Studios: Allaire Studios (Shokan, New York); Sneaky Studios (Garrison, New York); Kyserike Station (New York City, New York); Angel Recording Studios (London, UK)
- Length: 55:18
- Label: Zoë Records
- Producer: Duncan Sheik

Duncan Sheik chronology
Daylight (2002)	White Limousine (2006)	Brighter/Later: A Duncan Sheik Anthology (2006)

Singles from White Limousine
- 1. "White Limousine" Released: 2005; 2. "The Dawn's Request" Released: 2005

Professional ratings
Review scores
Source	Rating
About.com	4/5 stars
AllMusic	4/5 stars
Entertainment Weekly	C+
Ink 19	(favorable)
The Music Box	3/5 stars
Spin	(unfavorable)

White Limousine is the fifth album by American singer-songwriter Duncan Sheik. It was released on Zoë Records in 2006.

== Details ==
The album was more political in nature, particularly in the singles "White Limousine" and "Shopping". The album came with a DVD-ROM which included software allowing the listener to remix tracks from the album. An outgrowth of the effort has been a dedicated website for fans to upload remixes of various songs. While there were at least a dozen fan remixes featured, the website was subsequently deactivated.

== Track listing ==
All songs written by Duncan Sheik

1. "Hey Casanova" – 5:12
2. "The Dawn's Request" – 4:25
3. "White Limousine" – 4:38
4. "I Don't Believe in Ghosts" – 3:47
5. "Nothing Fades" – 4:54
6. "Fantastic Toys & Corduroys" – 5:07
7. "Shopping" – 4:55
8. "Star-Field on Red Lines" – 3:44
9. "I Wouldn't Mind" – 3:30
10. "Land" – 5:27
11. "So Gone" – 3:35
12. "Hymn" – 6:04

== Personnel ==
- Duncan Sheik – vocals, acoustic piano (1, 6, 9–11), electric guitars (1, 7, 12), 12-string guitar (2), acoustic guitars (3, 5, 12), tambourine (3), Fender Rhodes (4), hammered dulcimer (4), synthesizers (5, 7), loops (5), backing vocals (5, 7, 12), Wurlitzer electric piano (6), accordion (6), baritone guitar (6), nylon guitar (8, 10, 11), organ (12)
- Fil Kronengold – Fender Rhodes (2), backing vocals (2, 10)
- Gerry Leonard – electric guitars (1–10, 12), loops (3, 4, 6, 10)
- Jeff Allen – electric bass (1–7, 11, 12), synth bass (10)
- Doug Yowell – drums (1–7, 10, 12), percussion (8)
- Jay Bellerose – cocktail drum (1, 7), percussion (1, 3, 4, 7)
- David Poe – backing vocals (2, 3, 10), harmony vocals (3)

The London Session Orchestra (Tracks 2, 6, 8, 9, 11 & 12)

- Simon Hale – string arrangements and conductor
- Gavyn Wright – string leader
- Mary Scully – bass
- Ben Chappell, David Daniels and Martin Loveday – cello
- Rachel Bolt, Gustav Clarkson, Peter Lale and Bruce White – viola
- Peter Hanson, Boguslaw Kostecki, Julian Leaper, Rita Manning, Perry Montague-Mason, Jackie Shave, Cathy Thompson, Gavyn Wright and Warren Zilenski – violin

== Production ==
- Troy Hansbrough – A&R
- Duncan Sheik – producer
- Kevin Killen – recording, mixing
- Steve Price – string engineer (2, 6, 8, 9, 11, 12)
- Doug Yowell – accordion engineer (6)
- Gerry Leonard – additional engineer
- Michael Tudor – additional engineer
- James Stone – assistant string engineer (2, 6, 8, 9, 11, 12)
- Bob Ludwig – mastering at Gateway Mastering (Portland, Maine)
- Duane LaVold – additional production assistance
- David Poe – additional production assistance
- Jeremy Cowart – photography
- Steven Jurgensmeyer – design
- Sarit Melmed – design, illustration
- Jerrod Wilkins for Gold Mountain Entertainment – management
- John Frankenheimer for Loeb & Loeb – legal representation

DVD credits

- Kevin Killen – DVD stems creator
- Craig Perkins – engineer (DVD content in Live)
- Doug Yowell – engineer (DVD content in Live)
