= Alice by Heart =

2012 musical

- Music: Duncan Sheik
- Lyrics: Steven Sater
- Book: Steven Sater; Jessie Nelson
- Basis: Alice's Adventures in Wonderland by Lewis Carroll
- Productions: 2019 Off-Broadway

Alice by Heart is a musical with music by Duncan Sheik, lyrics by Steven Sater, and a book by Sater with Jessie Nelson. Inspired by the 1865 novel Alice's Adventures in Wonderland, the musical was originally presented in 2012 at the Royal National Theatre in London.

== Plot ==
In 1941, following the London Blitz of World War II, the life of teen Alice Spencer is disrupted as she and her best friend Alfred are forced to take shelter in a London Underground tube station. Alfred, suffering from tuberculosis, is quarantined ("West of Words"). Alice urges him to escape with her into their cherished book Alice's Adventures in Wonderland and travel down the rabbit hole to Wonderland. Nurse Cross, who is in charge of keeping everyone safe, rips Alice's book as a punishment for visiting Alfred despite his quarantine. Alice becomes very defiant and declares she knows it "by heart" and will recount the story anyways.

The people hiding in the shelter slowly change into some of the book's characters, and Alfred himself changes into the White Rabbit ("Down the Hole"). During her time in Wonderland, Alice changes parts of the story, such as spending too much time with the White Rabbit and forgetting Chapter 3 ("Still"). She gets teased by not one, but two, Caterpillars who encourage her to smoke with them ("Chillin' the Regrets"). Alice convinces Alfred to join her, and they both become high ("The Key Is"). She then receives advice from the Cheshire Cat; dances the Lobster Quadrille with the White Rabbit ("Those Long Eyes"); is berated for growing up too fast by the Duchess; plays croquet with the Queen of Hearts ("Manage Your Flamingo") and other slight twists on scenes from Alice's Adventures in Wonderland.

Alfred is tired of being the White Rabbit and wants to finish his life as himself, in the bunker with Alice, so he attempts to get her to finish the story early and to help her move on by taunting her as the much less friendly March Hare. She tells him she hates him for getting sick; however, before she can apologize he gets taken to Ward D ("Sick to Death of Alice-ness"). Alice attempts to go to him but is halted by the Jabberwock. The Jabberwock taunts her with claims of insanity and grief. Alice defeats him with thoughts of Alfred. ("Brillig, Braelig").

The Cheshire Cat urges Alice to let Alfred go and face her grief ("Some Things Fall Away"). Alice soon meets Mock Turtles who encourage her to not move on and to live wholly in her grief ("Your Shell of Grief").

Alfred returns, wishing to finish the story with Alice, but Alice, taking the Mock Turtles' advice, pleads with him not to move on. Alfred asks how Alice will grieve him, both of them lamenting what could have been ("Another Room In Your Head"). She tries to kiss him, hoping to contract tuberculosis and die with him. He refuses, resuming the story as the hateful March Hare despite her protests.

During the trial ("Isn't It a Trial"/"Do You Think We Think You're Alice?"), Alice stands up for herself, and finally, Alfred joins her. With the help of Tabatha as the Cheshire Cat, they break out of Wonderland and back into the bunker ("I've Shrunk Enough"). Alfred and Alice realize it's time to say goodbye and close the book ("Still (Reprise)"). They then admit their feelings for each other before Alfred dies ("Afternoon"). The show ends with Alice finally accepting Alfred's death, and trying to be optimistic about life with everyone else in the bunker ("Winter Blooms").

== Development ==
Alice by Heart was originally commissioned in 2012 by the Royal National Theatre in London, and was performed by youth companies around the U.K. The musical was developed as a workshop by Theatre Aspen (Aspen, Colorado) in July 2014. The musical received an additional workshop by MCC Theater in December 2015.

New York Stage and Film & Vassar at the Powerhouse Theater presented a workshop production in July 2018. Director Jessie Nelson noted: “We’re attempting to explore the power of a book and what the story has meant to this girl…”

== Productions ==
MCC Theater company announced Alice by Heart would be part of the inaugural Off-Broadway season of the Newman Mills Theater. Directed by Jessie Nelson, with choreography by Rick and Jeff Kuperman, set design by Edward Pierce, costumes by Paloma Young, and lighting by Bradley King, the production opened February 26, 2019, eventually extending its engagement to close April 7.

The first Spanish production was staged in Buenos Aires in August 2024, directed by Julio Panno.

The first Portuguese adaptation was staged at Teatro Estúdio, São Paulo in July 2025, directed by Gustavo Barchilon, starring Gabi Camisotti as Alice Spencer and Diego Montez as Alfred.

== Musical numbers ==
- "West of Words" – Alice, Alfred, Tabatha & Company
- "Down the Hole" – Alice, Alfred, Company
- "Still" – Alice & White Rabbit
- "Chillin' the Regrets" – Caterpillars, Alice & Company
- "The Key Is" – Alice, White Rabbit, Caterpillars & Company
- "So" – Magpie, Eaglet, Duck, Canary, Dodo & Pigeon°°
- "Those Long Eyes" – Cheshire Cat, Alice & White Rabbit
- "Manage Your Flamingo" – Duchess & Company
- "Sick to Death of Alice-ness" – Mad Hatter, March Hare, Dormouse & Alice
- "Brillig Braelig" – Jabberwock, Alice & Company
- "Some Things Fall Away" – Cheshire Cat
- "Your Shell of Grief" – Mock Turtles & Alice
- "Another Room in Your Head" – Alfred, Alice & Company
- "Isn't It a Trial?" – Queen of Hearts, Caterpillar, & Company
- "Do You Think We Think You're Alice?" – Company
- "I've Shrunk Enough" – Alice, White Rabbit, Queen of Hearts, & Company
- "Still (Reprise)" – Alfred & Alice°
- "Afternoon" – Alice, Alfred & Company
- "Winter Blooms" – Alice, Cheshire Cat & Company
- "Down the Hole (Reprise)" – Company°°

°Not included in the Original Cast Recording

°°Not included in the Original Cast Recording or the current licensed version of the show

== Characters and original cast ==
Character	Theatre Aspen Workshop (2014)	Workshop (2015)	Vassar Workshop (2018)	Off Broadway (2019)	Buenos Aires (2024)
Alice Spencer/Alice	Molly Gordon	Molly Gordon	Molly Gordon	Molly Gordon	Agostina Becco
White Rabbit/Alfred Hallam/March Hare	Mike Faist	Ben Platt	J. Quinton Johnson	Colton Ryan	Valentin Zannelli
Cheshire Cat/Tabatha/Caterpillar 2	Phillipa Soo	Emmy Raver-Lampman	Gizel Jimenez	Nkeki Obi-Melekwe*	Sofia Val
Queen of Hearts/Red Cross Nurse	Nathaly Lopez	Mary Testa	Lesli Margherita	Grace McLean	Micaela Romano
Magpie	Sydney Shepherd	Mary Testa	Lesli Margherita	Grace McLean	Ro Noziglia
King of Hearts/Dr Butridge/Jabberwock/Duck/Mock Turtle	Marrick Smith	David Patrick Kelly	Don Stephenson	Andrew Kober	Hernan Castelli
Mad Hatter/Harold Pudding/Mock Turtle/Pigeon/Knave of Spades	Andrew Mueller	Andrew Mueller	Alex Brightman	Wesley Taylor	Walter Canella
Caterpillar/Angus/Knave of Hearts	Rodney Ingram	Anthony Ramos	Heath Saunders	Heath Saunders	Julian Rubino/Matias Marastoni
Dodgy/Duchess/Dodo/Mock Turtle	Noah Galvin	Noah Galvin	Noah Galvin	Noah Galvin	Angel Hernandez
Dormouse/Nigel/Eaglet/Knave of Clubs	Riley Costello	Riley Costello	Zay Infante	Zay Infante	Nicolas Martinez
Clarissa/Canary/Queen of Diamonds/Mock Turtle	Stephanie Hsu	Ashley Park	Megan Masako Haley	Catherine Ricafort	Barbara Willis

== Reception ==
The Off-Broadway production received mixed reviews. While some praised the visual aspects of the story and some of the performances, many criticized the story, calling it muddled and confusing, and were unable to see the parallels of the London Blitz of World War II and Alice's Adventures in Wonderland. Some critics also gave the show unfavorable comparisons to Spring Awakening, which Sheik and Sater both worked on together.

Ben Brantley of The New York Times stated "The real-world characters are so hastily established and sketchily drawn that there's nothing compelling or surprising in their metamorphoses. It's also hard to grasp any necessary relationship between war-warped London in 1941 and the particulars of Wonderland."

David Cote, of The Observer, drew a comparison with Spring Awakening in his review "The difference: Spring Awakening was a straightforward adaptation of playwright Frank Wedekind's satirical-tragical portrait of hormonal adolescents and hypocritical adults in 19th-century Germany. Sater pared down the text and added his tender, sensual lyrics. Sheik brought his ruminative but groove-smart talent to the table. The result was a potent collision of signifiers-teen rebellion that transcended the historical period through emo rock. Alice By Heart is a more muddled concoction, tangled up in too many layers of reality and fantasy, trauma and whimsy, to deliver its emotional payload."

Matt Windman of amNewYork Metro gave the show two out of four stars and stated, "Although sincerely intended and full of creative touches, Alice by Heart is a disjointed, depressing and bewildering mess. It would be near impossible to follow it without a working knowledge of the source material."

Some reviewers took a more positive approach. Frank Rizzo of Variety praised the performances, stating "The cast is solid, though the peripheral characters are thinly drawn even as their surreal alter egos revel in extravagance. Wesley Taylor has an especially fine time as the Mad Hatter, and Andrew Kober takes on five roles with flair, including King of Hearts and an imposing Jabberwocky. [sic]"

Elysa Gardner of New York Stage Review, in another positive review, described the show as "a darkly whimsical, utterly transporting musical that recalls [Spring] Awakening both in its general focus-on anxious, pining youths who must pay the price for their elders' folly-and the lush, often melancholy but exhilarating beauty of its score."

== Awards and honors ==
=== Off-Broadway production ===
Year	Award Ceremony	Category	Nominee	Result
2019
2019	Drama Desk Awards	Outstanding Choreographer	Rick and Jeff Kuperman	Nominated
2019	Drama Desk Awards	Outstanding Costume Design	Paloma Young	Nominated
2019	Lucille Lortel Awards	Outstanding Choreographer	Rick and Jeff Kuperman	Won
2019	Lucille Lortel Awards	Outstanding Featured Actor in a Musical	Heath Saunders	Nominated
2019	Lucille Lortel Awards	Outstanding Costume Design	Paloma Young	Won
2019	Chita Rivera Awards for Dance and Choreography	Outstanding Choreography	Rick and Jeff Kuperman	Won
2019	Chita Rivera Awards for Dance and Choreography	Outstanding Male Dancer	Zachary Downer	Nominated
2019	Chita Rivera Awards for Dance and Choreography	Outstanding Male Dancer	Wesley Taylor	Won
2019	Chita Rivera Awards for Dance and Choreography	Outstanding Female Dancer	Mia DiLena	Nominated
2019	Chita Rivera Awards for Dance and Choreography	Outstanding Ensemble	MCC Theater	Nominated

=== Other ===
Gretchen Shope won the 2024 Jimmy Award for Best Actress portraying Alice in her high school's production of Alice by Heart.

== Recording ==
An original cast recording was released through Sh-K-Boom Records on June 28, 2019. It peaked at number 5 on the US Cast Albums chart.

== Book ==
A novelization of the same name by Sater was published on February 4, 2020.
