= Covers 80s =

Studio album by Duncan Sheik
- Released: June 7, 2011
- Genres: Rock; pop
- Length: 51:54
- Label: Sneaky/MRI
- Producer: Duncan Sheik

Duncan Sheik chronology
Whisper House (2009)	Covers 80s (2011)	Legerdemain (2015)

Singles from Covers Eighties Remixed
- 1. "Shout" Released: 2012

Covers 80s is the seventh album by American singer/songwriter Duncan Sheik. It was released on Sneaky Records in 2011. The album is composed of covers of songs by British artists originally released in the 1980s.

Singer Holly Brook, who appeared on Sheik's album Whisper House, and Rachael Yamagata, who has toured with Sheik for various concerts, contribute backing vocals throughout this album.

== Reception ==
Professional ratings
Review scores
Source	Rating
AllMusic	2.5/5 stars
Melodic.net	3/5 stars
PopMatters	4/10 stars
Slant Magazine	2/5 stars

The album was released to mixed reviews. National Public Radio said, "No nostalgia here, only genuine feeling, and the challenge to reconsider what might really be worth reviving."

== Track listing ==
1. "Stripped" (Depeche Mode) – 3:39
2. "Hold Me Now" (Thompson Twins) – 4:39
3. "Love Vigilantes" (New Order) – 4:04
4. "Kyoto Song" (The Cure) – 3:53
5. "What Is Love?" (Howard Jones) – 3:58
6. "So Alive" (Love and Rockets) – 4:32
7. "Shout" (Tears for Fears) – 4:44
8. "Gentlemen Take Polaroids" (Japan) – 4:53
9. "Life's What You Make It" (Talk Talk) – 4:33
10. "William, It Was Really Nothing" (The Smiths) – 2:11
11. "Stay" (The Blue Nile) – 5:41
12. "The Ghost in You" (The Psychedelic Furs) – 5:08

== Personnel ==
- Duncan Sheik – vocals, acoustic piano, harmonium, steel-string guitars, nylon guitars, banjo, ukulele, dulcimer, glockenspiel, marimba, tape echo
- Jason Hart – upright piano (7)
- Rachael Yamagata – vocals (1–9)
- Holly Brook – outro vocals (6), acoustic piano (12), backing vocals (12)

=== Production ===
- Duncan Sheik – producer
- Michael Tudor – mixing, mastering
- Tony Yates – design
- Kate Auleta – photography
- Jerrod Wilkins for Gold Mountain Entertainment – management
- John Frankenheimer for Loeb & Loeb – legal representation
