= Legerdemain (album) =

Studio album by Duncan Sheik
- Released: October 9, 2015
- Studios: Sneaky Studios, Garrison, New York, US
- Genre: Electronic
- Length: 69:54
- Label: Sneaky
- Producer: Duncan Sheik

Duncan Sheik chronology
| Covers 80s Remixed (2012) | Legerdemain (2015) | American Psycho (2016) |

It's this album of two parts, the first half of it reflects my kind of renewed excitement about electronic music, and it's really I guess my own strange hybridization of pop song structure with EDM aesthetics. And then the second half of the record is more what I call typical Duncan Sheik self-indulgent art songs and it's more organic, sparse, internal and darker. But the whole thing is like a battery, the first half has a positive charge and the second half has a negative charge but it kind of works together as a whole.

— Sheik on the concept behind Legerdemain

Legerdemain is a 2015 studio album by American singer-songwriter Duncan Sheik. The album has received positive reviews from critics and is a transitional one for Sheik as a songwriter, borrowing from his love of electronic music as well as his work scoring musical theater. The music was written contemporaneously to scoring American Psycho, and is his first album of original popular music in almost a decade and was supported by live performances around his Broadway theatre schedule.

== Reception ==
Editors at AllMusic rated this album 4 out of 5 stars, with critic Stephen Thomas Erlewine writing that while this album "may carry some of the sighing melodicism and soft, hazy surfaces that turned [Sheik] into a AAA smash... [Ledgerdemain] is a... like a hybrid between his Broadway work... and his 2011 salute to the '80s" with the "gravity of a stage production" and new wave music sounds. Jim Allen of NPR's First Listen wrote that there was an "ambition and uncompromising nature" to this music with an "unpredictable nature" that shows that Sheik "cares little about the songs' commercial potential". In Paste, Laura Stanley rated this work a 6.6 out of 10, stating that while "the diverseness of the record is praiseworthy, its immensity is obvious and ultimately fumbles the delivery rather than using sleight of hand as the album title would suggest".

== Track listing ==
All songs written by Duncan Sheik.

1. "Selling Out" – 3:45
2. "Avalanche" – 4:46
3. "Photograph" – 3:33
4. "Birmingham" – 3:31
5. "Sometimes" – 5:04
6. "Hey You" – 4:19
7. "Warning Light" – 4:21
8. "Distant Lovers" – 4:26
9. "Bicycle Thief" – 4:42
10. "Acquaintance" – 3:52
11. "Brutalized" – 5:03
12. "Circling" – 6:05
13. "Summer Mourning" – 5:25
14. "No Happy End" – 3:52
15. "Half a Room" – 4:56
16. "So There" – 2:14

Deluxe edition bonus tracks

17. "After All" – 4:58
18. "Wish for the Sun" – 5:06

== Personnel ==
- Duncan Sheik – vocals, acoustic piano, keyboards, organ, guitars, bass (1-7, 9-16), percussion, marimba, tape echo
- Jason Hart – keyboards
- Milo De Cruz – bass (8)
- Doug Yowell – drums
- Jon Hassell – trumpet (11, 14)
- Alvin Witarsa – violin (16)
- Nyla Durdin – backing vocals

=== Production ===
- Duncan Sheik – producer, additional engineer
- Michael Tudor – additional production, engineer, mixing, mastering
- Mama's Place (Woodstock, New York) – mixing and mastering location
- John Duckworth – creative direction
- Thomas Freeman – creative direction
- Marshall Hudson – album package design
- Stitch – album package design
- Nora Ariffin – cover photography
- Jerrod Watkins for Gold Mountain Entertainment – management
- John Frankenheimer for Loeb & Loeb – legal representation
- Carla Sacks – publicity
- Erica Santucci – publicity
- Samantha Tillman – publicity

== See also ==
- 2015 in American music
- List of 2015 albums
