= Whisper House =

Studio album by Duncan Sheik
- Released: January 27, 2009
- Studios: Sneaky Studios (Garrison, New York); Defiant Recording (New York City, New York); Angel Recording Studios (London, UK)
- Length: 41:59
- Label: RCA Victor (US CD)
- Producer: Duncan Sheik

Duncan Sheik chronology
| White Limousine (2006) | Whisper House (2009) | Covers 80s (2011) |

Singles from Whisper House
- 1. "We're Here to Tell You" Released: 2008; 2. "Earthbound Starlight" Released: January 15, 2009; 3. "Play Your Part" Released: 2009

Professional ratings
Aggregate scores
| Source | Rating |
|---|---|
| Metacritic | (71/100) |
Review scores
| Source | Rating |
| AllMusic | 4/5 stars |
| The A.V. Club | B+ |
| Paste | (7.9/10) |
| PopMatters | 4/10 stars |

Whisper House is the sixth studio album and second musical by American singer-songwriter Duncan Sheik. It was released on RCA Victor in 2009.

== Details ==
The album, Sheik's first in the wake of success from composing music for the Tony Award-winning musical Spring Awakening, contains selections from an original stage musical of the same name, with book and additional lyrics by Kyle Jarrow. The world premiere of the musical occurred January 13, 2010, at San Diego, California's Old Globe Theatre. Directed by Peter Askin, the cast included Arthur Acuna, Holly Brook, Kevin Hoffman, Ted Koch, David Poe, Mare Winningham, and Eric Brent Zutty. Sheik cited influences from part of his childhood spent around Hilton Head, South Carolina, and recalling its iconic lighthouse and the ghost stories he shared there with friends.

== Release ==
The album was met with little commercial success, but favorable reviews. Review aggregating website Metacritic reports a normalized score of 71% based on 4 reviews. The album's first single, "Earthbound Starlight", debuted via the "Pop Candy" blog on USAToday.com. On Sheik's official website, streaming audio was made available for the album's first single, as well as its first and second tracks, in advance of the album release.

== Track listing ==
All songs written by Duncan Sheik, except where noted.

1. "Better to Be Dead" - 4:33
2. "We're Here to Tell You" - 3:55
3. "And Now We Sing" (feat. Holly Brook) - 3:20
4. "The Tale of Solomon Snell" - 4:20
5. "Earthbound Starlight" - 5:01
6. "Play Your Part" (Duncan Sheik, Kyle Jarrow) - 3:34
7. "You've Really Gone and Done It Now" (Sheik, Jarrow) - 3:46
8. "How It Feels" - 4:36
9. "I Don't Believe in You" (Sheik, Jarrow) - 4:28
10. "Take A Bow" (Sheik, Jarrow) - 4:33
11. "The Ghost In You" (iTunes bonus song) - 5:09

== Personnel ==
- Duncan Sheik – vocals, keyboards, guitars, bass
- Gerry Leonard – guitars
- Kevin Garcia – drums, percussion
- Nicholas Bucknall – soprano chalumeau, bass clarinet, Bb clarinet, contrabass clarinet
- John Barclay – trumpet, piccolo trumpet
- Richard Watkins – French horn
- Simon Hale – ghostly wind section arrangements and conductor
- Holly Brook – backing vocals, lead vocals (3)

=== Production ===
- Duncan Sheik – producer
- Michael Tudor – engineer, mixing
- Niall Acott – string recording
- Mat Bartram – string recording assistant
- Greg Calbi – mastering at Sterling Sound (New York, NY)
- Mike Hornett – music preparation
- Roxanne Slimak – creative direction
- Klaus Lyngeled – illustrations
- Jerrod Wilkins for Gold Mountain Entertainment – management
- John Frankenheimer for Loeb & Loeb – legal representation
