= At the Beginning =

1997 song from the film Anastasia

Single by Donna Lewis and Richard Marx

from the album Anastasia: Music from the Motion Picture
- Released: October 21, 1997
- Studio: Sarm West Coast, O'Henry
- Genre: Pop, pop rock
- Length: 3:42
- Label: Atlantic
- Songwriters: Stephen Flaherty; Lynn Ahrens
- Producer: Trevor Horn

Donna Lewis singles chronology
"Love & Affection" (1997)	"At the Beginning" (1997)	"I Could Be the One" (1998)

Richard Marx singles chronology
"Angel's Lullaby" (1997)	"At the Beginning" (1997)	"Days In Avalon" (2000)

Music video
- "At The Beginning" on YouTube

"At the Beginning" is a song by British singer Donna Lewis and American singer Richard Marx, released as the first single from the Anastasia soundtrack. It plays during the end credits of the film. It was released as a CD and cassette single on October 21, 1997, on Atlantic Records.

The song reached No. 45 on the Hot 100 giving Lewis her third Hot 100 hit and Marx his 17th. To date, neither has hit the Hot 100 since "At the Beginning" dropped out. It reached No. 2 on Billboard's Adult Contemporary Chart, but did spend a week at No. 1 on Radio & Records' Adult Contemporary Chart before being knocked out by Celine Dion's "My Heart Will Go On".

The song gave Marx his eighth and most recent number one hit single as a singer. Lewis would not have any further songs that hit any chart.

== Composition ==
The song is a moderate pop ballad.

== Critical reception ==
Filmtracks noted that in addition featuring the two pop reprises of songs in the credits, "the unique entry is the tolerable 'At the Beginning', which seems to have been meant to be the centrepiece of the pop songs but was overshadowed in popularity by the cast song adaptations". The site added: "For soundtrack collectors, the song 'At the Beginning' is interesting in that it included contributions by two composers still on the rise, including piano performances by Anne Dudley and string arrangements by Aaron Zigman, for whom it would be another ten years before his name would be widely known".

Allmusic notes the film "duplicates the Disney formula of balancing big show tunes from the film with re-recorded MOR pop versions of the same song"; despite this being an original song the genre is still MOR pop. Film Score Monthly said "only the Richard Marx-Donna Lewis pairing 'At the Beginning' holds any interest (it's the only original song not performed in the film)". TimeOut described it as "uplifting".

Billboard wrote "the romantic 'At The Beginning' solidly ushers in the soundtrack to Anastasia, with Lewis and Marx proving to be a surprisingly chemical pair. Her waifish voice gracefully flutters around his rock edged grit, while producer Trevor Horn provides a reliably grand and dramatic musical environment. Although this oh-so-charming recording deserves widespread pop play, it will likely begin its radio life at AC, where programmers are often quicker to appreciate such a lushly arranged power ballad".

== Music video ==
A music video for the song features a girl (a live-action version of Anastasia) visiting an old building. Throughout the video, Marx and Lewis are shown performing the song, intercut with scenes from Anastasia. The music video was also added on to some VHS copies of the film.

== Track listing ==
1. "At the Beginning" (album version)
2. "At the Beginning" (instrumental)
3. "At the Beginning" (remix)

== Personnel ==
- Donna Lewis – lead vocals
- Richard Marx – guest vocals, arrangements
- Anne Dudley – piano
- Tim Weidner – keyboards, programmer
- Henry Jackman – keyboards, programmer, strings arrangement
- Tim Pierce – electric guitar
- Randy Jackson – bass
- Niki Harris, Marlena Jeter, Jim Gilstrap and Darryl Phinnessee – backing vocals
- Aaron Zigman – strings arrangement

=== Production ===
- Trevor Horn – production

== Charts ==
=== Weekly charts ===
Chart (1997–1998)	Peak position
Australia (ARIA)	64
Canada Adult Contemporary (RPM)	4
Germany (GfK)	77
US Billboard Hot 100	45
US Adult Contemporary (Billboard)	2
US Radio Songs (Billboard)	60

=== Year-end charts ===
Chart (1998)	Position
Canada Adult Contemporary (RPM)	29
US Adult Contemporary (Billboard)	12
