= In the Pink (Donna Lewis album) =

Studio album by Donna Lewis
- Released: 1 April 2008
- Genre: Pop
- Label: Peruzzi Music
- Producers: Donna Lewis; Simon Duffy; Gerry Leonard

Donna Lewis chronology
Be Still (2002)	In the Pink (2008)

In the Pink is the fourth studio album by singer-songwriter Donna Lewis. It is co-produced by Lewis, Simon Duffy and Gerry Leonard.

== History ==
Lewis met Simon Duffy in Italy in 1999/2000, and in 2002 they began putting tracks together for the album, co-writing the song "Obsession". This process halted for two years after Lewis gave birth to her son. In April 2005 she met with guitarist Gerry Leonard, who had played on her first two albums and was on a break from touring. She played him the songs that had been recorded so far and asked if he would co-produce. Leonard agreed and enlisted drummer Doug Yowell and bassist Jeff Allan; other musicians who contributed include Jay Belarose, Robert Bell of the band The Blue Nile, Harvey Jones, Tony Levin and David Torn. Lewis said working with Leonard was "an absolute Joy ... his production input has brought an organic sense to the record that wouldn't have been there without him."

Recording was completed in eight weeks, after which Lewis and Leonard took a break. Mixing began with Kevin Killen, who mixed Lewis's debut album, and Hector Castillo, who mixed one song on In the Pink; Lewis said Killen "has fantastic ears and a great vocal sensibility — he really has done an amazing job". She has said the album is the first of hers she enjoys listening to. By April 2006, the packages had been put together and Lewis's management team were negotiating with which record label partners. It was finally released on April 1, 2008 on Lewis' own Peruzzi Music, with distribution through Redeye Distribution.

Four songs featured on In the Pink — "Shout", "Shut the Sun Out", "You to Me" and "Obsession" — were uploaded to Lewis's official MySpace page in April 2007. Before this, in July 2006, "Shout" was leaked onto radio in Indonesia, where it garnered substantial airplay without being released as a single.

== Track listing ==
1. "Ireland" – 4:34
2. "Pink Dress" – 4:07
3. "Shout" – 3:27
4. "Shut the Sun Out" – 3:44
5. "Kick Inside" – 4:28
6. "You to Me" – 3:38
7. "Obsession" – 3:34
8. "Don't Ever" – 5:16
9. "1000 Miles" – 3:58
10. "You (Reprise)" – 0:49
11. "Sandcastles" – 4:01
12. "I Love You Always Forever" (re-recording, bonus track) - 4:04
