= Steven Sater =

American lyricist

- Born: Evansville, Indiana, United States
- Education: Washington University in St. Louis; Princeton University
- Occupations: Playwright, lyricist, screenwriter

Steven Sater is a Tony Award, Grammy Award, and Laurence Olivier Award-winning American playwright, lyricist, and screenwriter. He is best known for writing the book and lyrics for the Tony Award-winning 2006 Broadway musical Spring Awakening.

== Early life and education ==
Born in Evansville, Indiana, Sater is a summa cum laude graduate of Washington University in St. Louis. While in college, Sater was forced to jump from his balcony to escape a fire in his apartment. He suffered serious burns, broke multiple vertebrae, and other limbs. The months spent recovering from his injuries and burns inspired Sater to teach himself Ancient Greek and pursue the arts. He continued his studies and received a master's degree in English literature from Princeton University.

After completing his graduate program, Sater took a position with a New York City literary agent but continued to write plays on the side. It was during this time that he joined the Soka Gakkai International, a Nichiren Buddhist organization. His membership proved important to his life beyond spirituality, as it brought Sater together with his future spouse as well as Duncan Sheik, his future creative partner.

== Career ==
=== Stage ===
Soon after meeting in 1999, Sater collaborated with Sheik on his play Umbrage, with Sheik providing the music for Sater's lyrics. For Sheik's third studio album, Phantom Moon, Sater provided all of the lyrics, and Sheik set them musically. After extensively revisiting the work to incorporate the music, the play was produced again in 2013 under the new title Arms on Fire.

==== Spring Awakening ====
Sater and Sheik continued their stage work with Spring Awakening, a musical interpretation of German playwright Frank Wedekind's play of the same name. In 2007, Sater won two Tony Awards for his work on Spring Awakening. He won the Tony Awards for Best Book and Best Musical Score, the Drama Desk Award for Outstanding Lyrics, and the Outer Critics Circle Award for Best Lyrics. The pair received the 2007 Grammy Award for Best Musical Show Album and, in addition, The Dramatists Guild Hull-Warriner Award, the Outer Critics Circle Award, the Drama Desk, the Lucille Lortel, New York Drama Critics' Circle, the Drama League Award, and the 2008 Critics' Circle Theatre Award and Laurence Olivier Awards for Best Musical. Spring Awakening has had two national tours and international productions in over 49 countries, including Australia, Sweden, Japan, Israel, Serbia, Brazil, Korea, Argentina, Norway, Russia, and Great Britain (in London, at the Lyric Hammersmith and Novello Theatres). Productions were scheduled for eighteen countries around the world throughout Europe, Asia, and South America.

After receiving numerous requests to discuss the poetry of the Spring Awakening lyrics, Sater undertook writing a companion book on the subject. Entitled A Purple Summer: Notes on the Lyrics of Spring Awakening, it was published by Applause Books in February, 2012. The book has been widely read and has proven to be an invaluable resource for subsequent casts who have performed the show all around the world.

In September 2014, Deaf West Theatre mounted a production in Los Angeles directed by Michael Arden at Inner-City Arts, which subsequently transferred to the Wallis Annenberg Center for the Performing Arts. The cast, made up of both deaf and hearing actors, performed the show simultaneously in American Sign Language and English. The concept was first brought to Arden by his fiancé, first National Tour cast-member Andy Mientus. The production then transferred to Broadway in the fall of 2015, garnering three Tony Award nominations: Best Direction, Best Lighting Design, and Best Revival of a Musical. The cast also performed at the White House during the Obama administration in 2015.

==== Alice by Heart ====
In 2010, Sater and Sheik began workshopping Alice by Heart with a group of students from Harvard-Westlake School in Los Angeles, including Molly Gordon, Ben Platt, Beanie Feldstein, Jack Quaid, Darren Criss, and Kathryn Gallagher. In 2011, Sater and Sheik received a commission from the Royal National Theatre: Connections to further their work on the musical, which is inspired by Lewis Carroll's Alice's Adventures in Wonderland and tells the story of Alice Spencer, a young girl seeking refuge with her quarantined and ailing friend Alfred Hallam, in her reimagining of Wonderland and also in the physical world of a battered Tube Station during the Blitz of World War II. The show received multiple productions at UK regional theatres and a performance at London's National Theatre. In the US, Alice by Heart was workshopped with Theatre Aspen in 2014, featuring Molly Gordon, Mike Faist, Noah Galvin, and Phillipa Soo. In 2015, MCC Theater produced a workshop featuring Molly Gordon, Ben Platt, Ashley Park, Anthony Ramos, and Mary Testa.

After a final workshop at New York Stage and Film in 2018, MCC mounted an off-Broadway production of Alice by Heart as its first musical in its new Robert W. Wilson MCC Theater Space. The production featured Molly Gordon, Colton Ryan, Wesley Taylor, Noah Galvin, Grace McLean, Andrew Kober, and Heath Saunders. The production was directed by Jessie Nelson and won Lucille Lortel Awards for outstanding choreography for Rick and Jeff Kuperman and outstanding costume design for Paloma Young. Heath Saunders was nominated for outstanding featured actor in a musical. The production was also nominated for five Chita Rivera Awards, winning two for outstanding male dancer for Wesley Taylor. It was also nominated for Drama Desk Awards for outstanding choreographer and outstanding costume design. The cast album from the off-Broadway production was released by Ghostlight Records on streaming services on June 28, 2019, and the physical CD was released on October 25, 2019.

In the meantime, Sater was also adapting the musical as a novel. On February 4, 2020, Razorbill published Sater's novel to excellent reviews, terming it, "an extraordinary blend of historical fiction and Lewis Carroll’s timeless classic." It quickly became a best-selling theater book on Amazon.

==== Other works with Duncan Sheik (2008-present) ====
===== Nero =====
Sater and Sheik also collaborated on Nero, an eponymous musical based on the Roman emperor, which debuted in 2006 at the Magic Theatre in San Francisco, featuring a book and lyrics by Sater and music by Sheik. The project was subsequently workshopped with New York Stage and Film at Vassar College in July 2008, starring Idina Menzel, Lea Michele, Jeffrey Carlson, and Michael Arden, under the direction of Daniel Kramer. It was workshopped again in 2015 at Carnegie Mellon University's School of Drama and Pittsburgh CLO, under the direction of Ed Iskandar.

===== The Nightingale =====
Sater and Sheik also worked on a musical adaptation of the Hans Christian Andersen story "The Nightingale". The piece, also called "The Nightingale", was presented in a Page to Stage production at La Jolla Playhouse in summer 2012 (directed by Moises Kaufman and produced by Dodgers Theatricals). The show was previously workshopped at the O'Neill Musical Theatre Conference, La Jolla Playhouse, American Conservatory Theater, New York Theatre Workshop, and New York Stage and Film.

===== Ma Vie en Rose =====
Sater and Sheik are currently developing a stage musical adaption of the 1995 Golden Globe-winning film Ma Vie en Rose, which tells the story of a seven-year old trans girl and the challenges she and her family face after she comes out in their provincial Belgian town. Sater and Sheik developed the piece at Sundance Mass MoCA in December 2016. In the fall of 2019, Ken Davenport produced two staged readings, under the direction of Leigh Silverman.

==== Further Stage Works ====
===== Prometheus Bound =====
Sater has worked with System of a Down's Serj Tankian on a musical version of Aeschylus's tragedy, Prometheus Bound, directed by Diane Paulus, which opened at the American Repertory Theater on March 4, 2011, to good reviews. The production featured Gavin Creel, Lea DeLaria, Uzo Aduba, and Lena Hall. The A.R.T. partnered with Amnesty International on Prometheus Bound, dedicating each performance to a different prisoner of conscience around the world. "The Hunger", a single from the show recorded by Shirley Manson, has been released on iTunes, with all proceeds going to Amnesty International. Serj Tankian also recorded two songs from the show, "Weave On" and "Tyrant's Gratitude" for his album Harakiri.

===== Some Lovers =====
Sater has been working on a new musical with Burt Bacharach, entitled Some Lovers, based on the short story The Gift of the Magi by O. Henry. It is Bacharach's first new score for the theater since Promises, Promises in 1968. The musical had its regional premiere at The Old Globe in November 2011, a concert at Lincoln Center in 2016, a production at The Other Palace in London in 2017, and a subsequent production in 2018 at the Adirondack Theatre Festival. British vocalist Rumer recorded "Some Lovers" as a single from the show as a part of her album Sings Bacharach at Christmas, which also featured Bacharach's "Alfie". Dionne Warwick also recorded a single from the show, "This Christmas".

===== Murder at the Gates =====
There have been multiple workshops of a musical Sater is developing with British pop-rock star James Bourne named Murder at the Gates. Workshops have taken place with the Huntington Theatre Company, at the New York University Tisch School of the Arts in New York City, Pace University, and The Other Palace in London. The workshop at The Other Palace was the first of these workshops to be presented in front of a paying audience.

=== Film and television ===
Sater is in the process of creating an untitled new original musical series for streaming, based on the Shakespeare play Twelfth Night. Produced by Ryan Seacrest Productions, with a pilot directed by Marc Webb, the show, co-written with Lauren Gussis, will tell an original non-binary love story. Sater has also co-created and executive produced, with Paul Reiser, pilots for both NBC and FX, and has developed two projects for HBO, and another for Showtime. He has also worked on two feature films with Jessie Nelson. In 2010, he completed a draft for Sony Pictures' remake of Chitty Chitty Bang Bang.

The film version of Spring Awakening is currently in active development with Playtone.

In the television series 90210, the first few episodes contain the school and some of the characters as they prepare, and eventually perform in Spring Awakening, though in reality the amateur production rights were not available at the time. Parts of some songs and scenes are performed through the episodes, such as "Mama Who Bore Me" and "The Bitch of Living". Annie and Ty played the principal roles.

Rise, a television show that premiered March 13, 2018, on NBC, focuses on a high school English teacher turned theater director mounting a production of Spring Awakening, while facing intense resistance from members of the community – including parents of cast members – who consider the material inappropriate for teenagers. Sater and Sheik composed a new song for the show, titled "All You Desire".

=== Music ===
Sater works as a lyricist with various composers in the pop/rock world, including Burt Bacharach, Michael Bublé, Bryan Adams, Desmond Child, Andreas Carlsson, Johnny Mandel, Leo Z, and Bryan Todd. Sater wrote two songs with Sheik for Michael Mayer's feature film A Home at the End of the World as well as the independent features Brother's Shadow and Mary Stuart Masterson's The Cake Eaters. He also co-wrote a song with Michael Bublé, Bryan Adams, and Alan Chang, entitled "After All".

Further recorded songs include: "Trash" (Play), "Ragdoll" (Lucy Woodward), "Some Lovers" (Rumer), "Come In Ogni Ora" (Karima, Burt Bacharach), "Just Walk Away" (Karima, Burt Bacharach), "Something That Was Beautiful" (Mario Biondi), "The Hunger" (Shirley Manson, Serj Tankian), "Another Heaven" (Yisabel Jo), "Another Silent Christmas Song" (Jessica Sanchez and Christian Bautista).

=== Literature ===
On February 4, 2020, Sater released Alice by Heart, his debut novel. Alice by Heart is a young-adult adaptation of his off-Broadway musical of the same name. It was published by the Razorbill imprint of Penguin Random House. Alice by Heart was the best-selling Theater Book on Amazon for weeks following its release.

== Awards and nominations ==
Year	Award	Work	Category	Result
2007	Outer Critics Circle Award	Spring Awakening	Outstanding Broadway Musical	Won
2007	Outer Critics Circle Award	Spring Awakening	Outstanding New Score	Won
2007	Drama Desk Award	Spring Awakening	Outstanding Musical	Won
2007	Drama Desk Award	Spring Awakening	Outstanding Book of a Musical	Nominated
2007	Drama Desk Award	Spring Awakening	Outstanding Lyrics	Won
2007	Tony Award	Spring Awakening	Best Book of a Musical	Won
2007	Tony Award	Spring Awakening	Best Original Score	Won
2008	Grammy Award	Spring Awakening	Best Musical Theater Album	Won
2010	Laurence Olivier Award	Spring Awakening	Best New Musical	Won
