= Duncan Sheik (album) =

Studio album by Duncan Sheik
- Released: May 20, 1996
- Studios: Précy-sur-Oise, France; Metropolis Studios (London, England)
- Genres: Pop; folk-pop
- Length: 52:08
- Label: Atlantic
- Producer: Rupert Hine

Duncan Sheik chronology
Duncan Sheik (1996)	Humming (1998)

Singles from Duncan Sheik
- 1. "Barely Breathing" Released: May 3, 1996; 2. "She Runs Away" Released: January 14, 1997; 3. "Reasons for Living" Released: December 2, 1997

Duncan Sheik is the debut studio album by American singer-songwriter Duncan Sheik. It was released on May 20, 1996, through Atlantic Records. Three singles were released from the album: "Barely Breathing", "She Runs Away" and "Reasons for Living". The album was certified Gold by the Recording Industry Association of America (RIAA) on August 27, 1997, denoting sales of over 500,000 copies in the United States.

== Recording ==
Sheik recorded around 30 songs for this album with the producer Rupert Hine while working out a deal with Atlantic (who took over his previous contract from Immortal Records), which left around 18 tracks unheard from these sessions. The only outtake from the album which saw the light, "View from the Other Side", was released as a B-side in 1997.

== Release ==
The album was met with commercial success and was Gold-certified. It includes the Grammy-nominated hit single "Barely Breathing", which stayed on the Billboard Hot 100 singles chart for a record-breaking 55 (consecutive) weeks.

== Critical reception ==
Professional ratings
Review scores
Source	Rating
AllMusic	4.5/5 stars
Entertainment Weekly	C+
Rolling Stone	4/5 stars
USA Today	3.5/4 stars
The Village Voice	C

Kelly McCartney of AllMusic said the album is more than just the single "Barely Breathing", praising Sheik's songwriting for being "richly melodic and thoughtful" and Hine's production for giving the stories life throughout the track listing and multiple emotions that can be interpreted by the listeners, concluding that there is "something for everybody and a great record all around". James Hunter from Rolling Stone noted how Sheik's musicianship emulated UK acts like Talk Talk and the Smiths, concluding, "He may be enamored of antique pop, but Sheik is never merely retro. This [album] is a defiant debut – beautiful and benevolent of spirit." Entertainment Weekly writer Steven Mirkin felt that Sheik's vocal performance was too restrained to allow for any "real emotional commitment" for the listeners to get out of the generic lyrics. The Village Voice critic Robert Christgau dismissed Sheik as a second-rate "matinee idol" and "a whiner stupid enough to fall for the depressed wacko" and "stupid enough to blame it entirely on her", in reference to "Barely Breathing".

== Track listing ==
All tracks are written by Duncan Sheik, except where noted.

No.	Title	Writer(s)	Length
1.	"She Runs Away"		3:43
2.	"In the Absence of Sun"		5:05
3.	"Barely Breathing"		4:15
4.	"Reasons for Living"		4:31
5.	"Days Go By"		4:48
6.	"Serena"	Sheik; Fran Banish	4:43
7.	"Out of Order"		4:30
8.	"November"		4:56
9.	"Home"		4:48
10.	"The End of Outside"		4:45
11.	"Little Hands"	Sheik; Banish	6:04
Total length:			52:08

Japanese bonus track
No.	Title	Writer(s)	Length
12.	"Fake Plastic Trees" (Radiohead cover)	Radiohead

== Personnel ==
Adapted credits from the liner notes of Duncan Sheik.

Musicians

- Duncan Sheik – lead vocals (1–3, 6, 10), harmony vocals (1–3), acoustic guitars (1, 3, 5, 7, 8, 10, 11), electric guitars (1, 3, 6, 7, 10), acoustic piano (3, 4, 7), EBow guitar (3), samples (3), vocals (4, 5, 7–9, 11), keyboard programming (4), drum programming (4–6, 9, 10), organ (6, 8), electric rhythm guitar (6), 12-string guitar (6), backing vocals (6, 10), accordion (9), nylon string guitar (9), keyboards (11)
- Howard Jones – outro acoustic piano (4)
- Fran Banish – electric guitars (1, 9), slide guitar (1), ambient slide guitar (3), lead guitar (6, 10)
- Pino Palladino – bass (1–3, 7)
- Milo DeCruz – bass (6, 10)
- Jean-Michel Biger – drums (1–3, 6, 7)
- Rupert Hine – percussion (1, 3, 6), backing vocals (3, 10), keyboards (9)
- Ruadhri Cushnan – infinite reverbs (9)
- The London Session Orchestra – strings (1, 2, 5, 8, 10)
- Simon Hale – string arrangements and conductor (1, 2, 5, 8, 10)
- Gavyn Wright – string leader (1, 2, 5, 8, 10)

Production

- Tim Sommer – A&R
- Rupert Hine – producer
- Ruadhri Cushnan – recording
- Stephen W. Tayler – recording, mixing
- Minnie Matt – string recording (1, 2, 5, 8, 10)
- Cyrille de Smet – recording assistant
- Gareth Ashton – mix assistant
- Tony Cousins – mastering at Metropolis Mastering (London, UK)
- Julian Broad – photography
- Richard Bates – art direction
- Allen Hori – design
- David Leinheardt – management

== Certifications ==
Region	Certification	Certified units/sales
United States (RIAA)	Gold	500,000^{^}
^{^} Shipments figures based on certification alone.
