= Now in a Minute =

Studio album by Donna Lewis
- Released: 7 May 1996
- Studios: Shelter Island (New York City, New York); Unique (New York City, New York); BBC Pebble Mill (Birmingham, England); Third Story (Philadelphia, Pennsylvania)
- Genre: Dream pop
- Length: 45:51
- Label: Atlantic
- Producers: Donna Lewis; Kevin Killen

Donna Lewis chronology
Now in a Minute (1996)	Blue Planet (1998)

Singles from Now in a Minute
- 1. "I Love You Always Forever" Released: 16 April 1996; 2. "Without Love" Released: 12 November 1996; 3. "Mother" Released: 1997

Professional ratings
Review scores
Source	Rating
AllMusic	3/5 stars
Robert Christgau	(dud)
Music Week	4/5 stars

Now in a Minute is the debut studio album by British singer-songwriter Donna Lewis, released in 1996. The album is best known for the single "I Love You Always Forever", which broke the airplay record in the United States for exceeding one million spins on radio, becoming the most-played single up to that point. Two other singles were released from the album, "Without Love" and "Mother".

A 25th anniversary edition, including the same tracks as the original CD, was released on vinyl in the United States on 2 April 2021. Subsequently, an expanded edition of the album, including remixes and B-sides, was released on digital platforms on the album's exact 25th anniversary, 7 May 2021.

== Track listing ==
All tracks are written by Donna Lewis, except where noted.

No.	Title	Lyrics	Music	Length
1.	"Without Love"	Dave Taylor	Lewis	3:41
2.	"Mother"			4:34
3.	"I Love You Always Forever"			4:00
4.	"Nothing Ever Changes"			4:26
5.	"Simone"			4:26
6.	"Love & Affection"			3:55
7.	"Agenais"			4:12
8.	"Fool's Paradise"			4:01
9.	"Lights of Life"			4:51
10.	"Silent World"			2:52
11.	"I Love You Always Forever" (Philly remix)			4:41

2021 expanded edition
No.	Title	Lyrics	Music	Length
12.	"Don't Ask"			1:53
13.	"Pink Chairs"			3:26
14.	"Have You Ever Loved"			3:33
15.	"I Love You Always Forever" (Sylk 130 edit)			4:40
16.	"Without Love" (radio edit long version)	Taylor	Lewis	3:26
17.	"Simone" (lullaby version)			2:53
18.	"Beauty & Wonder"			2:44
19.	"Mother" (remix)			3:54
20.	"Fool's Paradise" (radio edit)			3:50
21.	"Fool's Paradise" (Tevendale's Tunnel Mix)			8:05
22.	"Fool's Paradise" (Donnapella)			3:36
23.	"I Love You Always Forever" (Sylk 130 remix)			9:00
24.	"I Love You Always Forever" (Sylk 130 instrumental)			5:00
25.	"I Love You Always Forever" (drumapella)			5:12

== Credits ==
Credits for Now in a Minute are adapted from the liner notes.

- Donna Lewis – vocals, keyboards (1–9), acoustic piano (2–5, 10), Omnichord (2), music box (2), programming (3, 5, 9), string arrangements (5, 7)
- Mark Hutchins – additional keyboards (1, 4, 6), percussive scissors (1)
- Harvey Jones – Prophet-5 (1, 4–6, 9), atmospheric keyboards (3), Mellotron flutes (5), keyboards (6)
- Gerry Leonard – electric guitar (1), acoustic guitar (1, 2), EBow (2), guitars (3, 4, 6, 8), classical guitar (9)
- Bill Dillon – guitars (1)
- Tony Franklin – bass (1–9)
- Jimmy Bralower – drum programming (1–6, 8, 9)
- Dean Sharp – drum programming (1, 6)
- Bass Cowboy - Bass
- Peter Keppler – music box (2)
- Eric Friedlander – cello (5, 7)
- A James - drums/programming
- Kevin Killen – Omnichord (8)
- Cosmic Lounge Brass Ensemble – horns (11)

=== Production ===
- Jennifer Stark – A&R
- Donna Lewis – producer, arrangements, mixing (3)
- Kevin Killen – producer, engineer, mixing (1, 2, 4–10)
- Jimmy Bralower – mixing (3)
- Tim Leitner – mix engineer (3)
- Ian Rae – recording (10)
- Peter Keppler – additional engineer, assistant engineer, mix assistant (1, 2, 4–10)
- Carl Glanville – additional assistant engineer
- Ed Miller – assistant mix engineer (3)
- King Britt – remixing (11)
- John Wicks – remixing (11)
- Bob Ludwig – mastering at Gateway Mastering (Portland, Maine)
- Martin Harris – project coordinator
- Brenda Rotheiser – art direction, design
- Norman Jean Roy – photography
- Nancy Sprague – hair, make-up
- Kym Cantor – stylist
- Grainne Fitzpatrick - chef

== Charts and certifications ==
=== Weekly charts ===
Chart (1996)	Peak position
Australian Albums (ARIA)	47
Canada Top Albums/CDs (RPM)	17
German Albums (Offizielle Top 100)	66
Swiss Albums (Schweizer Hitparade)	43
UK Albums (Official Charts)	52
US Billboard 200	31

=== Year-end charts ===
Chart (1996)	Position
US Billboard 200	155
Chart (1997)	Position
US Billboard 200	157

== Certifications ==
Region	Certification	Certified units/sales
Canada (Music Canada)	Platinum	100,000^{^}
United States (RIAA)	Platinum	1,000,000^{^}
^{^} Shipments figures based on certification alone.
