= Be Still (Donna Lewis album) =

Studio album by Donna Lewis
- Released: 2002
- Genre: Folk
- Length: 36:50
- Label: Peruzzi
- Producers: Kevin Killen and Donna Lewis

Donna Lewis chronology
Blue Planet (1998)	Be Still (2002)	In the Pink (2008)

Professional ratings
Review scores
Source	Rating
babysue	5/6 stars

Be Still is the third studio album by Donna Lewis. The album is only available for purchase from her website. The first two tracks were re-released with different arrangements on her fourth studio album, In the Pink.

== Track listing ==
1. "Ireland" – 3:45
2. "Pink Dress" – 3:29
3. "Nowhere to Run" – 4:27
4. "Hands" – 3:27
5. "Sixth Sense" – 4:39
6. "Blutides" – 3:52
7. "After The Fire" – 3:31
8. "Fearless" – 2:52
9. "Moonbeam" – 4:23
10. "Be Still" – 2:30
