= Donna Lewis =

Welsh singer

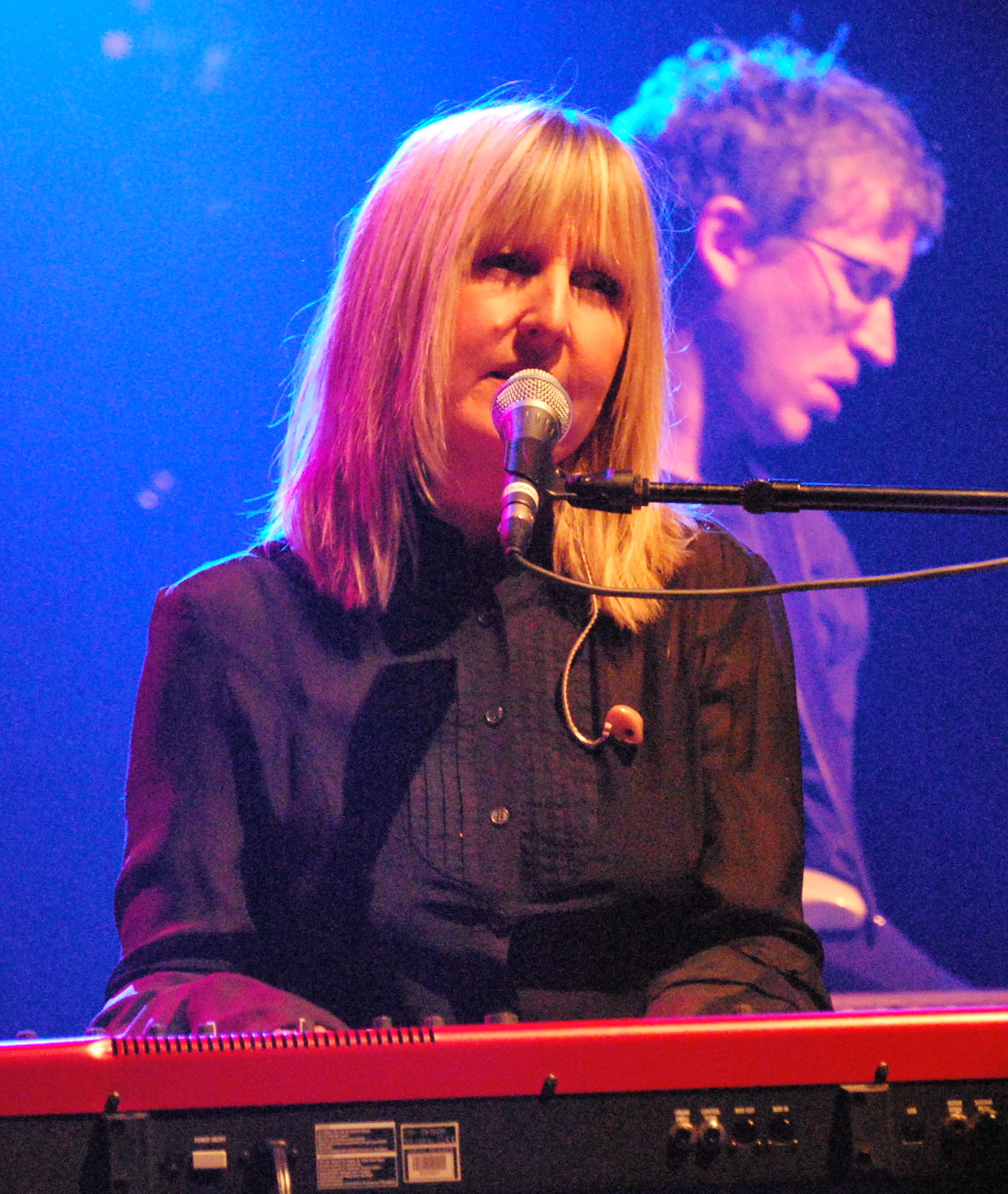
- Lewis at the Highline Ballroom in 2009
- Born: Donna Marie Lewis; Cardiff, Wales, United Kingdom
- Education: Royal Welsh College of Music & Drama
- Occupation: Singer
- Years active: 1990s–present
- Spouse: Martin Harris
- Children: 1
- Musical career
- Genres: Pop; dream pop; dance-pop; folk
- Instruments: Vocals; piano; keyboards
- Label: Atlantic
- Website: www.donnalewis.com

Donna Lewis is a Welsh singer from Cardiff, Wales. She is best known for the 1996 pop hit single "I Love You Always Forever". Lewis teamed up with Richard Marx on the 1997 adult contemporary hit "At the Beginning" for the Anastasia soundtrack. In 1997, Lewis was nominated for the Brit Award for Best British Female Artist.

After releasing her second studio album, Blue Planet (1998), Lewis left Atlantic Records and independently released albums Be Still (2002) and In the Pink (2008). Her album Brand New Day was produced by David Torn and featured Ethan Iverson, Reid Anderson and Dave King.

== Biography ==
There are conflicting accounts online regarding Lewis's birth date. According to her biography on the AllMusic and All About Jazz websites, written by employees of Rovi, and her BBC page, she was born on 6 August 1973.

An article in People from November 1996 presents a different timeline of these events. It states that Lewis's graduation from the Royal Welsh College took place in 1979 and that she played in piano bars throughout Britain and Europe for a period of five years, so like many people in the public eye, there may have been attempts to make her age appear younger than she really is. In November 1996, she had been married for ten years to her road manager and "[gave] her age as in her 30s". This information, if correct, would imply that she was born between 1957 and 1966. This is roughly consistent with a statement Lewis made in an interview in 2015: "When I was in the pop world [...], I wasn't a 19 year old—I was 30 or something like that." The context suggests that this refers to the time when she got her Atlantic record deal. The biography on Lewis's own website does not date events prior to 1996. An article in Entertainment Weekly from September 1996 states that Lewis "won't reveal her age—she and her husband/manager, Martin Harris, have been married for nine years, so 'you know I'm not 21'". According to Companies House records for 'Donna Lewis Limited', of which both Donna Lewis ('Singer Songwriter') and her husband Martin Harris ('Business Manager') were directors, she was born in August 1959.

Lewis began playing the piano at the age of six. Her father, an amateur jazz pianist and guitarist lent encouragement, and at 14, she began composing original songs. Her formal training was at the Royal Welsh College of Music and Drama in Cardiff, where she majored in classical composition for piano and flute. Lewis then taught music for a year in Sussex before moving to Birmingham to sing in a bar band. During that time she set up a home studio and began recording demos. She became a popular live attraction and circa 1993 began sending her demos to record labels. Atlantic Records signed her in 1994.

In 1996, Atlantic Records released Lewis's first single, "I Love You Always Forever", a love song which was a hit on VH1. It was also successful on U.S. radio, staying at No. 2 on the Billboard Hot 100 for nine consecutive weeks, and spending 13 consecutive weeks at No. 1 on the airplay chart. It exceeded one million "spins" on radio, to claim its place in music industry history as the most-played single up to that point. The single reached No. 5 on the UK Singles Chart in 1996, and spent 14 weeks in the chart. It helped her debut album, Now in a Minute, to No. 31 in the U.S. Billboard 200 chart, and No. 52 in the UK Albums Chart. It was certified platinum in the U.S.

Lewis recorded "At the Beginning" with Richard Marx for the 1997 film Anastasia. Her second LP, Blue Planet (1998), won critical acclaim, but it was largely overlooked by the public. Although it produced a minor hit in continental Europe and Asia, "I Could Be the One", and a U.S. No. 1 dance single, "Love Him", Lewis parted ways with Atlantic Records and independently produced her third LP, Be Still (2002), which featured her on an almost entirely acoustic set. During the early 2000s, Lewis was featured as a guest vocalist on several trance music/house music recordings. Her fourth LP, In the Pink, was released in 2008; its first single was "Shout," which was included in the soundtrack to the Marian Quinn film 32A. Lewis also sang lead vocals for her side project, Chute, which released their debut EP in April 2010. In March 2015, she released Brand New Day, her first full-length LP in nearly a decade.

== Personal life ==
Lewis is married to Martin Harris, who is also her business manager. She resides in Boiceville, New York and has one son.

== Discography ==
=== Studio albums ===
Title	Details	Peak chart positions						Certifications (sales threshold)
Title	Details	UK	AUS	AUT	GER	SWI	US	Certifications (sales threshold)
Now in a Minute	Release date: 7 May 1996; Label: Atlantic; Formats: CD, cassette	52	47	—	66	43	31	MC: Platinum; RIAA: Platinum
Blue Planet	Release date: 14 July 1998; Label: Atlantic; Formats: CD, cassette	—	—	33	—	—	—	
Be Still	Release date: 15 June 2002; Label: Peruzzi Music; Formats: CD, cassette	—	—	—	—	—	—	
In the Pink	Release date: 1 April 2008; Label: Peruzzi Music; Formats: CD, digital download	—	—	—	—	—	—	
Brand New Day	Release date: 10 March 2015; Label: Palmetto; Formats: CD, digital download	—	—	—	—	—	—	
Rooms with a View with Holmes Ives	Release date: 26 April 2024; Label: Self-released; Formats: Digital download	—	—	—	—	—	—	
Wanderlust with David Lowe	Release date: 8 May 2026; Label: Aztec Records; Formats: Digital download, CD, LP	—	—	—	—	—	—	
"—" denotes releases that did not chart

=== Singles ===
Title	Year	Peak chart positions										Certifications	Album
Title	Year	UK	AUS	AUT	CAN	GER	NZ	NOR	SWI	US	US Pop	Certifications	Album
"I Love You Always Forever"	1996	5	2	3	3	7	9	3	6	2	1	BPI: Platinum; ARIA: Platinum; BVMI: Gold; RIAA: Gold; RMNZ: Gold	Now in a Minute
"Without Love"	1996	39	—	—	12	77	47	—	—	41	24		Now in a Minute
"Mother"	1997	—	—	—	—	—	—	—	—	—	—		Now in a Minute
"Fool's Paradise"	1997	—	—	—	—	—	—	—	—	—	—		Now in a Minute
"Love & Affection"	1997	—	—	—	—	—	—	—	—	—	—		Now in a Minute
"At the Beginning" (with Richard Marx)	1997	—	64	—	—	77	—	—	—	45	—		Anastasia (soundtrack)
"I Could Be the One"	1998	99	76	9	—	69	—	—	—	—	—		Blue Planet
"Love Him"	1998	—	—	—	—	—	—	—	—	—	—		Blue Planet
"Falling"	1999	—	—	—	—	—	—	—	—	—	—		Blue Planet
"Shout"	2007	—	—	—	—	—	—	—	—	—	—		In the Pink
"You to Me"	2008	—	—	—	—	—	—	—	—	—	—		In the Pink
"Summertime"	2020	—	—	—	—	—	—	—	—	—	—		Non-album singles
"Take It Down"	2020	—	—	—	—	—	—	—	—	—	—		Non-album singles
"Stones in the River Bed" (with David Baron)	2020	—	—	—	—	—	—	—	—	—	—		I Told You So
"Silent World (2020)"	2020	—	—	—	—	—	—	—	—	—	—		I Told You So
"I Told You So"	2021	—	—	—	—	—	—	—	—	—	—		I Told You So
"The Frontline"	2021	—	—	—	—	—	—	—	—	—	—		Non-album singles
"ILYAF" (with Digital Farm Animals)	2023	—	—	—	—	—	—	—	—	—	—		Non-album singles
"Enjoy Youth" (Welsh version) (with Bright Light Bright Light)	2025	—	—	—	—	—	—	—	—	—	—		Enjoy Youth (Enjoy More: Deluxe Version)
"Burning Man" (with David Lowe)	2025	—	—	—	—	—	—	—	—	—	—		Wonderlust
"Where Is the Love?" (with David Lowe)	2025	—	—	—	—	—	—	—	—	—	—		Wonderlust
"Coming Home" (with David Lowe)	2025	—	—	—	—	—	—	—	—	—	—		Wonderlust
"Meet Me" (with David Lowe)	2026	—	—	—	—	—	—	—	—	—	—		Wonderlust
"Fall Back Girl" (with David Lowe)	2026	—	—	—	—	—	—	—	—	—	—		Wonderlust
"—" denotes releases that did not chart

=== Featured singles ===
Title	Year	Artist
"You and I"	2012	Project 46 and DubVision

=== Collaborations ===
- The Seduction of Claude Debussy – Art of Noise [guest vocalist] (2000)
- Take Me Over – Dino Lenny [guest vocalist] (2001)
- When the Rain Comes Down – [guest vocalist] (2001)
- Dancing Angel – Ryan Farish [guest vocalist] (2010)
- Chute (EP) – [lead singer] (2010)
- "Running Up That Hill" – David Baron [vocals] (2019)
- "Distance" - Michael Whalen [vocals] (2022)

== Awards and nominations ==
Year	Awards	Work	Category	Result	Ref.
1997	American Music Awards	Herself	Favorite Pop/Rock New Artist	Nominated	
1997	Brit Awards	Herself	British Female Solo Artist	Nominated	
1997	RSH Gold Awards	"I Love You Always Forever"	Airplay Hit of the Year	Won	
1997	ASCAP Pop Music Awards	"I Love You Always Forever"	Most Performed Song	Won	
1999	ASCAP Pop Music Awards	"I Love You Always Forever"	Most Performed Song	Won	

== See also ==
- List of number-one dance hits (United States)
- List of artists who reached number one on the U.S. Dance chart
