= Duncan Sheik =

American singer-songwriter & composer (1969–2026)

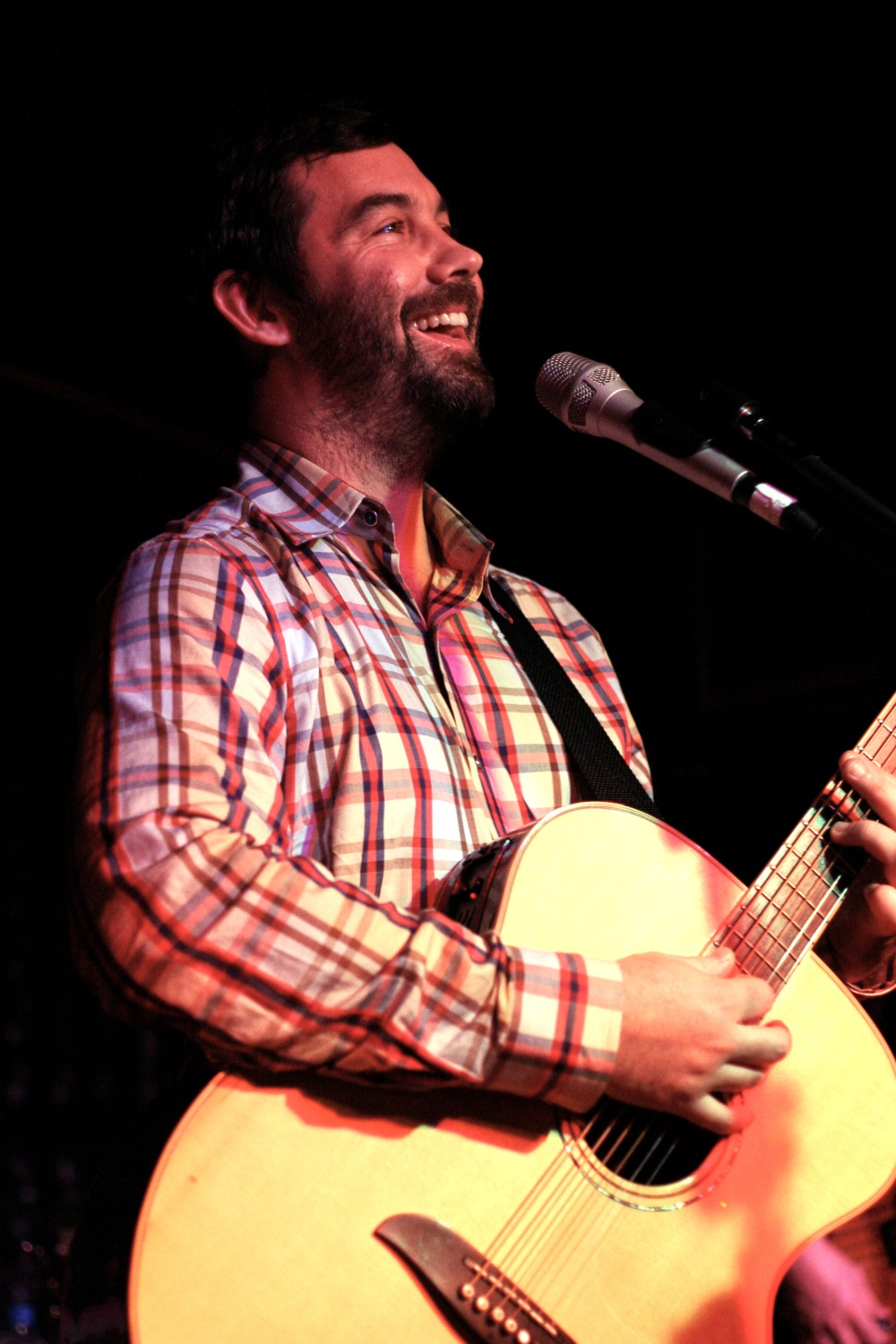
- Sheik in 2006

Background information
- Born: Duncan Scott Sheik; November 18, 1969; Glen Ridge, New Jersey, U.S.
- Origin: Los Angeles, California, U.S.
- Died: September 17, 2026 (aged 56) New York City, U.S.
- Genres: Rock; pop; alternative rock; acoustic rock; pop rock; R&B
- Occupations: Singer-songwriter; composer; actor
- Instruments: Guitar; piano; vocals
- Years active: 1993–2026
- Labels: Atlantic; Nonesuch; Elektra; Zoë; Rounder; Universal; Rhino Entertainment

Duncan Scott Sheik (November 18, 1969 – September 17, 2026) was an American singer-songwriter and composer. He is known for his 1996 debut single "Barely Breathing", which earned him a Grammy Award nomination for Best Male Pop Vocal Performance. Sheik composed music for motion pictures and Broadway musicals, winning the 2007 Tony Awards for Best Original Score and Best Orchestrations for his work on the musical Spring Awakening.

== Early life ==
Sheik was born on November 18, 1969, in Glen Ridge, New Jersey. He grew up in Montclair, New Jersey. Following his parents' divorce, he split time between his father's house in New Jersey and his mother's home in South Carolina. He was the half-brother of Broadway actress Kacie Sheik. Sheik's Juilliard-trained grandmother introduced him to the piano, and he later took up the electric guitar. By age 12, he was playing guitar with high school students in a cover band. After graduating from Phillips Academy, Andover in 1988, Sheik studied semiotics at Brown University; while at Brown, he played guitar in a band with fellow Brown student Lisa Loeb. Following his graduation from Brown in 1992, he moved to Los Angeles.

== Career ==
Early in his musical career, Sheik played guitar for other artists, including Liz and Lisa (with Elizabeth Mitchell and Lisa Loeb). Sheik also played on His Boy Elroy's 1993 album through his connections from a fellow Brown alum, Tracee Ellis Ross.

=== Singer-songwriter ===
In 1996, Sheik released his self-titled debut album, which was certified gold. The album featured the hit single "Barely Breathing", which peaked at number 16 and remained on the Billboard Hot 100 for 55 consecutive weeks. "Barely Breathing" also enjoyed Top 20 success on Adult Contemporary radio, reached No. 2 on the Adult Top 40 charts, and garnered Sheik a Grammy Award nomination for Best Male Pop Vocal Performance.

In 1998, Sheik recorded "Embraceable You" for Red Hot + Rhapsody, a George Gershwin tribute, and also recorded "Songbird" for another tribute, Legacy: A Tribute to Fleetwood Mac's Rumours. Also in 1998, Sheik released Humming, which featured orchestral and string arrangements.

Sheik sang a duet with singer Howard Jones on Jones' 2000 single entitled Someone You Need.

He released Phantom Moon, a Nick Drake-influenced album created in collaboration with poet and playwright Steven Sater, in 2001. The following year, Sheik released Daylight, which included the singles "On a High" and "Half-Life". After a four-year recording break, Sheik released White Limousine (2006), which included a DVD allowing listeners to remix and reinterpret songs from the album.

In 2009, he released Whisper House, a concept album which provided the score for the musical of the same name. The stage musical premiered at The Old Globe Theatre in San Diego in January 2010, after a workshop at Vassar College, produced by New York Stage and Film in 2009.

In 2011, Sheik released Covers 80s, an album including covers of popular 1980s songs. Concert dates in support of the album were later canceled due to Sheik seeking treatment for alcohol addiction. A remixed version of the album was released the following year. Sheik released the studio album Legerdemain in October 2015.

=== Composer ===
In addition to being a singer-songwriter, Sheik had also composed music for plays, musicals, and movie soundtracks. He composed original music for the 2002 New York Shakespeare Festival production of Twelfth Night.

In 2004, he composed the score for the film A Home at the End of the World. The AllMusic reviewer wrote: "...takes the sensitivity and tension of the film's plot and crafts incidental music and new songs that complement the movie well." He also composed the score for the 2005 film Through the Fire with Pete Miser.

Sheik wrote the music for Spring Awakening (2006) in collaboration with Steven Sater. Written over a period of eight years, the musical, which premiered off-Broadway during the summer, opened on Broadway to critical acclaim later in the fall. The musical was based on the controversial German expressionist play The Awakening of Spring, written by Frank Wedekind. Sheik won the 2006 Tony Award for Best Orchestrations for his work on Spring Awakening, and he and Sater won a Tony Award for Best Original Score. In addition, Spring Awakening won the Tony Award for Best Musical and a Grammy Award for Best Musical Show Album. The guitar that Sheik used to compose songs for Spring Awakening was displayed at the New York Public Library for the Performing Arts at Lincoln Center. As of 2012, Sheik was composing music for a feature-film adaptation of Spring Awakening, an adaptation almost a decade in the making.

In 2012, Sheik wrote Alice By Heart, an adaptation of Lewis Carroll's Alice's Adventures in Wonderland, along with collaborator Sater. Directed by Jessie Nelson with musical direction by Lance Horne, the musical was workshopped at the Royal National Theatre and commissioned by the National Theatre Connections.

He wrote the music and lyrics to the 2013 musical adaptation of American Psycho, which opened at the Almeida Theatre in London, and was later staged on Broadway in 2016.

In 2013, Sheik wrote the music for the musical adaptation of the novel Because of Winn-Dixie, which premiered at the Arkansas Repertory Theatre. Dixie was a collaboration with then-director John Tartaglia and Nell Benjamin, who wrote the book and lyrics. The musical ran at the Goodspeed Opera House in East Haddam, Connecticut from July 2019 to September 2019, directed by John Rando.

In 2015, Sheik wrote the musical thriller Noir with Kyle Jarrow. It premiered as part of New York Stage and Film's season in July to August 2015 at the Powerhouse Theater at Vassar College. Inspired by live radio plays and classic film noir, the musical was directed by Rachel Chavkin.

In 2016, he prepared the music for the Shakespeare Theatre Company (Washington, D.C.) production of The Taming of the Shrew, described in The Washington Post as "an assortment of preexisting songs by singer-songwriter Duncan Sheik".

=== Other work ===
Sheik produced singer-songwriter Micah Green's 2000 debut album as well as his 2012 follow-up.

In 2000, Sheik wrote the foreword to The Way of Youth: Buddhist Common Sense for Handling Life's Questions, by Soka Gakkai International leader Daisaku Ikeda.

In 2006, Sheik recorded the song "A Purple Trail" for Other Songs and Dances, Vol. 1. In 2008, Sheik participated in Songs for Tibet: The Art of Peace, an initiative to support Tibet and the 14th Dalai Lama,Tenzin Gyatso.

== Personal life and death ==
Concert dates in support of Sheik's 2011 album Covers 80s were canceled when Sheik sought treatment for alcoholism. In a message to fans on his Tumblr blog, Sheik noted that he had entered a treatment center on the same day his latest album was released and had told his staff, "My record is coming out and I'm checking in."

Sheik had a daughter with his wife Nora Ariffin, an actress turned realtor.

He practiced Nichiren Buddhism and was a member of the U.S. branch of the worldwide Buddhist association Soka Gakkai International.

On September 16, 2026, Sheik was reported by his family on his Instagram page to be hospitalized in "critical but stable condition". He died the following day from heart and organ failure leading to cardiac arrest in New York City, at the age of 56.

== Discography ==
Duncan Sheik discography
- Studio albums: 10
- Extended plays: 2
- Live albums: 1
- Compilation albums: 2
- Singles: 23
- Remix albums: 1

=== Albums ===
==== Studio albums ====
Year	Album details	Peak chart positions		Certifications (sales threshold)
Year	Album details	US	US Heat.	Certifications (sales threshold)
1996	Duncan Sheik: Release date: May 20, 1996; Label: Atlantic, Rhino; Formats: CD, cassette, digital download, streaming	83	1	US: Gold
1998	Humming: Release date: October 6, 1998; Label: Atlantic, Rhino; Formats: CD, cassette, digital download, streaming	163	—	
2001	Phantom Moon: Release date: February 27, 2001; Label: Nonesuch; Formats: CD, cassette, digital download, streaming	—	—	
2002	Daylight: Release date: August 22, 2002; Label: Atlantic, Rhino; Formats: CD, cassette, digital download, streaming	110	—	
2006	White Limousine: Release date: January 26, 2006; Label: Zoë; Formats: CD+DVD, digital download, streaming	—	—	
2009	Whisper House: Release date: January 27, 2009; Label: RCA Victor, Sony BMG, Masterworks Broadway; Formats: LP, CD, digital download, streaming	181	—	
2011	Covers 80s: Release date: June 7, 2011; Label: Sneaky; Formats: CD, digital download, streaming	—	—	
2015	Legerdemain: Release date: October 9, 2015; Label: Sneaky; Formats: CD, digital download, streaming	—	—	
2022	Claptrap: Release date: August 26, 2022; Label: AntiFragile; Formats: Digital download, streaming	—	—	
"—" denotes releases that did not chart

==== Live albums ====
Year	Album details
2020	Live at the Cafe Carlyle (New York, NY / 2017): Release date: December 4, 2020; Label: Sneaky, Missing Pieces; Formats: Digital download, streaming

==== Remix albums ====
Year	Album details
2012	Covers 80s Remixed: Release date: November 6, 2012; Label: Sneaky; Formats: CD, digital download, streaming

==== Compilation albums ====
Year	Album details
2006	Brighter/Later: A Duncan Sheik Anthology: Release date: October 23, 2006; Label: Rhino; Formats: 2xCD, digital download, streaming
2007	Greatest Hits – Brighter: A Duncan Sheik Collection: Release date: March 6, 2007; Label: Rhino; Formats: CD, digital download, streaming

=== Extended plays ===
Year	EP details
2005	Rhino Hi-Five: Duncan Sheik: Release date: September 20, 2005; Label: Rhino, Warner Strategic Marketing; Formats: Digital download, streaming
2011	Harvest (Music from the Motion Picture) (with David Poe): Release date: May 3, 2011; Label: Harvest Film; Formats: Digital download, streaming

=== Singles ===
Year	Single	Peak chart positions						Album
Year	Single	US	US AC	US Adult	US Dance	US Pop	CAN	Album
1996	"Barely Breathing"	16	19	2	—	10	12	Duncan Sheik
1997	"She Runs Away"	—	—	24	—	—	—	Duncan Sheik
1997	"Reasons for Living"	—	—	—	3	—	—	Duncan Sheik
1997	"Wishful Thinking"	—	—	—	—	—	—	Great Expectations (soundtrack)
1998	"Bite Your Tongue"	—	—	—	—	—	—	Humming
1999	"That Says It All"	—	—	—	—	—	—	Humming
2001	"A Mirror in the Heart"	—	—	—	—	—	—	Phantom Moon
2002	"On a High"	—	—	21	1	—	—	Daylight
2002	"Half-Life"	—	—	—	—	—	—	Daylight
2005	"White Limousine"	—	—	—	—	—	—	White Limousine
2005	"The Dawn's Request"	—	—	—	—	—	—	White Limousine
2008	"We're Here to Tell You"	—	—	—	—	—	—	Whisper House
2009	"Earthbound Starlight"	—	—	—	—	—	—	Whisper House
2009	"Play Your Part"	—	—	—	—	—	—	Whisper House
2012	"Shout"	—	—	—	—	—	—	Covers Eighties Remixed
2013	"Lay Down Your Weapons"	—	—	—	—	—	—	Non-album singles
2020	"Barely Breathing 2020 'Dear 45'"	—	—	—	—	—	—	Non-album singles
2021	"Better Things for Better Living" (with Simon Kafka)	—	—	—	—	—	—	Non-album singles
2022	"Experience"	—	—	—	—	—	—	Claptrap
2022	"Maybe"	—	—	—	—	—	—	Claptrap
2022	"Something Happening Here"	—	—	—	—	—	—	Claptrap
2022	"Chimera II" (featuring Oora)	—	—	—	—	—	—	Claptrap
2022	"There's No Telling"	—	—	—	—	—	—	Claptrap
"—" denotes releases that did not chart

== Stage credits ==
- Twelfth Night – 2002
- Nero (Another Golden Rome) – 2006 (San Francisco)
- Spring Awakening – 2006
- The Nightingale – 2003, 2005 (workshop) 2006 (based on The Nightingale)
- Whisper House – 2010 (Old Globe Theatre, San Diego)
- Carson McCullers Talks About Love (with Suzanne Vega) – 2011 (Off-Broadway)
- Alice by Heart – 2012
- Because of Winn-Dixie – 2013
- American Psycho – 2013
- Noir – 2015
- The Taming of the Shrew – 2016 (Washington, DC)
- The Secret Life of Bees – 2019 (Atlantic Theater Company, New York), 2023 (Almeida Theatre, London)
- Memoirs of Amorous Gentlemen – 2026

== Film and television credits ==
1996	"Barely Breathing", Party of Five; "Reasons for Living", ER
1997	"In the Absence of Sun", The Saint; "Serena", Fall
1998	Beverly Hills 90210, onscreen, uncredited, episode "The Morning After"; "Wishful Thinking", Great Expectations
1999	"Alibi", Teaching Mrs. Tingle; "That Says It All", Three to Tango
2000	"View from the Other Side", Friends; "A Body Goes Down", Jeff Buckley: Goodbye and Hello; "Now or Never", Boys and Girls
2002	"On a High", Birds of Prey
2003	"Half Life", What a Girl Wants; "Beyond the Sea" (performed as Bobby Darin), American Dreams
2004	"Something Somewhere"/"There's a Home", A Home at the End of the World
2005	"I Am a Pilgrim", Transamerica
2007	"Barely Breathing", Cold Case; "I Wouldn't Mind"/"As Shadows Do", The Cake Eaters
2010	"Mama Who Bore Me", 90210
2012	"Barely Breathing", Glee; "Barely Breathing", Girls

== Awards and nominations ==
Year	Awards	Work	Category	Result
1997	Billboard Music Awards	Himself	Top Adult Top 40 Artist	Nominated
1997	Billboard Music Awards	"Barely Breathing"	Top Adult Top 40 Track	Won
1998	Grammy Awards	"Barely Breathing"	Best Male Pop Vocal Performance	Nominated
1999	BMI Pop Awards	"Barely Breathing"	Award-Winning Song	Won
2007	Tony Awards	Spring Awakening	Best Original Score	Won
2007	Tony Awards	Spring Awakening	Best Orchestrations	Won
2007	Drama Desk Awards	Spring Awakening	Outstanding Music	Won
2007	Drama Desk Awards	Spring Awakening	Outstanding Orchestrations	Nominated
2007	Outer Critics Circle Award	Spring Awakening	Outstanding New Score	Won
2008	Grammy Awards	Spring Awakening	Best Musical Show Album	Won
2016	Outer Critics Circle Award	American Psycho	Outstanding New Score	Nominated
2020	Outer Critics Circle Award	The Secret Life of Bees	Outstanding New Score	Honored
2020	Outer Critics Circle Award	The Secret Life of Bees	Outstanding Orchestrations	Honored

== See also ==
- List of number-one dance hits (United States)
- List of artists who reached number one on the US Dance chart
