= Could You Be the One? =

Could You Be the One? may refer to:

- Could You Be the One? (Hüsker Dü song)
- Could You Be the One? (Stereophonics song)
