= I Love You Always Forever =

1996 single by Donna Lewis

Single by Donna Lewis

from the album Now in a Minute
- B-side: "Pink Chairs"; "Have You Ever Loved"; "Simone"
- Released: 16 April 1996
- Studio: Shelter Island Sound (Shelter Island, New York)
- Genre: Pop
- Length: 3:59 (album version); 3:24 (radio edit)
- Label: Atlantic
- Songwriter: Donna Lewis
- Producers: Donna Lewis; Kevin Killen

Donna Lewis singles chronology
"I Love You Always Forever" (1996)	"Fool's Paradise" (1996)

Music video
- "I Love You Always Forever" on YouTube

"I Love You Always Forever" is a song by Welsh singer Donna Lewis from her debut album, Now in a Minute (1996). Written by Lewis and produced by Lewis and Kevin Killen, it was released as the album's lead single. In the United States, it was serviced to contemporary hit radio on 16 April 1996 and was issued commercially on 7 May, while in the United Kingdom, it was released on 26 August. The song is inspired by H. E. Bates' novel Love for Lydia, from which the chorus is taken.

The song was a commercial hit, peaking at number five on the UK Singles Chart and reaching the top 10 in more than 15 countries, including Australia, Austria, Canada, France, Ireland, and Norway. In the US, the song rose to number two on the Billboard Hot 100, where it remained for nine weeks, behind Los del Río's "Macarena". But it topped the US Cash Box Top 100 at the same time. It was certified platinum in Australia and the UK and gold in France, Germany, New Zealand, Norway, and the US. The accompanying music video was directed by Randee St. Nicholas. The success of the song saw Lewis nominated for the Brit Award for Best British Female Artist in 1997. In 2023, Billboard ranked "I Love You Always Forever" among the "500 Best Pop Songs of All Time".

In 2016, a cover version of the song by Australian pop singer Betty Who peaked at number six on the ARIA Singles Chart and topped the US Billboard Dance Club Songs chart.

== Background ==
Inspired by the novel Love for Lydia by H. E. Bates, "I Love You Always Forever" is a pop song in which the singer declares her endless love for her significant other. The song was originally titled "Lydia", but was later changed because there was no mention of anyone with that name in the song. The chorus, "I love you always forever, near and far closer together", is a quote taken directly from the book.

== Composition ==
"I Love You Always Forever" is written in the key of C major in common time with a tempo of 104 beats per minute. Lewis' vocals span from F_{3} to G_{4} in the song.

== Reception ==
The success of "I Love You Always Forever" earned Lewis a nomination for Best British Female Artist at the 1997 Brit Awards. In the US, Andrea Ganis, executive VP of Lewis' record label, Atlantic, said: "Radio stations across the country keep telling us the same thing over and over", Ganis says. "They play it and, almost overnight, it's their most requested song. Maybe it's because things have been so dark lately in pop and then along comes a record that everybody can sing along to. It's almost like a catharsis for a lot of people." It became a "runaway hit" without any extra marketing boost from high-profile events of the time such as a hit movie or the 1996 Atlanta Olympic Games, and was the first single to achieve over one million airplay detections in the US.

AllMusic editor Tom Demalon called the song "compelling" in his review of Now in a Minute. He noted that Lewis "has a girlish voice that sounds like a less quirky Kate Bush." Larry Flick from Billboard magazine described it as a "quietly percussive pop chugger", complimenting Lewis' voice as a "delicate, girlish voice that gives the song a winsome quality, which adds to its already considerable charm." Tracey Pepper from Entertainment Weekly noted that it is "more sophisticated than a first listen might reveal. 'I Love You Always Forever''s chanted chorus, chugging rhythm, and bright melody make it obvious that the newcomer Donna Lewis, whose girlish voice often sounds like Cyndi Lauper's, knows the value of building tension and mood, even in a pop song." Eamon Joyce from Miscellany News commented that "upon hearing the song, it's embedded in your head for weeks." Bob Waliszewski of Plugged In stated that Lewis "pledges lifelong commitment" on the song.

== Music video ==
The music video for "I Love You Always Forever" was directed by Randee St. Nicholas. It is very simple, showing Lewis performing the song dressed in all white in a beige rotating room. Other scenes feature her against a black background, with snow boots on her hands against a wall, and playing a piano.

== Impact and legacy ==
In October 2023, Billboard magazine ranked "I Love You Always Forever" number 408 in their list of "500 Best Pop Songs of All Time", writing, "The gauziest pop smash of the mid-’90s, as soft and billowing and comforting as the fuzzy curtains Donna Lewis surrounds herself with in the song’s music video." Insider featured the song in their "The 51 Best Love Songs of All Time" in 2018. Kim Renfro added that it is a "true bop" that is reminiscent of Cyndi Lauper's music of 10 years earlier, but with "slightly more pizazz". Same year, Stacker ranked it number ten in their list of "Best Pop Songs of the Last 25 years", noting Lewis' "ethereal voice over a heavenly backdrop of synthesizers and understated drum beats". In August 2026, Billboard ranked it number 36 in their list of "The Biggest No. 2 Hot 100 Hits of All Time" list, noting that the song had peaked at number two, just behind Los del Rio's "Macarena".

== Track listings ==
- UK CD single
1. "I Love You Always Forever" (LP version) – 3:59
2. "Pink Chairs" – 3:26
3. "Have You Ever Loved" – 3:31
4. "I Love You Always Forever" (Philly remix) – 4:00
- UK cassette single
1. "I Love You Always Forever" (LP version) – 3:59
2. "I Love You Always Forever" (Philly remix) – 4:00
- European CD single
1. "I Love You Always Forever" (radio edit) – 3:21
2. "I Love You Always Forever" (Philly mix) – 4:00
3. "I Love You Always Forever" (Sylk 130 remix) – 9:00
- US maxi-CD and Australian CD single
1. "I Love You Always Forever" (album version) – 3:58
2. "I Love You Always Forever" (Sylk 130 edit) – 4:38
3. "I Love You Always Forever" (Sylk 130 remix) – 9:00
4. "I Love You Always Forever" (Sylk 130 instrumental) – 4:59
5. "I Love You Always Forever" (drumapella) – 5:11
- US CD single
1. "I Love You Always Forever" (radio edit) – 3:21
2. "Simone" (album version) – 4:26
- US 12-inch single

A1. "I Love You Always Forever" (Sylk 130 remix) – 9:00
B1. "I Love You Always Forever" (Sylk 130 instrumental) – 4:59
B2. "I Love You Always Forever" (album version) – 3:58
B3. "I Love You Always Forever" (a cappella) – 4:10

- US cassette single
1. "I Love You Always Forever" (album version) – 3:58
2. "Simone" (album version) – 4:26
3. "I Love You Always Forever" (Sylk 130 edit) – 4:38
- Japanese CD single
1. "I Love You Always Forever" (LP version)
2. "Without Love" (LP version)
3. "Pink Chairs"
4. "Have You Ever Loved"
5. "I Love You Always Forever" (Philly remix)

== Charts ==
=== Weekly charts ===
Chart (1996–1997)	Peak position
Australia (ARIA)	2
Austria (Ö3 Austria Top 40)	3
Belgium (Ultratop 50 Flanders)	12
Belgium (Ultratop 50 Wallonia)	10
Canada Top Singles (RPM)	3
Canada Adult Contemporary (RPM)	1
Czech Republic (IFPI CR)	6
Denmark (IFPI)	10
Estonia (Eesti Top 20)	1
Europe (Eurochart Hot 100)	6
France (SNEP)	5
Germany (GfK)	7
Hungary (Mahasz)	10
Iceland (Íslenski Listinn Topp 40)	28
Ireland (IRMA)	3
Israel (Israeli Singles Chart)	2
Italy Airplay (Music & Media)	8
Netherlands (Dutch Top 40)	19
Netherlands (Single Top 100)	25
New Zealand (Recorded Music NZ)	9
Norway (VG-lista)	3
Scottish Singles Sales (Official Charts)	4
Sweden (Sverigetopplistan)	16
Switzerland (Schweizer Hitparade)	6
UK Singles (Official Charts)	5
US Billboard Hot 100	2
US Adult Contemporary (Billboard)	2
US Adult Pop Airplay (Billboard)	1
US Dance Singles Sales (Billboard)	20
US Pop Airplay (Billboard)	1
US Rhythmic Airplay (Billboard)	2
US Cash Box Top 100	1

Chart (2019)	Peak position
Finland Airplay (Radiosoittolista)	63

=== Year-end charts ===
Chart (1996)	Position
Australia (ARIA)	13
Austria (Ö3 Austria Top 40)	23
Belgium (Ultratop 50 Flanders)	100
Belgium (Ultratop 50 Wallonia)	96
Brazil (Crowley)	42
Canada Top Singles (RPM)	28
Canada Adult Contemporary (RPM)	5
Europe (Eurochart Hot 100)	48
France (SNEP)	51
Germany (Media Control)	74
Israel (Israeli Singles Chart)	37
Sweden (Topplistan)	95
UK Singles (OCC)	36
UK Airplay (Music Week)	16
US Billboard Hot 100	8
US Adult Contemporary (Billboard)	20
US Adult Top 40 (Billboard)	6
US Top 40/Mainstream (Billboard)	2
US Top 40/Rhythm-Crossover (Billboard)	17

Chart (1997)	Position
Canada Adult Contemporary (RPM)	63
US Billboard Hot 100	64
US Adult Contemporary (Billboard)	18
US Adult Top 40 (Billboard)	31
US Rhythmic Top 40 (Billboard)	85
US Top 40/Mainstream (Billboard)	59

=== Decade-end charts ===
Chart (1990–1999)	Position
US Billboard Hot 100	71

== Certifications ==
Region	Certification	Certified units/sales
Australia (ARIA)	Platinum	70,000^{^}
Denmark (IFPI Danmark)	Gold	45,000^{‡}
France (SNEP)	Gold	250,000^{*}
Germany (BVMI)	Gold	250,000^{^}
New Zealand (RMNZ)	Gold	5,000^{*}
Norway (IFPI Norway)	Gold	
United Kingdom (BPI)	Platinum	600,000^{‡}
United States (RIAA)	Gold	800,000
^{*} Sales figures based on certification alone.^{^} Shipments figures based on certification alone.^{‡} Sales+streaming figures based on certification alone.

== Release history ==
Region	Release date	Format(s)	Label(s)	Ref(s).
United States	16 April 1996	Contemporary hit radio	Atlantic	
United States	7 May 1996	CD; cassette	Atlantic	
United Kingdom	26 August 1996	CD; cassette	Atlantic	
Japan	11 November 1996	CD	Atlantic	

== Other releases ==
Lewis has re-recorded the song at least twice. A re-recording with slightly modified instrumentation appears as a bonus track of her 2008 album In the Pink. In 2015, Lewis released the song again on her jazz-influenced covers album, Brand New Day. She was reluctant to include the song at all; but the track that appears on the album has a "completely different arrangement", and Lewis says she now likes it. Matt Collar of AllMusic felt that the new version was a "ruminative reworking" of the original.

== Betty Who version ==
"I Love You Always Forever"

Single by Betty Who

from the album The Valley
- Released: 3 June 2016
- Genre: Synth-pop; pop; electronic
- Length: 3:43
- Label: RCA
- Songwriter: Donna Lewis
- Producer: Peter Thomas

Betty Who singles chronology
"All of You" (2015)	"I Love You Always Forever" (2016)	"Heaven" (2016)

Music video
- "I Love You Always Forever" on YouTube

Australian pop singer Betty Who released a version of the song on 3 June 2016, with remixes released on 29 July 2016. It was released as the lead single from her second studio album, The Valley.

=== Music video ===
The music video, directed by Ben Cope and Daniel Gomes, was released on 14 July 2016.

=== Chart performance ===
The song was Who's first to enter the Australian ARIA Singles Chart, peaking at number six, while also reaching number one on AirCheck's National Radio Airplay Chart. The song has also had minor success in New Zealand, peaking at number 33. The song was successful on the US Dance Club Songs chart, where it peaked at number one, becoming her third number one on the chart.

=== Track listings ===
Digital download

1. "I Love You Always Forever" – 3:43

Remixes EP

1. "I Love You Always Forever" (Viceroy Remix) – 4:08
2. "I Love You Always Forever" (Instant Karma Remix) – 3:39
3. "I Love You Always Forever" (Pink Panda Remix) – 4:24
4. "I Love You Always Forever" (Mighty Mike & Teesa Remix) – 3:26
5. "I Love You Always Forever" (Hector Fonseca & Eduardo Lujan Radio Edit) – 3:33

=== Weekly charts ===
Chart (2016)	Peak position
Australia (ARIA)	6
Australia (AirCheck National Radio Airplay)	1
New Zealand (Recorded Music NZ)	33
US Dance Club Songs (Billboard)	1

=== Year-end charts ===
Chart (2016)	Position
Australia (ARIA)	67
US Dance Club Songs (Billboard)	37

=== Certifications ===
Region	Certification	Certified units/sales
Australia (ARIA)	Platinum	70,000^{‡}
^{‡} Sales+streaming figures based on certification alone.

== Other uses ==
- The chorus is interpolated in Lennon Stella's song "Save Us", from her debut album Three. Two. One. (2020).
- The song was heavily sampled in Switch Disco's dance song "Everything", which was released on 25 June 2021. The song peaked at number eight on the UK iTunes chart.

== See also ==
- List of number-one dance singles of 2016 (U.S.)
