= She Runs Away =

Single by Duncan Sheik

from the album Duncan Sheik
- B-side: "Fake Plastic Trees"; "View from the Other Side"
- Released: January 14, 1997
- Length: 3:38
- Label: Atlantic
- Songwriter: Duncan Sheik
- Producer: Rupert Hine

Duncan Sheik singles chronology
"Barely Breathing" (1996)	"She Runs Away" (1997)	"Reasons for Living" (1997)

Music video
- "She Runs Away" on YouTube

"She Runs Away" is a song by American singer-songwriter Duncan Sheik from his eponymous debut studio album (1996). It was released to triple A radio on January 14, 1997, as the second single from the album. The song peaked at number 24 on the Billboard Adult Top 40, and number 46 on the Radio & Records Contemporary Hit Radio chart. Originally produced for the album by Rupert Hine, it was remixed for single release by Peter Nashel.

== Track listings and formats ==
- CD single
1. "She Runs Away" (Remix) – 3:38
2. "Fake Plastic Trees" – 5:48
3. "View from the Other Side" – 5:56

== Charts ==
Peak chart positions of "She Runs Away"
Chart (1997)	Peak position
US Adult Pop Airplay (Billboard)	24
US Contemporary Hit Radio (Radio and Records)	46

== Release history ==
Region	Date	Format(s)	Label(s)	Ref.
United States	January 14, 1997	Triple A radio	Atlantic	
United States	July 1, 1997	Contemporary hit radio	Atlantic	
