= Humming (album) =

Studio album by Duncan Sheik
- Released: October 6, 1998
- Studios: Warm Pod, The Looking Glass Studio and Teach Spooky (New York City, New York, USA); Mix This! (Pacific Palisades, California, USA); El Cortijo Studio (Andalusia, Spain); Abbey Road Studios and Angel Recording Studios (London, UK); Adyel Studios (Casablanca, Morocco)
- Length: 62:48
- Label: Atlantic
- Producers: Rupert Hine; Duncan Sheik

Duncan Sheik chronology
Duncan Sheik (1996)	Humming (1998)	Phantom Moon (2001)

Singles from Humming
- 1. "Bite Your Tongue" Released: 1998; 2. "That Says It All" Released: 1999

Professional ratings
Review scores
Source	Rating
Allmusic	3/5 stars
Entertainment Weekly	B+
Los Angeles Times	3.5/4 stars
Rolling Stone	3/5 stars
USA Today	3.5/4 stars

Humming is the second album by American singer-songwriter Duncan Sheik. It was released on Atlantic Records in 1998.

== Release and reception ==
The album was met with modest success and favorable reviews, peaking at #163 on the album chart. According to Allmusic, the album "sprawls across similarly introspective terrain, yet veers more toward the pragmatic than the romantic", adding, "Humming has a more profound and resonant base, complemented by accentuated drums and various string elements."

== Details ==
The album, which featured the London Session Orchestra on some tracks, contained tributes to other artists, including "That Says It All" and "A Body Goes Down"; the latter song is an elegy for Jeff Buckley, following his death in 1997, which was also included in the documentary Amazing Grace: Jeff Buckley. The final track is named after Nichiren, who was a Buddhist monk of 13th century Japan.

== Track listing ==
1. "In Between" - 4:32
2. "Rubbed Out" - 5:09
3. "Bite Your Tongue" - 3:56
4. "Alibi" - 4:07
5. "Varying Degrees of Con-Artistry" - 6:56
6. "That Says It All" - 4:14
7. "Everyone, Everywhere" - 3:30
8. "A Body Goes Down" - 6:05
9. "Nothing Special" - 3:28
10. "House Full of Riches" - 5:37
11. "Nichiren" - 14:47**

**Note: A hidden song, "Foreshadowing," begins at the 6:40 mark of track 11 after the close of "Nichiren"

== Personnel ==
- Duncan Sheik – vocals, acoustic piano (1, 2, 4, 5, 11), harmonium (1, 11), steel string guitar (1), nylon guitar (1, 7), resonator guitar (1), acoustic guitars (2–4, 6, 8, 9), electric guitars (2, 3, 7, 10), slide guitar (4), synthesizers (7), acoustic baritone guitar (10)
- Rupert Hine – acoustic piano (2, 6), backing vocals (2), harmonium (5, 10), treated piano (11)
- Gerry Leonard – electric guitars (1–4, 6, 7, 9, 10), guitar loops {credited as Spooky Ghost} (2, 3, 6, 10), acoustic guitar (5, 8, 11)
- Jeff Allen – acoustic bass (1), bass (2–4, 6–8), 5-string fretless bass (5), 5-string bass (10), Mexican 6-string acoustic bass (11)
- Mark Plati – bass (9)
- Jay Bellerose – cocktail drum set (1)
- Matt Johnson – drums (2–8, 10, 11)
- Trevor Morais – bass drum (5)
- Juliet Prater – percussion (1, 2, 4, 6, 7, 9–11), bodhran (5)
- Jaron Lanier – alto flute (8, 11), hulusi (11)
- Abdellah Miry – violin (8)
- The London Session Orchestra – string quartet (1), bass clarinet and flutes (1), strings (4, 5, 7, 10)
- Simon Hale – orchestral conductor (1, 4, 5, 7, 10), string quartet arrangements (1), bass clarinet and flute arrangements (1), string arrangements (4, 5, 7, 10)

=== Production ===
- Ron Shapiro – A&R
- Rupert Hine – producer
- Duncan Sheik – producer
- Richard Horowitz – Moroccan string producer
- Mark Plati – additional production (1), recording (1, 9), additional recording
- Ruadhri Cushnan – recording
- Bob Clearmountain – mixing
- John Gallen – string quartet, bass clarinet and flute recording (1)
- Gary Thomas – string recording (4, 5, 7, 10)
- David Boucher – additional recording, mix assistant
- Gerry Leonard – additional guitar recording
- Andrew Dudman – string quartet, bass clarinet and flute recording assistant (1)
- David Walter – string recording assistant (4, 5, 7, 10)
- Greg Calbi – mastering at Masterdisk (New York City, New York, USA)
- Richard Bates – art direction
- Allen Hori – design
- Julian Broad – photography
- Belinda – band photography
- Mike Karg – grooming
- Janine Israel – styling
- David Leinhardt – management

Pre-production

- Tim Sommer – A&R
- Michael Tudor – engineer, consultant
