= Bite Your Tongue (song) =

Single by Duncan Sheik

from the album Humming
- Released: September 8, 1998
- Genre: Rock
- Length: 3:55 (Album Version)
- Label: Atlantic
- Songwriter: Duncan Sheik
- Producer: Duncan Sheik

Duncan Sheik singles chronology
| "Wishful Thinking" (1998) | "Bite Your Tongue" (1998) | "That Says It All" (1999) |

"Bite Your Tongue" was released as a single on February 2, 1999 and is found on Duncan Sheik's second studio album, Humming. The song was called "a driving hard-pop number" by Rolling Stone's Neva Chonin, "self-deprecating" by Allmusic's Roxanne Blanford and Elysa Gardner from the Los Angeles Times said: "The single “Bite Your Tongue” rocks harder and more buoyantly than his previous hits.". The song would also appear as a bonus track on the 2004 Daylight (Limited Tour Edition) CD and on the 2006 double disk album Brighter/Later: A Duncan Sheik Anthology, released by Rhino Records (Also released in 2007 as Greatest Hits – Brighter: A Duncan Sheik Collection, a single CD version.)

== Beverly Hills, 90210 ==
In 1998 Duncan Sheik appeared on the season premiere of the show Beverly Hills, 90210, In an episode titled "The Morning After" Sheik performed "Bite Your Tongue" as well as "Barely Breathing".

== Track listing ==
1. "Bite Your Tongue" (Album Version) – 3:55
2. "Bite Your Tongue" (Modern Mix) – 3:55
