= On a High =

Single by Duncan Sheik

from the album Daylight
- Released: 2002
- Genre: Pop rock
- Length: 3:39
- Label: Atlantic
- Songwriter: Duncan Sheik
- Producer: Duncan Sheik

Duncan Sheik singles chronology
"A Mirror in the Heart" (2001)	"On a High" (2002)	"Half-Life" (2002)

"On a High" is a 2002 song written and recorded by singer-songwriter Duncan Sheik and released as the first single from his album Daylight. It topped the Billboard Dance Club Songs chart and peaked at number 21 on the Adult Pop Airplay chart.

A female cover of "On a High" can be heard in the commercials for the TV movie Queen Sized, sung by Nikki Blonsky.

The song was also featured on an episode of Laguna Beach: The Real Orange County.

== Track listing ==
=== US radio promo ===
1. "On a High" (Album Version)

=== German commercial single ===
1. "On a High" (Single Version)
2. "On a High" (Jamie Myerson Remix Edit)
3. "On a High" (Gabriel & Dresden's Love From Humboldt Edit)

== Chart performance ==
Chart (2002)	Peak position
US Adult Pop Airplay (Billboard)	21
US Dance Club Songs (Billboard)	1
