= Wishful Thinking (Duncan Sheik song) =

Single by Duncan Sheik

from the album Great Expectations soundtrack
- Released: 1997
- Genre: Rock
- Length: 4:28 (Album Version)
- Label: Atlantic
- Songwriter(s): Duncan Sheik
- Producer(s): Peter Nashel, Duncan Sheik

Duncan Sheik singles chronology
"Reasons for Living" (1997)	"Wishful Thinking" (1997)	"Bite Your Tongue" (1998)

"Wishful Thinking" is a song written and performed by Duncan Sheik for the soundtrack to the 1998 motion picture Great Expectations starring Ethan Hawke, Gwyneth Paltrow, and Robert De Niro. The song was released as the only radio single from the soundtrack.

== Track listing ==
=== US radio promo ===
1. "Wishful Thinking" (Radio Edit) - 3:40
2. "Wishful Thinking" (Album Version) - 4:28

=== US Commercial Single ===
1. "Wishful Thinking" (Radio Edit) - 3:40
2. "In The Absence Of Sun" (Album Version) - 5:05

=== German commercial single ===
1. "Wishful Thinking" (Radio Edit) - 3:40
2. "In The Absence Of Sun" - 5:05
3. "Wishful Thinking" (Album Version) - 4:28
