= Reasons for Living =

Single by Duncan Sheik

from the album Duncan Sheik
- Released: 1997
- Genre: Rock
- Length: 4:31 (Album Version)
- Label: Atlantic
- Songwriter: Duncan Sheik
- Producer: Rupert Hine

Duncan Sheik singles chronology
"She Runs Away" (1997)	"Reasons for Living" (1997)	"Wishful Thinking" (1997)

"Reasons for Living" is the third and final single from the debut album of American singer-songwriter Duncan Sheik.

== Details ==
While the album version of the song did not fare well on the radio, the club remixes helped the single reach number three on the Billboard Hot Dance Club Play chart.

== Track listing ==
1. "Reasons for Living" (Johnny Vicious Mix) - 11:01
2. "Reasons for Living" (PQM's Bootleg Revisited Mix) - 6:09
3. "Reasons for Living" (La Leche Mix) - 3:43
4. "Reasons for Living" (Madamix) - 7:45
5. "Reasons for Living" (Vicious Groove-A-Pella) - 3:20
6. "Reasons for Living" (LP Mix) - 4:30

== Chart performance ==
Chart (1997)	Peak position
US Dance Club Songs (Billboard)	3
