= Barely Breathing =

1996 single by Duncan Sheik

Single by Duncan Sheik

from the album Duncan Sheik
- B-side: "Home"
- Released: May 3, 1996
- Genre: Pop rock; folk-pop
- Length: 4:15 (album version); 3:56 (radio edit)
- Label: Atlantic
- Songwriter: Duncan Sheik
- Producer: Rupert Hine

Duncan Sheik singles chronology
"Barely Breathing" (1996)	"She Runs Away" (1997)

Music video
- "Barely Breathing" on YouTube

"Barely Breathing" is a song by American singer-songwriter Duncan Sheik from his eponymous debut studio album (1996). Atlantic Records released the song to US modern rock and triple A radio on May 3, 1996. Sheik is the sole writer of the song, while production was helmed by Rupert Hine. The song became a chart hit in North America in early 1997, receiving several accolades in the years following its release.

== Critical reception ==
Larry Flick of Billboard magazine called the song's hook "breezy and memorable" and its lyrics "intelligent".

== Chart performance ==
"Barely Breathing" peaked at number 16 on the US Billboard Hot 100 on May 10, 1997, and remained on the chart for 55 weeks. At the time, it was the fourth-longest-running single on the Hot 100. It also reached number one on the Billboard Triple-A chart and number two on the Billboard Adult Top 40 chart. In Canada, the song peaked at number 12 on the RPM 100 Hit Tracks chart and number 20 on the RPM Adult Contemporary Tracks chart. At the end of 1997, it finished at number 79 on the 100 Hit Tracks year-end chart. "Barely Breathing" also charted in Iceland, peaking at number 40 on the Íslenski Listinn Topp 40.

== Accolades ==
"Barely Breathing" was ranked number 88 on VH1's "100 Greatest Songs of the '90s". and number eight on their 40 Greatest One-Hit Wonders of the 90s list. Additionally, "Barely Breathing" earned Sheik a Grammy nomination for Best Male Pop Vocal Performance and a BMI Award for Most Played Song of the Year in 1997.

== Music video ==
The music video was directed by Thom Oliphant in Brooklyn, New York, in the Brooklyn Navy Yard. It depicts Sheik in a warehouse in what looks like an air chamber, and him in an apartment with a woman (played by Natane Boudreau).

== Track listings and formats ==
- US CD single and cassette
1. "Barely Breathing" – 4:15
2. "Home" – 4:48
- European CD single
1. "Barely Breathing" (radio edit) – 3:57
2. "The End of Outside" (live) – 5:02
3. "Rubbed Out" (live) – 5:19

== Credits and personnel ==
Credits and personnel are adapted from the Duncan Sheik album liner notes.

- Duncan Sheik – lead vocals, harmony vocals, acoustic guitar, electric guitar, E-Bow, piano, sampler
- Pino Palladino – bass
- Jean-Michel Biger – drums
- Rupert Hine – percussion, background vocals
- Fran Banish – slide guitar

== Charts ==
=== Weekly charts ===
Chart (1996–1997)	Peak position
Canada Top Singles (RPM)	12
Canada Adult Contemporary (RPM)	20
Iceland (Íslenski Listinn Topp 40)	40
US Billboard Hot 100	16
US Adult Alternative Airplay (Billboard)	1
US Adult Contemporary (Billboard)	19
US Adult Pop Airplay (Billboard)	2
US Pop Airplay (Billboard)	10

Chart (2026)	Peak position
US Digital Song Sales (Billboard)	3

=== Year-end charts ===
Chart (1996)	Position
US Triple-A (Billboard)	3

Chart (1997)	Position
Canada Top Singles (RPM)	79
US Billboard Hot 100	18
US Adult Top 40 (Billboard)	1
US Top 40/Mainstream (Billboard)	27
US Triple-A (Billboard)	32

Chart (1998)	Position
US Adult Top 40 (Billboard)	94

== Release history ==
Region	Date	Format(s)	Label(s)	Ref.
United States	May 3, 1996	Modern rock; triple A radio	Atlantic	
United States	October 29, 1996	Contemporary hit radio	Atlantic	
United States	November 12, 1996	CD; cassette	Atlantic	

== Cover versions ==
"Barely Breathing" was one of the songs covered by the cast of Glee during the October 12, 2012, episode "The Break Up".
