= Gerry Leonard =

Irish musician (born 1962)

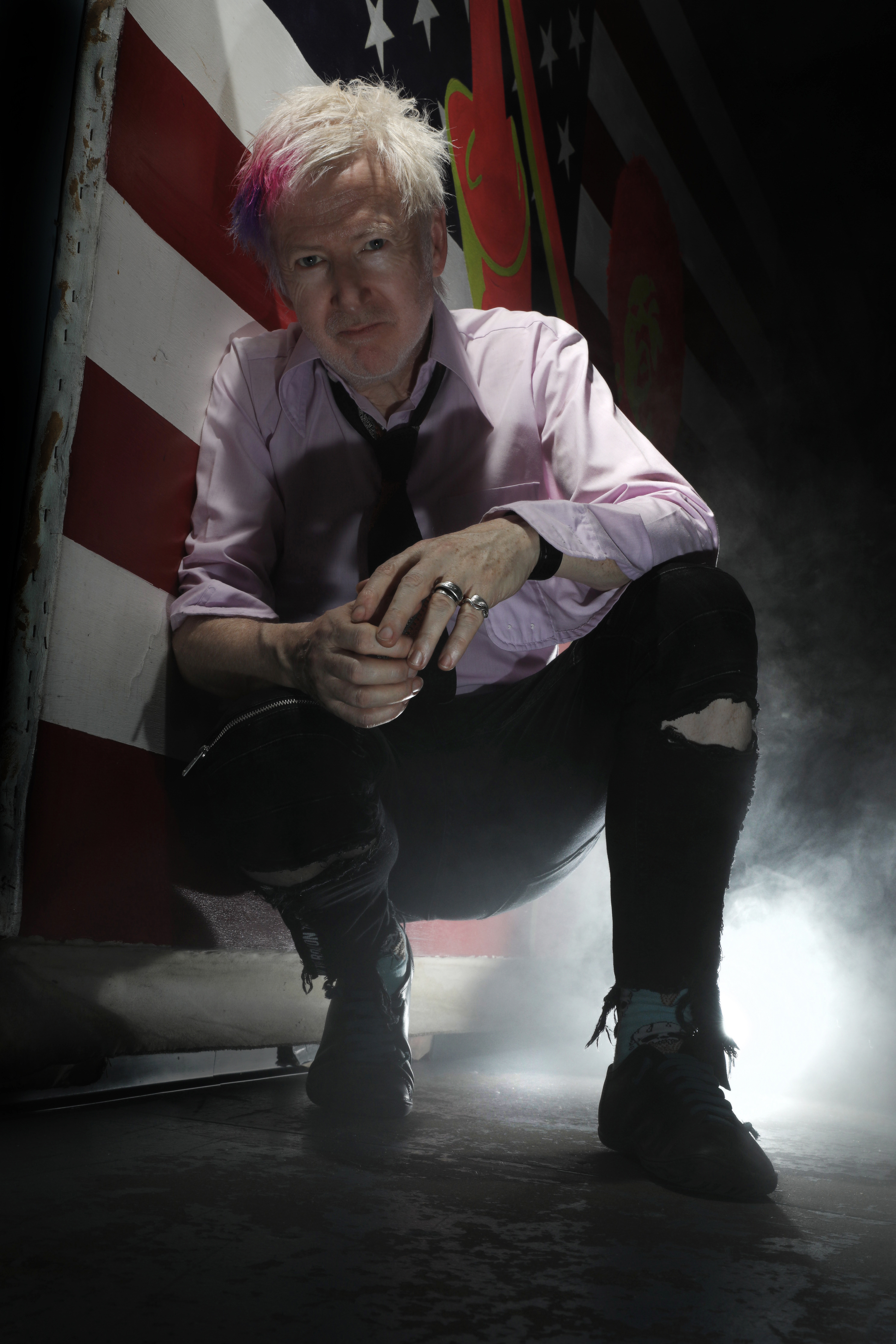
- Leonard with Spooky Ghost in 2023

Background information
- Born: February 26, 1962 (age 63); Clontarf, Dublin, Ireland
- Genres: Rock; folk; ambient
- Occupations: Musician; record producer; composer
- Instruments: Guitar; keyboards; mandolin
- Years active: 1989–present
- Labels: Ceol na Phúca; Spooky Ghost

Gerry Leonard (born 26 February 1962) is an Irish guitarist known for his harmonic and ambient guitar style, and for his work with David Bowie, Suzanne Vega, Rufus Wainwright, Laurie Anderson, Duncan Sheik and many others. He has a solo project called Spooky Ghost. He lives in New York.

== Early life ==
Leonard was born and raised in Clontarf, Dublin. He played in bands as a teen and was influenced by a mixture of Led Zeppelin, punk, post-punk, and whatever was playing on Top of the Pops. He worked as a tape operator in Lombard Sound Studios; one of his jobs involved recording a demo tape by a 16-year-old Sinéad O'Connor.

== Career ==
As a producer, Leonard has also worked on albums for Donna Lewis (In the Pink), Ari Hest (The Fire Plays), Donnie Mortimer (Ten Eventful Years), Czech band Čechomor (Mistečko), and Pamela Sue Mann. When discussing Leonard's contribution to her album L'Oeuf, Laurie Anderson said, "I've always been a fan of Gerry Leonard's lush and groovy parts, so that makes the listening experience even deeper."

=== Soundtracks ===
Leonard has worked in film and theatre, with his guitar playing featured on Peter Nashel's scores for The Deep End and Bee Season, Trevor Jones's soundtrack for CrissCross, and Roger Waters's song for The Last Mimzy. He wrote and performed the score for the Irish independent movie 32A, directed by Marian Quinn, and for Quinn's earlier short film Come To (1998). He has also been involved with some of Duncan Sheik's theatrical works, including Whisper House, staged in San Diego in 2010.

=== With David Bowie ===
Leonard worked extensively with David Bowie, featuring on the studio albums Heathen (2002), Reality (2003) and The Next Day (2013). He toured with Bowie on the Heathen and Reality tours and was musical director for the Reality tour and DVD. He has the only original writing credits other than Bowie on The Next Day for the songs "Boss of Me" and "I'll Take You There."

Bowie and Leonard were introduced by Mark Plati, and Leonard first worked with Bowie on a track from the abandoned album Toy, which Plati was producing. He was able to cover the more unique guitar parts on older Bowie songs, such as those initially played by Robert Fripp or Adrian Belew. Leonard's first live appearance with Bowie was for the straight-through performance of the entirety of both Heathen and Low at the Roseland Ballroom in 2002.

In 2013, Leonard participated in an April Fools' Day spoof involving an announcement that Bowie would be representing Germany in that year's Eurovision Song Contest.

=== Personal work: Spooky Ghost ===
From 1987 to 1994, Gerry Leonard and Donal Coughlan worked together in Dublin, under the name "Hinterland". As a solo artist, Leonard works under the name Spooky Ghost, inspired by Coughlan's description of Leonard's guitar sound. Leonard worked on the first Spooky Ghost album from 1996 to 1998, recording it in his East Village apartment. The album, also titled Spooky Ghost, was primarily an exploration of ambient guitar atmospherics. A second Spooky Ghost album, The Light Machine, was released in 2002. On this recording, Spooky Ghost expanded to a trio, featuring Jay Bellerose (drums, percussion and tabla) and Paul Bryan (bass, keyboards and production). Both musicians had already contributed to Spooky Ghost and the trio is the band's live configuration. Bowie described The Light Machine as, "Quite the most beautiful and moving piece of work I have possessed in a long time." Frank Goodman called it a "sonically brave, and innovative, and challenging" work that enables the jaded listener to hear music again.

== Discography ==
=== Albums ===
- Hinterland – Kissing the Roof of Heaven (1990)
- Hinterland – Resurrect (1992)
- Spooky Ghost – Spooky Ghost (1998)
- Spooky Ghost – The Light Machine (2002)
- Spooky Ghost – Official Bootleg (2004; recorded live at The Chance, Poughkeepsie)
- Spooky Ghost – Official Bootleg, Volume 2 (2015; recording at Rockwood Music Hall, New York City)
- Spooky Ghost – Viral Times, Volume One (2020)
- Spooky Ghost – Viral Times, Volume Two (2020)
- Bowsie – Susan McKeown said a Bowsie record would come out in 2012, but it has not yet appeared.

=== Singles ===
- Hinterland – "Dark Hill" (1989)
- Hinterland – "Desert Boots" (1990)
- Hinterland – Resurrect EP (1992)
