= New Year (disambiguation) =

New Year is the time when a culture celebrates the end of one calendar year and the beginning of the next.

New Year, the New Year, or A New Year may also refer to:

== New Year observances ==
- New Year's Eve, December 31 in the Gregorian and Julian calendars, date in other calendars vary
- New Year's Day, January 1 in the Gregorian and Julian calendars, date in other calendars vary
- Lunar New Year, the first day of a year whose months are coordinated by the cycles of the moon
- Chinese New Year
  - Chinese New Year's Eve
- Islamic New Year (1 Muharram)
- Japanese New Year (1/2/3 January)
- Nowruz, Iranian or Persian New Year, celebrated on the spring equinox
- Old New Year also known as Orthodox New Year

== Film ==
- New Year (1924 film), a Chinese black-and-white animation by Cy Young
- New Year (1989 film), an Indian Malayalam-language film by Viji Thampi
- The New Year (film), a 2010 American comedy drama film by Brett Harley

== Literature ==
- New Year (novel), a 2018 novel by Juli Zeh

== Music ==
- The New Year (band), an American indie rock band formed in 1999
- New Year (opera), a 1989 opera by Michael Tippett

=== Albums ===
- The New Year (album), by the New Year, 2008
- New Year (EP), by A Silent Film, 2015

=== Songs ===
- "New Year" (song), by Sugababes, 2000
- "A New Year", by Annaleigh Ashford, 2016
- "The New Year" (song), by Death Cab for Cutie, 2004
- "New Year", by Beach House from Bloom, 2012
- "New Year", by the Breeders from Last Splash, 1993
- "New Year", by Regina Spektor from Remember Us to Life, 2016
- "New Year", by Six by Seven from The Closer You Get, 2000
- "New Year", by SVT, 1979

== See also ==
- New Year Island (disambiguation)
- New Year picture, a popular Banhua in China
- New Year tree, decorations similar to Christmas trees
- New Year's (disambiguation)
- New Year's Day (disambiguation)
- New Year's Eve (disambiguation)
- New Year's resolution, a commitment that an individual makes
- Happy New Year (disambiguation)
