= New Year's Eve (disambiguation) =

New Year's Eve is December 31 on the Gregorian calendar, the last day of the year and the eve of the next year.

New Year's Eve may also refer to:

== Film ==
- New Year's Eve (1924 film), a German silent film by Lupu Pick
- New Year's Eve (1929 film), an American lost silent film starring Mary Astor
- New Year's Eve (2002 film), a British short film by Col Spector
- New Year's Eve (2011 film), an American romantic comedy by Garry Marshall

== Television ==
- "New Year's Eve" (Louie), a 2012 episode
- "New Year's Eve" (Modern Family), a 2013 episode
- "New Year's Eve" (Up All Night), a 2012 episode
- "New Year's Eve", a 2018 episode of Baskets
- "New Year's Eve", a 2012 episode of Chitose Get You!!
- "New Year's Eve", a 2019 episode of The Complete Guide to Everything
- "New Year's Eve", a 2020 episode of Dash & Lily
- "New Year's Eve", an unaired episode of Happy Hour
- "New Year's Eve", a 1965 episode of Karen
- "New Year's Eve", a 1984 episode of Kate & Allie
- "New Year's Eve", a two-part 2019 episode of Liza on Demand
- "New Year's Eve", a 1995 episode of Mad About You
- "New Year's Eve", a 1996 episode of Ned & Stacey
- "New Year's Eve", a 2005 episode of Newlyweds: Nick and Jessica
- "New Year's Eve", a 2005 episode of Out of Practice
- "New Year's Eve", a 2010 episode of Peep Show
- "New Year's Eve", a 1997 episode of Relativity
- "New Year's Eve", a 1988 episode of She's the Sheriff
- "New Year's Eve", a 2009 episode of Table for 12
- "New Year's Eve", a 2021 episode of With Love

== Literature ==
- New Year's Eve/1929 (1967), a novel by James T. Farrell
- New Year's Eve (1988), a novel by Caroline B. Cooney
- New Year's Eve (1991), a novel by Janet Quin-Harkin
- New Year's Eve (1996), a novel by Lisa Grunwald
- New Year's Eve (2011), a novel by Marina Endicott
- New Year's Eve (2020), a novella by Heather Graham Pozzessere

== Music ==
- "New Year's Eve" (song), by Snoop Dogg, 2010
- "New Year's Eve", a song by Nightbirde, 2020
- "New Year's Eve", a song by Pale Waves from All the Things I Never Said, 2018

== See also ==
- New Year (disambiguation)
- New Year's (disambiguation)
- New Year's Day (disambiguation)
