= Harbour Lights =

Harbour Lights or Harbor Lights may refer to:

== Film ==
- The Harbour Lights (1914 film), a British silent film adaptation directed by Percy Nash
- The Harbour Lights (1923 film), a British silent film adaptation directed by Tom Terriss
- Harbour Lights, a 1960 animated film by Raoul Servais
- Harbor Lights (1963 film), a 1963 second feature directed by Maury Dexter

== Music ==
- "Harbour Lights" (song), a 1937 song by Hugh Williams (pseudonym for Will Grosz) with lyrics by Jimmy Kennedy
- Harbor Lights (Bruce Hornsby album), 1993
- Harbor Lights (Cristy Lane album), 1985
- "Harbor Lights", a track from the 1976 Boz Scaggs' album Silk Degrees
- "Harbour Lights", a track from the 2012 A Silent Film album Sand & Snow

== Other uses ==
- Harbour Lights (TV series), a British television drama about a harbourmaster, produced by the BBC and Valentine Productions from 1999 to 2000
- The Harbour Lights, a Victorian play by George R. Sims and Henry Pettitt
- Harbor Lights Pavilion, a music venue in Boston, Massachusetts, USA
