= A Silent Film (album) =

Studio album by A Silent Film
- Released: October 16, 2015
- Genres: Alternative rock, indie rock
- Length: 42:57
- Label: Silent Songs
- Producers: Robert Stevenson, Spencer Walker, Matthew Wilcox

A Silent Film chronology
Sand & Snow (2012)	A Silent Film (2015)

A Silent Film is the third full-length studio album by British alternative rock band A Silent Film. The album, released on 16 October 2015, was named eponymously and was released under the band's own label, Silent Songs.

== Track listing ==
No.	Title	Length
1.	"Something to Believe In"	3:02
2.	"Lightning Strike"	3:35
3.	"Chinese Lanterns"	4:15
4.	"I Don't Need a Reason"	3:15
5.	"Paralysed"	3:36
6.	"Evergreen"	4:55
7.	"Lake Swimming"	4:27
8.	"Lavender Fields"	3:35
9.	"Strong Enough"	4:33
10.	"Where Snowbirds Have Flown"	3:26
11.	"Losing Hand"	4:18
