= Lost in the Stars: Live at 54 Below =

Live album by Annaleigh Ashford
- Released: November 13, 2015
- Genre: Disco, pop, easy listening
- Length: 80:25
- Label: Broadway Records
- Producer: Annaleigh Ashford, Andy Jones, Will Van Dyke, Derik Lee

Singles from Lost in the Stars: Live at 54 Below
- 1. "One Night Only" Released: October 27, 2015

Lost in the Stars: Live at 54 Below is the debut album by American actress and singer Annaleigh Ashford, recorded live at 54 Below on multiple dates in 2014 and 2015. The album was released on November 13, 2015. Produced by Ashford, Andy Jones, Will Van Dyke, and Derik Lee, the album features Ashford with songwriter and music director Will Van Dyke and the Whiskey 5 band. It celebrates the classic cabaret with an eclectic mix of music from the disco days of Donna Summer, to the haunting melodies of Kurt Weill and Stephen Sondheim, to a sing-a-long of Alanis Morissette.

Prior to its release, "One Night Only", was made available as a promotional single through Playbill on October 27, 2015.

== Background and development ==
Inspired by classic live albums such as Patti LuPone at Les Mouches, Live at Last, and Sibling Revelry, Ashford's intent in creating this album was to emulate "a real, old-school, live cabaret recording." She elaborated further on the Theater People Podcast, saying:

"My intention in creating [the album] in the first place was to really celebrate the foundation of cabaret, which is true storytelling and song married into one. When we thought about doing an album, I said 'Well if we do one, it has to be live.' Surprisingly, it's really hard to make a live album these days. It's imperfect, and I think that is perfect."

The album is a compilation of two live shows. The first show recorded was in the Christmas season, but after initial recording, Ashford went on the road with the show, adding more material to replace the holiday themed songs. Feeling as though the holiday songs didn't make as much sense in the album, she went back with another audience to record the selected new material from the road to add to the album for a better overall fit.

== Critical reception ==
The album received positive reviews and support during its debut week. Josh Ferri of BroadwayBox gave the album "infinite praise", and dubbed Ashford "The New Queen of Disco". Ryan McPhee for Broadway.com called Ashford "an honorary child of the ‘70s", and said she "seamlessly blends her fantastical aesthetic with an appreciation of the vibrant history of the venue." He also praised the banter, calling it "equally captivating and unskippable with impeccable storytelling". EDGE Media Network's Steven Bergman called her a "highly recommended draw", and celebrated her "knack for patter" in her storytelling and ability to lead the audience in a karaoke rendition of Hand In My Pocket.

== Accolades ==
In 2016, Lost in the Stars: Live at 54 Below was nominated for two MAC Awards, an annual award ceremony to honor achievements in cabaret, comedy and jazz. The album was nominated for Best Song (Another Time), and Best Major Recording.

== Track list ==
No.	Title	Writer(s)	Length
1.	"Overture"	Will Van Dyke	1:05
2.	"One Night Only"	Tom Eyen; Henry Krieger	3:25
3.	"Donna Summer Medley"	Donna Summer; Pete Bellotte; Giorgio Moroder; Keith Forsey; Harold Faltermeyer; Eddie Hokenson; Bruce Sudano; Joe "Bean" Esposito; Michael Omartian; Jimmy Webb; Paul Jabara; Bruce Roberts	6:49
4.	"'Welcome To 54 Below...'"	Annaleigh Ashford	1:30
5.	"Love Hurts"	Felice and Boudleaux Bryant	3:18
6.	"Someone Like You/Crazy"	Adele; Dan Wilson; Brian Burton; Thomas Callaway; Gian Franco Reverberi; Gian Piero Reverberi	4:18
7.	"'What A Great Holiday Song...'"	Ashford	2:02
8.	"Date With Myself"	Breedlove	3:55
9.	"Another Time"	Van Dyke	3:40
10.	"'Miss Kitt...'"	Ashford	12:24
11.	"Come Rain or Come Shine"	Johnny Mercer	4:41
12.	"Hand In My Pocket"	Alanis Morissette; Glen Ballard	5:33
13.	"'Famous Voices...'"	Ashford	3:27
14.	"Good Enough"	Cyndi Lauper; Stephen Broughton Lunt; Arthur Stead	2:31
15.	"Another Hundred People/Mona Lisas And Mad Hatters"	Stephen Sondheim; Elton John; Bernie Taupin	4:52
16.	"'Thank You...'"	Ashford	1:07
17.	"Last Dance"	Jabara	3:23
18.	"For Good"	Stephen Schwartz	4:50
19.	"Lost in the Stars"	Kurt Weill; Maxwell Anderson	3:44
Total length:			80:25

== Credits and personnel ==
Management

- Recorded live at 54 Below

Personnel

- Michael Aarons – guitar
- Mills Agency – marketing director, press, social media
- Annaleigh Ashford – lead vocals, production, kazoo
- Alec Berlin – guitar
- Emily Brestovansky – executive assistant
- Van Dean – president of Broadway Records
- Andrew Farber, Esq – legal
- Steve Gilewski – bass guitar, photography, design
- Andrew Hendrick – executive assistant
- Mason Ingram – drums
- Beth Rosner – management
- Alison Seidner – cello
- Brian Usifer – orchestrations
- Will Van Dyke – production, arrangement/orchestrations, vocals
- Oscar Zambrano – mastering
- Deidre Alby – director of marketing
- Keith Sherman & Associates – public relations
- Steven Baruch – proprietor
- Dave C. Frankel – original 54 Below logo design
- Richard Frankel – proprietor
- KJ Hardy – production manager
- Amanda Raymond – engineering
- Marc Routh – proprietor
- Jennifer Ashley Tepper – director of programming
- Tom Viertel – proprietor

Credits and personnel adapted from Lost in the Stars: Live at 54 Below liner notes.

== Release history ==
Country	Date	Format	Label
United States	November 13, 2015	CD, digital download	Broadway Records
