= The City That Never Sleeps =

The City That Never Sleeps may refer to:

- The City That Never Sleeps (nickname), New York or other cities
- The City That Never Sleeps (film), silent 1924 drama
- City That Never Sleeps, a 1953 film noir
- The City That Never Sleeps: Shinjuku Shark or Nemuranai Machi: Shinjuku Same, 1993 Japanese film
- The City That Never Sleeps, 2013 episode of the American television series Blue Bloods
- The City That Never Sleeps, 1993 book of artwork by Archer Prewitt
- Marvel's Spider-Man: The City That Never Sleeps, downloadable content for the 2018 video game Spider-Man

== See also ==
- The City That Sleeps, rock album
