= Lost Star =

Lost Star or Lost Stars may refer to:

== Literature ==
- The Lost Stars (2012–2016), the military science fiction book series by John G. Hemry under the pen name Jack Campbell
- Star Wars: Lost Stars, a 2015 young adult science fiction novel by Claudia Gray
- Lost Stars, a 2019 novel in the Warriors: The Broken Code series by Erin Hunter

== Music ==
- "Lost Stars", a 2014 original song performed by Maroon 5 frontman Adam Levine
- The Lost Star, a 2010 album by The Orchids

== Other uses ==
- Alex Kidd: The Lost Stars, a 1986 arcade game
- The Raccoons and the Lost Star ("The Lost Star"), a 1983 animated telefilm in The Racoons fictional universe
- Rupert and the Lost Stars ("The Lost Stars"), a 2006 TV episode of Rupert Bear, Follow the Magic...
- The Lost Star (French: L'Etoile Perdue), an 1884 painting by William-Adolphe Bouguereau of Merope the Pleiad

== See also ==
- Lost (disambiguation)
- Star (disambiguation)
- Lost in the Stars (disambiguation)
