= Annaleigh Ashford =

American actress, singer, and dancer (b. 1985)

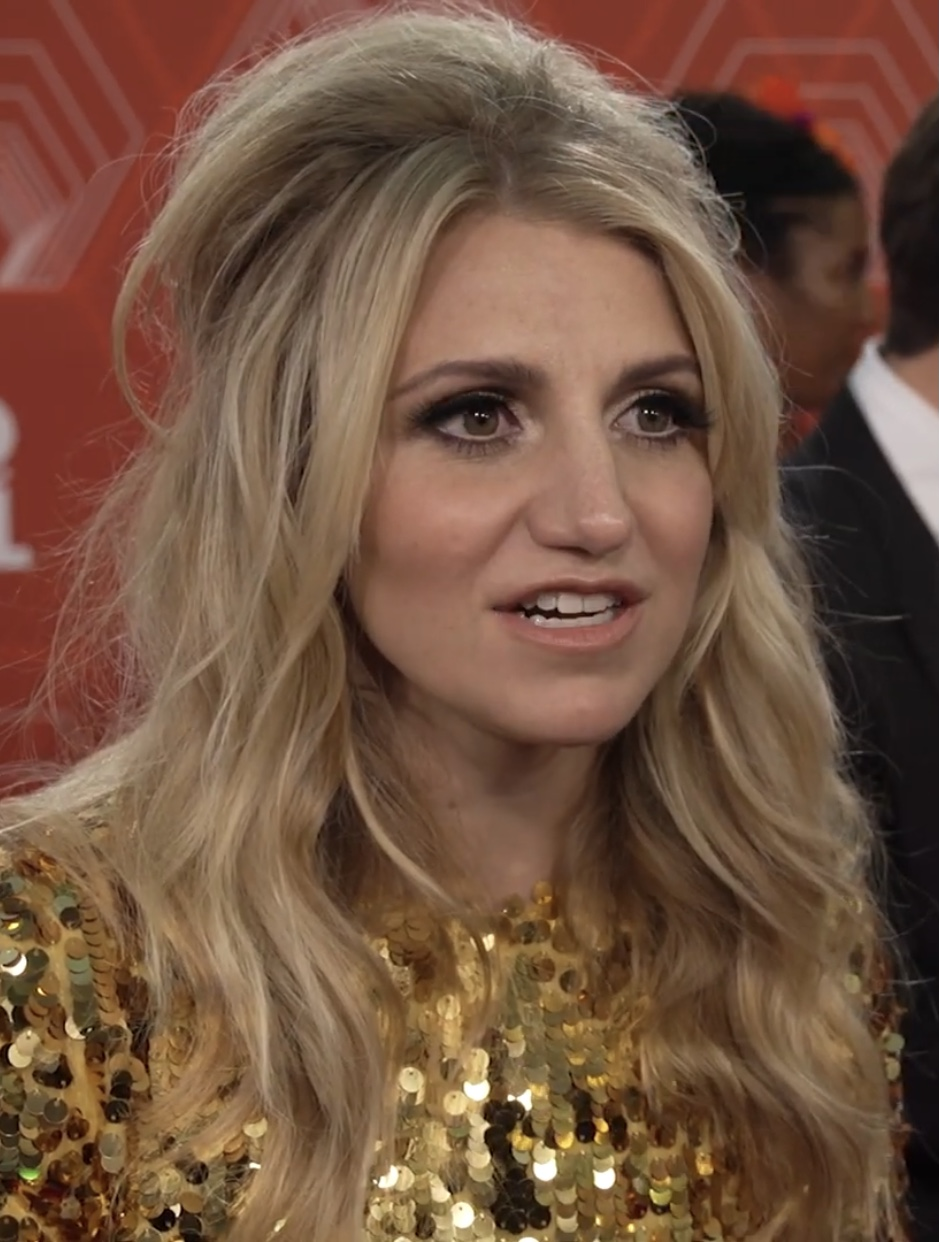
- Ashford in 2021
- Born: June 25, 1985 (age 41); Denver, Colorado, U.S.
- Education: Marymount Manhattan College (BFA)
- Occupations: Actress, singer, dancer
- Years active: 2005–present
- Spouse: Joe Tapper (m. 2013)
- Children: 2
- Musical career
- Genres: Easy listening; pop; Broadway
- Instrument: Vocals
- Labels: Broadway; independent artist

Annaleigh Ashford (née Swanson; born June 25, 1985) is a Tony Award-winning, Grammy and Emmy-nominated actress, singer, dancer, and producer, known for work in film, television, and theatre. She starred in the Broadway revivals of Sunday in the Park with George (2017) and Sweeney Todd: The Demon Barber of Fleet Street (2023), for which she received a Tony Award nomination for playing Mrs. Lovett. She earned a Primetime Emmy Award nomination for her performance as Irene in the Hulu limited series Welcome to Chippendales (2022).

Ashford’s notable film and television credits include Showtime period drama Masters of Sex (2013–2016), the Netflix miniseries Unbelievable (2019), the HBO film Bad Education (2019), the FX drama Impeachment: American Crime Story (2021) and leading the CBS sitcom B Positive (2020–2022).

She received the Tony Award for Best Featured Actress in a Play for playing Essie Carmichael in You Can't Take It with You (2014–2015), and was also Tony-nominated for creating the role of Lauren in Kinky Boots (2013). Her early roles on Broadway include the musicals Wicked (2007), Legally Blonde (2007), and Hair (2010). She received her first Grammy nomination in the category Best Musical Theater Album for the 2023 Broadway revival cast recording of Sweeney Todd: The Demon Barber of Fleet Street. She released her debut album Lost in the Stars: Live at 54 Below in 2015.

== Early life ==
Ashford was born on June 25, the daughter of Holli Swanson, an elementary school gym teacher, and Chris Swanson, a small-business owner. She began practicing dance at Kit Andrée's Dance and Performing Arts Center in the second grade. She acted and sang in numerous performances and competitions in her hometown. Ashford's professional career began at age nine in Denver, when she was cast as Tina Denmark, the lead in the musical Ruthless!. At fourteen, she was profiled as "The Teen to Watch" by the Rocky Mountain News. Other Denver credits include appearing in the ensemble of The Sound of Music, West Side Story, and Paint Your Wagon, as well as in Little Women as Amy March, Rodgers and Hammerstein's Cinderella as Ella, Grease as Sandy Dumbrowski, and Anything Goes as Reno Sweeney. She graduated from Wheat Ridge High School in three years, at the age of 16, and then attended Marymount Manhattan College, where she earned a degree in theatre in another three years, at the age of 19. While attending Marymount Manhattan College, Ashford played Rosa Bud in The Mystery of Edwin Drood and Emma in Tell Me on a Sunday.

== Career ==
=== 2004–2009: Early roles and Broadway debut ===
In 2004, while hanging around in New York City's Lower East Side club scene, Ashford met nightlife personality Lady Starlight, a local rock DJ and performance artist. Lady Starlight invited Ashford to dance at her 1970s glitter rock party "Lady Starlight's English Disco" and christened her Hollywood Starr. Ashford performed in Tom Kitt and Brian Yorkey's Feeling Electric as Natalie at the New York Musical Theatre Festival in 2005.

Soon after graduating from college, Ashford got her big break performing as one of Glinda's friends, Pfanne, and understudying the role of Glinda on the first national tour of Wicked. She joined the cast in December 2005 and left in September 2006. She then originated the role of Margot in Legally Blonde: The Musical, her Broadway debut. She understudied the lead role of Elle Woods, but only played it once. She was featured on the original cast recording and appeared in the MTV televised airing. Ashford left the show in September 2007. In July 2007, she worked on a musical adaptation of Catch Me If You Can as Brenda Strong. She previously did a staged reading for the project under the director of Hairspray, Jack O'Brien.

Ashford then returned to Wicked, this time playing the lead role of Glinda in the Broadway production. She replaced Kendra Kassebaum on October 9, 2007. She departed the company on May 11, 2008, when Kassebaum returned to the role, and transferred to the Chicago production, replacing Kate Fahrner as Glinda on June 3, 2008. She played her final performance as Glinda on January 25, 2009, when the Chicago production closed. In 2008, she made her film debut with a small part in Sex and the City: The Movie playing a "spoiled label queen". That same year she also appeared in the Jonathan Demme film Rachel Getting Married starring Anne Hathaway. Ashford played a counter girl.

In 2009, it was announced that Ashford would be one of the principal characters and singers in the new vaudeville styled Cirque du Soleil show, Banana Shpeel. However, it was later announced that Ashford and her colleague Michael Longoria were no longer in the cast of the show. Publicists announced that it was a creative decision to remove large portions of dialogue from the show, therefore making their characters non-existent. Ashford was originally slated to stay in the production from its premiere in Chicago until sometime in 2010.

=== 2010–2015: Established career ===
Ashford starred as Jeanie in the Broadway revival of Hair. She succeeded Kacie Sheik in the role from March 9, 2010, through June 27, 2010, when the production closed. In September 2010, Ashford played Veronica Sawyer in a concert version of the new musical Heathers in New York City. The role was later played by Barrett Wilbert Weed in the 2014 off-Broadway premiere. In November 2010, Ashford was part of a reading of the musical Carrie.

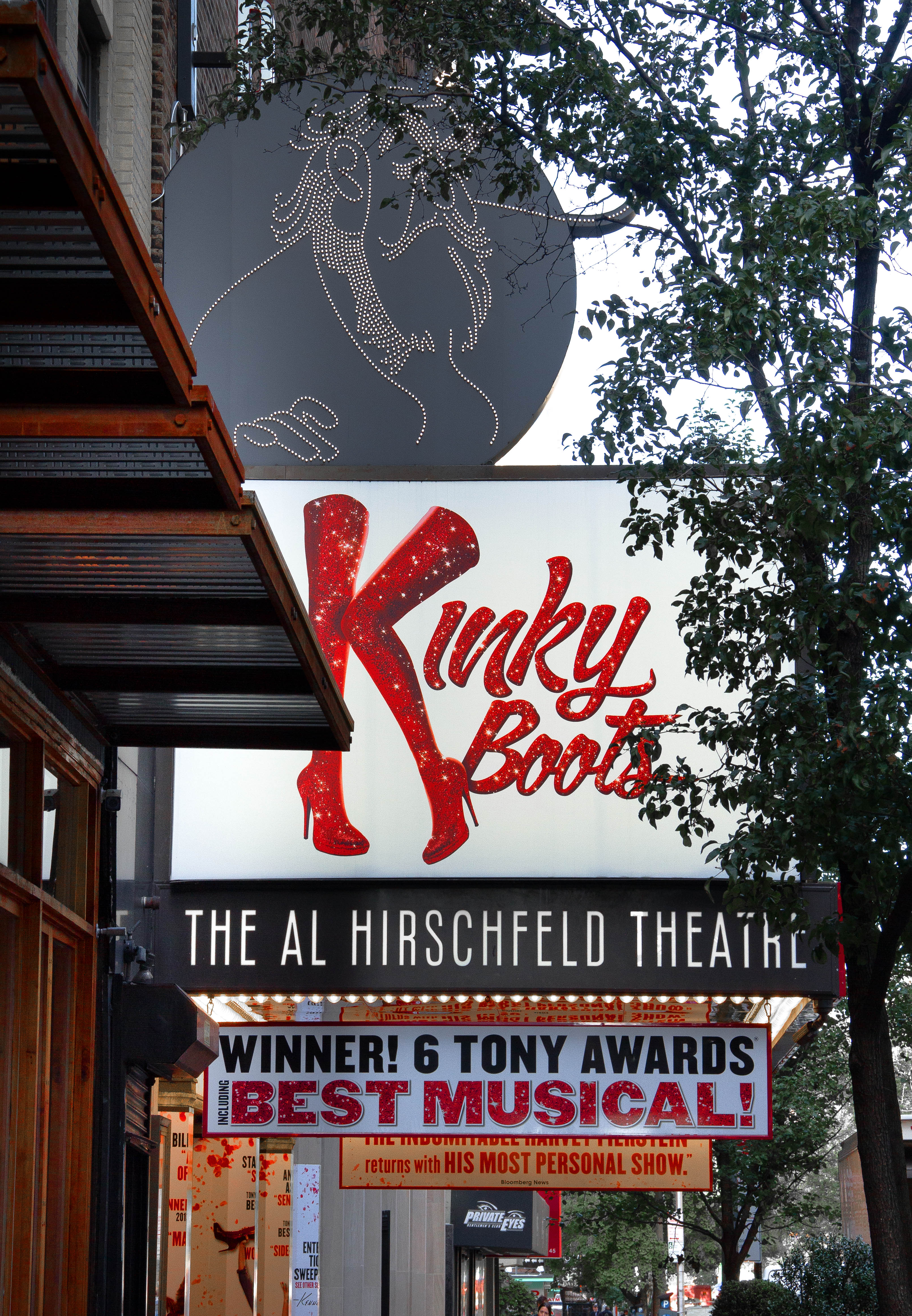
Kinky Boots at the Al Hirschfeld Theatre (2013)

In January 2012, Ashford ended her run playing Maureen Johnson in the Off-Broadway revival of Rent, which began July 14, 2011 and closed on September 9, 2012. Emma Hunton replaced Ashford as Maureen on January 13, 2012. In February 2012, Ashford made a cameo on Smash as Lisa McMann and returned for another short appearance in 2013 before the show's cancellation. From June 27 to August 19, 2012, she appeared in the Off-Broadway musical Dogfight, based on the 1991 film of the same name, playing a toothless hooker named Marcy. The role was played in the film by Elizabeth Daily. Ashford also performed on the original cast recording of the musical. In 2013, Ashford provided the voice of a troll in Frozen. She has a short line greeting Kristoff and sings the second female solo after Maia Wilson in the song "Fixer Upper" for the soundtrack.

In 2013, after appearing in the Chicago try-outs, Ashford reprised her role as Lauren in the Broadway production of Kinky Boots, a musical with a book by Harvey Fierstein and music and lyrics by Cyndi Lauper. Variety described Ashford's performance as "sensational", and noted that she was "the only one in the entire cast, by the way, to manage a convincingly impenetrable working-class English accent." For this role, Ashford received nominations for the Tony Award for Best Featured Actress in a Musical and the Drama Desk Award for Outstanding Featured Actress in a Musical. Ashford left her role in Kinky Boots on March 2, 2014. That same year, Ashford appeared in the recurring role of young sex worker Betty DiMello in season one of the Showtime series Masters of Sex. Her part was upgraded from a recurring to regular for Season 2.

Beginning on August 26, 2014, Ashford played the role of Essie Carmichael in the Broadway revival of You Can't Take It with You, directed by Scott Ellis. She appeared alongside Rose Byrne, James Earl Jones, and Elizabeth Ashley. The show closed on February 2, 2015. For this role, Ashford won the 2015 Tony Award for Best Featured Actress in a Play. In a limited run from October 2, 2015, to January 3, 2016, Ashford starred as the titular canine in the first Broadway production of A. R. Gurney's comedy Sylvia. The show opened at the Cort Theatre on October 27, 2015. Directed by Daniel J. Sullivan, the show also starred Julie White, Matthew Broderick, and Robert Sella. Tony Award-winning director Daniel Sullivan compared Ashford to Bill Irwin, writing, "she is a great clown, aside from being a wonderful actor...she has that same kind of, just throw it up there, keep trying, finding it, and refining it." Ashford's debut album Lost in the Stars: Live at 54 Below was released November 13, 2015. On November 17, 2015, it was announced that Ashford had signed with talent agency ICM Partners. On November 30, 2015, Ashford played eight roles in a reading of Paul Rudnick's critically acclaimed play Jeffrey, directed by Christopher Ashley.

=== 2016–present: Career expansion ===
On February 1, 2016, it was announced that Ashford would play the role of Columbia in the FOX television remake The Rocky Horror Picture Show: Let's Do the Time Warp Again. Ashford starred alongside Laverne Cox, Victoria Justice, and Ryan McCartan.

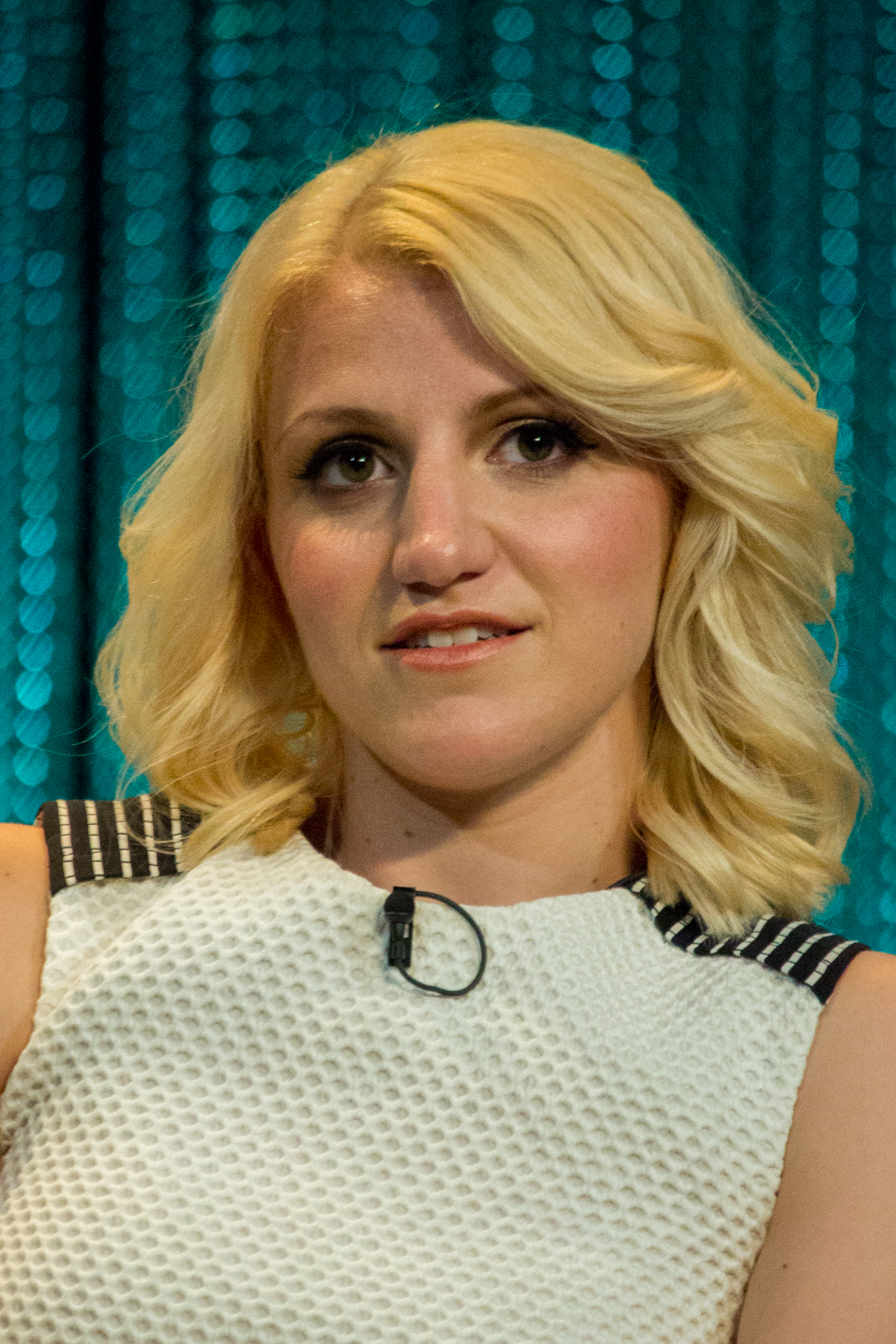
Ashford at PaleyFest (2014)

On July 14, 2016, it was announced that Ashford would be starring opposite Jake Gyllenhaal in New York City Center's three October concert performances of Sunday in the Park with George as Dot/Marie, a role originated by Bernadette Peters on Broadway. On December 13, 2016, it was announced that Ashford would reprise her role as Dot/Marie opposite Gyllenhaal in Sunday in the Park with George in the show's Broadway 10-week revival at the Hudson Theater. Ashford was not eligible for a Tony Award for this performance, as the production withdrew itself from any award competition, including the Tony Awards.

David Rooney of The Hollywood Reporter praised her work writing, "Ashford is the funniest Dot in memory", noting "her mischievous humor and openness [plays] a delicate counterpoint to Gyllenhaal’s Seurat...But there are tremendously moving layers to her characterization too, revealing the searing wound beneath the pride" Marilyn Stasio of Variety also praised Ashford writing that she has a "stunning voice and [was] quite enchanting". In 2017 the cast album was released by Warner Music Group. It was produced and mixed by Bart Migal and features the full Broadway company, including Jake Gyllenhaal, Robert Sean Leonard, Erin Davie, and Penny Fuller.

On April 4, 2017, it was announced that Ashford would be joining The Public Theater's Shakespeare in the Park production of A Midsummer Night's Dream as Helena. The production also co-starred Phylicia Rashad as Titania, Kristine Nielsen as Puck and Danny Burstein as Nick Bottom. The production received mixed responses but Ashford was praised. Elizabeth Vincentelli of Newsday wrote, "[Ashford] has emerged as a sublimely gifted comedienne. She [has] impeccable timing with delightfully unexpected line readings."

On September 12, 2017, it was announced that Ashford would join the cast of Woody Allen's drama film A Rainy Day in New York, which was completed on October 23, 2017. The film was released in Europe, Asia, Central America, and South America in 2019 and in the UK and US in 2020. On November 3, 2017, it was announced that Ashford would make her New York Philharmonic debut in a televised New Year's Eve concert celebrating the music of Leonard Bernstein. Also featuring Laura Osnes, Aaron Tveit, and Christopher Jackson, New Year’s Eve: Bernstein on Broadway featured songs from Bernstein's scores for On the Town, West Side Story, Candide, and Wonderful Town. It was accompanied by Bramwell Tovey and aired on PBS on December 31, 2017.

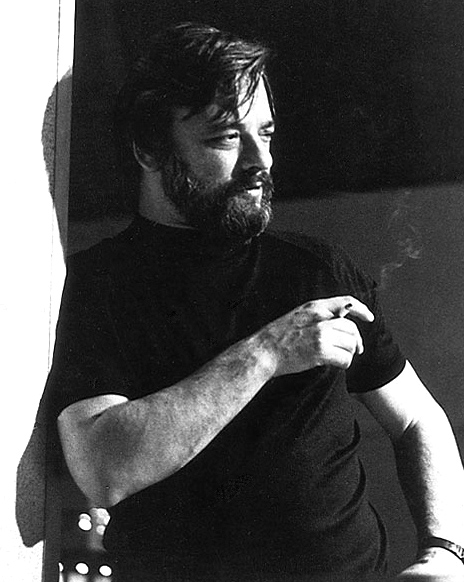
Ashford starred in two major revivals of Stephen Sondheim musicals

Ashford appeared as Elizabeth Cote in four episodes of the mini-series The Assassination of Gianni Versace: American Crime Story, which premiered on January 17, 2018. On February 15, 2018, it was announced that Ashford would lead a single-camera comedy pilot Southern Hospitality for ABC. Tristram Shapeero was set to direct. The pilot was not picked up. Ashford co-starred in the Jennifer Lopez-led comedy film Second Act as Hildy, opposite Vanessa Hudgens. The film was released in 2018. On July 23, 2018, it was announced that Ashford would be starring in American Reject, a new musical film. Ashford was set to reprise her role as Dot/Marie in Sunday in the Park with George at the Savoy Theatre in London in 2020. However, due to the COVID-19 pandemic, the run was postponed to 2021. In February 2020, Ashford was cast as one of the two main lead roles for the CBS situation comedy B Positive, in which she plays Gina, an unstable woman who is the perfect match for a person in need of a kidney, who happens to be a divorced father who she knows from the past. For its second season, the series was revamped and centered on Ashford's character. Ashford also performed the series' lengthy opening theme in a musical-theater style. The final episode aired March 10, 2022. The series was greenlit by CBS on May 8, 2020, as an entry in the 2020–21 television season.

In 2021 she played Paula Jones in the Ryan Murphy limited drama series American Crime Story: Impeachment on FX. The role, a departure from her comedic roles, was a serious one that demanded a physical transformation. Ashford did not meet with the real-life figure but heavily relied on the wealth of material available. She said "I can have empathy for the fact that she came from a very conservative family...I also have a great deal of empathy for the way the media treated her and the way she was seduced by right-wing operatives to make certain choices at the same time." The following year she played Irene in the Hulu limited series Welcome to Chippendales. She starred alongside Kumail Nanjiani, Murray Bartlett, and Juliette Lewis.

In 2023, she returned to Broadway in the revival of Stephen Sondheim's Sweeney Todd: The Demon Barber of Fleet Street taking on the role of Mrs. Lovett opposite Josh Groban as the titular character. She earned rave reviews for her performance, including praise of her vocal abilities and her comedic timing, with many stating she made the role her own and distinguished herself from Angela Lansbury who originated the role. She received her third Tony Award nomination, this time for Best Actress in a Musical. She also earned her first Grammy Award nomination for Best Musical Theater Album for her performance on the cast album. It was announced on October 14, 2023, that Ashford's final performance as Mrs. Lovett would be on January 14, 2024. Later that month, it was announced that Sutton Foster would succeed Ashford as Mrs. Lovett starting on February 9, 2024.

In February 2025, Ashford joined the Broadway cast of All In: A Comedy About Love alongside Lin Manuel-Miranda, Hank Azaria, Tim Meadows, and David Cross.

== Personal life ==
Ashford has celiac disease, and therefore maintains a strict gluten-free diet.

Ashford and fellow actor Joe Tapper were married at the Devil's Thumb Ranch in Tabernash, Colorado, on July 29, 2013. On May 11, 2016, People reported that Ashford was pregnant with their first child, a boy. Ashford and Tapper's son was born in 2016. In October 2024, it was announced by People that Ashford and Tapper’s second child, a daughter, was born.

== Acting credits ==
=== Theatre ===
Year	Production	Role	Venue	Notes
2005	Feeling Electric (Note: Early version of Next to Normal)	Natalie Brown	New York Musical Theatre	Festival
2005–2006	Wicked	Pfannee (replacement) (Note: Understudy for Glinda)	First National Tour	Tour
2007	Legally Blonde	Margot (Note: Understudy for Elle Woods)	Golden Gate Theatre	San Francisco
2007	Legally Blonde	Margot	Palace Theatre	Broadway
2007–2009	Wicked	Glinda (replacement)	Gershwin Theatre	Broadway
2010	Hair	Jeanie (replacement)	Al Hirschfeld Theatre	Broadway
2010	Heathers	Veronica Sawyer	Joe's Pub	Off-Broadway
2011–2012	Rent	Maureen Johnson	New World Stages	Off-Broadway
2012	Dogfight	Marcy	Second Stage Theatre	Off-Broadway
2012	Kinky Boots	Lauren	Bank of America Theatre	Chicago
2012	Assassins	Lynette "Squeaky" Fromme	Studio 54	Broadway
2013–2014	Kinky Boots	Lauren	Al Hirschfeld Theatre	Broadway
2014–2015	You Can't Take It with You	Essie Carmichael	Longacre Theatre	Broadway
2015–2016	Sylvia	Sylvia	Cort Theatre	Broadway
2016–2017	Sunday in the Park with George	Dot/Marie	New York City Center	Off-Broadway
2016–2017	Sunday in the Park with George	Dot/Marie	Hudson Theatre	Broadway
2017	A Midsummer Night's Dream	Helena	Delacorte Theater	Off-Broadway
2023	Gutenberg! The Musical!	The Producer (one night only)	James Earl Jones Theatre	Broadway
2023–2024	Sweeney Todd: The Demon Barber of Fleet Street	Mrs. Lovett	Lunt-Fontanne Theatre	Broadway
2024	The Imaginary Invalid	Toinette	Florence Gould Hall	Staged reading
2025	All In: Comedy About Love	Performer	Hudson Theatre	Broadway
2026	Triumph	Iris	Shiva Theatre at the Public	Off-Broadway

=== Film ===
Year	Title	Role
2008	Sex and the City	Spoiled Label Queen
2008	Rachel Getting Married	Quick Stop Cashier
2013	Frozen	Girl Troll (voice)
2014	Top Five	Michele
2016	Better Off Single	Anne
2016	Love on the Run	Liza
2017	Unicorn Store	Crystal
2018	Second Act	Hildy Ostrander
2019	Late Night	Mimi Mismatch
2019	A Rainy Day in New York	Lily
2019	Bad Education	Jenny Aquila
2022	American Reject	Nano
2024	Hold Your Breath	Esther Smith

=== Television ===
Year	Title	Role	Notes
2007	Legally Blonde: The Musical	Margot	MTV telecast
2009	Haute & Bothered	Mckenzie	Web series, lead role
2010	Law & Order	Mia	Episode: "Immortal"
2010, 2012	Submissions Only	Adorable Girl	Recurring role
2011	The Big C	Chloe	Episode: "Cats and Dogs"
2012	Nurse Jackie	Cori	Episode: "Kettle-Kettle-Black-Black"
2012	A Gifted Man	Shauna	Episode: "In Case of Complications"
2012	Made in Jersey	Jackie	Episode: "Pilot"
2012, 2013	Smash	Lisa McMann	2 episodes
2013	Law & Order: Special Victims Unit	Lindsay Anderson	Episode: "October Surprise"
2013	Watch What Happens Live	Herself / Bartender	Episode: "Harvey Fierstein & Kim Zolciak"
2013	87th Annual Macy's Thanksgiving Day Parade	Herself / Lauren	Performed with the cast of Kinky Boots
2013–2016	Masters of Sex	Betty DiMello	Lead role
2015	Celebrity Name Game	Herself	4 episodes
2016	Pleasant Events	Maddie	Episode: "Who Let the Groom Out?"
2016	The Rocky Horror Picture Show: Let's Do the Time Warp Again	Columbia	Television film
2017	New Year’s Eve: Bernstein on Broadway	Herself	New Year's Eve concert special
2018	The Assassination of Gianni Versace: American Crime Story	Elizabeth Cote	Recurring role
2018, 2019	God Friended Me	Fliss	2 episodes
2019	Younger	Shelly Rozansky	Recurring role
2019	Unbelievable	Lily	Recurring role
2019	Evil	Bridget Farrell	Episode: "Vatican III"
2019	John Mulaney & the Sack Lunch Bunch	Crying Lady	Television special
2020	The Good Fight	Roisin Orbinson	2 episodes
2020	The Undoing	Alexis Young	Episode: "The Missing"
2020–2022	B Positive	Gina Dabrowski	Lead role
2021	Q-Force	Vox Tux (voice)	Episode: "EuropeVision"
2021	Impeachment: American Crime Story	Paula Jones	Lead role
2022	Big Mouth	The Rice Purity Test (voice)	Episode: "Rice Purity Test"
2022	Welcome to Chippendales	Irene Banerjee	Main cast
2025	Happy Face	Melissa Moore	Main cast
2025	Elsbeth	Sharon Norman	Episode: "Ick, a Bod"
2026	Stumble	Jolene Tittel	2 episodes
2026	Mating Season	Addy (voice)	2 episodes
TBA	The Off Weeks	Jade	Upcoming miniseries

== Discography ==
- 2007: Legally Blonde (Original Broadway Cast Recording)
- 2013: Dogfight (Original Cast Recording)
- 2013: "Love Me Back" – single (with Richard Hall)
- 2013: "Stand Beside Me" – single (with Richard Hall)
- 2013: Kinky Boots (Original Broadway Cast Recording)
- 2013: Frozen (Original Motion Picture Soundtrack)
- 2014: "Another Time (Andrew's Song)" – single (with Will Van Dyke)
- 2014: Ahrens & Flaherty: Nice Fighting You (A 30th Anniversary Celebration Live at 54 Below)
- 2015: Lost in the Stars: Live at 54 Below
- 2016: The Rocky Horror Picture Show: Let's Do the Time Warp Again
- 2016: "A New Year" – single (with Will Van Dyke & Jeff Talbott)
- 2017: Sunday in the Park with George (2017 New Broadway Cast Recording)
- 2019: John Mulaney & the Sack Lunch Bunch
- 2020: Thankful: An Album for Jerad Bortz
- 2021: "Theme (From B Positive)" - single
- 2022: Super Songs of Big Mouth, Vol. 2 (Music from the Netflix Series)
- 2023: Sweeney Todd: The Demon Barber of Fleet Street (2023 New Broadway Cast Recording)

=== Concerts ===
On April 7, 2008, Ashford made her professional cabaret debut as a part of the Broadway at Birdland series at Birdland Jazz Club. She performed an early version of what has now become her critically acclaimed Lost in the Stars show. Many songs from her debut, including "Love Hurts", "Mona Lisas and Mad Hatters", and the titular song, "Lost in the Stars", stayed with the show and are now featured on her live album. Alex Lacamoire served as her musical director.

In February 2014, Ashford made her 54 Below concert debut with her now acclaimed cabaret show, Lost in the Stars. After two sold-out shows on the 3rd of the month, Ashford added an encore performance due to popular demand. She returned to 54 Below for a special Christmas-themed reincarnation of her cabaret act for the first two Mondays of December with "a little more holiday cheer involved". She was reviewed by Stephen Holden of The New York Times for her show on December 1. On February 11, 2015, it was announced that Ashford would be joined by Van Dyke and The Whiskey Five band in a tour of her acclaimed cabaret show in five cities. In addition to her February 11 return to 54 Below, she also played in Chicago, San Francisco, Las Vegas, and two special shows in her hometown of Denver, Colorado.

On August 30, 2015, Ashford had a secret popup Brunch With Annaleigh: The Concert at 54 Below, which was an extension of the Lost in the Stars show. This concert was recorded to serve as part of Ashford's debut album, which is a compilation of multiple New York City dates at 54 Below in 2014 and 2015.

Ashford's debut album, Lost in the Stars: Live at 54 Below, recorded from her stage show, was released November 13, 2015.

Ashford returned to 54 Below for a New Year's Eve special, Lost in the Stars: New Year's Magic. On November 26, 2015, Lost in the Stars was nominated for a BroadwayWorld Cabaret Award in the category "Best Show, Celebrity Female". On September 13, 2016, it was announced that Ashford would once again return to 54 Below for an updated version of Lost in the Stars: New Year's Magic.

Tour dates
Date	City	Country	Venue
February 3, 2014	New York, New York	United States	54 Below
February 15, 2014	New York, New York	United States	54 Below
December 1, 2014	New York, New York	United States	54 Below
December 8, 2014	New York, New York	United States	54 Below
February 11, 2015	New York, New York	United States	54 Below
March 21, 2015	Chicago, Illinois	United States	The Broadway Playhouse
April 11, 2015	Denver, Colorado	United States	The Denver Center
April 12, 2015	Denver, Colorado	United States	The Denver Center
April 19, 2015	San Francisco, California	United States	The Venetian Room
June 27, 2015	Las Vegas, Nevada	United States	The Smith Center
June 28, 2015	Las Vegas, Nevada	United States	The Smith Center
August 30, 2015	New York, New York	United States	54 Below
January 31, 2015	New York, New York	United States	54 Below
April 17, 2016	Overland Park, Kansas	United States	Yardley Hall
January 31, 2016	New York, New York	United States	54 Below
April 29, 2018	San Francisco, California	United States	The Venetian Room

== Awards and nominations ==
Organizations	Year	Award	Category	Result	Ref.
Broadway.com Audience Choice Awards	2008	Favorite Replacement (Female)	Wicked	Nominated	
Broadway.com Audience Choice Awards	2010	Favorite Replacement (Female)	Hair	Nominated	
Broadway.com Audience Choice Awards	2013	Favorite Actress in a Musical	Kinky Boots	Nominated	
Broadway.com Audience Choice Awards	2013	Favorite Funny Performance	Kinky Boots	Won	
Broadway.com Audience Choice Awards	2015	Favorite Featured Actress in a Play	You Can't Take It With You	Won	
Broadway.com Audience Choice Awards	2015	Favorite Funny Performance	You Can't Take It With You	Nominated	
Broadway.com Audience Choice Awards	2016	Favorite Featured Actress in a Play	Sylvia	Nominated	
Broadway.com Audience Choice Awards	2016	Favorite Funny Performance	Sylvia	Nominated	
Broadway.com Audience Choice Awards	2017	Favorite Leading Actress in a Musical	Sunday in the Park with George	Nominated	
Broadway.com Audience Choice Awards	2017	Favorite Onstage Pair (with Jake Gyllenhaal)	Sunday in the Park with George	Nominated	
Brooklyn Web Fest Awards	2016	Best Supporting Actress	Pleasant Events	Nominated	
Chita Rivera Award	2015	Best Female Dancer	You Can't Take It With You	Nominated	
Clarence Derwent Awards	2013	Most Promising Female Performer	Kinky	Won	
Drama Desk Awards	2013	Outstanding Featured Actress in a Musical	Kinky Boots	Nominated	
Drama Desk Awards	2015	Outstanding Featured Actress in a Play	You Can't Take It With You	Won	
Drama Desk Awards	2023	Outstanding Lead Performance in a Musical	Sweeney Todd: The Demon Barber of Fleet Street	Won	
Drama League Awards	2011	Distinguished Performance Award	Rent	Nominated	
Drama League Awards	2016	Distinguished Performance Award	Sylvia	Nominated	
Drama League Awards	2018	Distinguished Performance Award	A Midsummer Night's Dream	Nominated	
Drama League Awards	2023	Distinguished Performance Award	Sweeney Todd: The Demon Barber of Fleet Street	Won	
Emmy Awards (Primetime)	2023	Outstanding Supporting Actress in a Limited Series or Movie	Welcome to Chippendales	Nominated	
Grammy Awards	2024	Best Musical Theater Album	Sweeney Todd: The Demon Barber of Fleet Street	Nominated	
MAC Awards	2016	Best Song	Another Time (Andrew's Song)	Nominated	
MAC Awards	2016	Best Major Recording	Lost in the Stars: Live at 54 Below	Nominated	
Outer Critics Circle Awards	2013	Outstanding Featured Actress in a Musical	Kinky Boots	Nominated	
Outer Critics Circle Awards	2015	Outstanding Featured Actress in a Play	You Can't Take It With You	Won	
Tony Awards	2013	Best Featured Actress in a Musical	Kinky Boots	Nominated	
Tony Awards	2015	Best Featured Actress in a Play	You Can't Take It With You	Won	
Tony Awards	2023	Best Leading Actress in a Musical	Sweeney Todd: The Demon Barber of Fleet Street	Nominated	
