= New Year's =

New Year's is a colloquial term with unclear definition and may refer to:

- New Year, the beginning of the calendar year
- New Year's Eve, the last day of the Gregorian calendar year
  - Hogmanay, Scottish celebration of New Year
- New Year's Day, the first day of the year in the Gregorian calendar

== See also ==
- New Year's Day (disambiguation)
- New Year (disambiguation)
- Happy New Year (disambiguation)
- Up Helly Aa
- New Year's resolution
- Christmas and holiday season
