= Lost in the Stars =

Lost in the Stars may also refer to:

- Lost in the Stars (1949 musical), a 1949 musical based on the 1948 novel Cry, the Beloved Country
- Lost in the Stars: The Music of Kurt Weill, a 1985 tribute album
- Lost in the Stars (1974 film), a 1974 film based on the 1949 musical
- Lost in the Stars: Live at 54 Below, a 2015 album by Annaleigh Ashford
- Lost in the Stars (2022 film), a 2022 Chinese film
