= New Year (EP) =

EP by A Silent Film
- Released: April 15, 2015
- Genre: Alternative rock, indie rock
- Producer: A Silent Film

A Silent Film chronology
Sand & Snow (2012)	New Year (2015)

New Year is an EP by British alternative band A Silent Film, released on April 21, 2015.

== Track listing ==
No.	Title	Length
1.	"Paralysed"	3:37
2.	"Tomorrow"	3:17
3.	"Strong Enough"	4:36
4.	"Message in the Sand"	4:26

== Personnel ==
=== A Silent Film ===
- Robert Stevenson – piano, vocals
- Karl Bareham – guitar
- Ali Hussain – bass
- Spencer Walker – drums
