= January 1 (disambiguation) =

January 1 is the first day of the year in the Gregorian calendar which is celebrated as New Year's Day.

It can also refer to:

- January 1 (Eastern Orthodox liturgics)
- January 1 (film), a 1984 Indian Tamil-language film
- "January 1st" (song), a 2019 song by the Japanese rock band Coldrain

== See also ==
- New Year's Day (disambiguation)
