= New Year's Day (disambiguation) =

New Year's Day is observed on January 1, the first day of the year on the modern Gregorian calendar as well as the Julian calendar.

New Year's Day may also refer to:

== Film and television ==
- New Year's Day (1989 film), an American comedy-drama by Henry Jaglom
- New Year's Day (2001 film), a British comedy-drama by Suri Krishnamma
- "New Year's Day" (Fear Itself), a 2008 television episode

== Music ==
- New Years Day (band), an American rock band; also, a 2006 eponymous EP
- "New Year's Day" (Taylor Swift song), 2017
- "New Year's Day" (U2 song), 1983
- "New Year's Day", a song by Bon Jovi from This House Is Not for Sale, 2016
- "New Year's Day", a song by Robbie Williams from The Christmas Present, 2019

== Other uses ==
- New Year's Day (horse) (foaled 2011), an American Thoroughbred racehorse

== See also ==
- January 1 (disambiguation)
- Lunar New Year, the first day of a year whose months are moon cycles
- Odunde Festival, a one-day festival derived from the traditional new-year celebration of the Yoruba people of Nigeria
- New Year (disambiguation)
- New Year's (disambiguation)
- New Year's Eve (disambiguation)
