= New Year Island =

New Year Island may refer to:

- Año Nuevo Island, California
- Islas Año Nuevo, Argentina
- Isla de Año Nuevo, name variant of Isla Observatorio, Argentina
- New Year Island (Northern Territory)
- New Year Island (Western Australia)
- New Year Island (New Zealand)
- New Years Island, New York
- New Year Island (Tasmania)
- Mejit Island, Marshall Islands, called Neujahrsinsel by the German navigator Otto von Kotzebue in 1817
