= List of The Complete Guide to Everything episodes =

The podcast The Complete Guide to Everything (TCGTE) released its first episode on 2 July 2009. The show is hosted by Tom Reynolds and Tim Daniels, and releases episodes weekly on Sundays.

== Episode list ==
No.	Title	Release date
905	"Grand Theft Auto VI"	November 15, 2026
904	"Protein"	November 8, 2026
903	"Cryptids"	November 1, 2026
902	"Psychics"	October 25, 2026
901	"Shingles"	October 18, 2026
900	"Halloween Candy"	October 11, 2026
899	"Halloween Decorations"	October 4, 2026
898	"Rank Cranks - Candy [Unlocked]"	September 28, 2026
897	"Waiting Rooms"	September 20, 2026
896	"Folding Phones"	September 13, 2026
895	"Dolly Parton"	September 6, 2026
894	"Surfing"	August 30, 2026
893	"Sharks"	August 24, 2026
892	"Summer Jobs - Part 2"	August 16, 2026
891	"Summer Jobs"	August 9, 2026
890	"Air Conditioning"	August 2, 2026
889	"Thunderstorms"	July 26, 2026
888	"Sunglasses"	July 20, 2026
887	"Songs of the Summer 2026"	July 12, 2026
886	"Ice Cream"	July 5, 2026
885	"Summer Movies 2026 - Part 3"	June 28, 2026
884	"Summer Movies 2026 - Part 2"	June 21, 2026
883	"Summer Movies 2026 - Part 1"	June 14, 2026
882	"Cathy"	June 7, 2026
881	"Nielsen Ratings"	May 31, 2026
880	"Jell-o"	May 24, 2026
879	"Greatest Living American Songwriters"	May 17, 2026
878	"Eurovision"	May 10, 2026
877	"Magicians"	May 3, 2026
876	"Aging"	April 26, 2026
875	"Caverns"	April 20, 2026
874	"Artemis II"	April 12, 2026
873	"Pranks"	April 5, 2026
872	"Ryan Gosling"	March 29, 2026
871	"Medieval Times"	March 22, 2026
870	"Looksmaxxing"	March 15, 2026
869	"Trios"	March 8, 2026
868	"Dating Etiquette"	March 1, 2026
867	"Waiting in Line"	February 22, 2026
866	"Pigeons"	February 15, 2026
865	"Umbrellas"	February 9, 2026
864	"90s Daytime Talk Shows - Part Deux"	February 2, 2026
863	"90s Daytime Talk Shows"	January 25, 2026
862	"Supermarkets"	January 18, 2026
861	"CES 2026"	January 11, 2026
860	"Biohacking"	January 4, 2026
859	"2025 Year-in-Review"	28 December 2025
858	"Christmas Cards"	21 December 2025
857	"Holiday Toys 2025"	14 December 2025
856	"Secret Santa"	7 December 2025
855	"Eyeglasses"	30 November 2025
854	"Macy's Thanksgiving Parade"	23 November 2025
853	"Daylight Saving Time"	16 November 2025
852	"Jury Duty (Tim's Version)"	9 November 2025
851	"Spiders"	2 November 2025
850	"Sleep Paralysis"	26 October 2025
849	"Aleister Crowley"	19 October 2025
848	"Curses"	12 October 2025
847	"The Boogeyman"	5 October 2025
846	"Hobbies - Part 2"	28 September 2025
845	"Hobbies - Part 1"	21 September 2025
844	"Snoring"	14 September 2025
843	"Physical Media"	7 September 2025
842	"Pizza Hut"	31 August 2025
841	"Keys"	24 August 2025
840	"Summer Camp"	17 August 2025
839	"Toast"	10 August 2025
838	"Ears"	2 August 2025
837	"Ozzy Osbourne"	27 July 2025
836	"Urgent Care"	21 July 2025
835	"Superman"	13 July 2025
834	"Jeff Bezos"	6 July 2025
833	"Dolly Parton [Pop Everything]"	29 June 2025
832	"Catching The Big Fish"	22 June 2025
831	"Brian Wilson"	15 June 2025
830	"JFK Assassination"	8 June 2025
829	"Self-Checkout"	1 June 2025
828	"Summer Movies 2025 – Pt. 2"	25 May 2025
827	"Summer Movies 2025 – Pt. 1"	19 May 2025
826	"Grunge"	11 May 2025
825	"Costco"	4 May 2025
824	"Popes"	27 April 2025
823	"4/20 (aka God's Herb)"	20 April 2025
822	"Phobias"	13 April 2025
821	"Nintendo Switch 2"	6 April 2025
820	"Men's Fashion"	30 March 2025
819	"Donuts"	23 March 2025
818	"Houseplants"	16 March 2025
817	"Dan Aykroyd"	9 March 2025
816	"Magic Shows"	2 March 2025
815	"Learning the Drums"	24 February 2025
814	"Baths"	16 February 2025
813	"Marriage Proposals"	10 February 2025
812	"Dead Internet Theory"	2 February 2025
811	"Dummies"	26 January 2025
810	"David Lynch"	19 January 2025
809	"Doomsday Bunkers"	13 January 2025
808	"Popeye"	5 January 2025
807	"2024 Year in Review"	30 December 2024
806	"Top Toys of 2024"	22 December 2024
805	"Rock and Roll Christmas Songs"	16 December 2024
804	"Snow Days"	8 December 2024
803	"Saint Nicolas"	1 December 2024
802	"Thanksgiving Sides"	24 November 2024
801	"Quincy Jones"	18 November 2024
800	"Desserts"	10 November 2024
799	"Dinosaurs"	3 November 2024
798	"Mummies"	27 October 2024
797	"Vampires"	20 October 2024
796	"Nightmares"	13 October 2024
795	"Skeletons"	6 October 2024
794	"Bachelor Parties"	29 September 2024
793	"Home Remedies"	22 September 2024
792	"Dave Grohl"	15 September 2024
791	"Michael Keaton"	8 September 2024
790	"Pasta"	1 September 2024
789	"7-Eleven"	25 August 2024
788	"Takeout Food"	18 August 2024
787	"Saturday Night Live"	11 August 2024
786	"2024 Olympics"	4 August 2024
785	"Deadpool"	28 July 2024
784	"Arena Concerts"	21 July 2024
783	"Tubi"	15 July 2024
782	"Eyes"	7 July 2024
781	"2009"	30 June 2024
780	"Songs of the Summer 2024"	23 June 2024
779	"Sports Mascots"	16 June 2024
778	"Wheel of Fortune"	9 June 2024
777	"Boating"	2 June 2024
776	"Pickles"	26 May 2024
775	"Jerry Seinfeld"	19 May 2024
774	"Dua Lipa"	12 May 2024
773	"Peanut Butter"	5 May 2024
772	"Gameboy"	28 April 2024
771	"Taylor Swift"	21 April 2024
770	"O.J. Simpson"	14 April 2024
769	"Eclipses"	7 April 2024
768	"Continental Breakfast"	31 March 2024
767	"Pepsi"	24 March 2024
766	"Toothpaste"	17 March 2024
765	"Wendy's Pt. 2"	10 March 2024
764	"Wendy's"	3 March 2024
763	"Leap Years"	25 February 2024
762	"Pancakes and Waffles"	19 February 2024
761	"Las Vegas Sphere"	12 February 2024
760	"The Yellow Wallpaper [Patreon Unlock]"	5 February 2024
759	"No Doubt"	29 January 2024
758	"Stanley Cup"	21 January 2024
757	"Consumer Electronics Show (CES) 2024"	14 January 2024
756	"Mickey Mouse"	7 January 2024
755	"2023 Year in Review"	31 December 2023
754	"Another Gauntlet"	24 December 2023
753	"Christmas Songs"	17 December 2023
752	"Top Toys of 2023"	10 December 2023
751	"Pop-Tarts"	3 December 2023
750	"The Gauntlet"	26 November 2023
749	"Black Friday"	19 November 2023
748	"Sesame Street"	12 November 2023
747	"Pumpkin Spice"	5 November 2023
746	"Shadow People"	30 October 2023
745	"Cursed Movies"	22 October 2023
744	"Witches"	15 October 2023
743	"Superstitions"	8 October 2023
742	"Fear"	1 October 2023
741	"Juice"	24 September 2023
740	"Young Adult Books"	17 September 2023
739	"Roblox"	10 September 2023
738	"Airbnb"	3 September 2023
737	"Tomatoes"	27 August 2023
736	"M&M's"	20 August 2023
735	"Boogie Boarding"	13 August 2023
734	"LK-99"	6 August 2023
733	"Mick Jagger"	30 July 2023
732	"Hollywood Strikes"	23 July 2023
731	"Grimace"	16 July 2023
730	"Light Beer"	9 July 2023
729	"We Didn't Start the Fire"	2 July 2023
728	"Last Day of School"	25 June 2023
727	"UFO Whistleblowers and Las Vegas Aliens"	18 June 2023
726	"Apple Vision Pro"	11 June 2023
725	"Summer Movies 2023 – Part 3"	4 June 2023
724	"Tim & Tom & Christine Solve Your Problems"	28 May 2023
723	"Summer Movies 2023 – Part 2"	22 May 2023
722	"Summer Movies 2023 – Part 1"	14 May 2023
721	"Zelda"	7 May 2023
720	"King Charles"	30 April 2023
719	"Vitamins"	23 April 2023
718	"Super Mario Bros. Part 2"	16 April 2023
717	"Super Mario Bros."	9 April 2023
716	"Easter Candy"	2 April 2023
715	"Springtime"	26 March 2023
714	"Banks"	19 March 2023
713	"Hollow Earth"	12 March 2023
712	"Dilbert"	5 March 2023
711	"Diet Coke"	26 February 2023
710	"Balloons"	19 February 2023
709	"Time Management and Planning"	12 February 2023
708	"Valentine’s Day"	5 February 2023
707	"New York City Scams"	29 January 2023
706	"ChatGPT"	22 January 2023
705	"Headaches"	15 January 2023
704	"The Old Pope"	8 January 2023
703	"Lego"	1 January 2023
702	"New Year’s Eve Parties"	25 December 2022
701	"Christmas Shopping"	18 December 2022
700	"Christmas Snacks"	11 December 2022
699	"Santa Claus"	4 December 2022
698	"Trader Joe's"	27 November 2022
697	"Pret A Manger"	20 November 2022
696	"Fast Food At Home"	13 November 2022
695	"Eggs"	6 November 2022
694	"Ghost Hunters"	30 October 2022
693	"The Roswell Incident"	23 October 2022
692	"The Grim Reaper"	16 October 2022
691	"The Munsters"	9 October 2022
690	"It's The Great Pumpkin, Charlie Brown"	2 October 2022
689	"Movie Snacks"	25 September 2022
688	"Bread"	18 September 2022
687	"Red Hot Chili Peppers"	11 September 2022
686	"Roller Skating"	4 September 2022
685	"Cocktails"	28 August 2022
684	"VHS"	21 August 2022
683	"Reading Books"	14 August 2022
682	"The Bermuda Triangle"	7 August 2022
681	"Infomercials"	31 July 2022
680	"Snack Mixes"	24 July 2022
679	"James Webb Space Telescope"	17 July 2022
678	"Thor"	10 July 2022
677	"Sovereign Citizens"	3 July 2022
676	"Tim & Tom Solve More of Your Problems By Overwhelming Popular Demand"	26 June 2022
675	"Tim & Tom Solve Your Problems So You Can Live a Life without Regrets"	19 June 2022
674	"The Ocean"	12 June 2022
673	"Vermont"	5 June 2022
672	"Turning 40 Too"	29 May 2022
671	"Beans"	22 May 2022
670	"The iPod"	15 May 2022
669	"The Brain"	8 May 2022
668	"Private Investigators"	1 May 2022
667	"The Potato Chip"	24 April 2022
666	"Target"	17 April 2022
665	"Being Trapped in an Elevator"	10 April 2022
664	"Blockbuster Video"	3 April 2022
663	"Satanic Panic (Episode 666)"	27 March 2022
662	"Coney Island"	20 March 2022
661	"Skydiving"	13 March 2022
660	"Batteries"	6 March 2022
659	"Cakes"	28 February 2022
658	"Gym Class"	20 February 2022
657	"Dating Apps"	13 February 2022
656	"Game Show Network"	7 February 2022
655	"Neil Young"	30 January 2022
654	"Bananas"	23 January 2022
653	"The Jinx"	17 January 2022
652	"Dry January"	9 January 2022
651	"New Year's Resolutions"	3 January 2022
650	"The 2021 Year-End Spectacular!"	26 December 2021
649	"Christmas Cocktails (aka Holiday Beverages That Contain Alcohol)"	19 December 2021
648	"The Grinch"	12 December 2021
647	"Autographs"	6 December 2021
646	"Archery"	29 November 2021
645	"Christine and Tom Solve Your Problems"	22 November 2021
644	"Adult Friendship"	15 November 2021
643	"Kelsey Grammer"	8 November 2021
240*	"Raising Children (2014 Repeat)"	31 October 2021
642	"Ouija Boards"	24 October 2021
641	"Demons"	17 October 2021
640	"The Zodiac Killer"	10 October 2021
639	"Monster Cereals"	3 October 2021
638	"MLMs"	26 September 2021
637	"Movie Soundtracks"	19 September 2021
636	"Nachos"	12 September 2021
635	"Best Buy"	5 September 2021
634	"Job Interviews"	29 August 2021
633	"The Metaverse"	22 August 2021
632	"Buses"	15 August 2021
631	"Pillows"	8 August 2021
630	"Ben Affleck"	1 August 2021
629	"Ketchup"	25 July 2021
628	"Civilian Space Travel"	18 July 2021
627	"Grilling"	11 July 2021
626	"Pentagon UAP Report"	4 July 2021
625	"Fast Food Breakfast"	27 June 2021
624	"TikTok"	20 June 2021
623	"Swimming"	20 June 2021
622	"Socks"	6 June 2021
621	"Paul McCartney (Died in 1966)"	30 May 2021
620	"Billionaires"	23 May 2021
619	"Rock and Roll Hall of Fame"	16 May 2021
618	"The Three Stooges"	9 May 2021
617	"Buffets"	2 May 2021
616	"Turning 40"	25 April 2021
615	"Arcade Games"	18 April 2021
614	"Man Caves"	11 April 2021
613	"Legal Weed"	4 April 2021
612	"Long Drives"	28 March 2021
611	"Water"	21 March 2021
610	"Spring"	14 March 2021
609	"NFTs (Non-Fungible Tokens)"	7 March 2021
608	"Missions To Mars"	28 February 2021
607	"Cheese"	21 February 2021
606	"Bars"	14 February 2021
605	"Blizzards"	7 February 2021
604	"GameStop"	31 January 2021
603	"WandaVision"	24 January 2021
602	"Tim and Tom Will Never Stop Solving Your Problems"	17 January 2021
601	"Jeopardy!"	10 January 2021
600	"Hot Beverages"	3 January 2021
599	"2021 Predictions"	27 December 2020
598	"Home Alone"	20 December 2020
597	"Cyberpunk 2077"	13 December 2020
596	"Top Toys of 2020"	6 December 2020
595	"Cyber Monday"	29 November 2020
594	"Pies"	22 November 2020
593	"PS5"	15 November 2020
592	"Tim and Tom Solve Your Problems In Uncertain Times"	8 November 2020
591	"Bones"	1 November 2020
590	"Hell"	25 October 2020
589	"Serial Killers"	18 October 2020
588	"Halloween Legends"	11 October 2020
587	"Halloween Songs"	4 October 2020
586	"Getting Gout"	27 September 2020
585	"Autumn"	20 September 2020
584	"The Park"	13 September 2020
583	"David Blaine – Ascension"	6 September 2020
582	"Drive-In Movies"	30 August 2020
581	"Walmart"	23 August 2020
580	"Hiking"	16 August 2020
579	"Alien Abduction"	9 August 2020
578	"Chipotle: Part 2"	2 August 2020
577	"Chipotle: Part 1"	26 July 2020
576	"5G"	19 July 2020
575	"Tim and Tom Can't Help But Solve Your Problems"	12 July 2020
574	"Showers"	5 July 2020
573	"Segway"	28 June 2020
572	"Air Fryers"	21 June 2020
571	"Waterbeds"	14 June 2020
570	"Cryotherapy (Live in Chicago)"	7 June 2020
569	"HBO Max"	31 May 2020
568	"The Prom"	24 May 2020
567	"Video Conferencing Etiquette"	17 May 2020
566	"80s Candy"	10 May 2020
565	"Cutting Your Own Hair"	3 May 2020
564	"Sleeping"	26 April 2020
563	"Moon Conspiracies"	19 April 2020
562	"Quibi"	12 April 2020
561	"Tim and Tom Solve Your Problems Despite Everything Else Going On"	5 April 2020
560	"Animal Crossing"	29 March 2020
559	"Self-Isolation"	22 March 2020
558	"Key West (Part Two)"	15 March 2020
557	"Key West (Part One)"	8 March 2020
556	"Morning Routines"	1 March 2020
555	"Milk"	23 February 2020
554	"Playground Games"	16 February 2020
553	"Date Night"	9 February 2020
552	"Brad Pitt"	2 February 2020
551	"McDonaldland"	26 January 2020
550	"Insomnia"	19 January 2020
549	"Cats (2019)"	12 January 2020
548	"The State of Star Wars"	5 January 2020
547	"New Year's Eve"	29 December 2019
546	"Cookies"	22 December 2019
545	"Hard to Find Holiday Toys"	15 December 2019
544	"The Best Movies of the 2010s"	8 December 2019
543	"Papa John"	1 December 2019
542	"Disney+"	24 November 2019
541	"Role Playing Games"	17 November 2019
540	"Coworking Spaces"	10 November 2019
539	"Paul Rudd"	3 November 2019
538	"Tim and Tom's True Tales of Terror"	27 October 2019
537	"Dr. Jekyll and Mr. Hyde"	20 October 2019
536	"The Legend of Sleepy Hollow"	13 October 2019
535	"Pumpkins"	6 October 2019
534	"Spas"	29 September 2019
533	"Murder (Live in London)"	22 September 2019
532	"Seltzer"	15 September 2019
531	"Packing"	8 September 2019
530	"Naps"	1 September 2019
529	"Generation X"	25 August 2019
528	"Frozen Treats"	18 August 2019
527	"Inbox Zero"	11 August 2019
526	"Babysitting"	4 August 2019
525	"Dips"	28 July 2019
524	"Hunks"	21 July 2019
523	"Tim and Tom Solve Your Problems For The Umpteenth Time"	14 July 2019
522	"Spider-Man"	7 July 2019
521	"Star Wars Galaxy's Edge"	30 June 2019
520	"Ballparks"	23 June 2019
519	"Iced Coffee"	16 June 2019
518	"Radiohead"	9 June 2019
517	"Elton John"	2 June 2019
516	"Outdoor Summertime Activities"	26 May 2019
515	"Keanu Reeves"	19 May 2019
514	"Coca-Cola"	12 May 2019
513	"Avengers: Endgame"	5 May 2019
512	"Game Boy"	28 April 2019
511	"Ridesharing"	21 April 2019
510	"Mayonnaise"	14 April 2019
509	"Karaoke"	7 April 2019
508	"Writing"	31 March 2019
507	"Smartphone Etiquette"	24 March 2019
506	"Scooters"	17 March 2019
505	"Captain Marvel"	10 March 2019
504	"CBD"	3 March 2019
503	"Dunkin' Donuts"	24 February 2019
502	"Libraries"	17 February 2019
501	"Meditation"	10 February 2019
500	"Keeping Warm"	3 February 2019
499	"The Sopranos"	27 January 2019
498	"Instant Pot"	20 January 2019
497	"Sully (Episode 500)"	13 January 2019
496	"Getting Organized"	6 January 2019
495	"2018 Year in Review"	30 December 2018
494	"Wrapping Gifts"	23 December 2018
493	"Christmas Movies"	16 December 2018
492	"Gift Giving Etiquette"	9 December 2018
491	"Dogs"	2 December 2018
490	"King Kong The Musical"	25 November 2018
489	"Stan Lee"	18 November 2018
488	"Las Vegas"	11 November 2018
487	"Red Dead Redemption 2"	4 November 2018
486	"Dracula"	28 October 2018
485	"Fright Fest"	21 October 2018
484	"Frankenstein"	14 October 2018
483	"Trick or Treating"	7 October 2018
482	"Delis"	30 September 2018
481	"Tipping"	23 September 2018
480	"The Predator"	16 September 2018
479	"Microwaves"	9 September 2018
478	"Netflix 2: More Netflix"	2 September 2018
477	"Netflix"	26 August 2018
476	"Salads"	19 August 2018
475	"Running"	12 August 2018
474	"Tom Cruise"	5 August 2018
473	"Bar Trivia (Pub Quizzes)"	29 July 2018
472	"The Current Political Climate"	22 July 2018
471	"Security"	16 July 2018
470	"Heat Waves"	9 July 2018
469	"Fireworks"	2 July 2018
468	"Movie Theaters"	24 June 2018
467	"Casinos"	17 June 2018
466	"Jurassic Park"	10 June 2018
465	"Grifters"	3 June 2018
464	"Graduation"	28 May 2018
463	"Royal Wedding: Prince Hank Edition"	21 May 2018
462	"Life Problems"	14 May 2018
461	"Romantic Problems"	7 May 2018
460	"Lunch"	29 April 2018
459	"A Primer to Avengers: Infinity War"	22 April 2018
458	"Fortnite"	15 April 2018
457	"French Fries"	8 April 2018
456	"Steven Spielberg"	1 April 2018
455	"Toys R Us: RIP"	25 March 2018
454	"March Madness"	18 March 2018
453	"Hawaii"	11 March 2018
452	"Universal Studios"	4 March 2018
451	"Oscars 2018"	25 February 2018
450	"Hotels"	18 February 2018
449	"Romance"	11 February 2018
448	"Tea"	4 February 2018
447	"Cryptocurrency"	28 January 2018
446	"Driving Etiquette"	21 January 2018
445	"Fad Diets"	14 January 2018
444	"He-Man"	7 January 2018
443	"2018"	30 December 2017
442	"UFOs and The Pentagon: A Christmas Spectacular"	24 December 2017
441	"Snakes"	17 December 2017
440	"Holiday Gift Guide 2017"	10 December 2017
439	"Broadway"	3 December 2017
438	"Tim and Tom Solve Your Problems Whether You Want Them To or Not"	26 November 2017
437	"Justice League"	19 November 2017
436	"Tacos"	12 November 2017
435	"Super Mario"	5 November 2017
434	"Exorcisms"	29 October 2017
433	"Halloween Costumes"	22 October 2017
432	"Men in Black (Myths & Legends)"	15 October 2017
431	"Robbing A Bank"	7 October 2017
430	"Whole Foods"	2 October 2017
429	"Sunday Roast"	24 September 2017
428	"2017 Fall TV Preview"	17 September 2017
427	"Potato Chips"	9 September 2017
426	"Van Life (aka #vanlife)"	3 September 2017
425	"Saved By The Bell"	26 August 2017
424	"Sonic the Hedgehog"	19 August 2017
423	"The Sun"	13 August 2017
422	"Condiments"	6 August 2017
421	"Road Trips"	29 July 2017
420	"Christopher Nolan"	23 July 2017
419	"How To Disappear"	16 July 2017
418	"Teen Fads 2017"	9 July 2017
417	"iPhone 10th Anniversary"	2 July 2017
416	"Ron Howard"	25 June 2017
415	"Gardening"	18 June 2017
414	"Airports"	11 June 2017
413	"Personal Hygiene"	4 June 2017
412	"Wonder Woman"	28 May 2017
411	"Fake Meat"	21 May 2017
410	"Meat"	14 May 2017
409	"Laundry"	7 May 2017
408	"Toilets"	30 April 2017
407	"Board Games"	23 April 2017
406	"Tesla"	16 April 2017
405	"Fast Casual Dining"	9 April 2017
404	"Riverdale"	2 April 2017
403	"Yet Another Tim and Tom Solve Your Problems"	26 March 2017
402	"Scams with Dan Deacon (LIVE)"	19 March 2017
401	"Logan/Wolverine"	12 March 2017
400	"Hats"	5 March 2017
399	"Exoplanets"	26 February 2017
398	"Presidents"	19 February 2017
397	"Looney Tunes"	12 February 2017
396	"Snapchat"	5 February 2017
395	"Soup"	29 January 2017
394	"The Circus"	27 January 2017
393	"Food Network"	15 January 2017
392	"Becoming A Vegetarian"	8 January 2017
391	"Winter"	1 January 2017
390	"Being An Adult (LIVE!)"	25 December 2016
389	"Toys"	18 December 2016
388	"Going on Tour with Jeff Rosenstock"	11 December 2016
387	"Cowboys"	4 December 2016
386	"David Blaine"	27 November 2016
385	"Nintendo Entertainment System"	20 November 2016
384	"Tom Hanks"	13 November 2016
383	"Clowns"	6 November 2016
382	"Poltergeists"	30 October 2016
381	"Myths and Legends – Werewolves"	23 October 2016
380	"Yosemite"	17 October 2016
379	"Left Handedness"	9 October 2016
378	"Appetizers"	2 October 2016
377	"Fall TV Preview 2016 – Part 2"	25 September 2016
376	"Fall TV Preview 2016"	17 September 2016
375	"iPhone 7"	10 September 2016
374	"MTV VMA 2016"	3 September 2016
373	"Burger King"	26 August 2016
372	"Alien Superstructure"	19 August 2016
371	"Buffalo Wings"	12 August 2016
370	"Jared Leto"	5 August 2016
369	"Shoes"	30 July 2016
368	"Lucid Dreaming"	23 July 2016
367	"Pokémon Go"	16 July 2016
366	"Waterparks"	9 July 2016
365	"Fourth Of July"	2 July 2016
364	"Golf"	25 June 2016
363	"Sandwiches"	18 June 2016
362	"Simulation Hypothesis"	11 June 2016
361	"Summer Vacation"	4 June 2016
360	"Sweden"	28 May 2016
359	"Reboots"	21 May 2016
358	"Acupuncture"	14 May 2016
357	"2016 Summer Movies Part 2"	7 May 2016
356	"Tim And Tom Solve Even More of Your Problems Again"	29 April 2016
355	"Prince"	23 April 2016
354	"Oculus Rift"	16 April 2016
353	"Tiny Houses"	9 April 2016
352	"The Internet Of Things"	2 April 2016
351	"2016 Summer Movies Part 1"	26 March 2016
350	"Spring Break"	19 March 2016
349	"Civilian Space Travel"	12 March 2016
348	"Popcorn"	6 March 2016
347	"The Chupacabra"	27 February 2016
346	"Bagels"	21 February 2016
345	"Childhood Ambitions"	12 February 2016
344	"Groceries"	6 February 2016
343	"Rebranding"	30 January 2016
342	"Snow"	23 January 2016
341	"Glasses"	17 January 2016
340	"Sensory Deprivation"	9 January 2016
339	"Ska With Dan Deacon"	2 January 2016
338	"Chocolate"	26 December 2015
337	"T&TSYP"	19 December 2015
336	"US Mail"	12 December 2015
335	"Stand-Up Comedy"	5 December 2015
334	"RPGs"	28 November 2015
333	"Public Relations"	22 November 2015
332	"Pizza"	15 November 2015
331	"The Moon"	7 November 2015
330	"Hoverboards"	31 October 2015
329	"Halloween Candy"	23 October 2015
328	"Back to the Future"	16 October 2015
327	"NYC Comic Con 2015"	9 October 2015
326	"Pretty Woman"	3 October 2015
325	"Podcasts"	25 September 2015
324	"Burning Man"	19 September 2015
323	"Apple TV"	11 September 2015
322	"TV Show Tapings"	5 September 2015
321	"McWhopper"	28 August 2015
320	"Bad Luck"	21 August 2015
319	"Berenstain Bears And The Mandela Effect"	13 August 2015
318	"City Etiquette"	8 August 2015
317	"Celebrity Encounters"	31 July 2015
316	"Foo Fighters"	24 July 2015
315	"Taco Bell"	15 July 2015
314	"Fallen Heroes"	10 July 2015
313	"Apple Music"	3 July 2015
312	"Mobile Games"	28 June 2015
311	"Fan Theories"	20 June 2015
310	"Escaping From Prison"	13 June 2015
309	"Tim And Tom Solve Your Problems Yet Again"	6 June 2015
308	"Treating Yourself"	29 May 2015
307	"2015 Summer Movies"	21 May 2015
306	"Mattresses (Part One Of The Bed Series)"	16 May 2015
305	"California"	7 May 2015
304	"HGTV"	1 May 2015
303	"Birthdays"	24 April 2015
302	"Bruce Willis"	18 April 2015
301	"Area 51"	11 April 2015
300	"Cars Of The Future!"	3 April 2015
299	"Starbucks"	27 March 2015
298	"Buying A Car"	20 March 2015
297	"Minecraft"	13 March 2015
296	"Harrison Ford"	8 March 2015
295	"Sneakers"	28 February 2015
294	"Toy Fair"	21 February 2015
293	"Kanye West"	13 February 2015
292	"Vaccines"	7 February 2015
291	"Microsoft"	31 January 2015
290	"Basketball"	25 January 2015
289	"Joining A Gym"	16 January 2015
288	"Cereal"	10 January 2015
287	"Secret Menu Items"	2 January 2015
286	"2014 Year In Review"	27 December 2014
285	"Stephen King"	19 December 2014
284	"Mars"	13 December 2014
283	"Christmas Trees"	5 December 2014
282	"Soda"	29 November 2014
281	"Uber"	22 November 2014
280	"Toys "R" Us"	14 November 2014
279	"Florida"	8 November 2014
278	"Taylor Swift"	30 October 2014
277	"Halloween Parties"	26 October 2014
276	"NY Comic Con"	19 October 2014
275	"Arcades"	12 October 2014
274	"NYC Subway Vs London Tube"	5 October 2014
273	"Derek Jeter"	27 September 2014
272	"Comic Book TV Shows (Fall 2014)"	21 September 2014
271	"Apple Watch"	14 September 2014
270	"NYC Trendy Food"	7 September 2014
269	"Memes"	30 August 2014
268	"Emergency Preparedness"	23 August 2014
267	"Ice Cream"	16 August 2014
266	"Teenage Mutant Ninja Turtles"	10 August 2014
265	"Personal Hygiene"	2 August 2014
264	"Summer Concert Series"	27 July 2014
263	"Fitness Trackers"	20 July 2014
262	"Haunted Houses"	13 July 2014
261	"Charles Manson"	5 July 2014
260	"Horse Racing"	28 June 2014
259	"World Cup 2014 Brazil"	22 June 2014
258	"Going Off The Grid"	7 June 2014
257	"Soylent"	31 May 2014
256	"Conspiracy Theories (Night 2 in Manchester 2013"	24 May 2014
255	"Twitter"	18 May 2014
254	"Summer Movie Preview 2014 – Part 2"	11 May 2014
253	"Summer Movie Preview 2014"	4 May 2014
252	"Mac And Cheese"	26 April 2014
251	"Billy Joel"	20 April 2014
250	"Novelty Items"	12 April 2014
249	"Elementary School With Dan Deacon"	6 April 2014
248	"Virtual Reality"	30 March 2014
247	"Guitar Center"	23 March 2014
246	"Nuclear Power"	15 March 2014
245	"Hot Dogs"	9 March 2014
244	"Bitcoins"	2 March 2014
243	"The Oscars 2014"	24 February 2014
242	"Cable TV"	17 February 2014
241	"Traveling Into The Future With Anna Kendrick"	10 February 2014
240	"Super Bowl Commercials"	2 February 2014
239	"Raising Children"	27 January 2014
238	"Fancy Suits"	19 January 2014
237	"Nancy Kerrigan & Tonya Harding Scandal"	13 January 2014
236	"Hangover Cures"	6 January 2014
235	"2013 Year In Review"	30 December 2013
234	"Christmas Shopping"	23 December 2013
233	"Home Alone 2"	16 December 2013
232	"Drones"	9 December 2013
231	"Open Letters"	2 December 2013
230	"Thanksgiving"	25 November 2013
229	"Personal Finance"	18 November 2013
228	"Coffee Shop Etiquette"	11 November 2013
227	"Writing A Novel"	4 November 2013
226	"Jury Duty"	26 October 2013
225	"Home Invasion"	20 October 2013
224	"Electronic Dance Music"	12 October 2013
223	"Modern Art"	6 October 2013
222	"Claire Danes"	28 September 2013
221	"GTA V"	22 September 2013
220	"Veterinarians"	14 September 2013
219	"Fall TV Preview 2013"	7 September 2013
218	"French Fry Burgers and Secret Ingredients"	31 August 2013
217	"Magicians"	25 August 2013
216	"Another Episode About Video Games"	18 August 2013
215	"Trains"	11 August 2013
214	"Tim and Tom Solve Even More of Your Problems"	4 August 2013
213	"Batman Vs. Superman The Movie"	27 July 2013
212	"Being Lazy"	21 July 2013
211	"Amazing Facts!"	14 July 2013
210	"The Beach"	7 July 2013
209	"Board Games"	30 June 2013
208	"Dog Fostering"	22 June 2013
207	"Superman"	16 June 2013
206	"Conspiracy Theories (Reptilians, JFK and Dinosaurs) – Live in Manchester on 18 March 2013"	8 June 2013
205	"NYC Tourism (Part 1) (Recording of live YouTube broadcast 30 May 2013)"	1 June 2013
204	"Binge Watching"	25 May 2013
203	"The Complete Guide to Nothing In Particular: The Squeakquel"	19 May 2013
202	"Biking"	12 May 2013
201	"Fancy Restaurants"	5 May 2013
200	"Summer Movies 2013"	21 April 2013
199	"The Complete Guide to The Complete Guide to Everything"	14 April 2013
198	"Wrestling"	8 April 2013
197	"Easter"	31 March 2013
196	"Urban Legends: Disney Theme Parks"	24 March 2013
195	"Subway Etiquette"	17 March 2013
194	"Supermarket Shopping"	10 March 2013
193	"Martial Arts"	3 March 2013
192	"Tim & Tom Solve Your Friend-Making, Friend-Ending and DVD Lending Problems"	24 February 2013
191	"Meteors"	17 February 2013
190	"McDonald's Part 2: The Return of the Arch Deluxe"	10 February 2013
189	"McDonald's"	4 February 2013
188	"Super Bowl 2013"	27 January 2013
187	"CES Wrapup 2013"	20 January 2013
186	"The Flu"	13 January 2013
185	"College Urban Legends"	6 January 2013
184	"The Movies of 2012"	30 December 2012
183	"2012 – The Year in Entertainment"	23 December 2012
182	"Richard Marx"	16 December 2012
181	"Christmas Specials Christmas Special (Part Two: More Christmas Specials)"	9 December 2012
180	"Christmas Specials Christmas Special (Part One: Christmas Specials)"	2 December 2012
179	"Moving (Part 2)"	25 November 2012
178	"Moving (Part 1)"	19 November 2012
177	"Star Wars"	11 November 2012
176	"Hurricane Sandy Aftermath"	5 November 2012
175	"Frankenstorm (YouTube Live Edition)"	29 October 2012
174	"Extreme Stunts"	21 October 2012
173	"The 2012 Presidential Election"	14 October 2012
172	"Chicago"	7 October 2012
171	"Concerts"	30 September 2012
170	"The Future of Technology (iPhone 5, MakerBot and Google Glasses)"	24 September 2012
169	"Dating Part 4 – Wooing"	18 September 2012
168	"Richard Dawson and Glasses"	9 September 2012
167	"Doctor Who"	2 September 2012
166	"Celebrity Gossip Roundup"	27 August 2012
165	"Fears: Elevators"	20 August 2012
164	"Internships"	12 August 2012
163	"Vampires"	5 August 2012
162	"The 2012 Olympics"	29 July 2012
161	"The New York Times' Williamsburg"	22 July 2012
160	"The Dark Knight Rises"	15 July 2012
159	"Los Angeles"	8 July 2012
158	"Summer Music"	1 July 2012
157	"Tim and Tom and Dave Solve Your Problems"	24 June 2012
156	"Summer Movies 2012: Part 2"	17 June 2012
155	"Summer Movies"	10 June 2012
154	"Stunts"	3 June 2012
153	"Tim's Birthday Celebration"	28 May 2012
152	"The Great Googa Mooga"	21 May 2012
151	"Creeps"	13 May 2012
150	"Live in London: Time Travel"	6 May 2012
149	"The Avengers"	29 April 2012
148	"Ghosts"	22 April 2012
147	"British Television"	15 April 2012
146	"Friends"	8 April 2012
145	"Mega Millions"	1 April 2012
144	"The Hunger Games"	25 March 2012
143	"SXSW"	18 March 2012
142	"Tim and Tom Solve Your Problems"	12 March 2012
141	"Beer"	4 March 2012
140	"The Oscars 2012"	26 February 2012
139	"Abe Lincoln"	19 February 2012
138	"Valentine's Day"	12 February 2012
137	"Stuffed Crust Pizza and Two Sad Men"	5 February 2012
136	"Groundhog Day"	29 January 2012
135	"Facebook"	22 January 2012
134	"Underwear"	15 January 2012
133	"Medicine"	8 January 2012
132	"New Year's Resolutions"	2 January 2012
131	"Kim Jong Il"	25 December 2011
130	"Christmas Songs"	18 December 2011
129	"Santa Claus"	11 December 2011
128	"The SkyMall Holiday Gift Guide"	4 December 2011
127	"The Muppets"	27 November 2011
126	"Cranksgiving & Sleep No More"	20 November 2011
125	"Zooey Deschanel"	13 November 2011
124	"Marathons"	6 November 2011
123	"Listener Mail"	30 October 2011
122	"Halloween Spooktacular 2011"	23 October 2011
121	"Zombies"	16 October 2011
120	"Steve Jobs"	11 October 2011
119	"Hamburgers"	2 October 2011
118	"Ancient Aliens"	25 September 2011
117	"Jeopardy"	19 September 2011
116	"Back to School"	11 September 2011
115	"Weddings"	4 September 2011
114	"Hurricanes"	28 August 2011
113	"The Kardashians"	21 August 2011
112	"Last Minute Vacations"	14 August 2011
111	"Museums"	8 August 2011
110	"New York Yankees"	31 July 2011
109	"Beating the Heat"	24 July 2011
108	"Planking"	17 July 2011
107	"Swimming Pools"	11 July 2011
106	"Cults"	3 July 2011
105	"Summertime Part 1"	27 June 2011
104	"Canadian Travel"	19 June 2011
103	"Father's Day"	12 June 2011
102	"Zooey and the Berge"	6 June 2011
101	"BBQs"	29 May 2011
100	"The Rapture"	22 May 2011
99	"International Travel"	16 May 2011
98	"Bigfoot"	8 May 2011
97	"The Royal Wedding"	1 May 2011
96	"Breaking Up"	25 April 2011
95	"Dating: The Art of Seduction"	17 April 2011
94	"Loch Ness Monster"	10 April 2011
93	"Candy"	3 April 2011
92	"Kitchen Nightmares"	27 March 2011
91	"HaircutCast Part 2"	20 March 2011
90	"iPad 2"	13 March 2011
89	"Daytime TV"	7 March 2011
88	"1990s Rock"	27 February 2011
87	"Gambling"	20 February 2011
86	"News Roundup – February 2011"	13 February 2011
85	"Valentine's Day"	6 February 2011
84	"The Super Bowl"	30 January 2011
83	"Game Shows (Present Day)"	23 January 2011
82	"News Roundup – January 2011"	16 January 2011
81	"Disney"	9 January 2011
80	"2010 In Review and 2011 Predictions"	2 January 2011
79	"Video Games: The Lost Version (8 minute episode via tcgte.com and YouTube only)"	30 December 2010
78	"Video Games"	26 December 2010
77	"Coffee"	19 December 2010
76	"Holiday Movies"	12 December 2010
75	"The Mall"	5 December 2010
74	"Airport Security"	28 November 2010
73	"Harry Potter"	21 November 2010
72	"Dating (Part 2)"	14 November 2010
71	"Dating (Part 1)"	7 November 2010
70	"Video Stores"	31 October 2010
69	"Breakfast"	24 October 2010
68	"Public Services (Or An Excuse to Talk About Poop)"	17 October 2010
67	"Department of Motor Vehicles"	11 October 2010
66	"The Internet"	3 October 2010
65	"Celebrity"	26 September 2010
64	"Shopping"	19 September 2010
63	"IKEA"	12 September 2010
62	"Sleuthing"	6 September 2010
61	"Facial Hair"	29 August 2010
60	"Juggalo Culture"	22 August 2010
59	"Healthy Eating"	15 August 2010
58	"Disney World"	8 August 2010
57	"Air Travel"	1 August 2010
56	"The UK with Dave Hill"	25 July 2010
55	"UFOs and Aliens"	18 July 2010
54	"Being a Man"	11 July 2010
53	"An Unfortunate Encounter and More Michael Jackson"	4 July 2010
52	"Summer"	27 June 2010
51	"World Cup"	20 June 2010
50	"Winning the Lottery"	13 June 2010
49	"News Roundup"	6 June 2010
48	"Marketing to Kids and Ripping Out Hearts"	30 May 2010
47	"Lost – The End (TCGTE.com Exclusive)"	24 May 2010
46	"Camping"	23 May 2010
45	"The Hobo Code"	16 May 2010
44	"Tom Hanks Is My Bartender"	9 May 2010
43	"Facebook, Death and Fast Food"	2 May 2010
42	"Girl Problems"	25 April 2010
41	"Bars"	18 April 2010
40	"Nothing in Particular"	11 April 2010
39	"Teen Idols (Biebermania Edition)"	4 April 2010
38	"Chat Roulette"	28 March 2010
37	"St. Patrick’s Day (HaircutCast Edition)"	21 March 2010
36	"Tom’s Big Week or "The Monday Morning Grindcast""	14 March 2010
35	"The Bachelor"	7 March 2010
34	"Cruises"	28 February 2010
33	"Mass Transit (First Outside Broadcast Episode)"	21 February 2010
32	"Winter Olympics (Super Late Update)"	18 February 2010
31	"The Grammy Awards"	7 February 2010
30	"Lost"	31 January 2010
29	"Diets"	24 January 2010
28	"Fast Food"	17 January 2010
27	"Being Sick"	10 January 2010
26	"2010 or Twenty-Ben: The Year of the Milkternet"	3 January 2010
25	"Christmas or How Cute Are These Boots?"	20 December 2009
24	"1990s Sitcoms: TGIF Edition"	13 December 2009
23	"Hodge Podge"	6 December 2009
22	"The Best of Everything"	22 November 2009
21	"Arnold Schwarzenegger"	15 November 2009
20	"College: Sophomore Year"	7 November 2009
19	"Baseball"	1 November 2009
18	"Halloween"	25 October 2009
17	"Hip Hop"	18 October 2009
16	"Bathroom Etiquette"	11 October 2009
15	"Colon Health and Final Destination"	4 October 2009
14	"Drunk Presidents and Nicolas Cage"	27 September 2009
13	"Twilight"	20 September 2009
12	"Fall TV"	14 September 2009
11	"The Beatles"	7 September 2009
10	"Superheroes or: Why Isn’t There a Real Batman?"	2 September 2009
9	"New York City and Yuppies vs. Ice Cream"	24 August 2009
8	"College – Freshman Year and Wearing T-Shirts As Underwear"	17 August 2009
7	"North Korea and Winning Porn Bingo"	9 August 2009
6	"Letters to Famous Prisoners"	2 August 2009
5	"Listener Suggestions"	27 July 2009
4	"Weird Al"	23 July 2009
3	"Police Academy and Bums vs. Hobos (Removed from iTunes due to poor audio quality)"	16 July 2009
2	"Time Travel"	9 July 2009
1	"Michael Jackson"	2 July 2009

Pre-audio, video podcasts:

Episode
- Hamburgers
- Magic
- Amusement Parks

== Live shows ==
The first-ever live versions of the show, hosted by Reynolds and Daniels, took place in London, England on 7–8 May 2011, and were held at the Hen and Chickens Theatre and Kings Place respectively. Tickets for the event sold out. A short 5-minute video of the first live show was released in lieu of the full recording of the show, which was lost during 'the London Incident' (see below).

Venue
- Hen & Chickens Theatre, London
- Kings Place, London
- PIT, New York
- PIT, New York
- Kings Arms, Salford, Manchester
- Kings Place, London
- The North Door, Austin (SXSW Headgum Showcase)
- Tack Room, Chicago
- Kings Place, London
Date
- 7 May 2011
- 8 May 2011
- 4 August 2011
- 30 December 2011
- 10 April 2012
- 11 & 12 April 2012
- 11 March 2017
- 16 June 2019
- 16 & 17 September 2022

Additionally, the show has done one live aftershow following the 1990s Sitcoms: TGIF edition that appeared on UStream.tv. The aftershow took place at a bar and was released on the UStream.tv iPhone application.

== After Dark Episode List ==
For a short period of time, The Complete Guide to Everything had a premium subscription service in which listeners would pay a monthly fee to hear an extra podcast throughout the month. The "After Dark" episodes included interviews of people that the hosts knew. Eventually, Reynolds and Daniels decided to discontinue to the premium subscription, and all episodes became available to purchase at TCGTE online store.

Episode
- 9: Scamcast with Paul McKenna
- 8: Roundtable with Erin Leigh
- 7: Vegetarianism with Brendan Jordan
- 6: Casinos with Christine
- 5: Andrew Gregory v. Forrest Gump
- 4: Jeff's Guide to Being Punk Rock
- 3: Amy and the Unfortunately Wine Stains
- 2: Nick and the Great Switcharoo
- 1: Algernon, or Where Did All Those Birds Come From
Featuring
- Paul McKenna, 24Cast, Victim of Various Scams
- Erin Leigh Schmoyer, Actor / Improviser, ComedySportzNYC, HotDish
- Brendan Jordan, Actor / Improviser, Magnet Theater
- Christine Femia, HotDish
- Andrew Gregory, Singer-Songwriter / Comedian The Gregory Brothers
- Jeff Rosenstock, musician, The Arrogant Sons of Bitches, Bomb the Music Industry
- Amy Fierro, Bright Beige Design
- Nick Carbonaro, filmmaker
- Algernon Quashie, musical, Miniature Tigers
