= Another Time (Andrew's Song) =

Single by Annaleigh Ashford
- Released: January 14, 2014
- Recorded: 2014; Harlem Parlour Recording, NYC
- Genre: Easy Listening
- Length: 4:00
- Label: Will Van Dyke
- Songwriter(s): Will Van Dyke

"Another Time (Andrew's Song)" is a song by American singer Annaleigh Ashford and her close friend and music artist, Will Van Dyke. The song was written by Van Dyke and produced by Derik Lee. It was released on iTunes and Van Dyke's website on January 14, 2014. It was written for Van Dyke's fiancé, casting associate Andrew Femenella, and is featured in Ashford's cabaret show, "Lost in the Stars" . "Another Time (Andrew's Song)" is an Easy Listening track. In addition to writing music and lyrics, Van Dyke is featured on piano on the single. The track also features Michael Aarons (guitar), Steve Gilewski (bass), Sammy Merendino (drums), Philip Payton (violin/viola), and Allison Seidner (cello). It was recorded at Harlem Parlour Recording, NYC by Derik Lee, who also mixed and mastered the recording.
