= Broadway Records (2012) =

American record label founded in 2012

- Founded: 2012
- Founder: Van Dean
- Genre: Musical theatre
- Country of origin: United States
- Official website: www.broadwayrecords.com

Broadway Records is a Grammy-winning record label specializing in releasing Broadway and off-Broadway cast recordings, as well as preserving legacy musical theatre and theatre vocalists repertoire. The president and founder is Van Dean.

The label's critically acclaimed "Live at Feinstein's/54 Below" series features Broadway stars including Patti LuPone, Aaron Tveit, Annaleigh Ashford, Norbert Leo Butz, Sierra Boggess, Laura Benanti, Emily Skinner, Alice Ripley, Adam Pascal, Anthony Rapp, Micky Dolenz and many others.

Broadway Records has partnered with the Black Theatre Coalition to create Black Writers Amplified, an album consisting entirely of new works by Black musical theatre writers, a project to immediately take steps toward significantly increased representation of Black writers in musical theatre. Black Writers Amplified will be released in 2021 and act as a resource for artistic directors, producers and other theatre creators to find and support new voices and emerging Black talent.

Broadway Records has a streaming radio service on Dash Radio.

Broadway Records philanthropic endeavors include the "Broadway For Orlando: What The World Needs Now is Love", "We Are The World" by Broadway United and "Broadway Kids Against Bullying: I Have a Voice" music videos, and From Broadway With Love benefit concerts for Sandy Hook, Orlando (Emmy Award for Sound), and Parkland.

== Releases ==
Below is a partial list of releases.

- Frankie! The Musical
- Live Your Life: Live at Feinstein's/54 Below, Nick Cordero's cabaret performance
- Shine (Instrument of Hope), a single written by Stoneman Douglas High School shooting survivors Sawyer Garrity and Andrea Peña
- Little Black Book, a musical based on the life of Heidi Fleiss
- 2019 Tony Award Season album
- NBC's television events, The Wiz Live! and Peter Pan Live!
- Willow, Over and Out, and Bittersummer with the Averno universe
- Secondhand Lions
- If The Fates Allow: The Hadestown Holiday Album
- Lea Salonga Live In Concert with the Sydney Symphony Orchestra
- Marguerite starring Cady Huffman
- Wellsongs Project
- Legacy: Two Song Cycles by Ahrens and Flaherty
- Georgia On My Mind, the soundstage recording of Estella Scrooge
- The Color Purple
- Once On This Island
- Matilda The Musical
- Fiddler on the Roof (2015 revival)
- My Fair Lady (2018 revival)
- Anastasia
- Bandstand
- Groundhog Day
- The Lightning Thief
