= A New Year =

Single by Annaleigh Ashford
- Released: December 2, 2016
- Recorded: 2016; New York City
- Genre: Easy Listening, Pop; Holiday
- Length: 5:01
- Label: Will Van Dyke
- Songwriters: Will Van Dyke, Jeff Talbott

"A New Year" is a song by American singer Annaleigh Ashford, with Will Van Dyke and Jeff Talbott. The song was written by Van Dyke and Talbott. It was released on iTunes and Van Dyke's website on December 2, 2016. "A New Year" is an Easy Listening track. In addition to writing music and lyrics, Van Dyke is featured on piano on the single. The track also features Alec Berlin (guitar), Steve Gilewski (bass), Mason Ingram (drums), and Allison Seidner (cello). The song was recorded in New York City and was mixed by Grammy Award Winner Derik Lee, and Ian Kagey. Oscar Zambrano mastered the recording.
