= The City That Sleeps =

Studio album by A Silent Film
- Released: October 2008 (UK), November 2010 (US)
- Genres: Indie rock, alternative rock
- Labels: Xtra Mile Recordings (UK), Bieler Bros. Records (US)
- Producer: Sam Williams

A Silent Film chronology
The City That Sleeps (2008)	Sand & Snow (2012)

The City That Sleeps is the debut studio album by alternative rock band A Silent Film. First released in the UK, it was followed up with a US version two years later containing two alternate tracks for American audiences.

== Release and reception ==
The City That Sleeps was received with mixed critical acclaim. The original UK version of the album, produced by Sam Williams, contains 11 tracks, including their single "You Will Leave a Mark." This single was number one in the Sunday Times Culture magazine's 'Hottest Downloads' chart. The album was compared to the music of bands such as Coldplay and reviewers described it as 'catchy and accessible.' It is this comparison that saddled the band with the piano rock label.

After the album's release the band toured, visiting places such as Portugal where they quickly became popular. After a matter of weeks, "You Will Leave A Mark" reached the top of the Portuguese download singles charts, followed by the album soon after.

In advance of the US release, the alternative rock music station Alt Nation on SiriusXM Satellite Radio began to play "You Will Leave A Mark" in April 2010. The song soon made it onto the station's Alt 18 Most Requested Song Countdown, debuting on the 5/1/2010 Countdown at #14. It would ultimately reach #1 and remain on the Countdown for 30 weeks, making it the longest running song to chart. This honor would be held until Foster the People's "Pumped Up Kicks" eventually surpassed it.

The band toured the US in September and December 2010, then performed almost daily from March 10 through April 8, 2011 in support of the album. The latter run was as support for Civil Twilight. In July, A Silent Film did a mini-tour of the West Coast. New material was presented at these shows which would ultimately wind up on the band's sophomore release, Sand & Snow. These included: "Cuckoo Song," "Harbour Lights," and "Let Them Feel Your Heartbeat." "Snowbirds" (later named "Where Snowbirds Have Flown") was also showcased, but would be a non LP b-side to the album's lead single, "Danny, Dakota and the Wishing Well," and would later appear on the deluxe edition of Sand & Snow.

== Track listing ==
=== UK release (2008) ===
1. Sleeping Pills
2. Julie June
3. Thirteen Times the Strength
4. One Wrong Door
5. Lamp Light
6. Gerontion
7. Feather White
8. You Will Leave a Mark
9. Highest Regard
10. Ghosts in the Water
11. Aurora

=== US re-release (2010) ===
1. Driven By Their Beating Hearts
2. Sleeping Pills
3. You Will Leave A Mark
4. Thirteen Times The Strength
5. Julie June
6. One Wrong Door
7. Firefly At My Window
8. Lamplight
9. Feather White
10. Aurora

== Personnel ==
=== A Silent Film ===
- Robert Stevenson
- Lewis Jones
- Ali Hussain
- Spencer Walker

=== Additional personnel ===
- Richard Haines - engineering
- Jamie Hyatt - engineering
- Tim Turan - mastering
- Sam Williams - engineering, mixing, producer
