= Happy New Year (disambiguation) =

"Happy New Year" is a holiday greeting.

Happy New Year may also refer to:

- New Year's Day, a holiday on 1 January which the greeting is said at the turn of the New Year

== Film and television ==
- Happy New Year (1973 film), a 1973 film directed by Claude Lelouch
- Happy New Year (1987 film), an American remake of the 1973 film, directed by John G. Avildsen
- Happy New Year (2008 film), a Swiss film
- Happy New Year (2014 film), an Indian Hindi-language action drama film by Farah Khan
- Happy New Year (2017 film), an Indian Kannada-language film
- I Love New Year, a 2015 Indian Hindi-language film with the working title Happy New Year
- A Year-End Medley, native name Happy New Year, a 2021 South Korean romance film
- "Happy New Year", an episode of The Wind in the Willows

== Music ==
- Happy New Year (album), a 2006 album by brooklyn based alternative rock/indie rock/Krautrock/psychedelic rock band Oneida
- Happy New Year (musical), a 1980 adaptation of the Philip Barry play Holiday
- Happy New Year (soundtrack), soundtrack for the 2014 film by Vishal–Shekhar
- Happy New Year (Violent Femmes EP)
- "Happy New Year" (song), a song by Swedish pop group ABBA on their 1980 album Super Trouper, also recorded by A*Teens
- "Happy New Year", a song by Dido from her 2013 album Girl Who Got Away
- "Happy New Year", a song by Let's Eat Grandma from their 2022 album Two Ribbons
- "Happy New Year!", an episode of season 4 of Phineas and Ferb
- "Happy New Year!", episodes of the Indian TV series Best of Luck Nikki (the Indian adaptation of Good Luck Charlie)
