= Sand & Snow =

Studio album by A Silent Film
- Released: June 5, 2012
- Genre: Alternative rock, indie rock
- Length: 45:21
- Label: Creative Media Investments (CMI)
- Producer: A Silent Film

A Silent Film chronology
The City That Sleeps (2011)	Sand & Snow (2012)

Sand & Snow is a studio album by British alternative band A Silent Film, released on June 5, 2012.

== Track listing ==
No.	Title	Length
1.	"Reaching the Potential"	3:51
2.	"This Stage Is Your Life"	3:51
3.	"Danny, Dakota & the Wishing Well"	4:46
4.	"Anastasia"	4:05
5.	"Cuckoo Song"	3:45
6.	"Let Them Feel Your Heartbeat"	3:15
7.	"Harbour Lights"	3:52
8.	"Rustle of the Stars"	4:02
9.	"Queen of a Sad Land"	4:36
10.	"Love Takes a Wrecking Ball"	3:54
11.	"Thousand Mile Race"	5:23

Deluxe Edition bonus tracks
No.	Title	Length
12.	"Dreamboat"	3:33
13.	"Echoes Across a Bowl of Tears"	4:26
14.	"Where Snowbirds Have Flown"	2:27

== Personnel ==
=== A Silent Film ===
- Robert Stevenson - piano, vocals
- Karl Bareham - guitar
- Ali Hussain - bass
- Spencer Walker - drums

=== Additional personnel ===
- Jessica Cox, Amy Stanford, Laura Stanford, and Rosie Tompsett - strings on "Reaching the Potential," "Danny, Dakota & the Wishing Well" and "Anastasia"
- John Catlin - engineering
- Charles Godfrey - engineering
- Darius Deezle Harrison - additional production
- Scott Knapper - engineering
- Catherine Marks - mixing
- Alan Moulder - mixing
- Felix Rashman - engineering
- Justin Salter - engineering
- Phil Schlemmer - engineering
