= George Salazar =

American actor (born 1986)

- Salazar in 2026
- Born: March 7, 1986 (age 40); Kissimmee, Florida, U.S.
- Education: University of Florida (BFA)
- Occupations: Actor; singer
- Years active: 2010–present
- Website: thegeorgesalazar.com

George Ernest Salazar (born March 7, 1986) is an American actor and singer. He is known for his work on and off-Broadway. He made his Broadway debut in the 2011 revival of Stephen Schwartz's Godspell. Salazar originated the role of Michael Mell in Be More Chill (2015) and performed the role Off-Broadway (2018) and Broadway (2019) at the Lyceum Theater in New York City. He originated the role of Grover in The Lightning Thief: The Percy Jackson Musical and starred in Pasadena Playhouse's production of Little Shop of Horrors as Seymour Krelborn. On screen, he had a recurring role as George Conway in the FX limited anthology series Impeachment: American Crime Story (2016), and in 2025 made his feature film acting debut as the voice and facial motion capture for Happy, one of the Seven Dwarfs in Disney's live-action remake of Snow White.

== Early life and education ==
Salazar was born on March 7, 1986, in Kissimmee, Florida, of Filipino and Ecuadorian heritage. Growing up, he wanted to be a surgeon, but switched his focus to the theater in his last two years of high school.

After graduating high school, he attended the University of Florida. In 2008, he graduated with a BFA degree in musical theatre. He moved to New York City shortly afterwards to pursue his acting career, as he felt that his career was limited in his home state owing to his ethnicity: "As an ethnic performer, I didn't fit in".

== Career ==
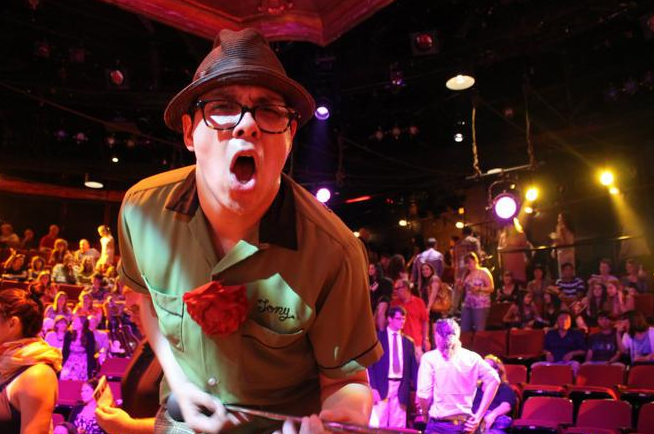
Salazar in the Broadway revival of Godspell

Salazar's first break came in 2010 when he was cast as "Otto" in the second national tour of the Tony Award-winning musical Spring Awakening. The production toured the United States as well as Canada and closed in May 2011. Upon returning to New York City from touring, Salazar earned his Actors' Equity Association membership.

In September 2011, Salazar was cast in the 40th Anniversary Broadway revival of Stephen Schwartz's Godspell. In the revival, he was the "Light of the World" soloist, marking his Broadway debut. The show opened at Broadway's Circle in the Square Theatre on November 7, 2011, and closed on June 24, 2012, after 30 previews and 264 performances. A cast album was recorded and released on Sh-K-Boom Records in 2012. During Godspell's run, he and the rest of the cast made television appearances on the Late Show with David Letterman, The View, The Rosie Show, and the Tony Awards telecast.

In the Spring of 2013, he further combined his passions for theatre and music as a cast member and musician in the Off-Broadway production of F#%king Up Everything. In addition to playing the stoner drummer of a rock band, he served as the musical's on-stage drummer. This role was later reprised in 2016 when the musical changed its name to Brooklyn Crush.

In the summer of 2013, Salazar became an understudy in The Public Theater's Off-Broadway production of David Byrne and Fatboy Slim's Here Lies Love, directed by Alex Timbers. In April 2014, Salazar rejoined the cast of Here Lies Love in an open-ended commercial run at the musical's original home, The Public Theater, as an onstage member of the ensemble. The production closed on January 4, 2015.

In 2015, he joined the cast of the musical adaptation of Ned Vizzini's Be More Chill as Michael Mell at the Two River Theater in Red Bank, New Jersey. The production closed on June 28, 2015.

In 2016, he played Michael in the Off-Broadway revival of Tick, Tick... Boom!, which opened on October 20, 2016, at the Acorn Theatre at Theater Row. The production ran from October 20 to December 18.

In 2017, Salazar played the characters of Grover and Mr. D in the Off-Broadway premiere of The Lightning Thief. The limited production ran from March 23 to May 6.

In 2018, he reprised his role as Michael Mell in Be More Chill in the Off-Broadway premiere of the musical at Signature Theatre Company from July to September 2018.

In 2019, Salazar played Michael Mell in Be More Chill at the Lyceum Theatre from February 14, 2019, to August 11, 2019, on Broadway.

In 2019, he starred in Little Shop of Horrors at Pasadena Playhouse as Seymour Krelborn from September 17, 2019, to October 20, 2019. During that time he was featured as a musical guest on The Late Late Show with James Corden on CBS where he sang "Suddenly Seymour" with Little Shop of Horrors co-star Mj Rodriguez.

In 2021, he played Musidorus in Head Over Heels at Pasadena Playhouse from November 9, 2021, to December 12, 2021. It is his first theatre acting role since the start of the COVID-19 pandemic, and the first show to reopen Pasadena Playhouse.

In 2022, Salazar played Agent Maxwell Fernsby in As the Curtain Rises, an original Broadway soap opera from the Broadway Podcast Network.

In 2023, he starred in the world premiere production of The Bottoming Process by Nicholas Pilapil, produced by IAMA Theatre Company at the Los Angeles LGBT Center from May 18 – June 12, 2023. Salazar portrayed the lead character Milo Santos opposite Rick Cosnett, after originating the role in the play's original workshop as a part of IAMA Theatre Company's Emerging Playwrights Lab. The Culver City News called his performance a "Tour-de-force."

From April 2026 through May 2027, Salazar is starring in the Broadway revival of The Rocky Horror Show as Eddie and Dr. Scott.

== Personal life ==
Salazar is an experienced percussionist on drumkit and cajón.

== Filmography ==
=== Film ===
Year	Title	Role	Notes
2025	Snow White	Happy	Voice and facial motion capture
TBA	These Little Ones Perish	Father Ramirez	

=== Television ===
Year	Title	Role	Notes
2016	Divorce	Referee	Episode: "Another Party"
2017	Bull	Foley	Episode: "What's Your Number?"
2019-2020	Superstore	Eric Sosa	Episodes: "Curbside Pickup", "Sandra's Wedding", "The Trough", "Deep Cleaning", "All Sales Final"
2020	Nancy Drew	Sal	Episodes: "The Lady of Larkspur Lane", "The Whisper Box"
2021	Impeachment: American Crime Story	George Conway	Episode: "The Telephone Hour"
2022	Alice's Wonderland Bakery	Dad Hatter	Episodes: Another Alice

== Theatre credits ==
Year	Production	Role	Venue	Level of Production
2010	Spring Awakening	Otto	Multiple venues	National tour
2011–12	Godspell	"Light of the World" soloist	Circle in the Square Theatre	Broadway
2013	F#%king Up Everything	Drummer	Elektra Theatre	Off-Broadway
2013	Here Lies Love	Male swing	The Public Theater	Off-Broadway
2014	Here Lies Love	Ensemble	The Public Theater	Off-Broadway
2015	Be More Chill	Michael Mell	Two River Theater	Regional
2016	Tick, Tick... Boom!	Michael	Acorn Theater at Theater Park	Off-Broadway
2017	The Lightning Thief	Grover/Mr. D	Lucille Lortel Theatre	Off-Broadway
2018	Be More Chill	Michael Mell	Signature Theatre Company	Off-Broadway
2019	Be More Chill	Michael Mell	Lyceum Theatre	Broadway
2019	Little Shop of Horrors	Seymour Krelborn	Pasadena Playhouse	Regional
2021	Head Over Heels	Musidorus	Pasadena Playhouse	Regional
2023	The Bottoming Process	Milo Santos	IAMA Theatre Company	Regional
2024	Glory Days	Skip	Symphony Space	Off-Broadway
2024	La Cage Aux Folles	Jacob	Pasadena Playhouse	Regional
2025	The Untitled Unauthorized Hunter S. Thompson Musical	Oscar Zeta Acosta	Signature Theatre, Arlington, VA	Regional
2026	The Rocky Horror Show	Eddie/Dr. Everett Scott	Studio 54	Broadway

== Awards and nominations ==
Year	Award ceremony	Category	Show	Result
2017	Drama Desk Award	Outstanding Featured Actor in a Musical	The Lightning Thief	Nominated
2019	Lucille Lortel Award	Outstanding Featured Actor in a Musical	Be More Chill	Won
2019	Outer Critics Circle Award	Outstanding Featured Actor in a Musical	Be More Chill	Nominated
2019	Drama Desk Award	Outstanding Featured Actor in a Musical	Be More Chill	Nominated
2019	Broadway.com Audience Choice Awards	Favorite Featured Actor in a Musical	Be More Chill	Won
2019	Broadway.com Audience Choice Awards	Favorite Onstage Pair (with Will Roland)	Be More Chill	Won
2019	BroadwayWorld Theatre Fans' Choice Awards	Best Featured Actor in a Musical	Be More Chill	Won

== Discography ==
Year	Album	Composer	Role	Label
2011	Godspell (The New Broadway Cast Recording)	Stephen Schwartz	"Light of the World" soloist	Sh-K-Boom Records
2014	Moment By Moment	Alexander Sage Oyen	N/A	Independent
2015	Be More Chill Original Cast Recording	Joe Iconis	Michael Mell	Sh-K-Boom Records
2016	Brooklyn Crush (Original Off-Broadway Cast Recording)	David Eric Davis and Sam Forman	The Drummer	Broadway Records
2017	The Lightning Thief (Original Cast Recording)	Rob Rokicki	Grover/Mr. D	Broadway Records
2018	Two-Player Game	Joe Iconis	—N/a	Sh-K-Boom Records
2019	Be More Chill (Original Broadway Cast Recording)	Joe Iconis	Michael Mell	Sh-K-Boom Records
2019	The Jonathan Larson Project	Jonathan Larson	—N/a	Ghostlight Records
2021	In Pieces: A New Musical (Highlights)	Joey Contreras	—N/a	Broadway Records
