= Charlie Rosen (musician) =

American musician

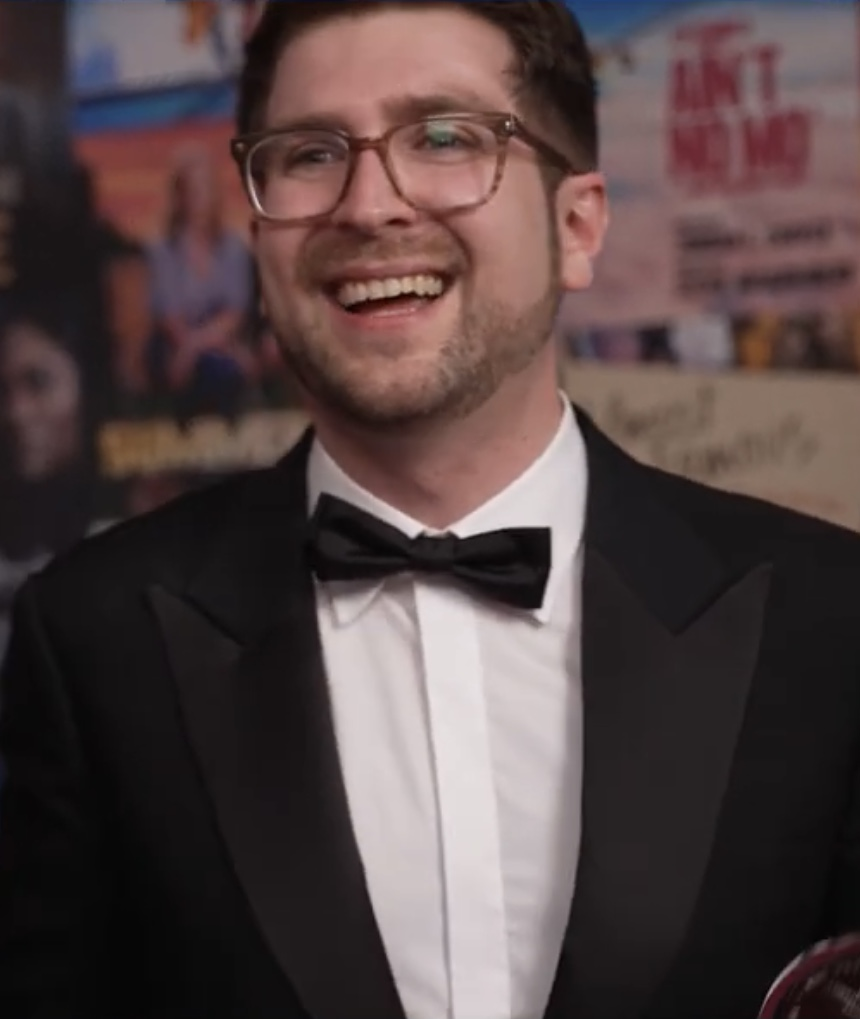
- Rosen at the 76th Tony Awards in 2023
- Born: July 20, 1990 (age 36); Los Angeles, California, U.S.
- Education: Berklee College of Music
- Occupations: Musician; composer; arranger; orchestrator; music director; music producer
- Years active: 2005–present
- Website: www.charlierosen.com

Charlie Rosen (born July 20, 1990) is an American musician, composer, arranger, orchestrator, musical director, and music producer. He is best known for his work on Broadway, where he has worked on Be More Chill, Prince of Broadway, American Psycho, and, along with Bryan Carter, won the 2023 Tony Award for Best Orchestrations for Some Like It Hot. He is also the leader of the 8-Bit Big Band, a jazz orchestra specializing in video game music.

== Early life ==
Rosen was born in Los Angeles, California, as the son of a bassoonist and organist. He was taught piano by his mother, starting from the age of three. At the age of fifteen, he joined the onstage band for the Los Angeles production of 13. He moved to New York at the age of seventeen to make his Broadway debut in 13, where he was a swing. He later attended Berklee College of Music for four semesters.

== Career ==
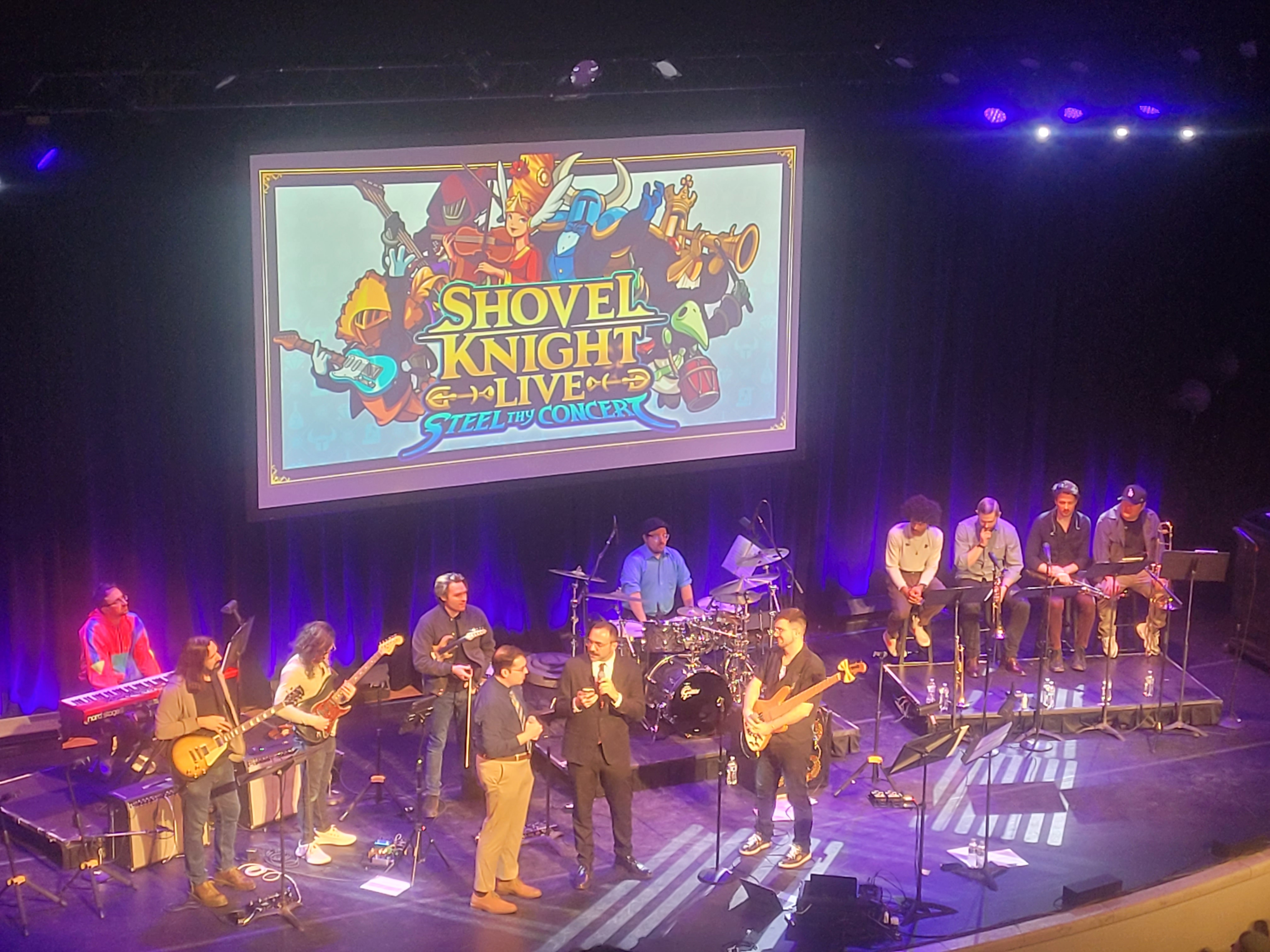
A Shovel Knight concert where Rosen assembled and led the band and arranged the tracks. Rosen and composer Jake Kaufman are in the center.

Rosen began his professional career as a swing musician for the bass, guitar, and percussion tracks of 13. Starting in 2012, he was the bandleader of Charlie Rosen's Broadway Big Band, where he arranged classic musical theater numbers into music that could be performed by a jazz orchestra with Broadway performers as the vocalists. As of April 2019, he primarily features as a guitarist in the Broadway musical Be More Chill.

Rosen can play about 70 musical instruments including the "flugelbone", melodica, Fender Rhodes, and theremin. Of these he has described the flugelbone as his "orchestrating secret weapon" due to its ability to utilize variety of timbres. However, he considers himself primarily a bassist but uses the range of instruments in his repertoire to improve the quality of the music he is able to create.

In 2017, Rosen founded the 8-Bit Big Band, a jazz and pops orchestra, in which he serves as the director. The band have won two Grammy Award for arrangements for the songs "Meta Knight's Revenge", from the game Kirby Super Star (1996), in 2022 and "Super Mario Praise Break" in 2026, and were also nominated in 2024.

Rosen is also the composer on 2021 comedy film Here Today.

== Credits ==
=== Theater ===
Year(s)	Production	Role	Location	Category	Ref.
2008	13	Swing bass, guitar, percussion	Bernard B. Jacobs Theatre	Broadway	
2010	Bloody Bloody Andrew Jackson	Associate conductor Bass	Bernard B. Jacobs Theatre	Broadway	
2011	The Amazing Adventures of Dr. Wonderful (And Her Dog!)	Orchestrator; Track production	John F. Kennedy Center for the Performing Arts	Regional	
2012	One Man, Two Guvnors	Lead guitar/drums/lead singer (understudy); Music director Bass	Music Box Theatre	Broadway	
2012	Cyrano de Bergerac	Music	American Airlines Theatre	Broadway	
2013	The Black Suits	Music director Orchestrator	Center Theatre Group	Regional	
2014	Soon	Arranger; Orchestrator	Signature Theatre	Regional	
2015	Honeymoon in Vegas	Orchestrations	Nederlander Theatre	Broadway	
2015	Be More Chill	Orchestrator	Two River Theater	Regional	
2015	The Visit	Guitar/Zither/Mandolin	Lyceum Theatre	Broadway	
2015	A Little More Alive	Orchestrator	Barrington Stage Company	Regional	
2016	American Psycho	Associate music director Keyboard/Guitar 2	Gerald Schoenfeld Theatre	Broadway	
2016	Broadway Bounty Hunter	Music supervisor Orchestrator	Barrington Stage Company	Regional	
2017	A Legendary Romance	Music director Orchestrator	Williamstown Theatre Festival	Regional	
2017	A Midsummer Night's Dream	Orchestrator	The Public Theater	Off-Broadway	
2017	Prince of Broadway	Associate orchestrator	Samuel J. Friedman Theatre	Broadway	
2018	Be More Chill	Orchestrator; Music supervisor Guitar 2/Ukulele	Pershing Square Signature Center	Off-Broadway	
2018	Miss You Like Hell	Orchestrator	The Public Theater	Off-Broadway	
2018	Pamela's First Musical	Orchestrator	Two River Theater	Regional	
2019	Be More Chill	Orchestrator; Music supervisor Guitar 2/Ukulele	Lyceum Theatre	Broadway	
2019	Broadway Bounty Hunter	Music supervisor Orchestrator	Greenwich House Theater	Off-Broadway	
2019	Moulin Rouge!	Co-orchestrations (horn)	Al Hirschfeld Theatre	Broadway	
2019	Love in Hate Nation	Music Supervisor; Orchestrator	Two River Theater	Regional	
2019	A Strange Loop	Orchestrations	Playwrights Horizons	Off-Broadway	
2019	A Strange Loop	Orchestrations	Lyceum Theatre	Broadway	
2022	Some Like It Hot	Co-orchestrations	Shubert Theatre	Broadway	
2023	Guys and Dolls	Orchestrations	Bridge Theatre	London	
2026	Beaches	Orchestrations	Majestic Theatre	Broadway	

Year(s)	Title	Role	Ref.
2016	Maya & Marty	Musical director	
2017–2018	The President Show	Composer; Music producer	
2018	The Marvelous Mrs. Maisel	Track production Guitar recording	

=== Film ===
Year(s)	Title	Role	Ref.
2021	Here Today	Composer	
2021	Listening to Kenny G	Composer	
2023	Wonka	Music Producer	

=== Podcasts ===
Year(s)	Title	Role	Ref.
2026	Sonic the Hedgehog Presents: The Chaotix Casefiles	Composer	

== Awards and nominations ==
Year	Award	Category	Nominated work	Result	Ref.
2015	Drama Desk Award	Outstanding Orchestrations	Honeymoon in Vegas	Nominated	
2018	Drama Desk Award	Outstanding Orchestrations	Miss You Like Hell	Nominated	
2019	Drama Desk Award	Outstanding Orchestrations	Be More Chill	Nominated	
2020	Obie Award	Special Citation	A Strange Loop	Won	
2020	Tony Award	Best Orchestrations	Moulin Rouge!	Won	
2022	Grammy Award	Best Arrangement, Instrumental or A Cappella	"Meta Knight's Revenge (From Kirby Super Star)"	Won	
2022	Tony Award	Best Orchestrations	A Strange Loop	Nominated	
2023	Tony Award	Best Orchestrations	Some Like It Hot	Won	
2024	Grammy Award	Best Musical Theater Album	Some Like It Hot	Won	
2024	Laurence Olivier Award	Outstanding Musical Contribution	Guys and Dolls (with Tom Brady for Musical Supervision & Arrangements)	Nominated	
2025	Grammy Award	Best Arrangement, Instrumental and Vocals	"Last Surprise" (From "Persona 5")	Nominated	
2026	Grammy Award	Best Arrangement, Instrumental or A Cappella	"Super Mario Praise Break"	Won	
2026	Grammy Award	Best Large Jazz Ensemble Album	Orchestrator Emulator	Nominated	
