= Lauren Marcus =

American actress (born 1985)

- Born: November 27, 1985 (age 40)
- Education: New Trier High School; James I. O'Neill High School; New York University, Steinhardt; Royal Conservatoire of Scotland
- Occupations: Actress, singer, songwriter
- Spouse: Joe Iconis
- Children: 1
- Website: laurenmarcus.com

Lauren Marcus (born November 27, 1985) is an American actress, singer and songwriter. She is best known for originating the role of Brooke Lohst in the musical Be More Chill.

== Early life and education ==
Marcus was raised in the suburbs of Chicago, and attended New Trier High School for three years before relocating to Garrison, NY, where she attended James I. O'Neill High School. She attended New York University's Vocal Performance program at the Steinhardt School of Education, and received a Bachelor of Music. Marcus received her Master of Arts at The Royal Conservatoire of Scotland, where she studied acting.

== Career ==
Marcus made her Broadway debut as Brooke Lohst in Be More Chill at the Lyceum Theatre in February 2019, after originating the role first at Two River Theatre in 2015, and then again off-Broadway at the Signature Theatre in the summer of 2018.

She appeared as Amy in Company at Barrington Stage Company alongside Aaron Tveit. She received praise for her performance.

In winter 2018, she played Brigid in The Humans at the St. Louis Repertory Theatre, and was subsequently nominated for a BroadwayWorld Regional Theatre Award as Best Supporting Actress in a Drama. She also received a JJ Award from the St. Louis Post Dispatch for her performance alongside Kathleen Wise.

Marcus is also a singer and songwriter, and performs regularly with her band around New York City. She released her debut EP, Never Really Done with You, in July 2016 at Joe's Pub.

Marcus appears in the 2021 American biographical musical drama film Tick, Tick... Boom!.

In January 2022, Marcus co-starred in Punk Rock Girl, a new musical that premiered at The Argyle Theatre in Babylon Village, NY. Later in 2022, she signed on as understudy for Beth Ann, played by Caissie Levy, in Sarah Silverman's play The Bedwetter at Atlantic Theatre Company, and performed on several dates while Levy was out sick. In September and October of 2022, Marcus played Tzeitzel in the Lyric Opera's production of Fiddler on the Roof.

In 2023, it was announced that Marcus would be co-writing the book for a stage musical adaptation of the 1985 movie Girls Just Want to Have Fun.

== Personal life ==
Marcus has been married to musical theatre writer Joe Iconis since 2015. They reside in New York City and frequently work together. In April 2024, she gave birth to their first child.

== Theater credits ==
Year	Production	Role	Venue	Level of production
2012	Pregnancy Pact	Jenn	Weston Playhouse	Regional
2014	The Marvelous Wonderettes	Suzy	Weston Playhouse	Regional
2015	Merrily We Roll Along	Mary Flynn	Sharon Playhouse	Regional
2015	Be More Chill	Brooke Lohst	Two River Theatre	Regional
2015	Little Shop of Horrors	Audrey	Sharon Playhouse	Regional
2017	Beatsville	Carla	Asolo Rep	Regional
2017	Company	Amy	Barrington Stage Co.	Regional
2018	The Humans	Bridgid	St. Louis Rep	Regional
2018	Be More Chill	Brooke Lohst	Signature Theatre	Off-Broadway
2019	Be More Chill	Brooke Lohst	Lyceum Theatre	Broadway
2019	Love in Hate Nation	Ms.Asp	Two River Theatre	Regional
2020	Little Shop of Horrors	Audrey	Pittsburgh Public Theater	Regional
2022	Punk Rock Girl	Patricia	The Argyle Theatre	Regional
2022	The Bedwetter	Beth-Ann u/s	Atlantic Theater Company	Off-Broadway
2022	Fiddler on the Roof	Tzeitzel	Lyric Opera	Regional
2023	White Girl In Danger	Meagan Whitehead	Kiser Theatre	Off-Broadway
