= Jason Tam =

American actor and dancer (born 1982)

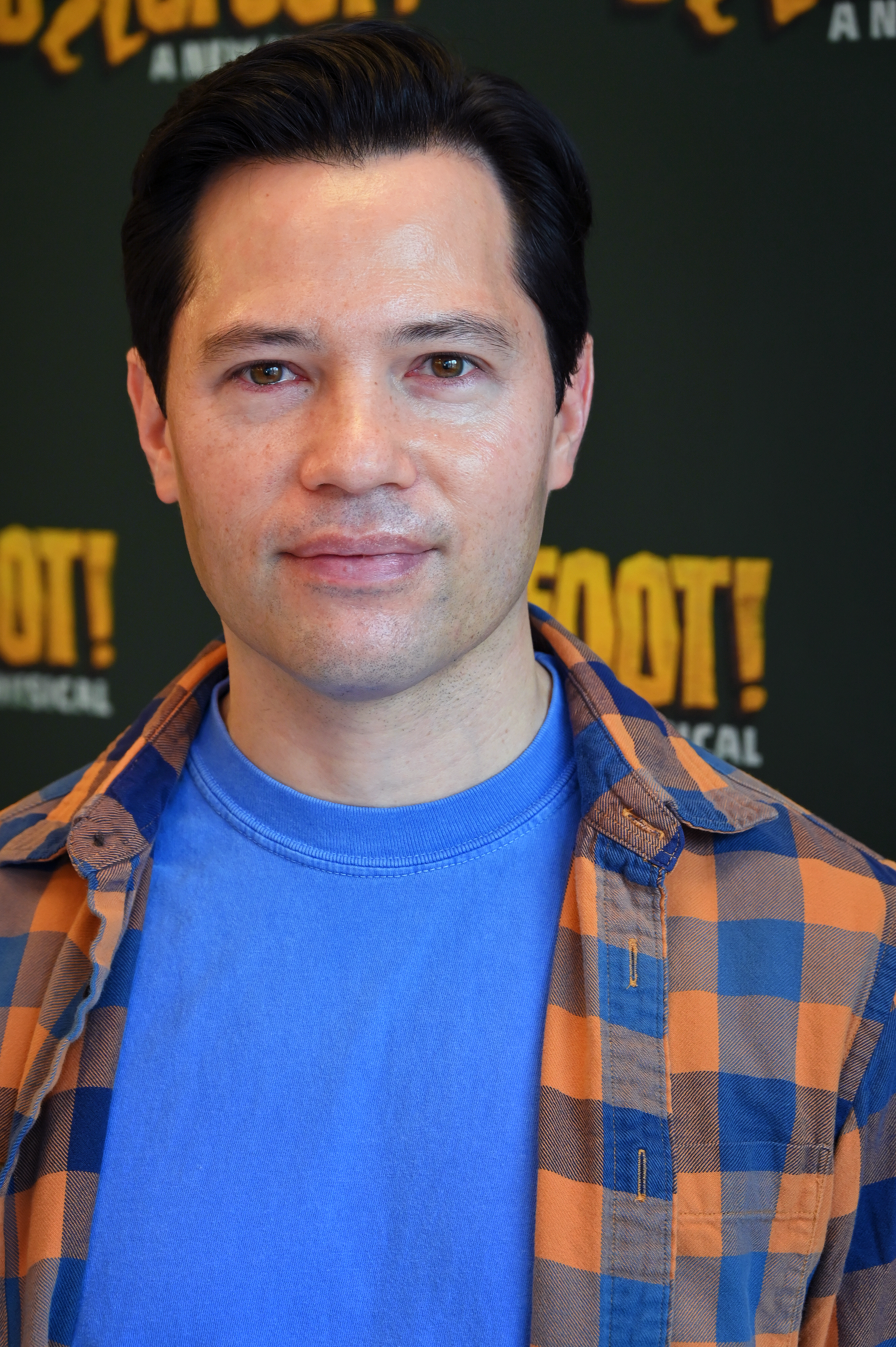
- Tam in 2026
- Born: June 28, 1982 (age 44); Honolulu, Hawaii
- Occupation: Actor
- Years active: 2006–present

Jason Woodward Kalei'ihauola Tam (born June 28, 1982) is an actor and dancer, born in Honolulu, Hawaii. He is of mixed Chinese, Hawaiian, and European descent. He graduated from Punahou School for high school and went to CAP 21 in New York City for musical theatre. His most notable roles include Markko Rivera on the daytime soap opera One Life to Live, Paul in the 2006 revival of the Broadway musical A Chorus Line (he was also featured in Every Little Step, a documentary about the auditions and casting for that production), the SQUIP in both the Off-Broadway and Broadway run of Be More Chill, of Xander in Lysistrata Jones on Broadway and Shoe on the teen drama Beyond the Break. His other stage performances include Les Misérables on Broadway, She Loves Me at The Guthrie Theatre, West Side Story, Oklahoma!, Footloose the Sacramento Music Circus, and King and I at Casa Manana. He is also a frequent collaborator with musical theatre writer Joe Iconis. In 2014 he joined the original cast of the Tom Kitt and Brian Yorkey collaboration If/Then at the Richard Rodgers Theater as David. He played the role for the entire run of If/Then. He can be heard on the 2014 Broadway’s Carols for a Cure album.

On April 1, 2018, he appeared in the live televised concert rendition of Andrew Lloyd Webber and Tim Rice's Jesus Christ Superstar as the apostle Peter. He starred as the SQUIP in the Off-Broadway run of Joe Iconis' Be More Chill from July through September 2018, and again on Broadway starting on March 10, 2019, and ending on August 11, 2019.

== Theatre credits ==
- Les Misérables, Gavroche (replacement) (1993)
- She Loves Me, Arpad Laszlo (2005)
- King and I, Prince Chulalongkorn (2006)
- A Chorus Line, Paul San Marco (2006–2008)
- The Black Suits, John Amoroso (2008)
- Lysistrata Jones, Xander Lee, (2011–2012)
- Marry Me A Little, Man (2012)
- If/Then, David, (2014–2015)
- Merrily We Roll Along, Franklin Shepard (2015)
- Dear Evan Hansen, Virtual Community Voices (2016–2022)
- KPOP, Epic (2017)
- Jesus Christ Superstar, Peter (2018)
- Be More Chill, The SQUIP (2018–2019)
- Fairycakes: the Play, The Prince/Cupid (2021)
- The Heart, Sean Lamar and others (2025)
- Bigfoot! The Musical, Doctor (2026)

== Discography ==
- A Chorus Line (revival Broadway cast recording) – 2006
- Marry Me A Little (Off-Broadway cast recording) – 2012
- If/Then (original Broadway cast recording) – 2014 (#19 on US charts)
- Broadway's Carols for a Cure: 2014 – 2014
- Jesus Christ Superstar Live in Concert (Original Soundtrack of the NBC Television Event) – 2018
- Be More Chill (Original Broadway Cast Recording) – 2019
- Album – 2022

== Filmography ==
Film and television
Year	Title	Role	Notes
2006–2009	Beyond the Break	Shoe	TV series, 35 episodes
2007–2012	One Life to Live	Markko Rivera	TV series, 280 episodes
2008	Every Little Step	Himself	Documentary
2008	Meet Dave	A Chorus Line Dancer	Film
2010	The In-Between	Trevor	Short
2010	A Lack of Gravity	Trevor	Short
2013	Guilty	Ian	TV Movie
2013	Hawaii Five-O	Eddie Thorne	TV series, 1 episode
2013	Do No Harm	Brandon	TV series, 4 episodes
2018	The Blacklist	Zeke	TV series, 1 episode
2018	Jesus Christ Superstar	Peter	NBC Live Televised Musical
2020	FBI: Most Wanted	Bobby Kao	TV series, 2 episodes
2020	Over the Moon	Background Vocals	Netflix
2021	Law and Order: Organized Crime	Father Lin	TV series, 1 episode
2022	Flirting, with Possibilities	Mike	Short
2023	Soil	(unnamed)	Short

== Awards and nominations ==
Year	Award	Category	Nominated work	Result	Ref.
2012	Astaire Award	Outstanding Male Dancer in a Broadway Show	Lysistrata Jones	Nominated	
2018	Lucille Lortel Award	Outstanding Featured Actor in a Musical	KPOP	Won	
2019	Grammy Award	Grammy Award for Best Musical Theater Album	Jesus Christ Superstar Live in Concert	Nominated	
