= Keith Sherman & Associates =

Global public relations and marketing firm

- Type: Public Relations & Marketing Firm
- Founded: 1989
- Headquarters: New York City, NY
- Key people: Keith Sherman (President & CEO)
- Website: www.ksa-pr.com

Keith Sherman & Associates, also known as (KSA), is a public relations, marketing, and communications company headquartered in Times Square, New York City. Specializing in entertainment, KSA represents a broad range of clients, including film, television, theatre, sports, major events, and multi-national corporations.

Most notably, KSA served as the exclusive communications firm for The Tony Awards for nearly two decades and The New York Times for 11 years. Other major clients include Fortune 500 professional services firm Marsh McLennan, the world's oldest and largest cancer center Memorial-Sloan Kettering, and Montreal International Jazz Festival, the largest jazz festival in the world.

== History ==
KSA was founded by Keith Sherman in 1989, after working as an executive at the public relations firm Solters/Roskin/Friedman, and at the Roundabout Theatre Company.

In its over 35-year history, the firm has represented over 300 Broadway and Off-Broadway shows including Be More Chill, 42nd Street, We Will Rock You, A Christmas Story, Big River, Mike Birbiglia: The New One, and the Royal Shakespeare Company's Broadway stint.

They have represented numerous theatre award shows including as The Tony Awards, the Chita Rivera Awards, the Drama Desk Awards, and The New Dramatists Awards.

In the 1980s and 90s, KSA was the representative for numerous gymnastics and figure skating Olympic medalists including Michelle Kwan, Brian Boitano, Paul Hamm, Katarina Witt, Kristi Yamaguchi, Scott Hamilton, Paul Wylie, Tara Lapinski, Dorothy Hamill, and Sarah Hughes. KSA navigated major controversies at the time including the attack of Nancy Kerrigan by Tonya Harding and Brian Boitano's story of coming out as gay.

In September 2025, it was announced that KSA will once again lead international public relations for U.S. Figure Skating as it heads into the Olympic Winter Games in Milano in 2026.

In recent years, KSA has served as the publicist for The New York Times, 54 Below, The Bolshoi Ballet during their engagement at the Metropolitan Opera, Lincoln Center's David H. Koch Theater, Montreal International Jazz Festival, The Al Hirschfeld Foundation, Brand g Vacations, and The Pennsylvania Ballet during their engagement at New York City Center.

KSA has represented various celebrities including Liza Minnelli, Mike Birbiglia, Colin Quinn, Mandy Patinkin, Paul Hamm, Savion Glover, Michael Learned, and Michael Feinstein.
