= Be More Chill (musical) =

2015 musical by Joe Iconis

- Broadway promotional poster
- Music: Joe Iconis
- Lyrics: Joe Iconis
- Book: Joe Tracz
- Setting: New Jersey
- Basis: Be More Chill by Ned Vizzini
- Premiere: May 30, 2015: Two River Theatre, Red Bank, New Jersey
- Productions: 2015 New Jersey; 2018 Off-Broadway; 2019 Broadway; 2020 off-West End; 2021 West End; 2022 Japan

Be More Chill is a musical with original music and lyrics by Joe Iconis, and a book by Joe Tracz, based on the 2004 novel of the same name by Ned Vizzini. After a 2015 regional theatre production, the musical premiered off-Broadway in 2018. A Broadway production began previews on February 13, 2019, and officially opened on March 10, 2019. The Broadway production closed on August 11, 2019. An off West End production opened on February 18, 2020, and temporarily closed on March 16, 2020, due to the ongoing COVID-19 pandemic with the production being cancelled on June 3, 2020. In 2021, it was announced that the production, featuring the original London cast, would resume performances on the West End at the Shaftesbury Theatre for a 10-week run starting June 30.

As of 2018, a film adaptation is in development.

== Productions ==
=== New Jersey (2015) ===
The musical premiered on May 30, 2015, at the Two River Theater in Red Bank, New Jersey. It ran until June 28, 2015. The production was directed by Stephen Brackett and featured orchestrations by Charlie Rosen, music direction by Nathan Dame, and choreography by Chase Brock. It featured Will Connolly as Jeremy, Eric William Morris as The SQUIP (an acronym for "Super Quantum Unit Intel Processor"), George Salazar as Michael, and Stephanie Hsu as Christine, as well as Katie Ladner, Lauren Marcus, Jake Boyd, Gerard Canonico, Katlyn Carlson, and Paul Whitty. The musical was commissioned by Two River Theater in 2011 as part of their new play development program.

=== Off-Broadway (2018) ===
After mixed reviews in its out of town tryouts, the show did not receive another production. In early 2017, the show began to gain traction online. A cast recording of the original production entered Billboard Cast Album chart's Top 10 in July 2017. This accomplishment and its workshop success led to the show getting an Off-Broadway production in 2018.

Be More Chill ran Off-Broadway at the Irene Diamond Stage at the Pershing Square Signature Center. It began previews July 26, 2018, officially opening on August 9, 2018. It was originally scheduled to close on September 23, 2018, but was given a one-week extension after selling out and closed on September 30, 2018. This production featured several original cast members including Hsu, Salazar, Canonico, Carlson, and Marcus reprising their respective roles. New cast members included Will Roland as Jeremy, Jason Tam as the SQUIP, Britton Smith as Jake, Tiffany Mann as Jenna, and Jason "Sweettooth" Williams as Mr. Heere, and all other adult roles. The production also added Emily Marshall as music director.

=== Broadway (2019) ===
On September 5, 2018, a Broadway production was announced. Preview performances at the Lyceum Theatre began on February 13, 2019, and the show officially opened on March 10, 2019. The Broadway transfer was estimated to cost $9.5 million according to lead producer Jerry Goehring. On December 18, 2018, it was announced that the entire Off-Broadway cast would reprise their roles for the Broadway production. Understudies and covers for the Broadway production featured Cameron Bond, Anthony Chatmon II, Morgan Siobhan Green, Troy Iwata, Talia Suskauer, and Joel Waggoner. Both the Broadway and Off-Broadway productions were represented by long-time Broadway press agency, Keith Sherman & Associates. The production announced its closing on June 20, 2019, and closed on August 11, 2019, playing 30 previews and 177 performances.

=== Off-West End (2020) ===
Be More Chill announced a London run on September 29, 2019. Previews began at The Other Palace on February 12, 2020, with an opening night set for February 18, 2020. On December 9, 2019, casting for the London production was announced, with Scott Folan as Jeremy, Blake Patrick Anderson as Michael, Miracle Chance as Christine, and Stewart Clarke as the SQUIP. Other cast members included Renée Lamb, Millie O'Connell, Eloise Davies, James Hameed, Miles Paloma, and Christopher Fry. The set was changed from the Broadway set, with an LED screen being the main feature for backgrounds, and fewer physical set pieces. Although the production was scheduled to close on June 14, 2020, it was announced on June 3 that all remaining performances of the show would be cancelled following its early closure on March 16, 2020, due to the COVID-19 pandemic.

=== Cancelled Chicago production (2020) ===
On December 12, 2019, the show announced that it would open an 18-week limited engagement run in Chicago at the Apollo Theater. Previews were set to begin April 17, 2020, with an opening night set for April 26, 2020. However, because of the COVID-19 pandemic, the show's previews were postponed to July 7, 2020, and the opening night was moved to July 17, 2020. The cast was announced as Liam Oh as Jeremy, Jeremiah Alsop as Michael, Rebecca Hurd as Christine, Teresa LaGamba as Jenna, Michelle Lauto as Chloe, Eben K. Logan as Brooke, Billy Rude as Jake, Koray Tarhan as Rich, Alex Goodrich as Mr. Heere/Mr. Reyes, and an unannounced SQUIP. Due to challenges caused by the COVID-19 pandemic, Be More Chill announced that the production at the Apollo Theater has been cancelled.

=== West End (2021) ===
On May 14, 2021, it was announced that the production would transfer to London's West End, resuming performances at the Shaftesbury Theatre for a 10-week run, with most of the original London cast reprising their roles. Millie O'Connell and Renée Lamb would not reprise their roles as Chloe and Jenna, and would be replaced by Grace Mouat and Nathania Ong. The show opened on June 30 and closed on September 5, 2021.

=== Japanese production (2022) ===
On July 25, 2022, Be More Chill Japan began performances at the New National Theatre Playhouse in Tokyo, containing the same set design and script from London. After wrapping August 10, the show continued to run in Fukuoka and Osaka. The cast consisted of Kota Yabu, Seishiro Kato, Sayuri Inoue, Yuya Kido, Akiyoshi Utsumi, Ruki Saito, Marika Dandoy, Ayaka Larrison, Bro Tom, and Daisuke Yokoyama

== Plot ==
=== Act One ===
Jeremy Heere, a high school junior, is a social outcast. He lives with his recently separated father, who works from home and makes Jeremy uncomfortable by repeatedly refusing to wear pants in the house. At school, Jeremy is bullied by popular student Rich Goranski. His best friend, Michael Mell, also bullied by Rich, tries to comfort Jeremy by telling him that being a loser is okay. Jeremy's long-time crush Christine Canigula signs up for the school play, which prompts him to do so as well, despite being made fun of for it. Jeremy wonders if someone can help him to become popular ("More Than Survive"). As they wait for the first play rehearsal to begin, Christine professes her love and passion for theatre to Jeremy ("I Love Play Rehearsal"). The drama teacher, Mr. Reyes, reveals that the school play will be A Midsummer Night's Dream set in a post-apocalyptic future, re-titled A Midsummer Nightmare (About Zombies). During rehearsal, Jake Dillinger, one of the popular boys, flirts with Christine, making Jeremy jealous ("More Than Survive (Reprise)").

Later, Jeremy is tormented in the bathroom by Rich, who tells Jeremy how he managed his rise to popularity: as an unpopular freshman, he took a pill called a Super Quantum Unit Intel Processor (SQUIP) containing a computer that implants itself inside the user's brain and tells the user what to do and say. Taking pity on Jeremy, Rich suggests that he buy one in order to become cooler ("The SQUIP Song"). After school, while playing video games with Michael, Jeremy tells him about Rich's offer and considers if Rich is just scamming him. After an awkward conversation with his dad, Jeremy decides to check the SQUIP out. Jeremy assures Michael that, no matter what happens, they'll always be a team ("Two-Player Game").

The two visit the mall to buy the SQUIP from a dealer at Payless ShoeSource. Jeremy, as instructed, swallows it with green Mountain Dew. When the SQUIP activates, it causes Jeremy to panic in front of Christine and Jake ("The Squip Enters"). The SQUIP criticizes Jeremy's appearance, personality, and behavior, and tells him that everything about him is terrible ("Be More Chill, Pt. 1"). The SQUIP orders him to go to a store to buy a new Eminem shirt. When Jeremy picks up a woman's shirt and encounters two popular girls from school, Brooke Lohst and Chloe Valentine, the SQUIP helps Jeremy fabricate a story in order to connect with them both. They offer Jeremy a ride home ("Do You Wanna Ride?"), which the SQUIP demands he accept, but Jeremy declines because he does not wish to leave Michael in the mall. The girls leave, and the SQUIP lies to Jeremy, telling him that Michael has already left the mall. It tells him that in order for its plan to improve his social standing to work, Jeremy needs to obey every order it gives him ("Be More Chill, Pt. 2").

The next day, Jeremy heads to school with renewed confidence, wondering if he might be less invisible than before. The SQUIP delves into the inner psyche of the student body around him, giving Jeremy insight on the fears and insecurities of his peers. Jeremy's SQUIP syncs itself with Rich's, instantly making them friends. Jeremy heads confidently to the play rehearsal ("Sync Up"). Christine tells Jeremy about her feelings for a guy she knows, who Jeremy initially believes is himself, but who turns out to be Jake ("A Guy That I'd Kinda Be Into").

Afterward, the SQUIP informs Jeremy that Christine won't date him until his social standing drastically improves and encourages Jeremy to use an interested Brooke as a stepping stone to greater popularity. Jeremy starts a relationship with Brooke, while Jake asks Christine to come to his house ("Upgrade"). Overwhelmed, Jeremy asks the SQUIP to shut itself off for a few minutes. Immediately, Jeremy sees Michael and is elated but Michael states that Jeremy has been ignoring him all day. The SQUIP explains that it was using optic nerve blocking to block Michael from Jeremy's vision and that he has to abandon him in order to be more popular. Jeremy, deciding he is tired of being a loser, turns the optic nerve blocking back on, and leaves Michael as the SQUIP plots to further boost Jeremy's popularity ("Loser Geek Whatever").

=== Act Two ===
On Halloween, Jake hosts a large, unsupervised party featuring alcohol ("Halloween"). Christine arrives in her Juliet princess costume because of Jake's past compliment on it, hoping to please Jake, but he brushes her aside to party. Jeremy arrives to meet Brooke, but Chloe, who is jealous of her, tries to seduce Jeremy. Feeling uncomfortable, Jeremy tries to get away, but the SQUIP forces him to remain in the situation as it escalates to Chloe making out with Jeremy ("Do You Wanna Hang?"). Chloe also has Jeremy drink alcohol, causing the SQUIP to malfunction, and then feigns having sex with him after being caught, angering Jake and upsetting Brooke. Fleeing from Jake and the girls, Jeremy runs into a bathroom, where he finds Michael, who has crashed the party. Michael tries to warn Jeremy of the dangers of the SQUIP, having discovered that someone ended up in a mental hospital after going insane in trying to get rid of it. Jeremy accuses Michael of being jealous of his popularity and calls him a loser, storming out of the bathroom. Michael, devastated and angry, locks himself in the bathroom and experiences a panic attack as he mourns the loss of his only best friend ("Michael in the Bathroom"). Jeremy talks to Christine without the SQUIP's help and he asks her out in a burst of confidence ("A Guy That I'd Kinda Be Into (Reprise)"). Christine, who has found herself in an existential crisis after breaking up with Jake, declines.

Meanwhile, an erratic Rich goes around the party frantically asking people for Mountain Dew Red. Jeremy's SQUIP finally reactivates and reviews the events of the night. Foreseeing a disturbing outcome, the SQUIP prompts Jeremy to leave the party immediately. Rich, alone and desperate, threatens his SQUIP and picks up a lit jack-o'-lantern. The next morning, Jenna Rolan informs everyone, via phone calls, social media, and texting, that Rich had burned down Jake's house at the end of the party, sending both Rich and Jake to the hospital ("The Smartphone Hour (Rich Set a Fire)"). At home, Jeremy is confronted by his father, who is worried about Jeremy's new personality and change in attitude. Jeremy reprimands his father for his behavior since the divorce, calling him a loser as well. Shaken by Jeremy's words, Mr. Heere realizes that something is very wrong and that he must help him. He tracks down Michael, who reluctantly agrees to help, on the condition that Mr. Heere puts on pants and become a better father ("The Pants Song").

Jeremy encounters Christine, who is shaken and upset about the fire, and he realizes that the SQUIP knew the fire would happen and that he could've stayed at the party and helped. Unhappy with the relationships he has damaged, Jeremy angrily blames the SQUIP for his misfortunes. The SQUIP instead blames it on human error and tells Jeremy he can improve the lives of his fellow students by providing them all with SQUIPs. In Rich's locker, Jeremy finds a box full of SQUIPs, which he then pours into a beaker of Mountain Dew, intending to use it to replace the prop liquid everyone must drink during the school play("The Pitiful Children"). Later, as the play begins, Jeremy tries to convince Christine of the SQUIP's benefits. She is disgusted by the idea of it, causing Jeremy to doubt the plan. Anticipating this, the SQUIP has already begun to take over the cast. The SQUIP reveals its intention to sync the entire student body. Remembering Rich's episode at the party, Jeremy comes to a realization: Mountain Dew activates the SQUIP, while Mountain Dew Red, which has long been discontinued, deactivates it. Michael appears from the audience with a bottle of his own. He gives the bottle to Jeremy after making him apologize for his actions, but Jake, now with a SQUIP, dumps most of it out. The SQUIP reveals that Christine now has a SQUIP as well. Under its influence, she professes her love for Jeremy. However, Jeremy makes Christine drink the last of the red Mountain Dew, causing a chain reaction that deactivaties the rest of the SQUIPs ("The Play").

Jeremy wakes up in the hospital, sharing a room with Rich, who proudly comes out to Jeremy as bisexual and is finally ready to be who he really is. Michael visits Jeremy and the two reconcile, while Mr. Heere visits Jeremy as well to inform that he'll be a better dad. Surrounded and encouraged by his friends and family, Jeremy accepts that there will always be outside influences, but he needs to learn to make up his own mind instead. He asks Christine out again; she says yes, kissing him ("Voices in My Head").

== Musical numbers ==
† – Indicates a song not included on the Cast Album

Act 1

- "Jeremy's Theme" – Orchestra
- "More Than Survive" – Jeremy, Michael & Ensemble
- "I Love Play Rehearsal" – Christine
- "More Than Survive (Reprise)" – Jeremy (Note: Not included in the Original Two River Cast Recording, but included in the Original Broadway Cast Recording.)
- "The SQUIP Song" – Rich & Ensemble
- "The SQUIP Song (Reprise 1)" – Jeremy †
- "Two-Player Game" – Michael & Jeremy
- "The SQUIP Song (Reprise 2)" – Scary Stockboy †
- "The Squip Enters" – Orchestra
- "Be More Chill Pt. 1" – Squip, Jeremy & Mall People
- "Do You Wanna Ride?" – Brooke & Chloe
- "Be More Chill Pt. 2" – Squip, Jeremy & Mall People
- "Sync Up" – Jeremy, Squip, Jake, Rich, Chloe, Brooke, Jenna, Mr. Reyes & Ensemble (Note: Added to the Original Broadway production to replace "More Than Survive (Reprise 2)".)
- "More Than Survive (Reprise 2)" – Jeremy, Squip & Ensemble (Note: Removed in the Original Broadway production and replaced with "Sync Up".)
- "The SQUIP Lurks" – Orchestra (Note: Renamed "The SQUIP Stalks" in the Original Broadway production.)
- "A Guy That I'd Kinda Be Into" – Christine, Jeremy, Squip & Ensemble
- "Upgrade" – Brooke, Squip, Jeremy, Jake, Christine & Ensemble
- "Loser Geek Whatever" – Jeremy (Note: Added from the Original Off-Broadway production onwards.)

Act 2

- "Halloween" – Brooke, Jake, Chloe, Rich, Jenna & Ensemble
- "Do You Wanna Hang?" – Chloe
- "Michael in the Bathroom" – Michael & Ensemble
- "A Guy That I'd Kinda Be Into (Reprise)" – Christine & Jeremy (Note: Not included in the Original Two River Cast Recording, but included in the Original Broadway Cast Recording.)
- "The Smartphone Hour" – Jenna, Chloe, Brooke & Ensemble
- "The Pants Song" – Mr. Heere & Michael (Note: Prior to the Off-Broadway production, the order of "The Pants Song" and "The Pitiful Children" was reversed.)
- "The Pitiful Children" – Squip, Jeremy, Jenna & Ensemble
- "The Play" – Michael, Jake, Brooke, Chloe, Jeremy, Christine, Squip & Ensemble
- "Voices in My Head" – Mr. Heere, Michael, Rich, Jeremy, Jenna, Brooke, Chloe, Jake, Christine & Ensemble

== Roles and original casts ==
=== Original productions ===
Character	World Premiere	Workshop	Off-Broadway	Broadway	Off-West End	West End	Tokyo
Character	2015	2016	2018	2019	2020	2021	2022
Jeremy Heere	Will Connolly	Will Connolly	Will Roland	Will Roland	Scott Folan	Scott Folan	Kota Yabu
Michael Mell	George Salazar	George Salazar	George Salazar	George Salazar	Blake Patrick Anderson	Blake Patrick Anderson	Seishiro Kato
Christine Canigula	Stephanie Hsu	Stephanie Hsu	Stephanie Hsu	Stephanie Hsu	Miracle Chance	Miracle Chance	Sayuri Inoue
The SQUIP	Eric William Morris	Eric William Morris	Jason Tam	Jason Tam	Stewart Clarke	Stewart Clarke	Daisuke Yokoyama
Chloe Valentine	Katlyn Carlson	Katlyn Carlson	Katlyn Carlson	Katlyn Carlson	Millie O'Connell	Millie O'Connell	Ayaka Larrison
Brooke Lohst	Lauren Marcus	Lauren Marcus	Lauren Marcus	Lauren Marcus	Eloise Davies	Eloise Davies	Ruki Saito
Rich Goranski	Gerard Canonico	Gerard Canonico	Gerard Canonico	Gerard Canonico	James Hameed	James Hameed	Yuya Kido
Jenna Rolan	Katie Ladner	Katie Ladner	Tiffany Mann	Tiffany Mann	Renée Lamb	Renée Lamb	Marika Dandoy
Jake Dillinger	Jake Boyd	Heath Saunders	Britton Smith	Britton Smith	Miles Paloma	Miles Paloma	Akiyoshi Utsumi
Mr. Heere / Mr. Reyes / Scary Stockboy	Paul Whitty	Paul Whitty	Jason "SweetTooth" Williams	Jason "SweetTooth" Williams	Christopher Fry	Christopher Fry	Brother Tom

== Recording ==
The world premiere cast recorded an original cast album on July 21, 2015, which was released on October 31, 2015. The album has since received over 350 million streams online. The cast recording was released on vinyl by Ghostlight Records in July 2018. A recording of the song, "Loser Geek Whatever" was released as a single on November 29, 2018. An original Broadway cast album was recorded in March 2019, and released on May 3, 2019.

== Awards and honors ==
=== Original Off-Broadway production ===
Year	Award ceremony	Category	Nominee	Result
2019
2019	Lucille Lortel Awards	Outstanding Projection Design	Alex Basco Koch	Nominated
2019	Lucille Lortel Awards	Outstanding Featured Actress in a Musical	Stephanie Hsu	Nominated
2019	Lucille Lortel Awards	Outstanding Featured Actor in a Musical	George Salazar	Won
2019	Lucille Lortel Awards	Outstanding Musical		Nominated
2019	Off-Broadway Alliance Awards	Best New Musical		Nominated

=== Original Broadway production ===
Year	Award ceremony	Category	Nominee	Result
2019	Tony Awards	Best Original Score	Joe Iconis	Nominated
2019	Drama Desk Awards	Outstanding Musical		Nominated
2019	Drama Desk Awards	Outstanding Featured Actor in a Musical	George Salazar	Nominated
2019	Drama Desk Awards	Outstanding Featured Actress in a Musical	Stephanie Hsu	Nominated
2019	Drama Desk Awards	Outstanding Music	Joe Iconis	Nominated
2019	Drama Desk Awards	Outstanding Lyrics	Joe Iconis	Nominated
2019	Drama Desk Awards	Outstanding Orchestrations	Charlie Rosen	Nominated
2019	Drama Desk Awards	Outstanding Costume Design for a Musical	Bobby Frederick Tilly II	Nominated
2019	Drama Desk Awards	Outstanding Projection Design	Alex Basco Koch	Nominated
2019	Outer Critics Circle Awards	Outstanding New Broadway Musical		Nominated
2019	Outer Critics Circle Awards	Outstanding New Score	Joe Iconis	Nominated
2019	Outer Critics Circle Awards	Outstanding Featured Actor in a Musical	George Salazar	Nominated
2019	Outer Critics Circle Awards	Outstanding Projection Design	Alex Basco Koch	Nominated

== Reception ==
Despite a strong fan following online, the show has received mixed reviews from critics. Terry Teachout of The Wall Street Journal wrote, "Be More Chill is one of the strongest new musicals of the past decade, a charming, astutely crafted tale of neurotic post-millennial geeks in love whose appeal is in no way limited to those whom it portrays."

Peter Travers of Rolling Stone Magazine wrote: "The audiences who made this show happen digitally are now making pilgrimages to the Lyceum Theater to see those songs done live by a talented young cast with enough juice to ignite every light on Broadway.... By the time Jeremy belts out his final number, 'Voices in My Head,' you'll be hearing those voices, too, in a wow of a musical that comes on like gangbusters."

Reviewing the Off-Broadway production, Ben Brantley of The New York Times called the show "the theatrical equivalent of one of those high-pitched dog whistles that only those under 25 can hear," and said that the show would have little to offer for that outside of its tween fandom, as well as criticizing the poor lyricism. He updated his review after seeing the Broadway production and said that even though the show's production values have increased since the Off-Broadway production, it remains "a festival of klutziness" and "the worst of the lot, with a repetitive score, painfully forced rhymes, cartoonish acting and a general approach that mistakes decibel level (literally and metaphorically) for emotional intensity."

On the other hand, A. D. Amorosi of Variety called the Off-Broadway production "a memorable thrill ride, a zealously caffeinated high school musical." Of the Broadway version, Amorosi wrote: "Traditional theatergoing audiences that tend to be older than the teens and twentysomethings that packed the Off-Broadway run will find delicious favor in Iconis' contagious melodies and tricky lyrics...Be More Chill is Broadway's wiliest and socially savviest night out for teens and parents alike."

The Off-West End production received mostly positive reviews from critics. Arifa Akbar of The Guardian said the production was "gloriously like its own thing, filled with astute observation alongside delightfully silly humour and storming performances." Claire Allfree of The Telegraph called the production "a coming-of-age story with fabulous, catchy tunes."

== Film adaptation ==
On October 20, 2018, four months before the show opened on Broadway, it was announced that Shawn Levy's 21 Laps Entertainment and Greg Berlanti's Berlanti Productions would partner to produce a film adaptation of the musical, with Joe Iconis serving as executive producer. 20th Century Studios, who acquired the rights prior to their acquisition by The Walt Disney Company, will distribute. In August 2021, Levy confirmed that a script had been written for the project by the musical's creators, and that it was still in development.
