= Chase Brock =

American choreographer

- Occupations: Dancer, choreographer
- Years active: 2000 - present
- Spouse: Rob Berman

Chase Brock is an American choreographer working in theater and concert dance.

== Early life ==
Brock is originally from East Flat Rock, North Carolina. In the late 1990s, Brock attended the Broadway Theater Project, a musical theater summer intensive created by veteran actor, dancer, and choreographer Ann Reinking.

== Career ==
=== Theater ===
Brock made his Broadway debut dancing in the 2000 revival of The Music Man, directed and choreographed by Susan Stroman.

Early in his choreographic career, Brock assisted Reinking on the Broadway revue The Look of Love in 2003, structured around a compilation of songs by Burt Bacharach and Hal David. The same year, he assisted choreographer Kathleen Marshall on the Broadway revival of Wonderful Town.

In 2011, Brock joined the Broadway production of Spider-Man: Turn Off the Dark during its extended preview period to provide additional choreography. The 2013 revival of Picnic was Brock's first Broadway credit as principal choreographer.

Brock served as choreographer for the stage adaptation of Disney's The Hunchback of Notre Dame at the La Jolla Playhouse in 2014, as well as its subsequent remount at the Paper Mill Playhouse the following year and German-language productions in Stuttgart and Vienna.

Brock choreographed the 2015 tryout of the musical Waitress at American Repertory Theater, directed by Diane Paulus. Brock was replaced by Lorin Latarro when the production transferred to Broadway.

Be More Chill premiered in 2015 at Two River Theater with Brock as choreographer. In 2018 the production was remounted Off-Broadway and subsequently transferred to Broadway. Brock stayed with the show for its London debut at The Other Palace in 2020. He was scheduled to continue with the piece for a revamped production in Chicago, but the show was cancelled due to the COVID-19 pandemic. The 2021 West End revival of Be More Chill featured Brock's choreography, as did the 2022 Japanese tour.

In 2019 Brock choreographed another Disney stage adaptation—this time of the animated movie Hercules—as part of The Public Theater's Public Works series. The 2023 Paper Mill Playhouse production featured choreography by Brock and Tanisha Scott.

=== Chase Brock Experience ===
In 2006 Brock founded the Chase Brock Experience, a contemporary dance company showcasing his choreographic efforts. On the company, Brock has said, "My theatre work ... pays the bills—and my company work [is] where I make passion projects in dance."

=== Other projects ===
Brock choreographed the 2010 game Dance on Broadway for Nintendo Wii.

== Personal life ==
Brock is married to conductor Rob Berman. The couple owns a railway station converted into an artists' residence.

== Choreographic works ==
=== Concert dance ===
- 2007: Slow Float
- 2008: "Dusk," "The Four Seasons," "Mission: Implausible," "Warner Variations"
- 2009: "After Dark," "Curious Episode," "Double Solo," "Seeing Stars," "What A Wonderful World"; "American Sadness"
- 2010: "Mirror, Mirror," "Testify," "Whoa, Nellie!," "Zombie"
- 2012: The Nutcracker
- 2014: The Song That I Sing; Or, Meow So Pretty
- 2015: Splendor we only partially imagined
- 2017: Men I've Known
- 2018: The Girl With The Alkaline Eyes
- 2022: Big Shot
- 2026: "Come Home"

=== Theater ===
Year	Title	Venue(s)	Notes	Ref.
2005	Yank	Philadelphia Gay and Lesbian Theatre Festival		
2005	Yank	New York Musical Theatre Festival		
2006	Shenandoah	Ford's Theater, Washington, D.C.	co-choreographed with Jeff Calhoun	
2008	A Little Night Music	Center Stage, Baltimore		
2008	This Beautiful City	Studio Theatre, Washington, D.C.		
2011	Lost in the Stars	New York City Center		
2011	Spider-Man: Turn Off the Dark	Foxwoods Theater, Broadway	additional choreography	
2011	The Blue Flower	Second Stage Theater, Off-Broadway		
2012	Pippin	Kansas City Repertory Theatre		
2013	Venice	The Public Theater, Off-Broadway		
2013	The Cradle Will Rock	New York City Center		
2013	The Tempest	Delacorte Theater		
2013	Tamar of the River	Prospect Theater Company, Off-Broadway		
2013	Much Ado About Nothing	The Public Theater, Off-Broadway		
2014	The Mysteries	The Flea Theater, Off-Broadway		
2014	Irma La Douce	New York City Center		
2014	The Winter's Tale	Delacorte Theater		
2014	The Hunchback of Notre Dame	La Jolla Playhouse		
2015	The Hunchback of Notre Dame	Paper Mill Playhouse, New Jersey		
2015	Be More Chill	Two River Theater, New Jersey		
2015	Twelfth Night	Old Globe Theatre, San Diego		
2015	Gigantic	Theatre Row, Off-Broadway		
2016	The Wildness: Sky-Pony's Rock Fairy Tale	Ars Nova, Off-Broadway		
2016	Do I Hear a Waltz?	New York City Center		
2016	The Taming of the Shrew	Shakespeare Theatre Company, Washington, D.C.		
2016	My Fair Lady	Bay Street Theater, New York		
2017	A Midsummer Night's Dream	Delacorte Theater		
2017	Darling Grenadine	Goodspeed Musicals, Connecticut		
2018	Der Glöckner von Notre Dame	Apollo Theater, Stuttgart		
2018	SOUL: The Stax Musical	Center Stage, Baltimore		
2018	Be More Chill	Pershing Square Signature Center, Off-Broadway		
2019	Be More Chill	Lyceum Theatre, Broadway		
2019	Hercules	Delacorte Theater		
2020	Be More Chill	The Other Palace, Off-West End		
2021	Be More Chill	Shaftesbury Theatre, West End		
2022	Be More Chill	Japan national tour		
2022	Der Glöckner von Notre Dame	Ronacher, Vienna		
2023	Hercules	Paper Mill Playhouse	co-choreographed with Tanisha Scott	
2024	Esther	The George Theater, Houston		

== Filmography ==
Year	Title	Episode	Role	Notes
2015	Last Week Tonight with John Oliver	"Paid Family Leave"	choreographer	
2019	Encore!	"Fiddler on the Roof"	self - theater director	
2020	Dash & Lily	"Hanukkah"	choreographer	
2021	The Joy is in the Work: Remembering Ann Reinking		director	

== Awards and nominations ==
Year	Award	Category	Nominated work	Result	Ref.
2013	Lucille Lortel Award	Outstanding Choreographer	The Blue Flower	Nominated	
2014	Joe A. Callaway Award	Choreography	Tamar of the River	Nominated	
