= One Penny =

One Penny may refer to:

== Currency ==
The penny is or has been a unit of currency in some countries. Coins inscribed "One Penny" have included:

=== In use ===
- Penny (British decimal coin), worth one hundredth of a British pound
- Penny (United States coin), worth one hundredth of a US dollar
- Penny (Canadian coin), worth one hundredth of a Canadian dollar

=== Distribution ceased ===
- Penny (British pre-decimal coin), worth one two-hundred-and-fortieth of a British pound (demonetised 1971)
- Penny (Australian coin), worth one hundredth of an Australian pound (demonetised 1966)

== In film ==
- One Penny (2017 film)

== See also ==
- Penny (disambiguation)
