= Will Roland =

American actor and singer

- Born: March 5, 1989 (age 37); New York City, U.S.
- Education: Friends Academy
- Alma mater: New York University
- Occupations: Actor, singer
- Years active: 2011–present
- Spouse: Stephanie Wessels (m. 2022)
- Children: 1
- Website: www.will-roland.com

William Frederick Roland (born March 5, 1989) is an American actor and singer, best known for originating the role of Jared Kleinman in the Broadway musical Dear Evan Hansen, for which he received a Grammy and Daytime Emmy Award. On film, he is known for his role in the drama film One Penny. Most recently, he played the lead role of Jeremy Heere in the musical Be More Chill both off-Broadway and on Broadway.

== Early life and education ==
William Frederick Roland was born on March 5, 1989 was born in New York City. After initially living in Greenwich Village, his family moved to Locust Valley, Long Island, when he was eight years old.

He attended Friends Academy for middle school and high school. Roland graduated from New York University in 2011 with a degree in musical theater from Steinhardt School of Culture, Education, and Human Development.

== Career ==
Roland's first professional role after graduating from college was in 2011, where he played the role of Ian DeForge in The Bus at 59e59 Theaters. The show opened on October 4, 2011, and closed on October 31, 2011.

In 2012, Roland played the role of Nato Obenkrieger from August 16, 2012, to September 2, 2012, in a staged workshop of The Black Suits, a musical by Joe Iconis in The Berkshires at the Barrington Stage Company. In this production, he played alongside Ben Platt, who he would again star beside in Dear Evan Hansen. Roland reprised this role in 2013 from October 27, 2013, to November 24, 2013, in Los Angeles, California, for the show's world premiere at the Center Theatre Group.

In April 2013, Roland participated in the first reading of Be More Chill, in which he read the role of Michael. He then departed the production and re-auditioned for the lead in 2015 when it was casting for its world premiere, whereupon he did not get cast. Around this time, he also became involved in the as then Untitled PPL Project. Starting in July 2014, Roland participated in readings and workshops of the show that would become Dear Evan Hansen, playing the role of Jared Kleinman. The show made its premiere in Washington, D.C. at the Arena Stage and ran from July 10, 2015, to August 23, 2015.

While in Washington, D.C. for the workshop and original production of Dear Evan Hansen, and Roland was also cast as Collin in the independent film One Penny. Principal photography occurred in 2015. The film premiered at the DC Independent Film Festival in February 2017. He was nominated for Best Supporting Actor at the Northern Virginia International Film and Music Festival in 2017.

In 2016, Roland reprised his role as Jared when Dear Evan Hansen went Off-Broadway for a limited engagement run at the Second Stage Theatre. Previews began March 26, 2016. The show opened on May 1, 2016, and ran until May 29, 2016. After selling out its Off-Broadway run, the show then transferred to Broadway at the Music Box Theatre. Previews began November 14, 2016 and the show opened on December 4, 2016. Roland departed the show on June 10, 2018.

In 2017, Roland was approached by the showrunners of Billions after seeing his performance in Dear Evan Hansen. He was offered an audition for a guest role, which turned into the recurring role of Winston, who Roland portrayed starting in season 3 of Billions.

On April 13, 2018, it was announced that Roland would play the role of Jeremy Heere in Joe Iconis' Be More Chill Off-Broadway limited engagement run at the Pershing Square Signature Center. Previews began July 26, 2018. The show opened August 9, 2018 and closed on September 30, 2018, after a one-week extension. Through Ghostlight Records, Roland released a new song called "Loser Geek Whatever" that had been introduced to the show as the new act 1 finale for its Off-Broadway run. After its sold out Off-Broadway run, Roland reprised the role when the show then transferred to Broadway at the Lyceum Theatre. Previews began February 13, 2019. The show opened March 10, 2019 and closed August 11, 2019.

In 2021, he played the role of Zeke Matthews in the studio cast recording of Goosebumps The Musical: Phantom of the Auditorium. He starred alongside Krystina Alabado and Noah Galvin. In 2023, he starred in the world premiere of the musical Summer Stock at the Goodspeed Opera House. Also in 2023, Roland was in the studio cast recording of 17 Again: The Musical.

== Personal life ==
On November 7, 2018, Roland became engaged to his longtime girlfriend, Stephanie Wessels. They were married in June 2022 and welcomed their first child in October 2025.

== Credits ==
=== Theatre ===
Year	Title	Role	Venue	Category
2011	The Bus	Ian DeForge	59e59 Theaters	Off-Broadway
2012	Billy Witch	Michael	Astoria Performing Arts Center	Off-Broadway
2012	Wonderful Town	Frank Lippencott	Gallery Players	Off-Broadway
2012	The Black Suits	Nato Obenkrieger	Barrington Stage Company	Regional
2013	The Black Suits	Nato Obenkrieger	Center Theatre Group	Regional
2014	Academia Nuts!	Joseph McCutter	New York Musical Festival	Off-Broadway
2015	Dear Evan Hansen	Jared Kleinman	Arena Stage	Regional
2016	Dear Evan Hansen	Jared Kleinman	Second Stage Theater	Off-Broadway
2016–2018	Dear Evan Hansen	Jared Kleinman	Music Box Theater	Broadway
2018	Be More Chill	Jeremy Heere	Pershing Square Signature Center	Off-Broadway
2019	Be More Chill	Jeremy Heere	Lyceum Theater	Broadway
2021	Goosebumps the Musical: Phantom of the Auditorium	Zeke Matthews	N/A	Original Studio Cast Recording
2022	The Panic of 29'	Jimmy Armstrong	59e59 Theaters	Off-Broadway
2023	Summer Stock	Orville Wingate	Goodspeed Opera House	World Premiere Original Cast
2024	Little Shop of Horrors	Seymour Kelborn	Guthrie Theater	Regional
2025	The Baker's Wife	Priest	Classic Stage Company	Off-Broadway

=== Film ===
Year	Title	Role
2017	One Penny	Collin

=== Television ===
Year	Title	Role	Category
2015	The Mysteries of Laura	Nerd #3	Episode: "The Mystery of the Intoxicated Intern"
2016	Red Oaks	Joel	2 episodes
2018–2023	Billions	Winston	33 episodes
2018	Unbreakable Kimmy Schmidt	Quidditch Player	Episode: "Kimmy Meets an Old Friend!"
2023	Foul Play	Friedrich Appleseed/Bug Draper	2 episodes

== Awards and nominations ==
Year	Association	Category	Work	Result	Ref.
2017	Northern Virginia International Film and Music Festival	Best Supporting Actor – Feature Film	One Penny	Nominated	
2017	Broadway.com Audience Choice Award	Favorite Funny Performance	Dear Evan Hansen	Won	
2017	Broadway.com Audience Choice Award	Favorite Breakthrough Performance (Male)	Dear Evan Hansen	Nominated	
2017	Broadway.com Audience Choice Award	Favorite Featured Actor in a Musical	Dear Evan Hansen	Nominated	
2018	Grammy Awards	Best Musical Theater Album	Dear Evan Hansen	Won	
2018	Daytime Emmy Awards	Outstanding Musical Performance in a Daytime Program	"You Will Be Found" from Dear Evan Hansen on The Today Show	Won	
2019	Broadway.com Audience Choice Award	Favorite Leading Actor in a Musical	Be More Chill	Nominated	
2019	Broadway.com Audience Choice Award	Favorite Onstage Pair (with George Salazar)	Be More Chill	Won	
2019	Broadway.com Audience Choice Award	Favorite Onstage Pair (with Stephanie Hsu)	Be More Chill	Nominated	
2019	BroadwayWorld Theatre Fans' Choice Awards	Best Leading Actor in a Musical	Be More Chill	Won	
2024	32nd Annual Connecticut Critics Circle Awards	Outstanding Featured Actor in a Musical	Summer Stock	Nominated	
