= The 8-Bit Big Band =

Video game jazz ensemble

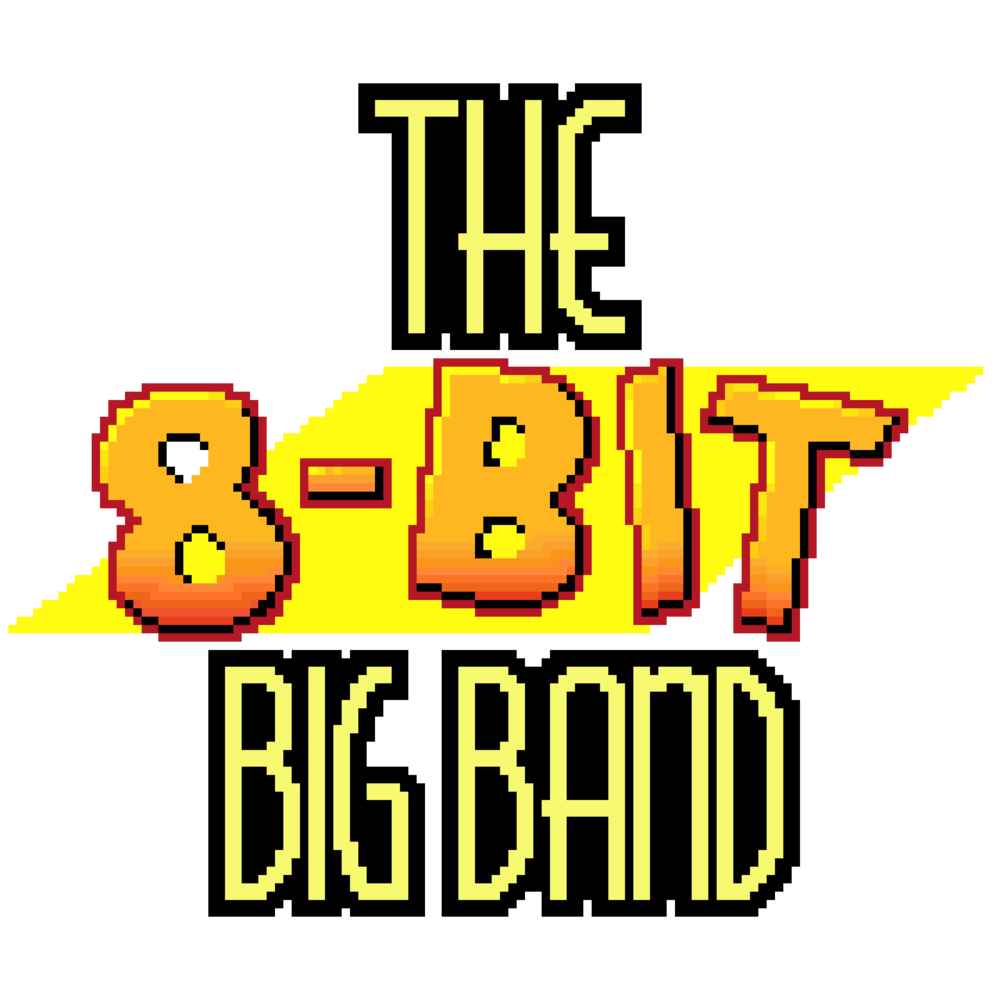

Background information
- Origin: New York City
- Genres: Jazz; video game music
- Years active: 2017–present
- Members: Charlie Rosen
- Website: the8bitbigband.com

The 8-Bit Big Band is a jazz and pops orchestra directed by Charlie Rosen that specializes in jazz arrangements of video game music. The band won the Grammy Award for Best Arrangement, Instrumental or A Cappella in 2022 and 2026, and were nominated for two other Grammy Awards.

== History ==
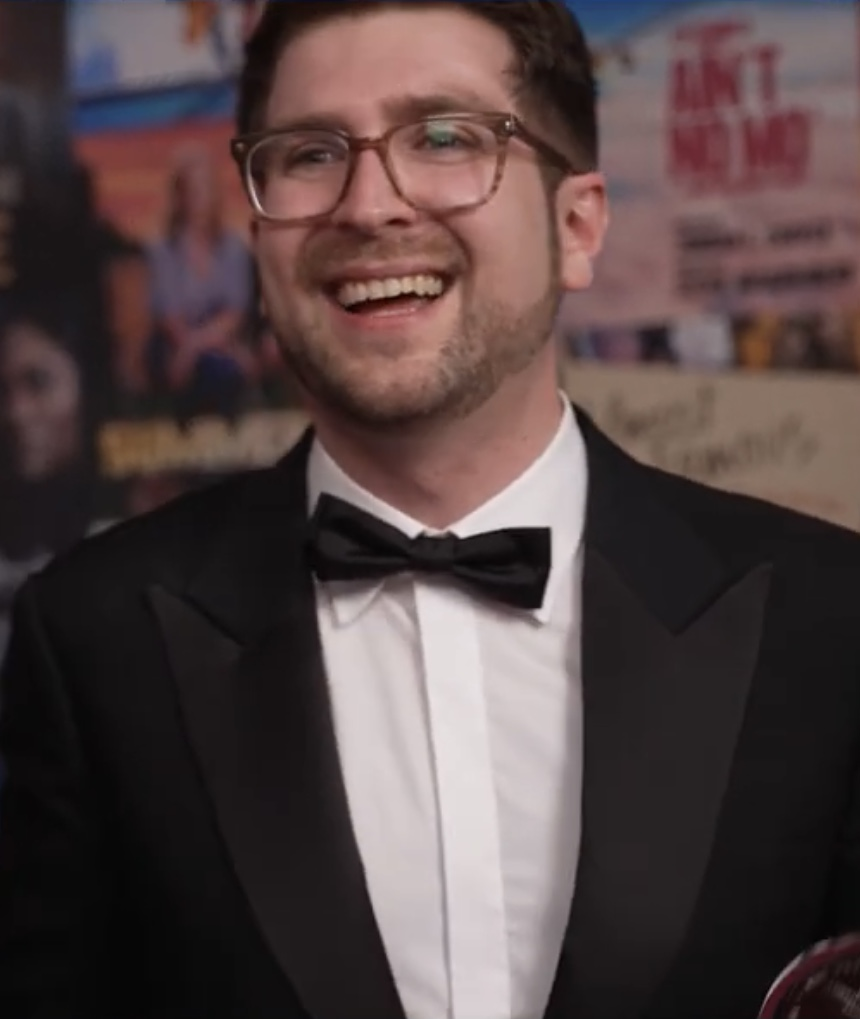
Charlie Rosen directs the 8-Bit Big Band.

The 8-Bit Big Band was founded in 2017 by Charlie Rosen, who also serves as the director. He did not initially anticipate that the project would be successful in the long term, but it received a positive community response online – particularly on YouTube, which he likened to the "Tin Pan Alley of video game music". Primarily based in New York City, the band plays arrangements of popular video game songs – which Rosen refers to as "the great video game songbook" – from titles such as Mario Kart 64 (1996) and The Legend of Zelda: Ocarina of Time (1998). Rosen's background in Broadway theater music led him to incorporate elements of its musical style in his work. Will Friedwald of The New York Sun compared many of the band's arrangements to the compositions of Quincy Jones and Stevie Wonder. The band features around 30 performers, most of whom join temporarily, or are hired locally when the band tours. The band's live performances also feature guest performers such as Grace Kelly and Leo Pellegrino.

In a collaboration with Button Masher, the band arranged the song "Meta Knight's Revenge", from the game Kirby Super Star (1996), which appeared on their studio album Backwards Compatible in 2021. In 2022, it was awarded the Grammy Award for Best Arrangement, Instrumental or A Cappella, one of the few times a video game score had been considered at the event, and the first time a song from a Nintendo game had won. In 2023, the band covered the song "Last Surprise", from Persona 5 (2016); PC Gamer's Mollie Taylor appreciated the reworking, finding "extra jazzy vibes along with a sprinkling of some more retro digitized sound bites." The arrangement received a nomination for Best Arrangement, Instrumental and Vocals in 2024.

== Accolades ==
Accolades received by the 8-Bit Big Band
Award ceremony	Year	Category	Nominated work	Result	Ref.
Grammy Awards	2022	Best Arrangement, Instrumental or A Cappella	"Meta Knight's Revenge"	Won	
Grammy Awards	2025	Best Arrangement, Instrumental and Vocals	"Last Surprise"	Nominated	
Grammy Awards	2026	Best Arrangement, Instrumental or A Cappella	"Super Mario Praise Break"	Won	
Grammy Awards	2026	Best Large Jazz Ensemble Album	Orchestrator Emulator	Nominated	

== Discography ==
- Press Start! (2018)
- Choose Your Character! (2019)
- Backwards Compatible (2021)
- Game Changer (2023)
- Orchestrator Emulator (2025)
