= Summer Stock (musical) =

Musical based on the 1950 film of the same name

- Music: Various Artists
- Lyrics: Various Artists
- Book: Cheri Steinkellner
- Basis: Summer Stock (1950); By: Sy Gomberg; George Wells
- Productions: 2023 Goodspeed Opera House

Summer Stock is a musical with a book by Cheri Steinkellner. The show includes many of the songs from the original 1950 film of the same name that starred Judy Garland and Gene Kelly, including Get Happy.

The musical is set in the 1950s in New England, where Jane Falbury runs her family farm. Her sister Gloria returns home with her touring vaudeville troupe, offering to let them use their barn as a theatre to rehearse a new show. Trouble ensues when Jane falls for Joe, the group's stage director. Meanwhile, wealthy socialite Margaret Wingate is trying to purchase the Falbury Farm to use the land for commercial purposes.

== Production history ==
=== Goodspeed (2023) ===
The musical premiered at the Goodspeed Opera House on July 7, 2023, and closed on August 27, 2023. The show was directed and choreographed by Donna Feore. Orchestrations were done by Doug Besterman.

== Original cast and characters ==
Character	Goodspeed (2023)
Jane Falbury	Danielle Wade
Joe Ross	Corbin Bleu
Gloria Falbury	Arianna Rosario
Orville Wingate	Will Roland
Henry Falbury	Stephen Lee Anderson
Margaret Wingate	Veanne Cox
Montgomery Leach	J. Anthony Crane
Phil Filmore	Gilbert L. Bailey II
TJ	Deshawn Bowens

== Musical numbers ==
Act I

- "Get Happy" - Jane
- "Happy Days Are Here Again" - Company
- "Accentuate The Positive" - Gloria, Joe, Phil
- "I'm Always Chasing Rainbows" - Jane, Joe
- "Always" - Margaret, Orville
- "Always (reprise)" - Jane
- "It's Only a Paper Moon" - Joe
- "The Best Things in Life Are Free" - Henry, Gloria
- "Dig For Your Dinner" - Jane, Joe, Phil
- "Me and My Shadow* - Jane, Gloria
- "Howdy Neighbor, Happy Harvest" - Joe
- "Red Hot Momma" - Margaret, Montgomery
- "Til We Meet Again, You Wonderful You" - Company

Act II

- "June Night" - Henry
- "Some Of These Days" - Jane, Gloria, Margaret, Montgomery
- "Joe's Dance" - Joe
- "I'm Always Chasing Rainbows (reprise)" - Jane
- "It All Depends On You" - Jane, Gloria
- "Always (reprise)" - Margaret
- "Everybody Step" - TJ
- "Lucky Day" - Phil, Orville
- "How Ya Gonna Keep Em Down At The Farm" - Jane
- "Hinky Dinky Parlez Vous" - Jane
- "It Had To Be You" - Joe
- "Get Happy (reprise)" - Jane
- "You Wonderful You (reprise)" - Company
