= The Plant That Ate Dirty Socks =

Children's novel series by Nancy McArthur

- The Plant That Ate Dirty Socks; The Return of the Plant That Ate Dirty Socks; The Escape Of The Plant That Ate Dirty Socks; The Secret Of The Plant That Ate Dirty Socks; More Adventures Of The Plant That Ate Dirty Socks; The Plant That Ate Dirty Socks Goes Up In Space; The Mystery Of The Plant That Ate Dirty Socks; The Plant That Ate Dirty Socks Gets A Girlfriend; The Plant That Ate Dirty Socks Goes Hollywood
- Author: Nancy McArthur
- Country: United States
- Language: English
- Publisher: Avon Camelot/Avon Books
- Published: 1988
- No. of books: 9

The Plant That Ate Dirty Socks is a series of 9 children's novels by Nancy McArthur. The series is centered on two brothers: Michael, a messy child, and Norman, a neat freak, along with their sentient sock-eating pet plants, Stanley and Fluffy.

The eponymous first book in this series, The Plant That Ate Dirty Socks, was published in 1988 and is the most popular book written by McArthur. The book has been taught in the American school system. This often takes place during a unit on plants in the third grade, although the book has been considered a challenging read for some children in that grade. McArthur reworked this book into a play in 2000.

== Titles ==
No.	Title	Author	Publisher	Date	Genre	Length	ISBN
1	The Plant That Ate Dirty Socks	Nancy McArthur	Avon Camelot	1988	Children's novel	128 pp	978-0380754939
2	The Return of the Plant That Ate Dirty Socks	Nancy McArthur	Avon Camelot	1990	Children's novel	136 pp	978-0380758739
3	The Escape of the Plant That Ate Dirty Socks	Nancy McArthur	Avon Camelot	1992	Children's novel	122 pp	978-0380767564
4	The Secret of the Plant That Ate Dirty Socks	Nancy McArthur	Avon Camelot	1993	Children's novel	132 pp	978-0380767571
5	More Adventures Of The Plant That Ate Dirty Socks	Nancy McArthur	Avon Camelot	1994	Children's novel	121 pp	978-0380776634
6	The Plant That Ate Dirty Socks Goes Up In Space	Nancy McArthur	Avon Books	1995	Children's novel	140 pp	978-0380776641
7	The Mystery Of The Plant That Ate Dirty Socks	Nancy McArthur	Avon Books	1996	Children's novel	154 pp	978-0380783182
8	The Plant That Ate Dirty Socks Gets A Girlfriend	Nancy McArthur	Avon Books	1997	Children's novel	130 pp	978-0380783199
9	The Plant That Ate Dirty Socks Goes Hollywood	Nancy McArthur	Avon Books	1999	Children's novel	136 pp	978-0380799350
