= Joe Iconis =

American musical theater writer (born 1981)

- Born: Joseph Peter Iconis; September 22, 1981 (age 45); Garden City, New York, U.S.
- Education: New York University (BM, MFA)
- Occupations: Composer, lyricist, playwright
- Years active: 2003–present
- Spouse: Lauren Marcus (m. 2015)
- Children: 1
- Website: mrjoeiconis.com

Joseph Peter Philip Iconis (born September 22, 1981) is an American composer, lyricist, and playwright. He is best known for writing the music and lyrics to the Broadway musical Be More Chill, for which he was nominated for the Tony Award for Best Original Score at the 2019 Tony Awards.

== Early life and education ==
Iconis graduated from New York University's Steinhardt School of Culture, Education, and Human Development in 2003 with a B.M. in music composition. He then went on to graduate school at NYU's Tisch School of the Arts and in 2005 he received a M.F.A. in musical theater writing.

== Career ==
=== 2006–2013: Early projects ===
The American Theatre Wing awarded Iconis a Jonathan Larson Grant in 2006.

Iconis wrote the music and lyrics for The Black Suits, with a book by Iconis and Robert Maddock. The show was originally written as Iconis and Maddock's thesis at NYU. It is a "rock musical about a Long Island high school garage band." It played SPF at The Public Theater in June 2008. The musical was presented at the Barrington Stage Company's Musical Theatre Lab in Pittsfield, Massachusetts from August 16, 2012, to September 2, 2012. The musical had its world premiere at the Center Theatre Group in Los Angeles, California from October 27, 2013, to November 24, 2013.

Iconis wrote the music, lyrics, and book for The Plant That Ate Dirty Socks, a rock musical based on the book of the same name by Nancy McArthur. Produced by TheaterWorksUSA, it opened Off-Broadway at the Lucille Lortel Theatre in July through August 2008.

Iconis wrote the music, lyrics, and book for ReWrite, trio of interconnected musicals about deadlines: "Nelson Rocks!", "Miss Marzipan", and "The Process". The piece ran at Ars Nova in concert in July 2007, and played Urban Stages from December 2008 through January 2009. The musical had a reading at the Goodspeed Festival of New Musicals in January 2010.

Iconis wrote the music and lyrics for Things To Ruin, rock concert about young people hell bent on destruction and creation. The show was seen in various incarnations at Ars Nova and Joe's Pub (in 2007). The final version premiered at the Zipper Factory Theater (now closed) in November 2008 and January 2009. The show returned to Off-Broadway in May 2009 at the Second Stage Theatre. A cast recording was released in September 2010 from Sh-K-Boom Records. The New Jersey premiere of the theatrical rock concert was on August 6–8, 2015, performed by the Young Adult Drama Group in North Brunswick.

Iconis wrote the music, lyrics, and book for Bloodsong of Love. Directed by John Simpkins, the musical played Off-Broadway at Ars Nova in April to May 2010. In 2010, Bloodsong of Love was nominated for three Drama Desk Awards: Outstanding Featured Actor in a Musical (Jeremy Morse), Outstanding Music (Joe Iconis), and Outstanding Book of a Musical (Joe Iconis). In 2011, it was presented at the National Alliance for Musical Theatre.

In 2013, his song, "Broadway, Here I Come!" was featured several times throughout the second season of the NBC television show Smash.

=== 2015–present: Be More Chill and beyond ===
Based on the novel by Ned Vizzini, Iconis wrote the music and lyrics for Be More Chill, with a book by Joe Tracz. The musical premiered in June 2015 at Two River Theater in Red Bank, New Jersey.

A limited engagement Off-Broadway production starring Will Roland opened July 26, 2018, at the Pershing Square Signature Center and was scheduled to run until September 23, 2018. After selling out, it then received a one week extension and ran until September 30, 2018. The production played on Broadway at the Lyceum Theatre from February 13, 2019, to August 11, 2019. Iconis was nominated for Best Original Score at the 73rd Tony Awards. On August 11, 2019, Be More Chill ended its Broadway run. Afterwards, Iconis gave a speech thanking the people who had "been playing with me for so many years... and people who have been so supportive" and performed "The Goodbye Song". On October 20, 2018, a film adaptation was announced with Greg Berlanti and Shawn Levy as producers.

Iconis wrote the music and lyrics for Broadway Bounty Hunter. The book was written by Iconis, Jason "Sweettooth" Williams, and Lance Rubin. The musical premiered in August 2016 at the Barrington Stage Company, Pittsfield, Massachusetts. It starred Annie Golden as a down-on-her-luck Broadway star. An Off-Broadway version was produced in 2019 at the Greenwich House Theater, with previews starting July 9, 2019. The show played from July 23, 2019, to August 18, 2019. It was announced that a cast album would be released in late 2019. The cast recording's release was delayed and came out on April 24, 2020.

Iconis wrote the book, music, and lyrics for Love in Hate Nation, which made its professional world premiere in 2019 at the Two River Theater in Red Bank, New Jersey after a developmental performance at Penn State University in 2017 as part of their new musicals program. Previews began on November 9, 2019. The show opened on November 15, 2019, and closed on December 1, 2019. It was directed by John Simpkins. Love in Hate Nation is a 1960s-set rock romance between two girls in a juvenile hall. The cast recording of Love in Hate Nation was released on February 11, 2022. It includes B-sides "Jezebel" and an alternate version of "Masochist" by The Smith Twins.

Iconis developed The Untitled Unauthorized Hunter S. Thompson Musical about Hunter S. Thompson for the La Jolla Playhouse with playwright Gregory S. Moss. A second production ran in summer 2025 at Signature Theatre in Arlington, VA, and received positive reviews.

With Rob Rokicki, he developed a jukebox musical called Punk Rock Girl, featuring songs written or made famous by such female musicians or female-fronted bands as Avril Lavigne, Pink, Pat Benatar, and Blondie. The world premiere date for Punk Rock Girl was set for September 10, 2020, at the Argyle Theatre, before being delayed due to the COVID-19 pandemic. Punk Rock Girl officially opened on January 20, 2022 at the Argyle in Babylon Village, New York. The show is named after a song by The Dead Milkmen and contains several references to Iconis' previous works. Iconis often jokes with the press that jukebox musicals are putting him out of business, but he agreed to create one because he saw the potential to create characters that high school students would relate to. He wrote one original composition for the musical called "Music and Math".

A record made up of 44 original songs by Iconis, called Album, debuted on June 17, 2022, released by Ghostlight Records. Over the course of his career, Iconis has written hundreds of songs, many unproduced and unattached to full musicals, and found selecting only 44 to be challenging. To complement the album, Iconis and frequent collaborator Jennifer Ashley Tepper discuss each song on their weekly podcast ALBUM PODCAST. In October 2022, Iconis released 10 tracks from Album as a Halloween compilation titled A(aaagh!)lbum.

== Personal life ==
Iconis married musical theater actress Lauren Marcus in 2015. They frequently work together, including on shows ReWrite, Be More Chill, Love In Hate Nation, and Punk Rock Girl, and live concerts. In April 2024, Marcus gave birth to their first child.

Iconis is a concert performer, often performing with his musical theater family, referred to as Iconis and Family, at various New York City concert venues, such as The Laurie Beechman Theater, Joe's Pub, and 54 Below.

== Works ==
=== Theatre ===
Unless otherwise marked, book, music, and lyrics by Iconis.

- Things To Ruin (2007), music and lyrics by Iconis
- ReWrite (2007)
- The Black Suits (2008)
- The Plant That Ate Dirty Socks (2008)
- Bloodsong of Love: The Rock'N'Roll Spaghetti Western (2010)
- Be More Chill (2015), music and lyrics by Iconis
- Broadway Bounty Hunter (2019)
- Love in Hate Nation (2019)
- Punk Rock Girl (2022), book by Iconis
- The Untitled Unauthorized Hunter S. Thompson Musical (2023)

=== Music ===
- Things To Ruin: The Songs Of Joe Iconis (Original Cast Recording) (2010)
- I'm Ready: The Songs of Rob Rokicki (2012) – Song: "Footprints" (written and performed by Rob Rokicki and Iconis; also appears on Monstersongs (2017))
- The Joe Iconis Rock & Roll Jamboree (2013)
- Be More Chill (Original Cast Recording) (2015)
- Two Player Game (2018)
- Be More Chill (Original Broadway Cast Recording) (2019)
- Broadway Bounty Hunter (Original Cast Recording) (2020)
- Love in Hate Nation (Original Cast Recording) (2022)
- Album (2022)
- A(aaagh!)lbum (2022) (compilation of Halloween-themed songs from Album)

== Awards ==
- Jonathan Larson Award (2006)
- Daryl Roth Award (2006) for Plastic! The Musical with Robert Maddock
- Ed Kleban Award (2007)
- Backstage Bistro Award (2007) for Triumphant Baby! with Robert Maddock
- Nightlife Award (2007) for Triumphant Baby! with Robert Maddock
- ASCAP Foundation Richard Rodgers New Horizons Award for best new composer on Broadway (2008)
- MAC/ASCAP John Wallowitch Award (2010)
