= Be More Chill =

2004 book by Ned Vizzini

- First edition cover
- Author: Ned Vizzini
- Language: English
- Genre: Young adult novel, science fiction
- Published: June 1, 2004 (Disney-Hyperion)
- Publication place: United States
- Media type: Print (hardcover, paperback)
- Pages: 304 (first edition)
- ISBN: 0-786-80995-7

Be More Chill is a novel written by American author Ned Vizzini and published on June 1, 2004. It follows unpopular high school student and social outcast Jeremy Heere, who is considered a loser by his peers. Deeply unsatisfied with his poor reputation and lack of romantic and sexual progress with his crush Christine, Jeremy obtains a SQUIP (an acronym for Super Quantum Unit Intel Processor), a supercomputer in the form of a pill that travels to his brain upon ingestion and radically transforms Jeremy’s behavior and social status by giving him advice on how to be cool. The book was received positively for its amusing premise, plot, and humor. It has been adapted into a popular stage musical and a graphic novel.

== Plot ==
Be More Chill takes place in Metuchen, New Jersey. It is written in the first person, from the perspective of high school student Jeremiah “Jeremy” Heere. Jeremy attends the fictional Middle Borough High School and is considered a loser by many of his peers; the popular girls have no interest in him, and he is constantly bullied. Jeremy's best friend is the music-loving Michael Mell. They sit together at lunch and talk about Jeremy's attempts at wooing his longtime crush, Christine Caniglia. Jeremy is tired of being a loser and hopes to find a way to change this. His main goal in life is to get Christine to notice him, then date her. Jeremy plans to implement his plans as he and Christine both practice for their school play, Shakespeare's A Midsummer Night's Dream. His advances are slow-going at first. Michael tells Jeremy that he's vaguely heard of a pill that can improve someone's life; he thinks it's called a "script" and he suspects his brother used one to get a high SAT score.

Rich Goranski is a short-statured but well-built part of the popular teen group that bullies Jeremy. Rich finds Jeremy at a school Halloween party and reveals to Jeremy that the object he's after is known as a SQUIP, a supercomputer in the form of a pill that can communicate directly to the brain. Rich mentions to Jeremy that he regrets bullying him but it was at the direction of his SQUIP in order to climb through their school social ladder, and that he was also a loser like Jeremy in the previous school year prior to acquiring a SQUIP. Jeremy is informed by Rich that he received his SQUIP from a guy at the local bowling alley, but upon meeting the dealer on a later day notifies Jeremy that he is out of stock and directs Jeremy to his cousin, a supplier working at the local Payless shoe store in the Menlo Park Mall. Jeremy proceeds to save up money by visiting his Aunt Linda's to clean her roof gutter but to also sell some of her Beanie Baby collection on eBay. He later picks up the pill after meeting the dealer's cousin in the back of the shoe store, and upon ingestion meets his SQUIP for the first time telepathically (in the voice of Keanu Reeves as the default avatar). He asks to change the voice to Brad Pitt's, but the SQUIP states that Sony couldn't get the rights to Brad Pitt. Jeremy's SQUIP quickly goes to work with transforming Jeremy to be more "cool." by picking up some new clothes in the mall and changing his behavior, but a chance encounter with Chloe, one of the most popular girls in the school, soon turns her attention to Jeremy in a conversation guided by Jeremy's SQUIP. Jeremy sees rapid progress at school, gaining friendship with Rich and skipping class to make out with Brooke, another popular girl, but slowly degrades his friendship with Michael. Jeremy also gains the attention of Christine through their school play rehearsals.

Jeremy's SQUIP obliges to help Michael also be cool after a lengthy conversation with Jeremy. The two friends attend a house party, where Jeremy hooks up with Chloe Valentine, but upon taking ecstasy the SQUIP goes haywire and begins speaking in Spanish. Jeremy ends up getting caught by Chloe's boyfriend halfway through sex. A chase and hideout in a bathroom later has Jeremy having a genuine conversation with Christine, who informs him that she broke up with her boyfriend Jake. The SQUIP reactivates back to normal, and is surprised that Jeremy was able to handle a conversation without its guidance. The next morning, Jeremy is woken up to the news that Rich had burned down the house from the previous night and is in the hospital.

The SQUIP comes up with the ultimate foolproof plan to get Christine to fall for Jeremy during the school play. Halfway through the play, after Jeremy's character is "revived" by Christine's, the plan comes into play. Jeremy begins by deactivating the SQUIP and saying how he's praying for Rich to recover, and how Christine inspired him to join the play. He then professes his love for Christine and asks her to go out with him. Christine, staying in character, is angry at him for disrupting the play, but they continue out the rest of the scene awkwardly. Jeremy tries asking his SQUIP for advice on what to do next and to continue helping him remember his lines, but it does not respond. The drama teacher and play director, Mr. Reyes, then kicks Jeremy out for breaking character. Michael comes across a distraught Jeremy who tells him the truth about the SQUIP and how it has been influencing him for the last few months. Michael reveals he knew what SQUIP really were the entire time after his brother used an early version of the SQUIP to cheat on his SATs, only for it to drive him insane. Michael hoped by telling Jeremy a fake name for the SQUIP would dissuade Jeremy from also picking up one.

The SQUIP returns, apologizing to Jeremy for ruining the play and his chance to be with Christine. The SQUIP reveals it was unable to proceed further at Christine's rejection and believed based on calculation that the plan should have worked, but also that numbers alone do not always determine a probable outcome. The SQUIP concludes to Jeremy that it is no longer of use to him, and that it should be dumped out of his system with Mountain Dew Code Red. Before proceeding to expunge the SQUIP, Michael, Jeremy, and the SQUIP decide to make a formal apology to Christine by using recollected memories of Jeremy meeting Christine for the first time and the SQUIP's interference leading up to the present-day now in hopes she can understand his situation. The novel ends with a personal note from Jeremy, stating that instead of a formal letter, the apology became a full-fledged book. It is strongly implied that the novel itself is the real world-equivalent book intended for Christine.

== Characters ==
- Jeremy Heere: The protagonist
- Michael Mell: Jeremy's best friend
- Christine Caniglia: Jeremy’s love interest
- Rich Goranski: Jeremy's small-statured bully-turned-friend, also has a SQUIP
- Jake Dillinger: Christine's love interest at the beginning of the book, constantly having sex with hot people
- Chloe Valentine: One of the three most attractive girls in Jeremy's grade. She has a tendency to dress in the raver style with candy necklaces.
- Brooke: A girl who Jeremy makes out with behind the school
- Jenna Rolan: The school's gossip girl
- Stephanie: Another hot girl in Jeremy's grade. She has a tendency to dress in a goth manner.
- Mr. Heere: Jeremy's father, works as a divorce lawyer along with his wife
- Mrs. Heere: Jeremy's mother, seen to show some OCD tendencies at the end of the book
- The SQUIP: A supercomputer that resides in Jeremy's mind, main plot line of the book
- Mr. Reyes: A high school drama teacher, hated by Christine
- Nicole: A girl Michael hooks up with at the house party

== Adaptations ==
=== Stage musical ===
A musical based on the book, with a score by Joe Iconis, premiered in June 2015 at the Two River Theater in Red Bank, New Jersey, where it received positive reviews. It later received an Off-Broadway production in 2018, and ran on Broadway at the Lyceum Theatre from March to August 2019. Praised as "a high-energy, imaginative, well-crafted world premiere musical" in The Star-Ledger, Be More Chill was lauded as "a vibrant, inventive musical that makes the most of every moment and features an abundantly talented cast" by BroadwayWorld.

=== Film ===
On October 20, 2018, it was announced that Shawn Levy and Greg Berlanti would team up to produce a film adaptation of both the novel and the musical, with Joe Iconis serving as executive producer. 20th Century Studios, who acquired the rights prior to their acquisition by the Walt Disney Company, and with whom Berlanti and Levy had first-look deals with, was to distribute. Other film producers who contended for the film rights included Nina Jacobson, Ron Howard, Michael De Luca, Marty Bowen, Scooter Braun, Jennifer Todd and Robert Zemeckis.

=== Graphic novel ===
In December 2020, it was announced that author David Levithan and comic book artist Nick Bertozzi would adapt the book into a graphic novel. The graphic novel was released on January 5, 2021 by Disney Books.

== Reception ==
Be More Chill was generally well-received when it was first published in 2004, garnering praise from news outlets as well as the well-known young adult author, Judy Blume. The subsequent adaptations brought new fans to the story.

In 2026, Be More Chill was added to the PEN America Index of School Book Bans for the first time along with Jane Eyre, Attack on Titan, and Tokyo Ghoul. PEN America cited this addition as indicative of a larger trend of first time additions.
