= One Penny (film) =

- Release poster
- Directed by: Michael DeVita
- Written by: David A. Melendez; Michael DeVita
- Produced by: David A. Melendez
- Starring: Harrison Samuels; Carson Grant; Ben Rezendes; Will Roland; Erin O'Brien
- Music by: Danny Gray
- Production company: StonePark Productions
- Distributed by: StonePark Productions
- Release date: February 16, 2017 (DC Independent Film Festival)
- Running time: 90 min.
- Country: United States
- Language: English
- Budget: $200,000 (estimated)

One Penny is a 2017 United States low budget drama film directed by Michael DeVita and produced by David A. Melendez. It tells the story of a young boy abandoned after the murder of his mother who is taken in by a homeless man known as the "Professor".

The film was shot on location around the Washington, D.C., and Baltimore areas and premiered at the DC Independent Film Festival in February 2017.

== Cast ==
- Harrison Samuels – Dylan
- Carson Grant – Professor
- Ben Rezendes – Tristan
- Will Roland – Collin
- Erin O'Brien – Jordan

== Critical reception ==
In her review of One Penny for Film International, Elias Savada considered that: " ... The cast all offer well-crafted performances, particularly Harrison Samuels as Dylan ... Devita and Melendez have shown a great deal of creativity in this freshman study of homeless life in the streets."
