= Figure skating in the United States =

Sport history and governance in the U.S.

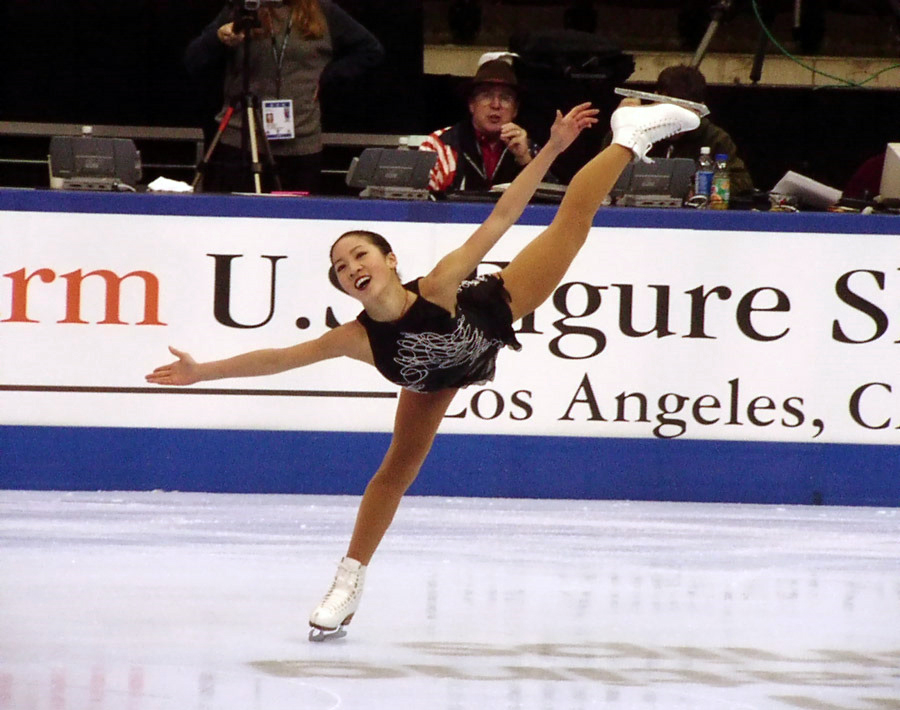
- American Michelle Kwan performing a spiral at the practice for the 2002 United States National Championships.
- Governing body: U.S. Figure Skating

National competitions
- U.S. Figure Skating Championships

International competitions
- Winter Olympics; World Figure Skating Championships

Figure skating is a sport in which individuals, pairs, or groups perform on figure skates on ice. Although ice skating began in 3,000 BCE in Scandinavia, American Edward Bushnell's 1855 invention of steel blades and Jackson Haines bringing elements of ballet to figure skating were critical to the development of modern-day figure skating. Since then, figure skating in the United States has grown to have 186,038 members as of the 2020–2021 season.

== Overview ==
The governing body of figure skating in the United States is US Figure Skating,"U.S. Figure Skating is a member of the International Skating Union (ISU), the international federation for figure skating; and the United States Olympic & Paralympic Committee (USOPC)." U.S. figure skating, along with USA Hockey, endorses Learn to Skate USA, which provides lessons in the basics of skating, including for ice hockey, speed skating, multiple disciplines of figure skating, along with adaptive skating for skaters with disabilities. U.S. Figure Skating also contains a series of levels and testing for skaters beyond Learn to Skate USA. In addition, U.S. Figure Skating also governs collegiate skating, including intercollegiate competitions, collegiate championships, and collegiate synchronized skating. The membership demographics of U.S. Figure Skating are 69% female and 27% male. In addition, Ice Sports Industry "an international industry trade association" hosts competitions, runs learn to skate programs, and offers an alternate set of levels to US Figure Skating.

Ice skating used to be a popular television sport in the United States but has fallen out of favor since the 1970s, and the number of medals they have won at the winter Olympics has declined. This may be a result of the 2008 financial crisis, as figure skating has always been an expensive sport, as well as due to the retirement of Michelle Kwan and decline in the international success of the United States with the growing success of the vastly different Russian program.

== History ==
During the 1860s, Jackson Haines created and popularized figure skating in the United States.

In 1914, the first U.S. Figure Skating Championships were held.

In 1928, Maribel Vinson set the record for most U.S. national championship titles at 9. Michelle Kwan has since tied this record.

At the 1948 Olympics, 14-year-old American Dick Button became the first person to land a double axel in competition, having only landed it for the first time days earlier. He then became the first to land a triple jump in competition at the Oslo 1952 Olympic Winter Games.

In 1953, 15-year-old Tenley Albright became the first American woman to win a world championship title. In 1956, she became the first American woman to win an Olympic gold medal.

In 1956, synchronized skating was founded in Ann Arbor Michigan by Dr. Richard J. Porter. His team, the Hockettes began skating in between the periods at University of Michigan hockey games.

In 1961, the United States national team was headed to the World Championships in Czechoslovakia when their flight, Sabena Flight 548 crashed, killing the entire world team.

In 1976, Dorothy Hamill became the last female skater to win Olympic gold without including a triple jump.

In 1984, the first United States Synchronized Skating Championships was held.

In July 1990, the ISU stopped including figures as part of competitions, impacting American and International competitions.

In 1992, Kristin Yamaguchi became the first Asian American woman to win an Olympic gold medal in figure skating, and in 1998, she became the first Asian American to be inducted into the World Figure Skating Hall of Fame.

The 1994 Cobo Arena attack on Nancy Kerrigan increased nationwide interest in figure skating. The controversy itself sparked public interest, as did the quality of women's skating at the time, and figure skating was very popular in the 1990s. Tonya Harding, whose ex-husband was charged with orchestrating the attack on Kerrigan, was the first American woman to land a triple axel in competition. The eventual Olympic competition between Kerrigan and Harding set ratings records. Harding was eventually implicated in the attack, and forced to renounce her membership in U.S. Figure Skating and was barred from the organization.

In 1996 Tara Lipinski became the youngest person to win the world championship, and in 1998, she became "the youngest winner of an individual event in the history of the Winter Games".

From 1996 to 2005, Michelle Kwan won the U.S. national championships 9 times and won the World Championships 5 times. Although she never won Olympic gold, she did win a silver in 1998 and bronze medal in 2002. She is the most decorated American woman in figure skating.

Beginning in 2004 and fully implemented by 2006, the ISU implemented the ISU Judging system, a new code of points replacing the old 6.0 system and used in both American and international competition.

In 2018, Mirai Nagasu became first ever U.S. woman to land the triple axel in Olympic competition.

In 2019, then 13 year-old Alysa Liu became the youngest U.S. women's figure skating champion.

As of the 2020 U.S. synchronized skating championships, synchronized skating team the Haydenettes have won a total of 28 US national titles, and have won the last 11 US championships at the senior level.

Medal	Name(s)	Event	Year
Bronze	Theresa Weld	Singles	1920
Silver	Beatrix Loughran	Singles	1924
Bronze	Beatrix Loughran	Singles	1928
Silver	Beatrix Loughran and Sherwin Badger	Pairs	1932
Bronze	Maribel Vinson	Singles	1932
Gold	Dick Button	Singles	1948
Bronze	Colleen O'Connor and James Millns	Ice Dance	1951
Gold	Dick Button	Singles	1952
Silver	Tenley Albright	Singles	1952
Silver	Karol Kennedy and Peter Kennedy	Pairs	1952
Bronze	James Grogan	Singles	1952
Gold	Tenley Albright	Singles	1956
Silver	Carol Heiss	Singles	1956
Gold	Hayes Allen Jenkins	Singles	1956
Silver	Ronnie Robertson	Singles	1956
Bronze	David Jenkins	Singles	1956
Gold	Carol Heiss	Singles	1960
Bronze	Barbra Roles	Singles	1960
Gold	David Jenkins	Singles	1960
Bronze	Nancy Ludington and Ronald Ludington	Pairs	1960
Bronze	Vivian Joseph and Ronald Joseph	Pairs	1964
Bronze	Scott Allen	Singles	1964
Gold	Peggy Fleming	Singles	1968
Silver	Timothy Wood	Singles	1968
Bronze	Janet Lynn	Singles	1972
Gold	Dorothy Hamill	Singles	1976
Silver	Linda Fratianne	Singles	1980
Bronze	Charles Tickner	Singles	1980
Gold	Scott Hamilton	Singles	1984
Silver	Rosalynn Sumners	Singles	1984
Silver	Kitty Carruthers and Peter Carruthers	Pairs	1984
Bronze	Debi Thomas	Singles	1988
Gold	Brian Boitano	Singles	1998
Bronze	Jill Watson and Peter Oppegard	Pairs	1988
Gold	Kristi Yamaguchi	Singles	1992
Bronze	Nancy Kerrigan	Singles	1992
Silver	Nancy Kerrigan	Singles	1994
Silver	Paul Wiley	Singles	1992
Gold	Tara Lipinski	Singles	1998
Silver	Michelle Kwan	Singles	1998
Gold	Sarah Hughes	Singles	2002
Bronze	Michelle Kwan	Singles	2002
Bronze	Timothy Gobel	Singles	2002
Silver	Sasha Cohen	Singles	2006
Silver	Tanith Belbin and Ben Agosto	Ice Dance	2006
Gold	Evan Lysacek	Singles	2010
Silver	Meryl Davis and Charlie White	Ice Dance	2010
Gold	Meryl Davis and Charlie White	Ice Dance	2014
Bronze	Jeremy Abbot, Jason Brown, Ashley Wagner, Gracie Gold, Marissa Castelli and Simon Shnapir, Meryl Davis and Charlie White	Team	2014
Bronze	Maia Shibutani and Alex Shibutani	Ice Dance	2018
Bronze	Maia Shibutani and Alex Shibutani, Adam Rippon, Alexa Knierim and Chris Knierim, Mirai Nagasu, Bradie Tennell, Nathan Chen	Team	2018
Gold	Nathan Chen	Singles	2022
Gold	Nathan Chen, Vincent Zhou, Karen Chen, Alexa Knierim and Chris Knierim, Madison Chock and Evan Bates, Madison Hubbell and Zachary Donohue	Team	2022

== Current senior team representing the United States ==
Currently, the team of senior skaters representing the United States consists of Starr Andrews, Maxine Marie Bautista, Mariah Bell, Amber Glenn, Karen Chen, Gabriella Izzo, Alysa Liu, Sierra Venetta, Bradie Tennell, Audrey Shin and Paige Rydberg in the ladies category, Jason Brown, Nathan Chen, Tomoki Hiwatashi, Jimmy Ma, Maxim Naumov, Yaroslav Paniot, Camden Pulkinen, Andrew Torgashev, Dinh Tran and Vincent Zhou in the men's category, Valentina Plazas and Maximiliano Fernandez, Katie McBeath and Nathan Bartholomay, Audrey Lu and Misha Mitrofanov, Chelsea Liu and Danny O'Shea, Alexa Knierim and Brandon Frazier, Emily Chan and Spencer Howe, Jessica Calalang and Brian Johnson, and Ashley Cain-Gribble and Timothy LeDuc in pairs, and Caroline Green and Michael Parsons, Kaitlin Hawayek and Jean-Luc Baker, Madison Hubbell and Zachary Donohue, Lorraine McNamara and Anton Spiridonov, and Eva Pate and Logan Bye in ice dance. This includes skaters "includes athletes in the A, B and C team envelope, as well as athletes with international assignments". The current senior level synchronized skating teams are The Haydenettes, The Skyliners, Miami University, Adrian College, and the Crystallettes.
