= Nancy McArthur =

American author (1931–2020)

- Born: October 30, 1931
- Died: July 15, 2020 (aged 88) Olmsted Falls, Ohio
- Occupation: Author; journal editor; professor
- Period: 1988–2000
- Genre: Children's literature

Nancy McArthur (October 30, 1931 – July 15, 2020) was an American children's author. Living in Berea, Ohio, she was a part-time journalism professor at Baldwin-Wallace College. She wrote fourteen books, nine of which form a series called The Plant That Ate Dirty Socks. The series follows the lives of two young brothers, Michael and Norman, along with their sentient pet plants, Stanley and Fluffy. The first book in this series is the most popular book written by McArthur. She reworked this book into a play in 2000. She died on July 15, 2020, from Parkinson's disease.

== Works ==
- Megan Gets a Dollhouse (1988)
- Pickled Peppers (1988)
- The Plant That Ate Dirty Socks (1988)
- The Adventure of the Buried Treasure (1990)
- The Return of the Plant That Ate Dirty Socks (1990)
- The Adventure of the Backyard Sleepout (1992)
- The Escape Of The Plant That Ate Dirty Socks (1992)
- The Secret Of The Plant That Ate Dirty Socks (1993)
- More Adventures Of The Plant That Ate Dirty Socks (1994)
- The Plant That Ate Dirty Socks Goes Up In Space (1995)
- The Mystery Of The Plant That Ate Dirty Socks (1996)
- The Plant That Ate Dirty Socks Gets A Girlfriend (1997)
- The Adventure of the Big Snow (1998)
- The Plant That Ate Dirty Socks Goes Hollywood (1999)
