= Barrington Stage Company =

Non-profit theatre company in Pittsfield, Massachusetts, U.S.

Coordinates: 42.4570°N 73.2538°W

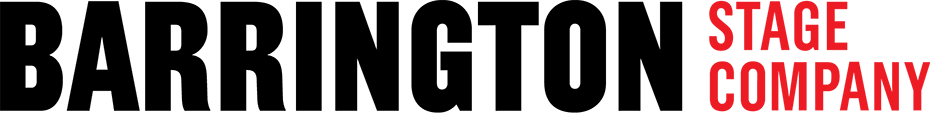

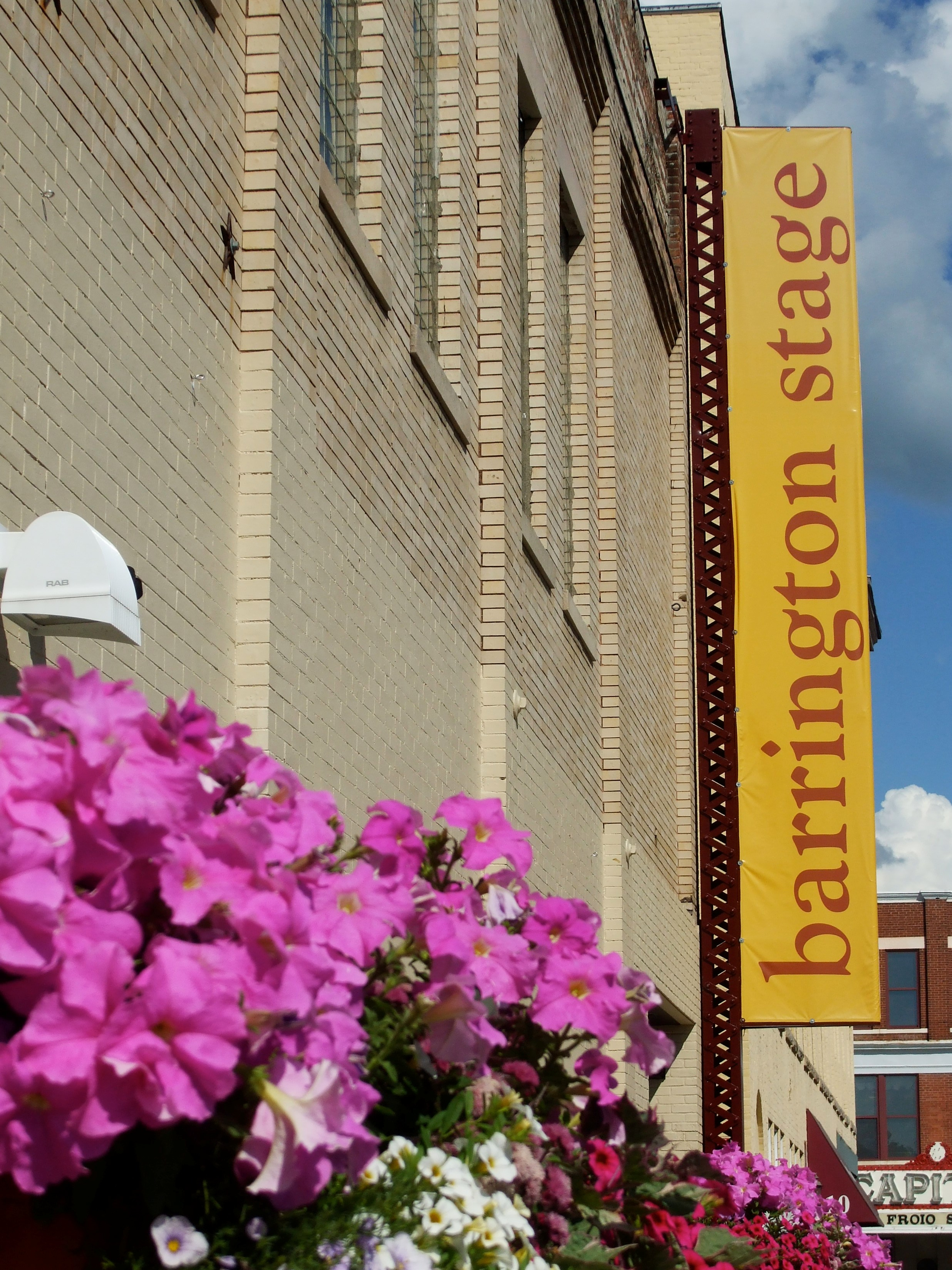
- Formation: 1995
- Type: Theatre group
- Location: Pittsfield, Massachusetts
- Website: barringtonstageco.org

Barrington Stage Company (BSC) is a regional theater company in the Berkshires of Western Massachusetts. It was co-founded in 1995 by Artistic Director Julianne Boyd, and former Managing Director Susan Sperber in Sheffield, Massachusetts. As of 2026, the organization is led by Artistic Director Alan Paul and Executive Director Greg Reiner.

In 2004, BSC developed, workshopped, and premiered the hit musical The 25th Annual Putnam County Spelling Bee. Following the successful Broadway run, which nabbed two Tony Awards for Best Book and Best Featured Actor, BSC made the move to a more permanent home in Pittsfield, Massachusetts.

The company which was previously housed in the Consolati Performing Arts Center at Mount Everett High School in Sheffield, Massachusetts, purchased and renovated the Berkshire Music Hall in downtown in 2005. The venue was renamed the Boyd-Quinson Mainstage after its renovation. The 520-seat Mainstage Theatre is now located at 30 Union Street. In 2012 the company purchased an old VFW building on Linden Street in Pittsfield, turning it into the Sydelle and Lee Blatt Performing Arts Center . The Blatt Center includes the St. Germain Stage (formerly known as Stage 2) and a 99-seat space dubbed Mr. Finn's Cabaret. Additionally, the company acquired the Wolfson Theater Center which serves as the company's administrative offices and a rehearsal space in the center of Pittsfield today. BSC's scenic departments operate out of a 22,100 square-foot facility, located at 34 Laurel Street, referred to as the Production Center (PC). The PC was purchased in 2019 in order to more conveniently construct and pre-assemble scenic elements before being loaded into BSC's performance spaces. Before purchasing the PC, BSC operated out of a warehouse at Fenn and Fourth streets in order to construct their sets.

== The Mainstage Theatre ==
Originally named the Union Square Theatre, built in 1912, the Mainstage Theatre hosted vaudeville acts, stage shows, and eventually, silent pictures. In 1983, the venue became known as the Berkshire Public Theatre, which produced plays until 1994. In 1994 the space changed hands once again and became the Berkshire Music Hall. When Barrington Stage Company purchased the building in 2005, the venue underwent a full renovation and became a 520-seat theater, opening its doors in the summer of 2006, under the name The Boyd-Quinson Mainstage.

== Notables ==
=== Productions ===
BSC won the Elliot Norton/Boston Theatre Critics Award in its inaugural year for The Diary of Anne Frank. In its third year it won two Elliot Norton/Boston Theatre Critics Awards and four Outer Critics Awards for its production of Cabaret, which transferred to Boston for an extended run at the Hasty Pudding Theatre.

Mark St. Germain's Freud's Last Session, starring Mark H. Dold and Martin Rayner, became BSC's longest-running show, playing 61 performances over two summers and multiple extensions, prior to its two-year Off Broadway run.

St. Germain's one-woman play Dr. Ruth All the Way set in 1997, starring Debra Jo Rupp, played to sold out houses at BSC before it moved Off Broadway, renamed Becoming Dr. Ruth. It opened Off Broadway at the Westside Theatre. The play showcased the sex therapist's life from fleeing the Nazis in the Kindertransport and joining the Haganah in Jerusalem as a scout and sniper, to her struggles to succeed as a single mother coming to America.

Other critically acclaimed productions at BSC include:

- Follies, starring Donna McKechnie, Kim Crosby, Leslie Denniston, Jeff McCarthy and Lara Teeter (2005)
- On the Town, starring Tony Yazbeck, Jay Armstrong Johnson, Clyde Alves, Elizabeth Stanley and Alysha Umphress (2013), moved to Broadway in 2014
- Breaking the Code, starring Mark H. Dold (2014)
- the world premiere of Dancing Lessons, starring John Cariani and Paige Davis (2014)
- the world premiere of American Son, starring Tamara Tunie and Michael Hayden (2016), moved to Broadway in 2018
- Pirates of Penzance starring Will Swenson, Scarlett Strallen, Kyle Dean Massey and David Garrison (2016)
- Company starring Aaron Tveit (2017)
- West Side Story, starring Tyler Hanes, Sean Ewing, Will Branner, Addie Morales and Skyler Volpe (2018)

=== Associated artists ===
Actors

- Gretchen Egolf
- Jeff McCarthy
- Susan Louise O'Connor
- Debra Jo Rupp
- Elizabeth Stanley

Directors

- John Rando

Designers

- David Lander

Choreographers

- Joshua Bergasse

Playwrights and lyricists

- William Finn
- Joe Iconis
- Mark St. Germain

Composers

- Jason Robert Brown

== Dedication to new works ==
In addition to The 25th Annual Putnam County Spelling Bee, many other new works have seen their world premieres at BSC. As of 2020, BSC had produced 36 pieces of new work, including 19 of which that moved to New York stages in some capacity.

Mark St. Germain's Ears on a Beatle, The God Committee, and Freud's Last Session, are all plays that were initially produced at BSC, which transferred to New York for Off-Broadway runs.

In 2003, BSC produced The Game, a musical based on the novel Les Liaisons dangereuses. In 2016, Barrington Stage Company premiered Christopher Demos-Brown's American Son which later transferred to Broadway and became a Netflix film.

=== The Burman New Play Award ===
In 2018 the Burman New Play Award was established. The award is given to emerging playwrights for unproduced full-length works. Past Grand Prize winners include Stacey Rose’s America v. 2.1: The Sad Demise & Eventual Extinction of the American Negro, and Daniella De Jesus's Get Your Pink Hands off Me Sucka and Give Me Back.

=== Musical Theatre Lab ===
Created in 2006 by Artistic Director Julianne Boyd and Tony Award winner composer William Finn, the Musical Theatre Lab (MTL) is a place for young musical theatre writers to develop their work from an early reading to full productions. As of 2020, it had produced six workshops and 11 world premiere musicals.

Many of the new musicals have gone on to a life after Barrington Stage. The Burnt Part Boys ( Chris Miller and Nathan Tyson) was produced at Playwrights Horizons, and Funked Up Fairy Tales (Krisitn Childs) continued to be developed at the Sundance Institute. Calvin Berger (Barry Wyner) was produced at George Street Playhouse, and See Rock City or Other Destinations (Brad Alexander and Adam Mathias) and The Memory Show (Zach Redler and Sara Cooper) were later produced by The Transport Group. Southern Comfort (Dan Collins and Julianne Wick Davis) moved to the Public Theatre. Additionally, Robert Maddock and Joe Iconis's The Black Suits received a workshop production in 2012 before its world premiere at Center Theatre Group. And Iconis worked with Barrington Stage Company on a new musical once again in 2016 on Broadway Bounty Hunter, written by Joe Iconis, Lance Rubin, and Jason Williams, which was later produced Off-Broadway.

=== Youth Theatre ===
Barrington Stage's Youth Theatre program serves local teens, allowing them to work with professionals to mount a production. In 2019, the company produced Ragtag Theatre Company's world premiere musical Hansel and Gretel, and following a program shutdown 2020–2021 for COVID-19, continued to produce new work with The SupaDupa Kid, a devised play based on the book of the same title by local novelist Ty Allan Jackson.
