= Two River Theater =

Regional theater company in Red Bank, New Jersey

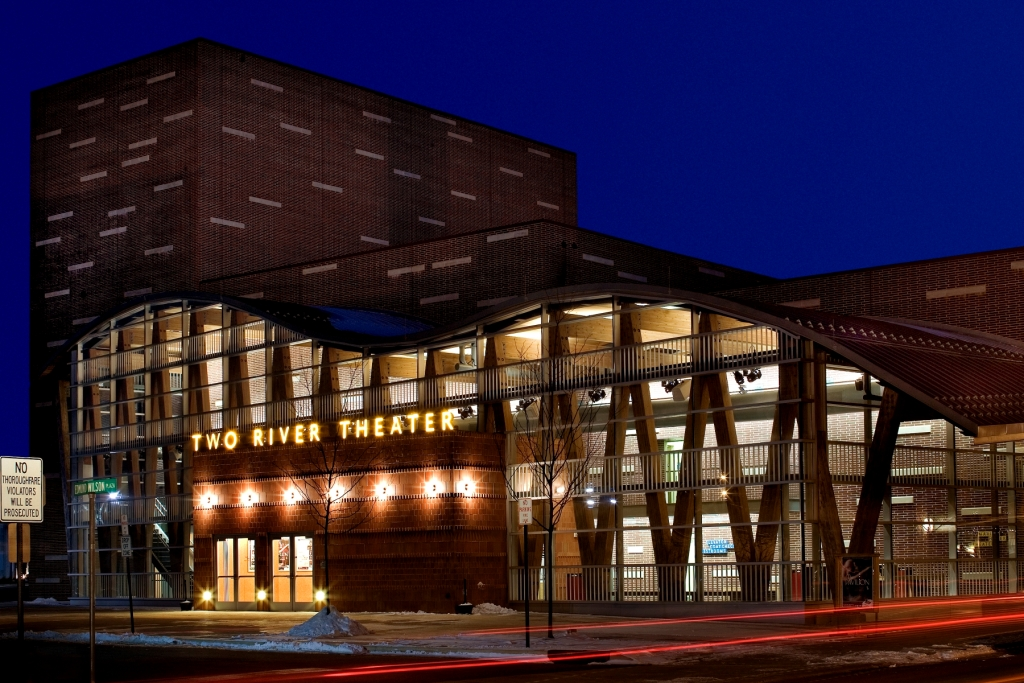
- Two River Theater entrance, October 2009
- Interactive map of Two River Theater
- Location: 21 Bridge Avenue, Red Bank, New Jersey 07701
- Coordinates: 40.3495°N 74.0748°W

Website
- tworivertheater.org/

Two River Theater is a professional, not-for-profit, regional theater company producing plays and educational programs for audiences from central New Jersey and beyond. It is located in Red Bank, New Jersey, on the peninsula between the Navesink and Shrewsbury Rivers that gave the theater its name. Two River Theater produces a multi-play subscription season. Two River Theater strives to be accessible to all, as they have accessibility services to help accommodate viewers. Some services that they have occasionally offered are free onsite childcare, audio described performances, open captioned performances, American Sign Language interpreted performances, sensory inclusive performances, and fragrance-free performances.

The company received "Theatre of the Year" awards from the New Jersey Theatre Alliance in 2006, and from The Star-Ledger in both 2006 and 2008. At the July 2009 meeting of the New Jersey State Council on the Arts, Two River Theater was designated as a Major Impact Organization. Two River Theater is a member of LORT (League of Resident Theatres), Theatre Communications Group and the New Jersey Theatre Alliance.

== History ==
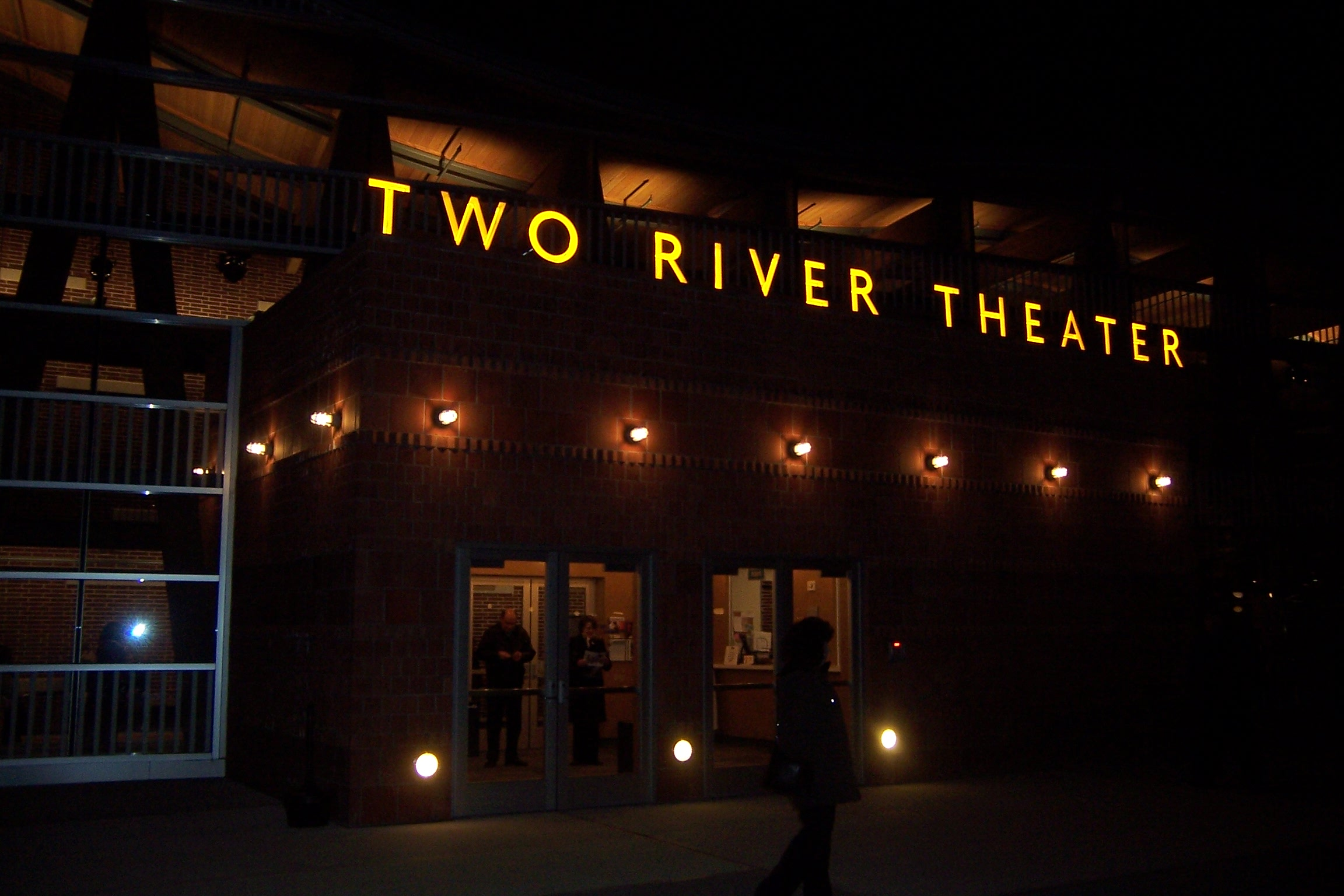
Theater entrance, December 2006

Two River Theater was founded by Joan and Robert Rechnitz in 1994. The company's first three seasons occurred at Monmouth University. Then it moved to Manasquan and finally built a theater for itself in Red Bank in 2005.

Currently under the leadership of Artistic Director John Dias and Managing Director Michael Hurst, Two River Theater develops and produces American theater. Each year, more than 55,000 patrons and guests come through the doors to see productions in two performance spaces, the Joan and Robert Rechnitz Theater and the Marion Huber Theater.

== Programing ==
Crossing Borders is an annual five-day festival of new plays by Latino writers and free community events. It was begun in 2011. Nosotros is a program that fosters a closer relationship between theater and Latino artists and audiences. Another annual program is a Cabaret of New Songs for the Musical Theater.

Two River Theater's new-play commissioning program, launched in 2010, commissions two plays a year and has produced more than five of these works. Each season, the theater hosts numerous artist residencies, workshops, and readings to support the development of new work for the American theater, including separate week-long retreats with Clubbed Thumb and NYU's Graduate Musical Theater Writing program.

In 2020 Two River began a partnership with National Asian American Theater to foster the inclusion of more Asian American Artists in theater across the country.

=== Education programs ===
Two River offers theater arts programs to students from 1st through 12th grade. Student matinees serve students in 50 schools throughout New Jersey. Classroom residencies support academic achievement and allow students to engage with theater artists. Multiple programs also introduce at-risk adolescents to theater.

"A Little Shakespeare" series, launched during Two River's 20th Anniversary Season, is an educational program that produces an annual production of a Shakespeare play performed by high-school students.

The Metro Scholar program offers high school juniors the opportunity to explore professional theater and play a role in the life of Two River Theater.

PlayBack is a program in which selected high school students work with Two River Teaching Artists who guide them in the creation and performance of their own original play inspired by, in response to, and in conversation with a production on the theater's main stage.

Summer Ensembles is a three-week summer program offered to students from first to twelfth grade. Teaching artists channel students’ natural energy and vitality into creative thinking, teamwork, and performance skills through theater games, songs and devising original material. Students get the opportunity to perform for their peers, and to see the inner-workings backstage with the Two River production staff.

== Theater Complex ==
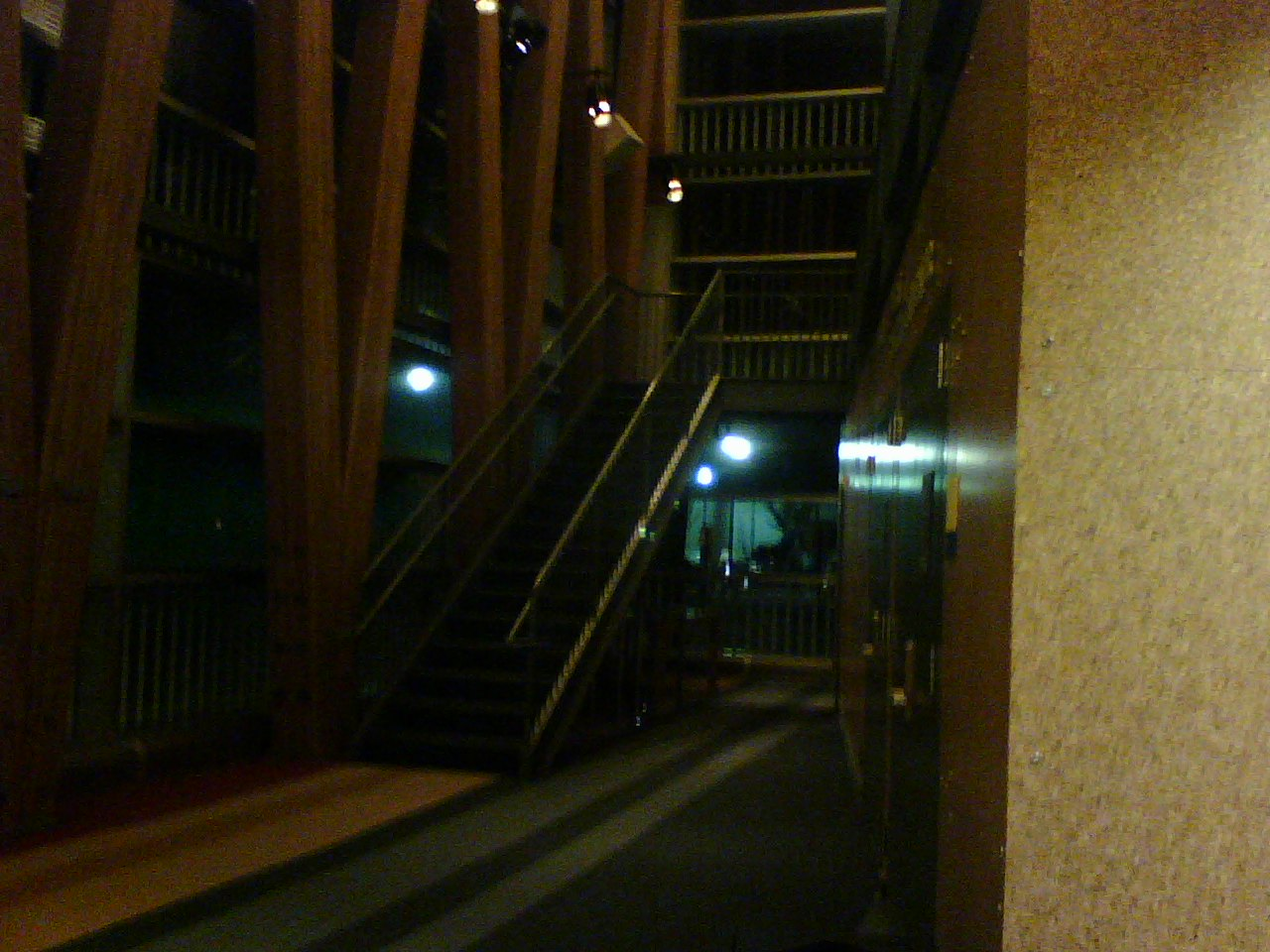
Stairs inside the theater

The Two River Theater's roof is designed to evoke the waves of a river. The building was designed by New York architect Stewart Jones, of Hardy, Holzman, Pfeiffer & Associates, who also designed the Wilma Theater in Philadelphia and the Harvey Theater at the Brooklyn Academy of Music.

The main Rechnitz Theater is a thrust stage that seats 350 patrons. The theater was built so the furthest seats would be no more than 36 feet (11 m) from the performers. The Marion Huber Theater is a fully convertible, 99-seat black box space that hosts more experimental works, readings, classes, and rehearsals. The buildings also contain an on site costume shop and set shop.

A new three story building next to the theater has increased Two Rivers rehearsal space, costume and set shop spaces and room for public programing.

== Production history ==
=== Previous seasons ===
- 2024/2025 American Mariachi, A Little Shakespeare: The Tempest, Dial M for Murder, VOS!, The Price
- 2023/2024 Hair, The Scarlett Letter, A Little Shakespeare: Love's Labour Lost, Bill Irwin On Beckett, A Thousand Maids, August Wilson's Gem of the Ocean
- 2022/2023 Wine In the Wilderness, A Little Shakespeare: Romeo and Juliet, Radio Play: Kisses Through the Glass, Living and Breathing, Romeo and Juliet, Two Sisters and a Piano
- 2021/2022 Hasan Minhaj - Experiment Time, August Wilson's Radio Golf, Radio Play - Antarctica, The Hombres, A Little Shakespeare: Much Ado About Nothing, Chekhov's Three Sisters
- 2020/2021 Your Blues Aint Sweet Like Mine, The Hombres, Seven Homeless Mammoths Wander New England, Romeo and Juliet, Radio Play: The Memory Motel, Tiny Shakes: Romeo and Juliet
- 2019/2020 Cyrano, Love In Hate Nation, Twelfth Night, A Little Shakespeare: Twelfth Night, August Wilson's Radio Golf
- 2018/2019 Pamela's First Musical, August Wilson's King Hedley II, Journey To Oz, Noises Off, A Little Shakespeare: Macbeth, Theo
- 2017/2018 A Raisin In the Sun, Skeletons: A Day of the Dead Bedtime Story, The Importance of Being Earnest, Rainbow Fish, El Coqui Espactacular and the Bottle of Doom: A Superhero Play, The Bridge of San Luis Rey
- 2016/2017 Ma Rainey’s Black Bottom, The Lion In Winter, A Very Electric Christmas, Hurricane Diane, The Merry Wives of Windsor, The Women of Padilla, and The Ballad of Little Jo
- 2015/2016 Seven Guitars, A Funny Thing Happened on the Way to the Forum, A Little Shakespeare: Pericles, Lives of Reason, Ropes, Pericles, I Remember Mama, Where the Wild Things Are
- 2014/2015 The School for Wives, Camelot, The Very Hungry Caterpillar, Absurd Person Singular, Guadalupe in the Guest Room, Your Blues Ain't Sweet Like Mine, A Little Shakespeare: A Midsummer Night's Dream, Be More Chill
- 2013/2014 On Borrowed Time, A Map of the Soul: The Tricky Part and All The Rage, A Wind in the Willows Christmas, As You Like It, A Little Shakespeare: As You Like It, Pinkolandia, Meredith Willson's 'The Music Man' - In Concert, Trouble In Mind, Third
- 2012/2013 Topdog/Underdog, No Place To Go, Henry V, A Wind in the Willows Christmas, Two Trains Running, The Electric Baby, 2.5 Minute Ride, Present Laughter
- 2011/2012 Much Ado About Nothing, Seven Homeless Mammoths Wander New England, No Child..., HONK!, Jitney, In This House, Carry It On, My Wonderful Day
- 2010/2011 Intimate Apparel, Opus, Charlotte's Web, A Thousand Clowns, Candida, Jacques Brel is Alive and Well and Living in Paris, Namaste Man, It Goes Without Saying
- 2009/2010 26 Miles, A Midsummer Night’s Dream, You're a Good Man Charlie Brown, Barefoot in the Park, Orestes, Picasso at the Lapin Agile
- 2008/2009 Too Much Light Makes the Baby Go Blind, Garden of Earthly Delights, Art, Heartbreak House, A Year with Frog and Toad, ReEntry, Mary’s Wedding, Melissa Arctic, Private Lives
- 2007/2008 Bad Dates, Our Town, The Charlatan’s Séance, Mere Mortals, The Ghost’s Bargain, Macbeth, The Glass Menagerie, A Murder A Mystery & A Marriage
- 2006/2007 Accomplice, Ain’t Misbehavin’, Tartuffe, The Pavilion, True West, The Underpants
- 2005/2006 The Umbrellas of Cherbourg, Visiting Mr. Green, All My Sons, Waiting for Godot, What The Butler Saw
- 2004/2005 Accidental Death of an Anarchist, The Beauty Queen of Leenane, The Syringa Tree, You Can’t Take It With You
- 2003/2004 The Tragedy of Carmen, Abigail’s Party, Miss Julie, A Life in the Theater
- 2002/2003 Old Wicked Songs, Spunk, Salome, Stinkin’ Rich
- 2001/2002 A Delicate Balance, Cookin’ at the Cookery, Peer Gynt, The House of Blue Leaves
- 2000/2001 Arms and the Man, La Bệte, American Buffalo, The Heiress
- 1999/2000 Blood Wedding, Uncle Vanya, The Fantasticks, Light Up the Sky
- 1998/1999 The Real Thing, Thieves’ Carnival, Hedda Gabler, Noises Off
- 1997/1998 The Dining Room, The Glass Menagerie, Machinal, The Importance of Being Earnest
- 1996/1997 A View from the Bridge, Reckless, Betrayal, Blithe Spirit
- 1995/1996 Nora, The Illusion, The Curse of the Starving Class, All in the Timing
- 1994/1995 The Cocktail Hour, The Heidi Chronicles, Misalliance

=== World premieres ===
ReEntry (January 2009), Orestes (March 2010), Seven Homeless Mammoths Wander New England (October 2011), In This House (March 2012), A Wind in the Willows Christmas (December 2012), Guadalupe in the Guest Room (February 2015), Your Blues Ain't Sweet Like Mine (April 2015), Be More Chill (May 2015), Lives of Reason (January 2016), Hurricane Diane (January 2017), The Women of Padilla (April 2017).

=== Co-productions ===
Macbeth (Folger Theatre), 26 Miles (Round House Theatre), A Midsummer Night’s Dream (California Shakespeare Theater), Orestes (Folger Theatre), Meredith Willson's The Music Man - In Concert (New Jersey Performing Arts Center)

=== Special guests ===
The theater opened in April 2005 with a live taping of VH1 Storytellers featuring Bruce Springsteen. Bon Jovi performed a two-hour set at the theater in 2005. Jackson Browne (joined by special guest Bruce Springsteen), performed a benefit concert at the theater in summer 2007.

Two River Theater has hosted a number of luminaries and award winners including Olympia Dukakis and Edward Albee. Two River has welcomed comedian Stephen Colbert and Academy Award winner, Philip Seymour Hoffman. Notable guests have also included Alec Baldwin, Kevin Kline, Suzan-Lori Parks, David Hyde Pierce, Seth Rudetsky, and Joel Grey.

At nine years old, in 2013 actor Alex Garfin made his first appearance in an Actors' Equity production in the Joel Grey play On Borrowed Time with the Two River Theater Company.

== Transfers ==
In January 2009, Two River Theater produced the world premiere of associate artistic director KJ Sanchez's ReEntry, co-written by Emily Ackerman, which followed with a month-long run at New York's Urban Stages. In May 2010 ReEntry was performed at the Navy-Marine Combat Operational Stress Control Conference in San Diego for Navy and Marine Corps line leaders, combat veterans, caregivers, and their families.

In September 2008, Two River mounted Martha Clarke's performance piece The Garden of Earthly Delights, which then played at New York's Minetta Lane Theatre.

In 2015 Be More Chill had its world premiere at Two River; in 2019 it transferred to Broadway and in 2020 it went onto London's West End.
