= Dear Evan Hansen (soundtrack) =

2021 soundtrack album by Dear Evan Hansen cast

Dear Evan Hansen (Original Motion Picture Soundtrack)

Soundtrack album by Dear Evan Hansen cast
- Released: September 24, 2021
- Recorded: 2020–2021
- Genre: Film soundtrack
- Length: 70:29
- Label: Interscope
- Producers: Alex Lacamoire; Dan Romer; Justin Paul

Benj Pasek and Justin Paul chronology
Aladdin (2019)	Dear Evan Hansen (Original Motion Picture Soundtrack) (2021)	Lyle, Lyle, Crocodile (Original Motion Picture Soundtrack) (2022)

Singles from Dear Evan Hansen: Original Motion Picture Soundtrack
- 1. "Waving Through a Window" Released: August 26, 2021; 2. "You Will Be Found" Released: August 26, 2021; 3. "Only Us" Released: September 3, 2021; 4. "Only Us (Carrie Underwood/Dan + Shay version)" Released: September 3, 2021; 5. "The Anonymous Ones" Released: September 10, 2021; 6. "The Anonymous Ones (SZA version)" Released: September 10, 2021; 7. "Sincerely, Me" Released: September 13, 2021; 8. "You Will Be Found (Sam Smith/Summer Walker version)" Released: September 17, 2021

Dear Evan Hansen: Original Motion Picture Soundtrack is the soundtrack album to the 2021 film of the same name, released on September 24, 2021, by Interscope Records. Based on the eponymous stage musical by Steven Levenson, Benj Pasek and Justin Paul, the film is directed by Stephen Chbosky, with Levenson writing the screenplay and starring Ben Platt in the title role, reprising his role from the stage performance.

The soundtrack featured most of the musical numbers from the stage play, performed by the film's ensemble cast members. Four songs were excluded from the album and instead cover versions of five of the numbers were included. Those versions were performed by Sam Smith, SZA, Summer Walker, Carrie Underwood, Dan + Shay, Finneas O'Connell, and Tori Kelly. A new song "The Anonymous Ones" was co-written by Amandla Stenberg. The musical score is composed by Dan Romer and Justin Paul, who jointly produced the album with Alex Lacamoire, who worked on the Broadway cast recording of the musical and acted as the music supervisor.

Unlike the film, which received negative reviews, the album was well received and debuted at the second position on Billboard's Top Soundtracks. The album was nominated for Best Compilation Soundtrack for Visual Media at the 64th Annual Grammy Awards. Steinberg's "The Anonymous Ones", performed by her in the film and during the end credits by SZA, was shortlisted for Best Original Song category at the 94th Academy Awards, but could not get selected for the final list of nominations.

== Development ==
In August 2020, it was confirmed that in addition to playing Alana Beck, Amandla Stenberg would collaborate with Pasek & Paul on the writing of a new song for her character. In August 2021, the title of this new song was revealed as "The Anonymous Ones". Stenberg, speaking to MTV News, had said that writing the song was mostly attributed to her resonation with the character, "I really love the way it unfolded, because we were able to capture the thing we were talking about in all of our meetings together, which is the fact that we're all going through it". The track was sung by American Singer, SZA who instantly connected with the song and came with few demos of the track. She opined that her version was "completely different and new, but also really respectful to the original melody and lyrics of the song". The cast performed most of the songs live on set.

With the official film website being launched in May 2021, it confirmed that the following songs would be included: "You Will Be Found", "Waving Through a Window", "For Forever", and "Words Fail". On the same day, Ben Platt stated in a Vanity Fair interview that "I think there's nothing major gone that anyone's going to miss. All of the major beats and all of the favorite songs are very much intact", while also hinting that another new song, entitled "A Little Closer", had been written for the film, later revealed to have been written for the character of Connor Murphy. On August 24, 2021, it was announced that the film's incidental underscore would be composed by Justin Paul and Dan Romer.

Four songs from the stage musical – "Anybody Have a Map?", "Disappear", "To Break In A Glove" and "Good For You" – were excluded from the soundtrack. This creative decision was negatively received by critics and audiences, largely due to the filmmakers' main goal to capture and immortalize Ben Platt's performance. Chbosky, in an interview to Variety, explained about the same saying:

"We had many discussions about what each number did and what we needed. It was hard. The one song I love so much and was so sad to see go was "Anybody Have a Map?" It's a great song and on stage, it works so well as an abstraction. It opens the show, we meet the families and the characters. But we felt the best way to tell the story was to start with Evan, start with "Waving Through a Window". And then, when you meet Connor's parents, they're strangers to us. We're really on Evan's journey. It freed us up to meet all the characters through Evan. And it binds the audience to a way in Evan that is so valuable. These were the kinds of discussions we had a lot."

== Release ==
The film's soundtrack album was released by Interscope Records through digital and physical formats on September 24, 2021, the same day as the film's theatrical release. It also includes covers of five of the songs by popular artists, such as Sam Smith, Finneas O'Connell, Carrie Underwood, Dan + Shay, and Tori Kelly. The first of these covers, "Only Us" (by Underwood and Dan + Shay) was released on September 3, 2021, alongside the film's version of the song. Prior to that, the film's renditions of "Waving Through a Window" and "You Will Be Found" were released as promotional singles on August 26, 2021. To promote the film, Platt performed the solo version of the latter on Season 16 of NBC's America's Got Talent, and also performed the track on The Tonight Show Starring Jimmy Fallon on September 15, 2021.

Both Stenberg and SZA's versions of "The Anonymous Ones" were released on September 10, 2021, the day after the film's world premiere. This track was later included as one of the unreleased songs from SZA's studio album Ctrl (Deluxe) on its fifth anniversary in June 2022. SZA's version of this song and Sam Smith and Summer Walker's version of "You Will Be Found" play over the closing credits, the latter song being released to the public on September 17, 2021. These were followed by "Sincerely, Me", which was released prior on September 13, 2021. Sam Smith and SZA further recorded cover editions for the soundtrack. The vinyl soundtrack was released on January 14, 2022.

== Track listing ==
All tracks are written by Pasek and Paul, with "The Anonymous Ones" written in collaboration with Amandla Stenberg.

Dear Evan Hansen (Original Motion Picture Soundtrack) track listing
No.	Title	Performer(s)	Length
1.	"Waving Through a Window"	Ben Platt; Dear Evan Hansen Choir	3:56
2.	"For Forever"	Platt	5:10
3.	"Sincerely, Me"	Colton Ryan; Platt; Nik Dodani	3:36
4.	"Requiem"	Kaitlyn Dever; Danny Pino; Amy Adams	4:24
5.	"If I Could Tell Her"	Platt; Dever	4:03
6.	"The Anonymous Ones"	Amandla Stenberg	4:43
7.	"You Will Be Found"	Platt; Stenberg; Liz Kate; DeMarius Copes; Isaac Powell; Hadiya Eshé; Dever; Dear Evan Hansen Choir	5:58
8.	"Only Us"	Dever; Platt	4:00
9.	"Words Fail"	Platt	5:46
10.	"So Big / So Small"	Julianne Moore	4:25
11.	"A Little Closer"	Ryan	4:10
12.	"You Will Be Found" (featuring Summer Walker)	Sam Smith	3:56
13.	"The Anonymous Ones"	SZA	4:09
14.	"Only Us"	Carrie Underwood; Dan + Shay	3:45
15.	"A Little Closer"	Finneas	4:02
16.	"Waving Through a Window"	Tori Kelly	4:26
Total length:			70:29

== Charts ==
Chart performance for Dear Evan Hansen
Chart (2021–2022)	Peak position
UK Album Downloads (Official Charts)	45
UK Soundtrack Albums (Official Charts)	5
US Soundtrack Albums (Billboard)	2
US Top Album Sales (Billboard)	17

== Accolades ==
Award	Date of ceremony	Category	Recipient(s)	Result	Ref.
Hollywood Music in Media Awards	November 17, 2021	Best Soundtrack Album	Dear Evan Hansen	Nominated	
Hollywood Music in Media Awards	November 17, 2021	Best Original Song – Onscreen Performance	Amandla Stenberg – "The Anonymous Ones"	Nominated	
Grammy Awards	April 3, 2022	Best Compilation Soundtrack for Visual Media	Various artists	Nominated	
