= Sincerely, Me =

Song from Dear Evan Hansen

Song by Mike Faist, Ben Platt and Will Roland

from the album Dear Evan Hansen: Original Broadway Cast Recording
- Released: January 27, 2017
- Genre: show tune
- Length: 3:42
- Songwriter: Pasek & Paul

Audio
- "Sincerely, Me" on YouTube

"Sincerely, Me" is a song from Act 1 of the 2015 musical Dear Evan Hansen, which premiered on Broadway in 2016. Benj Pasek and Justin Paul wrote both the music and lyrics to the song, whose title takes its name from the phrase with which the musical's main protagonist, Evan Hansen, ends his daily letters to himself.

== Synopsis ==
The entire song is based around fake email exchanges between late Connor Murphy and the main protagonist Evan Hansen, all written by the latter and his "family friend" Jared Kleinman. All of this is part of Evan's way to get Connor's parents to believe his lie that he and their son were friends, after Connor committed suicide earlier in the story. The song is reprised at the start of Act 2 by all three characters, but is interrupted by Evan mid-chorus when he realizes that the email exchanges are becoming unrealistic.

== Reception ==
"Sincerely, Me" received mixed-to-positive reviews by critics. Thomas Floyd of The Washington Post called "Sincerely, Me" an "irreverent rocker...with appealing zeal" in his review of the 2021 film adaptation, while Melissa Hall of BroadwayWorld called the song a "fun and playful number," in contrast with the "serious subject matter" of the musical. Conversely, in a review for RogerEbert.com of the 2021 film adaptation, Robert Daniels noted how "Sincerely, Me," alongside other songs in Dear Evan Hansen penned by Pasek and Paul, was a "garish arrangement" with "lyrics that ring with the artificial tinge of a plastic lollipop."

In 2020, Sportsshoes.com named "Sincerely, Me" the 10th-most popular show tune people went running to.

== Certifications ==
Region	Certification	Certified units/sales
United States (RIAA)	Gold	500,000^{‡}
^{‡} Sales+streaming figures based on certification alone.

== 2021 film version ==
"Sincerely, Me"

Song by Colton Ryan, Ben Platt and Nik Dodani

from the album Dear Evan Hansen: Original Motion Picture Soundtrack
- Released: September 24, 2021
- Recorded: 2020
- Genre: Musical; theatrical; pop
- Length: 3:37
- Label: Interscope
- Songwriter: Pasek & Paul
- Producers: Alex Lacamoire; Dan Romer; Pasek & Paul

Ben Platt singles chronology
"Only Us" (2021)	"Sincerely, Me" (2021)	"This Is Not Over Yet" (2023)

Audio
- "Sincerely, Me" (2021 film version) on YouTube

"Sincerely, Me" was featured in Universal Pictures' 2021 film adaptation of the musical, starring Ben Platt, who reprised his performance in the titular role and was sung by him, Colton Ryan as Connor Murphy and Nik Dodani as Jared Kalwani (changed from Kleinman to accommodate Dodani's casting). The film, which premiered at the 2021 Toronto International Film Festival on September 9, 2021, followed by a theatrical release on September 24, 2021, is directed by Stephen Chbosky from a screenplay by Levenson, who also serves as an executive producer with Michael Bederman, Pasek & Paul and the show's lead producer Stacey Mindich. Ben's father Marc Platt and Adam Siegel serve as producers.

In the film, the scene plays out the same, but now with the main lyrical portions taking place in locations such as the Westview High School library, Ellison State Park and a game room where Evan and Connor play a DDR arcade game. However, the lyric "We're close, but not that way; the only man that I love is my dad" is omitted due to the character of Larry Murphy, Zoe and Connor's father, being changed to Larry Mora, their stepfather.

While the film itself received predominantly negative reviews, as did most of the other musical numbers, its rendition of "Sincerely Me" was often viewed as a highlight.

This version of the song was made available as an exclusive download from the soundtrack album on September 13, 2021. The album was released on the same day as the film.

== Cover versions ==
- In 2018, Darren Criss, Grant Gustin and Will Roland, the latter of whom originated the role of Jared Kleinman on Broadway, performed the song at that year's Elsie Fest.
- In 2019, the musical's YouTube channel released a video of Michael Lee Brown, who understudied the roles of Evan Hansen, Connor Murphy and Jared Kleinman on Broadway, performing the song as all three roles at once.
- In 2021, Working with Lemons released a cinematic music video of the song, featuring Porter Bagley as Evan Hansen, Noah Hilker as Connor Murphy and Anson Bagley as Jared Kleinman.
- In 2021, Jared Halley and Peter Hollens recorded an a cappella medley of this song and three other songs from the musical, "Waving Through a Window," "For Forever" and "You Will Be Found," and released it on YouTube.
