= Dear Evan Hansen: Original Broadway Cast Recording =

2017 cast album of the stage musical Dear Evan Hansen

Cast recording by the original Broadway cast of Dear Evan Hansen
- Released: January 27, 2017
- Recorded: December 9–15, 2016
- Studio: Avatar, New York City
- Genre: Show tunes; hip hop; R&B; soul
- Length: 56:35
- Label: Atlantic
- Producer: Alex Lacamoire; Benj Pasek; Justin Paul

Pasek and Paul chronology
La La Land (2016)	Dear Evan Hansen: Original Broadway Cast Recording (2017)	The Greatest Showman (2017)

Singles from Dear Evan Hansen: Original Broadway Cast Recording
- 1. "Waving Through a Window" Released: November 16, 2016; 2. "Requiem" Released: January 19, 2017; 3. "You Will Be Found" Released: January 23, 2017

Dear Evan Hansen: Original Broadway Cast Recording is the cast album to the 2015 musical Dear Evan Hansen, with music and lyrics by Benj Pasek and Justin Paul, and a book by Steven Levenson. The recording stars Ben Platt, Rachel Bay Jones, Laura Dreyfuss, Jennifer Laura Thompson, Michael Park, Mike Faist, Will Roland and Kristolyn Lloyd. The album was produced by Alex Lacamoire, Pasek and Paul, and featuring musicians include Rob Jost, Adele Stein, Justin Smith, Ben Cohn, Jamie Eblen, Dillon Kondor, Justin Goldner, Christopher Jahnke and Todd Low. The album was released by Atlantic Records on January 27, 2017, and featured at #8 on the Billboard 200, making the highest debut for a cast album after Camelot (1961). It also topped the Internet Albums chart. It further received the Best Musical Theater Album award at the 60th Annual Grammy Awards.

== Promotion and release ==
The original Broadway cast album was announced on November 16, 2016, with pre-orders for the album beginning from December 9, 2016. The track "Waving Through a Window" was released as a special early download on the same date, for those who had pre-ordered the album. Additionally, the tracks "Requiem" and "You Will Be Found" were released as bonus pre-order singles on January 19 and 23, 2017. Atlantic Records released the soundtrack through digital formats on January 27, followed by a CD release on February 17. An exclusive vinyl album of the cast recording launched on July 21.

A deluxe album was announced on September 26, 2018, which contained all the songs from the Broadway cast recording, in addition to cut songs and covers. Three days prior, on September 23, Billboard exclusively released the track "Part of Me" as a single, performed by the cast from the U.S. Tour. The album was scheduled for release on October 19, but eventually released on November 2. The cut songs were performed by Taylor Trensch, Mallory Bechtel and Alex Boniello, who replaced the principal characters during the Broadway schedule. A cover version of "Waving Through a Window" was performed by Katy Perry to promote the show's national tour in North America, with her version being included in the deluxe edition.

== Commercial response ==
The album debuted at number eight on Billboard 200, registering the highest debut for a cast album after 1961's Camelot, which debuted at the fourth position. It also had surpassed 2015's Hamilton to top the Billboard 200 charts. In addition, the album was featured at number one in Top Broadway Albums and at number two in Top Pop Albums. After its win at the 71st Tony Awards, the album again peaked at number five in Billboard 200. In the first week, the album sold over 29,000 copies, with 25,000 coming from traditional sales. Over 123,000 copies were sold in the year of its release, and an additional 305,000 copies in 2018, to become one of the best-selling albums of the year. The album was certified Gold by RIAA on March 6, 2019. As of March 2021, the album sold over 640,000 copies.

== Critical reception ==
In her review for The Northern Light, Abby Seeber wrote, "The music is incredibly universal and will no doubt stand the test of time". Gramophone's Edward Seckerson wrote, "what really sets Pasek and Paul’s work apart is the emotional resonance of their melodies. The pop-rock nowness is painted in a contemporary funkiness, keyboards and guitars, acoustic and electric, dominating – but the soul of these songs is personal and timeless."

A critic for The Diamondback wrote that "Dear Evan Hansen vocalizes another timeless struggle: a dorky teenager both desperate and terrified of fitting in. This time social media plays a central role, one that heightens and elevates the stakes. The original cast album, sounds like inside of a teenager’s mind: frantic, immediate, life-or-death, now-or-never. Songs build and explode and then fall to a hush in the same way a teenagers panic, jump to conclusions and incorrectly assume their complete isolation."

== Track listing ==
All tracks are written by Benj Pasek and Justin Paul.

Dear Evan Hansen: Original Broadway Cast Recording
No.	Title	Performer(s)	Length
1.	"Anybody Have a Map?"	Rachel Bay Jones; Jennifer Laura Thompson	2:26
2.	"Waving Through a Window"	Ben Platt	3:56
3.	"For Forever"	Platt	5:01
4.	"Sincerely, Me"	Mike Faist; Platt; Will Roland	3:42
5.	"Requiem"	Laura Dreyfuss; Michael Park; Thompson	4:19
6.	"If I Could Tell Her"	Platt; Dreyfuss	4:08
7.	"Disappear"	Platt; Faist; Kristolyn Lloyd; Roland; Thompson	4:35
8.	"You Will Be Found"	Platt; Kristolyn Lloyd; Roland; Dreyfuss	6:00
9.	"To Break In A Glove"	Park; Platt	3:50
10.	"Only Us"	Platt; Dreyfuss	3:47
11.	"Good For You"	Jones; Lloyd; Roland; Platt	3:50
12.	"Words Fail"	Platt	5:51
13.	"So Big / So Small"	Jones	4:12
14.	"Finale"	Platt	1:35

Dear Evan Hansen: Original Broadway Cast Recording (Deluxe edition)
No.	Title	Performer(s)	Length
1.	"Anybody Have a Map?"	Rachel Bay Jones; Jennifer Laura Thompson	2:26
2.	"Waving Through a Window"	Ben Platt	3:56
3.	"For Forever"	Platt	5:01
4.	"Sincerely, Me"	Mike Faist; Platt; Will Roland	3:42
5.	"Requiem"	Laura Dreyfuss; Michael Park; Thompson	4:19
6.	"If I Could Tell Her"	Platt; Dreyfuss	4:08
7.	"Disappear"	Platt; Faist; Kristolyn Lloyd; Roland; Thompson	4:35
8.	"You Will Be Found"	Platt; Kristolyn Lloyd; Roland; Dreyfuss	6:00
9.	"To Break In A Glove"	Park; Platt	3:50
10.	"Only Us"	Platt; Dreyfuss	3:47
11.	"Good For You"	Jones; Lloyd; Roland; Platt	3:50
12.	"Words Fail"	Platt	5:51
13.	"So Big / So Small"	Jones	4:12
14.	"Finale"	Platt	1:35
15.	"Obvious" (Bonus track)	Taylor Trensch	4:14
16.	"Hiding In Your Hands" (Bonus track)	Mallory Bechtel	4:07
17.	"Part Of Me" (Bonus track)	August 2018 Broadway Cast; Original U.S. Tour Cast	5:06
18.	"In The Bedroom Down The Hall" (Demo)	Jones; Thompson	5:19
19.	"Disappear" (Acoustic)	Trensch; Alex Boniello	2:32
20.	"Waving Through A Window" (Katy Perry version)	Perry	3:55
Total length:			81:40

== Personnel ==
Cast

- Ben Platt – Evan Hansen
- Rachel Bay Jones – Heidi Hansen
- Laura Dreyfuss – Zoe Murphy
- Jennifer Laura Thompson – Cynthia Murphy
- Michael Park – Larry Murphy
- Mike Faist – Connor Murphy
- Will Roland – Jared Kleinman
- Kristolyn Lloyd – Alana Beck

Additionally, Taylor Trensch, Mallory Bechtel and Alex Boniello (characters who replaces the original Broadway cast) playing Evan Hansen, Zoe Murphy and Connor Murphy, also recorded the musical numbers, which were included in the extended version. Few cast from the Original U.S. Tour ensemble also performed on a track.

Ensemble vocals

- Jenn Colella
- Carrie Manolakos
- Ken Marks
- Asa Somers
- Jason Tam
- Brenda Wehle
- Natalie Weiss
- Tim Young
- Remy Zaken
- Tamika Lawrence
- Gerard Canonico
- Adam Halpin
- Becca Ayers
- Mary Bacon
- Mykal Kilgore
- Stephen Kunken

Production

- Alex Lacamoire – orchestration, music supervision, executive production, arrangements
- Benj Pasek – composition, production
- Justin Paul – composition, production, vocal arrangements
- Stacey Mindich – production
- Jeffrey M. Wilson – executive production
- Wendy Orshan – executive production
- Rachel Weinstein – associate production
- Jayne Hong – associate production
- Pete Ganbarg – A&R production
- Emily Grishman – music copyist
- Ben Cohn – music direction, conduction
- Nevin Steinberg – Broadway sound effects
- Derik Lee – recording
- Nate Odden – assistant recording
- Ron Robinson – assistant recording
- Ebonie Smith – assistant recording
- Matthew Soares – assistant recording
- Scott Wasserman – programming
- Enrico De Trizio – programming
- Jeremy King – synthesizer programming
- Taylor Williams – synthesizer programming
- Randy Cohen – keyboard programming
- Christopher Jahnke – orchestration
- Jon Balcourt – associate conduction
- Michael Keller – music coordination
- Michael Aarons – music coordination
- Haley Bennett – music assistance
- Scott Skrzynski – mixing assistance
- Ari Conte – song assistance
- Neal Avron – mixing
- Tom Coyne – mastering

Musicians

- Todd Low – viola
- Adele Stein – cello
- Ben Cohn – piano
- Jamie Eblen – drums
- Rob Jost – bass
- Dillon Kondor – guitar
- Justin Goldner – guitar
- Justin Smith – concertmaster

== Charts ==
=== Weekly charts ===
Chart (2017–2021)	Peak position
Australian Albums (ARIA)	34
Canadian Albums (Billboard)	12
UK Albums (OCC)	75
UK Soundtrack Albums (OCC)	9
US Billboard 200	8
US Pop Albums (Billboard)	3
US Top Broadway Albums (Billboard)	1
US Internet Albums (Billboard)	3

=== Year-end charts ===
Chart (2017)	Peak position
US Cast Albums (Billboard)	2
Chart (2018)	Peak position
US Cast Albums (Billboard)	2
US Pop Albums(Billboard)	19
Chart (2019)	Peak position
US Cast Albums (Billboard)	3
Chart (2020)	Peak position
US Cast Albums (Billboard)	3
Chart (2021)	Peak position
US Cast Albums (Billboard)	3

== Certifications ==
Region	Certification	Certified units/sales
United Kingdom (BPI)	Gold	400,000^{‡}
United States (RIAA)	Gold	500,000^{‡}
^{‡} Sales+streaming figures based on certification alone.

=== Song certifications ===
List of songs, with selected chart positions and available certifications
Title	Certifications
"Waving Through a Window"	RIAA: Platinum; BPI: Silver
"Sincerely, Me"	RIAA: Platinum
"You Will Be Found"	RIAA: Gold
