= Found/Tonight =

2018 charity mash-up song

Single by Lin-Manuel Miranda and Ben Platt
- Released: March 19, 2018
- Studio: Atlantic Studios, NYC
- Genre: Mashup; show tune
- Length: 2:59
- Label: Atlantic
- Songwriter(s): Lin-Manuel Miranda; Benj Pasek & Justin Paul
- Producer(s): Alex Lacamoire

Lin-Manuel Miranda singles chronology
"Almost Like Praying" (2017)	"Found/Tonight" (2018)	"A Forgotten Spot" (2018)

Ben Platt singles chronology
"Waving Through a Window" (2017)	"Found/Tonight" (2018)	"Bad Habit" (2019)

Music Video
- "Found/Tonight" on YouTube

"Found/Tonight" is a mash-up charity single of two popular musical theatre tracks from Hamilton and Dear Evan Hansen, with the proceeds partially donated to the March for Our Lives anti-gun violence movement. The song's lyrics and melodies are borrowed from "The Story of Tonight" from Hamilton, and "You Will Be Found" from Dear Evan Hansen. The track is performed by actor Ben Platt, who originated the role of Evan Hansen, and Hamilton creator and star Lin-Manuel Miranda, and was arranged by frequent Miranda collaborator Alex Lacamoire. It was released on March 19, 2018.

== Performances ==
A portion of the proceeds from the single were dedicated to the March for Our Lives initiative, which was founded earlier that year in the wake of the Stoneman Douglas High School shooting. In the release of the single, Miranda praised the student-led aspect of the movement, stating, “In the midst of their grief, [March for Our Lives] mobilized the youth of our nation and created a movement [...] this song is my way of helping to raise funds and awareness for their efforts, and to say thank you, and that we are with you, so let’s keep fighting, together.” Platt added, "I hope that this song can play some small part in bringing about real change."

Miranda and Platt also performed the song together, along with Lacamoire, at the March for Our Lives rally in Washington, D.C, a week after the song's release.

== Charts ==
"Found/Tonight" peaked at number 49 on the Billboard Hot 100 chart.
