= Only Us (Dear Evan Hansen song) =

Song from Dear Evan Hansen

Song by Laura Dreyfuss and Ben Platt

from the album Dear Evan Hansen: Original Broadway Cast Recording
- Released: 2017
- Genre: show tune
- Length: 3:49
- Songwriter: Pasek & Paul

Music video
- "Only Us" on YouTube

"Only Us" is a song from Act 2 of the 2015 musical Dear Evan Hansen, which premiered on Broadway in 2016. Benj Pasek and Justin Paul wrote both the music and lyrics to the song.

== Synopsis ==
Zoe Murphy visits the home of the main protagonist, Evan Hansen, after everything the latter had done to help her family in the wake of Zoe's brother, Connor's death. During their conversation, Zoe expresses her accepting Evan for who he is despite his difficulties and the two begin a relationship together, even though it's all being driven by Evan's lie that he was "friends" with Connor.

== 2021 film version ==
"Only Us"

Song by Kaitlyn Dever and Ben Platt

from the album Dear Evan Hansen: Original Motion Picture Soundtrack
- Released: September 24, 2021
- Recorded: 2020
- Genre: Musical; theatrical; pop
- Length: 3:59
- Label: Interscope
- Songwriter: Pasek & Paul
- Producers: Alex Lacamoire; Dan Romer; Pasek & Paul

Ben Platt singles chronology
| "You Will Be Found" (2021) | "Only Us" (2021) | "Sincerely, Me" (2021) |

Audio
- "Only Us" (2021 film version) on YouTube

"Only Us" was featured in Universal Pictures' 2021 film adaptation of the musical, starring Ben Platt, who reprised his performance in the title role and was sung by him and Kaitlyn Dever as Zoe Murphy. The film, which premiered at the 2021 Toronto International Film Festival on September 9, 2021, followed by a theatrical release on September 24, 2021, is directed by Stephen Chbosky from a screenplay by Levenson, who also serves as an executive producer with Michael Bederman, Pasek & Paul and the show's lead producer Stacey Mindich. Ben's father Marc Platt and Adam Siegel serve as producers.

In the film, the scene plays out the same. However, during the final chorus, there are flash forwards intercut into the scene, showing the growth of Evan and Zoe's relationship by going to prom and on a date to an amusement park.

This version of the song was made available as an exclusive download from the soundtrack album on September 3, 2021, alongside Carrie Underwood and Dan + Shay's version. The album was released on the same day as the film.

== Carrie Underwood and Dan + Shay version ==
"Only Us"

Song by Carrie Underwood and Dan + Shay

from the album Dear Evan Hansen: Original Motion Picture Soundtrack
- Released: September 24, 2021
- Recorded: 2021
- Genre: Musical; theatrical; pop
- Length: 3:45
- Label: Interscope
- Songwriter: Pasek & Paul
- Producer: Dan Smyers

Music video
- "Only Us" (Carrie Underwood/Dan + Shay version) on YouTube

Carrie Underwood and Dan + Shay also recorded a cover of the song for the soundtrack album of the 2021 film version. It was released as an exclusive download on September 3, 2021. A music video of their version, showing Underwood and Dan + Shay recording the song in the studio, intercut with footage of Platt and Dever as Evan and Zoe in the film, was released on September 24, 2021.

== Cover versions ==
- In 2017, Evelyne and Peter Hollens released a cover of the song as a single.
- In 2018, Bat Out of Hell: The Musical stars Rob Fowler and Sharon Sexton recorded a cover of the song for their album Vision of You.
- Ben Levi Ross and Taylor Trensch, both of whom took over the role of Evan Hansen on stage in the Broadway production, released a special "same-sex" cover of the song on February 14, 2019, in honor of Valentine's Day.
- In April 17, 2020, Bella Ramsey and Jacob Fowler released a cover of the song.
- In 2021, Samantha Barks and Ramin Karimloo recorded a cover of the song for the former's album Into the Unknown.
- In 2021, Finding Us recorded a cover of the song and released it as a single.
