= Mike Faist =

American actor (born 1992)

- Born: Michael David Faist; January 5, 1992 (age 34); Gahanna, Ohio, U.S.
- Education: American Musical and Dramatic Academy
- Occupation: Actor
- Years active: 2011–present

Michael David Faist (/faɪst/ FEIST; born January 5, 1992) is an American actor. His accolades include a Grammy Award and a Daytime Emmy Award, as well as nominations for a Tony Award and a BAFTA Award.

An alumnus of the American Musical and Dramatic Academy, Faist began his acting career in 2011 in Disney's Newsies, appearing in its Broadway production (2012–2013). He continued to appear in several independent films, television series and starring in Off-Broadway productions before his breakthrough role in the Broadway musical Dear Evan Hansen (2015–2018), for which he was nominated for the Tony Award for Best Featured Actor in a Musical and won the Grammy Award for Best Musical Theater Album.

In 2021, Faist starred in the television series Panic and had his first major film part as Riff, the leader of the Jets, in Steven Spielberg's West Side Story, for which he received a nomination for the BAFTA Award for Best Actor in a Supporting Role. He has since played Jack Twist in a West End theatre production of Brokeback Mountain (2023) and starred in the heated romance Challengers (2024). In 2026, Faist starred as Charles Trask in the Netflix miniseries East of Eden.

== Early life and education ==
Michael David Faist was born on January 5, 1992, in Gahanna, Ohio, and was adopted by Julia and Kurt Faist. The family owns a real estate business. As a child, Faist realized he wanted to pursue a career in the performing arts. He was enticed by dancing after seeing Gene Kelly and Fred Astaire in old MGM films, especially Kelly in Singin' in the Rain. "Just the way he performed and moved, he was able to tell a story through movement," Faist said. At the age of 5, he pressured his parents to enroll him in dance classes and began auditioning for community theater and children's theater. In a Columbus Children's Theatre production of The Wizard of Oz, he played one of the Lollipop Guild, later joining the cast of Oliver! and Alice in Wonderland.

Faist fell in love with acting while attending The Academy of Performing Arts (TAPA) company in Columbus, Ohio, and while at Gahanna Lincoln High School he acted in several productions, such as Danny Zuko in Grease and Simon in Jesus Christ Superstar. At the age of 17, Faist met his birth mother and her family, who are mostly pilots by profession. The eldest of his two half-brothers taught him how to fly. Faist has since then obtained his pilot's license. Faist's father died in December 2023 of pulmonary fibrosis.

In 2009, he graduated from high school a year early and moved to New York to pursue a stage career. He enrolled in the American Musical and Dramatic Academy but dropped out after two semesters. While auditioning for Off-Broadway plays, he began selling tickets in Times Square. On his first job as a professional actor in the play White Christmas, he was collecting food stamps, earning $150 per week, and living in the back of a McDonald's parking lot.

== Career ==
=== 2011–2014: Early work ===
Faist began his acting career in 2011, originating the role of Morris Delancey, a bully and publisher Joseph Pulitzer's henchman, in the regional premiere of Newsies at the Paper Mill Playhouse. When the musical transferred to Broadway, he understudied the lead role of Jack Kelly, a newsboy who leads his colleagues in a strike against the publisher, in addition to his other roles. Faist had to alternately play the roles in quick succession during the opening number. "You have to really make sure you're warmed up vocally and physically and you're mentally prepared," Faist said of the demands of his dual role, but added, "It's not hard to have fun in Newsies, about the uprising of children, a new generation coming in to take over the old." Newsies opened to critical acclaim and was nominated for Best Musical at the 66th Tony Awards. In 2012, he made his feature film debut in the coming-of-age drama The Unspeakable Act. The independent film received positive reviews.

Faist went on to star as Rhys Thurston in Branden Jacobs-Jenkins's play Appropriate Off-Broadway in 2014, which drew critical acclaim from chief theater critic Ben Brantley of The New York Times. In 2015, he appeared as Skip in the short film Yellow, a psychiatric ward patient in Touched with Fire, and Gordie Joiner in The Grief of Others which received critical and generally positive reviews. He was also cast in an unaired pilot of the series Eye Candy as Olsen and co-starred as tutor Aleksei Belyaev opposite Peter Dinklage in an Off-Broadway production of A Month in the Country.

=== 2015–2020: Theatre breakthrough ===
In August 2015, he originated the role of Connor Murphy in the hit musical Dear Evan Hansen, playing the role of the drug addict from the workshop till its Broadway transfer in 2016. The musical received critical acclaim and earned Faist a Tony Award nomination for Best Actor in a Featured Role in a Musical. Along with his cast members, he also won the Grammy Award for Best Musical Theater Album and the Daytime Emmy Award for Outstanding Musical Performance in a Daytime Program for their performance of "You Will Be Found" on The Today Show. Of his process for developing his character, a suicidal high school student, Faist said that he "read stories by real survivors on a website, livethroughthis.org. I realized that there seems to be a general lack of self-love and empathy in our society. I hope that when people see the show, they'll say, 'Oh, I am loved. I'm exactly who I am, and I am enough'." Along with cast members Ben Levi Ross and Mallory Bechtel, Faist lent his voice for the audiobook version of Val Emmich's Dear Evan Hansen: The Novel, a book adaptation of the musical released in October 2018.

The two following years, Faist continued to feature in small independent films including Our Time, I Can I Will I Did and Active Adults. He also appeared in crime procedural dramas Law & Order Special Victims Unit in a 2017 episode as Glenn Lawrence. In October 2017, he taught Improv and acting exercises in a Broadway Musical Theatre Workshop and also held a master class for audition technique and song interpretation. He taught the same class in Montreal that November.

In 2018, he appeared in an episode of Deception and starred in the Second Stage Theater production of Days of Rage as Spence, a conflicted and passionate young man torn between causes and women. He also appeared in the horror-fantasy film Wildling opposite Bel Powley. It premiered at South by Southwest to mixed reviews. In 2020, he played a starring role as Arthur in the small independent drama The Atlantic City Story.

=== 2021–present: West Side Story and expansion ===
In 2021, Faist co-starred as Dodge Mason in the Amazon's teen drama thriller Panic. The New York Times spoke of Faist, describing him as tall and lanky, making quite a striking figure in the series, "With a slender charisma and a bone structure that seems to have been sculpted with a scythe, the actor could easily have embarked on Panic. But his sensitivity is closer to that of leading men as atypical as Adam Driver, and he modernizes a potentially versatile piece." Despite receiving positive reviews from critics, the series was canceled after one season. Faist received a nomination for his work by the Critics Choice Association in the category Best Actor in an Action Series at the 2nd Critics' Choice Super Awards.

Later that year, he had his first major movie role in Steven Spielberg's film adaptation of West Side Story as Riff, Tony's best friend and leader of the Jets gang. The film was a critical success and some critics deemed it superior to the 1961 film. His performance earned universal praise from critics. The Washington Post regards his magnetic performance as West Side Story's "stand-out" as its chief film critic Ann Hornaday wrote "The revelation in this production, however, is Mike Faist, who is not only a gifted singer and dancer, but plays Jets gang leader Riff with just the right mix of spiky resentment, hair-trigger anger and loose-limbed grace.". On his collaboration with Faist, screenwriter Tony Kushner says, "He really wants to think about economics, politics, psychology, and psychotechnology, and he feeds himself with a kind of acuity and precision that I think is the mark of a great actor." To craft a new version of his character, Faist took inspiration from a 1959 Bruce Davidson photography book entitled Brooklyn Gang. "You look at those photos and you see these people, the nihilism that exists, their inability to see past tomorrow, or even today for that matter. There's something depressing about it, also carnal, wild, and primal," Faist explained. For his performance, Faist received a nomination for Best Actor in a Supporting Role at the 75th British Academy Film Awards.

Faist made his West End debut in the stage adaptation of Brokeback Mountain as Jack Twist, opposite Lucas Hedges as Ennis Del Mar, in May 2023 at the @sohoplace theatre. The production received mixed reviews but Faist earned acclaim with Arifa Akbar of The Guardian writing, "[the two leads] chemistry comes alive as boyish romance, with play fighting and suddenly grabbing ardour...both actors are compelling, Faist especially so as the ebullient Jack". Faist portrayed photographer Danny Lyon in Jeff Nichols' The Bikeriders opposite Austin Butler, Jodie Comer and Tom Hardy. Faist practiced photography and spent a weekend with Lyon, in addition to studying Lyon's personal audio recordings and other material. The film premiered at the 2023 Telluride Film Festival to positive reviews. Sheri Linden of The Hollywood Reporter noted that despite Faist's "charismatic screen presence, [he] was somewhat wasted here".

Faist starred with Zendaya and Josh O'Connor in Luca Guadagnino's romantic drama Challengers as Art, a famed tennis player facing his rival. He gained 30 pounds for the role and practiced tennis. The film was originally set to premiere at the 80th Venice International Film Festival but was delayed by the studio to 2024 due to the 2023 SAG-AFTRA strike. The film received positive reviews from critics. It was announced that Faist would return to the stage acting opposite in Michelle Williams in a revival of Eugene O'Neill's play Anna Christie at St. Ann's Warehouse with performances running from November 25 to February 1, 2026. However, he ultimately pulled out of the production and was replaced.

Faist played Charles Trask in the 2026 Netflix miniseries East of Eden alongside Florence Pugh and Christopher Abbott, an adaptation of John Steinbeck's 1952 novel created by Zoe Kazan.

=== Writing work ===
Faist writes short stories and has stated that it is important for an actor to write in order to understand scripts. He helped to establish a playwright's festival, the Ohio Artists Gathering, which he described as "a one-week theater festival bringing artists from New York and LA and integrating them with local actors, writers, and directors." The first festival was held in Columbus, Ohio in 2018. His Bikeriders director Jeff Nichols shared in an interview that Faist was writing a screenplay and might want to become a filmmaker himself.

== Acting credits ==
=== Film ===
Year	Title	Role	Notes
2012	The Unspeakable Act	Tony	
2015	Yellow	Skip	Short film
2015	Touched with Fire	Additional Psych Ward Patient	
2015	The Grief of Others	Gordie Joiner	
2016	Our Time	Benny	
2017	I Can I Will I Did	Ben	
2017	Active Adults	Teenage Boy	
2018	Wildling	Lawrence	
2020	The Atlantic City Story	Arthur	
2021	West Side Story	Riff	
2022	Pinball: The Man Who Saved the Game	Roger Sharpe	
2023	The Bikeriders	Danny Lyon	
2024	Challengers	Art Donaldson	

=== Television ===
Year	Title	Role	Notes
2012	Dancing with the Stars	Himself	Guest Performance/Ensemble
2015	Eye Candy	Olsen	Episode: "Unaired Original Pilot"
2017	Law & Order: Special Victims Unit	Glenn Lawrence	Episode: "Complicated"
2018	Deception	Ben "Mekka" Evans	Episode: "Masking"
2021	Panic	Dodge Mason	Main role
2026	East of Eden	Charles Trask	6 episodes

=== Theater ===
Year(s)	Title	Role	Location	Notes
2011	Newsies	Morris Delancey u/s Jack Kelly	Paper Mill Playhouse	Regional
2012–13	Newsies	Morris Delancey u/s Jack Kelly	Nederlander Theatre	Broadway
2014	Appropriate	Rhys Thurston	Pershing Square Signature Center	Off-Broadway
2014	Alice by Heart	White Rabbit/Alfred Hallam/March Hare	MCC Theater	Workshop
2015	A Month in the Country	Aleksei Belyaev	Classic Stage Company	Off-Broadway
2015	Dear Evan Hansen	Connor Murphy	Arena Stage	Regional
2016	Dear Evan Hansen	Connor Murphy	Second Stage Theater	Off-Broadway
2016–18	Dear Evan Hansen	Connor Murphy	Music Box Theatre	Broadway
2018	Days of Rage	Spence	Second Stage Theater	Off-Broadway
2023	Brokeback Mountain	Jack Twist	@sohoplace	West End

== Discography ==
=== Soundtrack ===
Year	Song	Show/film title	Album title	Notes
2017	"Sincerely, Me"	Dear Evan Hansen	Dear Evan Hansen (Original Broadway Cast Recording)	with Ben Platt and Will Roland
2017	"Disappear"	Dear Evan Hansen	Dear Evan Hansen (Original Broadway Cast Recording)	with Ben Platt, Kristolyn Lloyd, Will Roland, and Jennifer Laura Thompson
2021	"Jet Song"	West Side Story	West Side Story (2021 Soundtrack)	
2021	"Tonight Quintet"	West Side Story	West Side Story (2021 Soundtrack)	with David Alvarez, Ariana DeBose, Ansel Elgort, and Rachel Zegler
2021	"Cool"	West Side Story	West Side Story (2021 Soundtrack)	with Ansel Elgort

=== Cast album ===
Title	Details	Peak chart positions			
Title	Details	US	US Cast	AUS	CAN
Dear Evan Hansen (Original Broadway Cast Recording)	Release date: February 3, 2017; Label: Atlantic; Formats: CD, LP, digital download, streaming	8	1	34	58
West Side Story (Original Motion Picture Soundtrack)	Release date: December 3, 2021; Label: Hollywood Records; Formats: CD, Vinyl, digital Dolby Atmos Music, streaming				

== Awards and nominations ==
Association	Year	Category	Work	Result	Ref.
Tony Awards	2017	Best Actor in a Featured Role in a Musical	Dear Evan Hansen	Nominated	
Broadway.com Audience Awards	2017	Favorite Featured Actor in a Musical	Dear Evan Hansen	Nominated	
Broadway.com Audience Awards	2017	Favorite Breakthrough Performance (Male)	Dear Evan Hansen	Won	
Grammy Awards	2018	Best Musical Theater Album	Dear Evan Hansen	Won	
Daytime Emmy Awards	2018	Outstanding Musical Performance in a Daytime Program	"You Will Be Found" from Dear Evan Hansen on The Today Show	Won	
Chicago Film Critics Association	2021	Best Supporting Actor	West Side Story	Nominated	
Portland Critics Association Awards	2021	Best Male Supporting Role	West Side Story	Nominated	
Indiana Film Journalists Association	2021	Best Supporting Actor	West Side Story	Nominated	
New Mexico Film Critics	2021	Best Supporting Actor	West Side Story	Nominated	
Phoenix Critics Circle	2021	Best Supporting Actor	West Side Story	Won	
Greater Western New York Film Critics Association	2021	Best Supporting Actor	West Side Story	Nominated	
Greater Western New York Film Critics Association	2021	Breakthrough Performance	West Side Story	Nominated	
British Academy Film Awards	2022	Best Actor in a Supporting Role	West Side Story	Nominated	
Chicago Indie Critics	2022	Best Supporting Actor	West Side Story	Nominated	
Latino Entertainment Journalists Association Film Awards	2022	Best Performance by an Actor in a Supporting Role	West Side Story	Nominated	
National Society of Film Critics	2022	Best Supporting Actor	West Side Story	3rd place	
Dorian Awards	2022	Best Supporting Film Performance	West Side Story	Nominated	
North Dakota Film Society	2022	Best Supporting Actor	West Side Story	Nominated	
Online Film Critics Society	2022	Best Supporting Actor	West Side Story	Nominated	
Online Film & Television Association	2022	Best Supporting Actor	West Side Story	Nominated	
Online Film & Television Association	2022	Best Breakthrough Performance: Male	West Side Story	Won	
Critics' Choice Super Awards	2022	Best Actor in an Action Series	Panic	Nominated	
Cannes Film Festival	2024	Trophée Chopard	—N/a	Honored	
Astra Midseason Movie Awards	2024	Best Supporting Actor	Challengers	Nominated	
