= Waving Through a Window =

Song by Ben Platt from Dear Evan Hansen

- 12" Vinyl cover

Single by Ben Platt & Original Broadway Cast of Dear Evan Hansen

from the album Dear Evan Hansen: Original Broadway Cast Recording
- Released: January 27, 2017
- Genre: Show tune
- Length: 3:56
- Songwriter: Pasek & Paul

Ben Platt singles chronology
"Waving Through a Window" (2017)	"Found/Tonight" (2018)

Audio
- "Waving Through a Window" on YouTube

"Waving Through a Window" is the second song from Act 1 of the 2015 musical Dear Evan Hansen, which premiered on Broadway in 2016. Benj Pasek and Justin Paul wrote both the music and lyrics for the song, which serves as the main protagonist Evan Hansen's "I Want" song. It has since become the signature tune of the character and one of the musical's most popular songs.

== Synopsis ==
The song takes place during the first high school scene after Connor Murphy, following a joke Jared Kleinman, Evan Hansen's "family friend," makes to him about his hair length, pushes Evan to the ground due to mistakenly interpreting Evan's awkwardness as making fun of him. During the number, Evan expresses his struggles with his social anxiety and depression, as well as his longing to be accepted by his peers in his community and at school. ("On the outside always looking in, will I ever be more than I've always been?"). After the first chorus, a dialogue break takes place where Zoe Murphy runs into Evan to apologize for her brother's behavior. This results in Evan acting awkward toward her and he fails to make a connection, even though it is already known beforehand that he is infatuated with her. Evan then continues singing alone, wondering if being ignored and left behind is to be his life going forward and if one day "Will [I] ever make a sound?" The entire cast then joins in for the final chorus. The song is reprised twice afterward, first in the following scene in the computer lab when Evan writes the letter to himself that becomes the catalyst of the events that follow, and then by Alana Beck before Evan goes to the Principal's Office to meet Cynthia and Larry, Connor and Zoe's parents, after Connor dies of suicide.

== Lyrical analysis ==
The final chorus is based on the metaphor "If a tree crashes in the forest and no one is there to hear it, did it make a sound?"; however, Steven Levenson, the musical's librettist, came up with the idea of Evan "literally falling in a forest," resulting in the final lyric. The opening lyrics of the song ("I've learned to slam on the brake, before I even turn the key") return during the climax of "Words Fail" in Act 2 to bring Evan's journey full circle.

== Reception ==
In his review of the Broadway production of the musical for The New York Times, Charles Isherwood praised Ben Platt's performance, writing "...when Mr. Platt sings Evan's songs — including the touching introductory cri de coeur, "Waving Through a Window" — we can simultaneously hear the heartsore, conflicted young man and the intelligent, kindly kid buried inside him." On July 23, 2020, "Waving Through a Window" was named the "Most Listened To Song From Musicals In The Car" from a study by Halfords analyzing the top "road trip" songs from multiple genres through Spotify playlists. In 2020, Sportsshoes.com named "Waving Through a Window" the 2nd-most popular show tune people went running to.

== Charts ==
Charts
Chart (2017)	Peak position
US Billboard Dance Club Songs	1

== Certifications ==
Region	Certification	Certified units/sales
United Kingdom (BPI)	Gold	400,000^{‡}
United States (RIAA)	Platinum	1,000,000^{‡}
^{‡} Sales+streaming figures based on certification alone.

== 2021 film version ==
"Waving Through a Window"

Song by Ben Platt and Dear Evan Hansen Choir

from the album Dear Evan Hansen: Original Motion Picture Soundtrack
- Released: September 24, 2021
- Recorded: 2020
- Genre: Musical; theatrical; pop
- Length: 3:56
- Label: Interscope
- Songwriter: Pasek & Paul
- Producers: Alex Lacamoire; Dan Romer; Pasek & Paul

Ben Platt singles chronology
"I Wanna Love You But I Don't" (2021)	"Waving Through a Window" (2021)	"You Will Be Found" (2021)

Audio
- "Waving Through a Window" (2021 film version) on YouTube

"Waving Through a Window" was featured in Universal Pictures' 2021 film adaptation of the musical, starring Ben Platt, who reprised his performance in the titular role. The film, which premiered at the 2021 Toronto International Film Festival on September 9, 2021, followed by a theatrical release on September 24, 2021, is directed by Stephen Chbosky from a screenplay by Levenson, who also serves as an executive producer with Michael Bederman, Pasek & Paul, and the show's lead producer Stacey Mindich. Ben's father Marc Platt and Adam Siegel serve as producers.

In the film, the song is moved to the first scene in Evan's bedroom following his opening monologue and plays through his journey to the high school and his being unable to connect with the other students when in the halls, ending in the school's gymnasium. This was a result of the cutting of "Anybody Have a Map?", the opening number of the stage musical. This creative decision was negatively received by critics and audiences, largely due to the filmmakers' main goal to capture and immortalize Ben Platt's performance. Chbosky explained the reason for this, saying that "...we felt the best way to tell the story was to start with Evan, start with ‘Waving Through a Window’. And then, when you meet Connor's parents, they're strangers to us. We're really on Evan's journey. It freed us up to meet all the characters through Evan. And it binds the audience to a way in Evan that is so valuable."

This version of the song was made available as an exclusive download from the soundtrack album on August 26, 2021, alongside "You Will Be Found." The album was released on September 24, 2021, the same day as the film. Platt also performed the song on The Tonight Show Starring Jimmy Fallon on September 15, 2021 to promote the film.

On March 4, 2022, a clip of the climax of this film's version of the song was uploaded to Twitter as a parody response to a viral clip of the opening long take shot of "The Dance at the Gym" sequence from Steven Spielberg's 2021 film version of West Side Story, that was uploaded the weekend before. Like that clip, it went viral, reaching over a million views and over 15,000 likes, leading many users to compare the visual styles and production values of the two films.

== Owl City version ==
"Waving Through a Window"
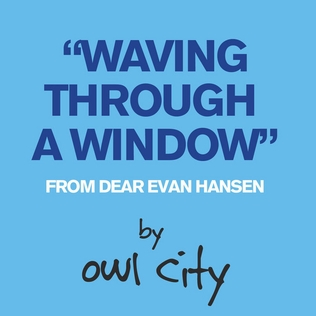

Song by Owl City
- Released: June 23, 2017
- Genre: Electropop
- Length: 4:07
- Label: Atlantic
- Songwriters: Pasek & Paul
- Producer: Adam Young

Audio
- "Waving Through a Window" (Owl City version) on YouTube

American electronica project Owl City covered the song and released it on June 23, 2017 via Atlantic Records.

=== Background and composition ===
In an interview with Billboard magazine, Adam Young revealed that the Dear Evan Hansen team approached him as they wanted to re-imagine a pop version of the track.

"It was them calling me saying 'We're big fans of your work' — which I still can't believe — 'we're trying to kind of re-imagine 'Waving Through a Window' in more of a pop genre versus the theatrical version.' And they said they looked at each other and thought, 'Let's get the Owl City guy'."

He also revealed that he had not been familiar with the project before listening to the song and covering it. After listening to the song, Young stated that the lyrics "resonated" with him and noted that the experience covering the track was "surreal". The track runs at 124 BPM and is in the key of A major. Young's range in the song spans from the notes A2 – B♭4.

=== Critical reception ===
Marc Snetiker of Entertainment Weekly stated, "In Owl City's version, the song is notably lighter and more upbeat, but don't mistake it for a lack of emotion."

=== Personnel ===
Credits for "Waving Through a Window" adapted from AllMusic.

Owl City

- Adam Young – vocals, programming, producer, recording

Production

- Ted Jensen – mastering
- Robert Orton – mixing
- Benj Pasek – composer, lyricist
- Justin Paul – composer, lyricist

== Notable cover versions ==
- In 2017, a cover of the song by Thomas Sanders, Dodie Clark, and Ben J. Pierce was released on YouTube.
- In 2017, string quartet Well-Strung released a cover of the song as a music video.
- At the songwriters' request, the song was covered by American singer Katy Perry in 2018 to promote the musical's touring production and subsequently included on the deluxe edition of the cast recording.
- In 2019, Ramin Karimloo covered the song for his album From Now On.
- In 2019, Pentatonix released a cover of the song as a single with an accompanying music video.
- In 2019, Darren Criss performed the song at the 5th Annual Elsie Fest.
- In 2020, Lindsay Pearce of Wicked performed the song as part of BroadwayWorld's Living Room Concerts series.
- In 2020, The Gay Men's Chorus of Washington, DC released a virtual performance cover of the song on YouTube.
- In 2021, Stephanie J. Block, Deborah Cox and Lea Salonga performed the song as part of that year's virtual edition of Broadway Backwards.
- In 2021, Tori Kelly recorded a cover of the song, produced by Justin Goldner, for the soundtrack album of the 2021 film adaptation.
