= A Forgotten Spot =

Song performed by American composer Lin-Manuel Miranda

"A Forgotten Spot (Olvidado)"

Single by Lin-Manuel Miranda, Zion & Lennox, De La Ghetto, Ivy Queen, PJ Sin Suela and Lucecita Benítez

from the album Hamildrops: The Complete Collection
- Released: September 20, 2018
- Recorded: 2018
- Genre: Latin pop; reggaeton
- Length: 5:46
- Label: Atlantic; Warner
- Songwriters: Lin-Manuel Miranda; Luz Benítez; Pedro Bragan; Alberto Carrión; Rafael Castillo; Pablo Fuentes; Jeffrey Penalva; Martha Pesante; Gabriel Pizarro; Félix Ortiz; Pedro Vázquez
- Producer: Trooko

Lin-Manuel Miranda singles chronology
"Found/Tonight" (2018)	"A Forgotten Spot (Olvidado)" (2018)	"Cheering For Me Now" (2018)

"A Forgotten Spot (Olvidado)" is a song performed by American composer Lin-Manuel Miranda along with Puerto Rican singers Zion & Lennox, De La Ghetto, Ivy Queen, PJ Sin Suela and Lucecita Benítez. It was released on September 20, 2018 by Atlantic Records and Warner Music Group. The song was written by Miranda, along with the rest of the collaborators.

The song was released on the first anniversary of Hurricane Maria which directly struck Puerto Rico in 2017. The song peaked at number 13 and number 12 on the Billboard Latin Digital and Latin Rhythm Digital Songs charts, respectively.

In 2025, Miranda released an album entitled, Hamildrops: The Complete Collection featuring the song.

== Background ==
Following the release of Miranda's 2016 mixtape, The Hamilton Mixtape, based on the 2015 Broadway musical Hamilton, it was announced that a second mixtape would be released. In December 2017, Miranda admitted he was having trouble compiling a second album that satisfied him as much as the first mixtape, and cancelled the second volume, announcing that instead he would be releasing thirteen tracks, once a month, over the following year. He referred to these releases as "Hamildrops."

Hurricane Maria struck the island of Puerto Rico in September 2017. An estimated 2,975 people died in Puerto Rico alone. The U.S. government response was widely criticized as inadequate and slow.

In October 2017, Miranda released "Almost Like Praying" a month after Hurricane Maria struck the island. The song was released to support relief efforts in Puerto Rico following the hurricane. The song debuted at number 20 on the Billboard Hot 100 and number one on the Billboard Digital Songs Sales chart, selling 111,000 downloads and achieving 5.2 million streams in its first week of availability in the US. Proceeds from the song were donated in full to the Hispanic Federation's UNIDOS Disaster Relief and Recovery Program, destined for the victims and survivors of the hurricane.

== Musical composition ==
The song was inspired by the opening number for Hamilton, "Alexander Hamilton," which features Leslie Odom Jr., Anthony Ramos, Daveed Diggs, Okieriete Onaodowan, Miranda, Phillipa Soo, Christopher Jackson, & the Cast of Hamilton. The song's refrain is taken directly from a lyric on "Alexander Hamilton."

"A Forgotten Spot" is performed primarily in Spanish. It was written to bring awareness and support to the ongoing recovery efforts in Puerto Rico following Hurricane Maria. Its lyrics analyze the current situation in Puerto Rico following the Hurricane. The song's lyrics also criticize the death toll controversy and response from American president Donald Trump associated with Hurricane Maria.

== Release ==
The song was posted to Miranda's official YouTube channel on September 19, 2018. It was released digitally the next day, September 20, 2018. Its release commemorates the one-year anniversary of Hurricane Maria. On May 22, 2025, Miranda released Hamildrops: The Complete Collection, with "A Forgotten Spot" as the ninth track of the album.

== Critical reception ==
Jon Blistein of Rolling Stone magazine boasted about the song featuring an "all-star" cast of "some of Puerto Rico's most prominent musicians." He later claimed the song's producer to have crafted a beat "packed with light synths and crisp drums that dance around speaker-rattling bass." Catherine Toruno of the Miami New Times also noted how the song featured "top Puerto Rican artists." An editor for the Diario Metro de Puerto Rico praised the rap performed on the song by Benitez, claiming it to showcase her versatile artistic abilities. They continued by labeling the rap a "positive surprise." The Puerto Rican television station WAPA-TV expressed similar sentiments towards Benitez's performance. For the week of September 20, 2018—September 27, 2018, it was the second most listened to Latin pop song on Apple Music in the United States.

== Chart performance ==
Chart (2018)	Peak Position
US Latin Digital Songs (Billboard)	13
US Latin Rhythm Digital Songs (Billboard)	12

== Credits ==
Credits adapted from Tidal.

- Alberto Carrión — background vocals, composer
- Atlantic Records — record label
- Chris Gehringer — mastering engineer
- Daniel Diaz — percussion
- De La Ghetto — composer, main artist
- Ivy Queen — composer, main artist
- Leo Genovese — accordion
- Lin-Manuel Miranda — background vocals, composer, executive producer, main artist
- Lucecita Benitez — composer, main artist
- PJ Sin Suela - composer, main artist
- Trooko — mixing engineer, musical producer, programmer, synthesizer
- Zion & Lennox — composer, main artist

== Release history ==
List of release dates, showing regions, formats, labels and references
Region	Date	Format	Label	Ref.
United States	September 20, 2018	Digital download; streaming	Atlantic; Warner	
