= No Hard Feelings (2023 film) =

American film by Gene Stupnitsky

- Theatrical release poster
- Directed by: Gene Stupnitsky
- Written by: Gene Stupnitsky; John Phillips
- Produced by: Alex Saks; Naomi Odenkirk; Marc Provissiero; Jennifer Lawrence; Justine Ciarrocchi
- Starring: Jennifer Lawrence; Andrew Barth Feldman; Laura Benanti; Natalie Morales; Matthew Broderick
- Cinematography: Eigil Bryld
- Edited by: Brent White
- Music by: Mychael Danna; Jessica Rose Weiss
- Production companies: Columbia Pictures; Saks Picture Company; Odenkirk Provissiero Entertainment; Excellent Cadaver
- Distributed by: Sony Pictures Releasing
- Release date: June 23, 2023
- Running time: 103 minutes
- Country: United States
- Language: English
- Budget: $45 million
- Box office: $87.3 million

No Hard Feelings is a 2023 American sex comedy film starring Jennifer Lawrence as a woman hired by a wealthy couple to romance their romantically and sexually inexperienced son, played by Andrew Barth Feldman. The film is directed by Gene Stupnitsky from a screenplay he co-wrote with John Phillips. Along with Lawrence—who was one of the film's producers—and Feldman, the film stars Laura Benanti, Natalie Morales, and Matthew Broderick.

The project was announced in October 2021, when Sony Pictures Releasing and Columbia Pictures won a bidding war between Apple Original Films, Netflix and Universal Pictures. Lawrence joined the cast and produced the film with Stupnitsky attached to direct it. Much of the cast joined in September to October 2022. Filming began in late September in various Nassau County locations in the New York City metropolitan area and finished in November.

No Hard Feelings was theatrically released in the United States on June 23, 2023, by Sony Pictures Releasing. It received positive reviews from critics and grossed over $87 million worldwide against a $45 million budget. Lawrence earned a nomination for Best Actress in a Motion Picture – Comedy or Musical at the 81st Golden Globe Awards, and won the Comedy Movie Star of the Year award at the 49th People's Choice Awards. The film was nominated for Best Comedy at the 29th Critics' Choice Awards.

== Plot ==
32-year-old Maddie Barker is an Uber driver and bartender in Montauk, New York. As she owes property taxes on the home she inherited from her mother, her car is being repossessed, and she faces bankruptcy. Desperate to keep her home, Maddie responds to an unusual Craigslist posting. Wealthy couple Alison and Laird Becker seek someone to date their 19-year-old son Percy in exchange for a Buick Regal. As he is shy and has no experience with girls, drinking, parties, or sex, his parents hope to boost his confidence and "get him out of his shell" before he attends Princeton University.

Maddie attempts to seduce Percy at the animal shelter where he volunteers. When she offers him a ride home, he thinks she is attempting to kidnap him and maces her. Despite this, she agrees to a date. Maddie and Percy meet at a bar the next night and then go skinny dipping at the beach. While they are swimming, drunken teenagers steal their clothes. Naked, Maddie attacks them, frightening Percy, who refuses to have sex with her. When Maddie tries to leave with his clothes, Percy jumps on her car, naked, and they outrun the police. As they attempt to have sex at her home, he develops an anxiety rash, so Maddie instead takes care of him.

Maddie and Percy continue dating, sharing more about themselves and becoming friends. Maddie reveals her father was cheating on his wife and family in New York City with her mother, so she and Maddie were left on their own, although he paid her off with some cash and the house. Both reveal that they never went to prom, so they imitate a prom night, going to a fancy dinner where Percy plays a rendition of "Maneater" on the piano. Afterward, he meets a school acquaintance, Natalie, who invites him to a Princeton orientation party.

After Percy and Maddie disagree about their long-term plans, he goes to the party, where Maddie eventually searches for him. She finds him with Natalie in bed, although nothing happened between them after he took an ibuprofen with alcohol. After leaving the party, Percy professes his love for Maddie, and Maddie says they should not have sex for the first time when he is drunk.

The next day, Percy tells his parents he wants to stay in Montauk with Maddie instead of going to Princeton. In a panic, his father offers her the car if she convinces him to go to Princeton. Percy overhears Maddie's deal with his parents. Feeling betrayed, Percy invites his parents and Maddie to dinner simultaneously and makes surreptitious remarks about the deal. He excuses himself and crashes the Buick into a tree, badly damaging it. When Percy returns, he tries to have sex with Maddie. After prematurely ejaculating during foreplay, he reveals he knows about the deal and ends their relationship.

Maddie takes the damaged car and determines to pay off her debts. Working for the rest of the summer, she saves enough money to save her home and fix her car. Maddie's friends Jim and Sara tell her they are moving from Montauk to Florida due to housing costs. Sara asks Maddie if she really wants to stay in Montauk or if she is just doing it for her mother.

After reflecting on her life, Maddie reunites with Percy at a Princeton mixer and apologizes. Unconvinced, he starts to drive off when she jumps on the hood of his car. Unable to see, Percy crashes the car into a barbecue, igniting her hoodie. He drives into the ocean to save her. The pair reconcile, promising to remain friends. Maddie sells Jim and Sara the house at low price, deciding to leave Montauk. Maddie adopts Milo, a former police dog, from the shelter where Percy volunteered. She drops Percy off at Princeton and promises to call him during her entire drive to her new life in California.

== Cast ==
- Jennifer Lawrence as Maddie Barker
- Andrew Barth Feldman as Percy Becker
- Laura Benanti as Allison Becker
- Matthew Broderick as Laird Becker
- Natalie Morales as Sara
- Scott MacArthur as Jim
- Ebon Moss-Bachrach as Gary
- Kyle Mooney as Jody
- Hasan Minhaj as Doug Khan
- Jordan Mendoza as Crispin
- Amalia Yoo as Natalie
- Alysia Joy Powell as Fern
- Quincy Dunn-Baker as Travis
- Matthew Noszka as hot guy from bar
- Zahn McClarnon as Gabe Sawyer, surfing lawyer
- Madison Odenborg as Melanie
- Achi Miller as Teen

== Production ==
=== Development ===
In October 2021, it was announced that Sony Pictures had won a highly competitive R-rated comedy package backed by producer-star Jennifer Lawrence with her production company Excellent Cadaver and director Gene Stupnitsky over studios Apple, Netflix, and Universal Pictures for a theatrical-exclusive release. Lawrence, Alex Saks, Marc Provissiero, Naomi Odenkirk, and Justine Polsky serve as producers while Stupnitsky co-wrote the screenplay with John Phillips. Its plot came from a real Craigslist ad sent to Stupnitsky by producers Provissiero and Odenkirk, with the former telling Lawrence about the story over dinner with her in mind for the role. In July 2022, it was reported that Sony would be moving forward with the film and engage in a theatrical release set for June 16, 2023.

=== Casting ===
In September 2022, Andrew Barth Feldman joined the cast as the male lead, while Laura Benanti and Matthew Broderick were cast as that character's parents along with Ebon Moss-Bachrach joining the cast. The following month, Natalie Morales and Scott MacArthur joined the cast.

=== Filming ===
Principal photography began in late September 2022 in various Nassau County locations in New York, such as Hempstead, Point Lookout, Lawrence, and Uniondale. Ted's Fishing Station located in Point Lookout was made to look like "Montauk Dock East". One month later, production shot scenes at the North Shore Animal League America in Port Washington. Filming for No Hard Feelings concluded that November.

=== Music ===
Mychael Danna and Jessica Rose Weiss composed the film score.

==== Track listing ====
No Hard Feelings (Original Motion Picture Soundtrack) track listing
No.	Title	Length
1.	"I Just Can't Decide"	2:11
2.	"Adopt a Do"	0:46
3.	"Keep Paddling"	4:14
4.	"Come On Up"	0:40
5.	"Guess We're Doin' This"	1:06
6.	"There's That Smile"	1:42
7.	"Skinny"	1:20
8.	"Maneater" (performed by Andrew Barth Feldman)	2:48
9.	"Doesn't Anyone Fuck Anymore?"	0:56
10.	"Finally Going to Prom"	1:33
11.	"I Still Love You"	0:54
12.	"I'd Like to Leave Please"	1:17
13.	"That'll Teach Her"	0:57
14.	"I Don't Have to Have Sex With Him?"	0:41
15.	"Was Any of It Real?"	1:32
16.	"Don't Get Too Excited"	1:53
17.	"You Have a Rich Dad"	0:43
18.	"Get Off the Hood"	1:20
19.	"Just Needed a Little Love"	1:46
20.	"Back to the Start" (performed by Cary Brothers)	3:27
Total length:		31:46

== Release ==
=== Theatrical ===
No Hard Feelings was released in the United States on June 23, 2023. It was initially scheduled to be released on June 16.

=== Home media ===
The film was released on digital formats, on August 15, 2023, with a DVD and Blu-ray following two weeks later.

=== Marketing ===
The marketing campaign for No Hard Feelings began on March 6, 2023, when stunt advertisements reading "Need a Car? 'Date' Our Son" were released on billboards and newsstands across the United States, as well as social platforms such as Instagram, Reddit and Facebook. A trailer for the film—which addresses the advertisements—was released to the public on March 9, 2023. On April 24, 2023, an official poster featuring Lawrence and Feldman was released.

== Reception ==
=== Box office ===
No Hard Feelings grossed $50.5 million in the United States and Canada, and $36.8 million in other territories, for a worldwide gross of $87.3 million. In the United States and Canada, No Hard Feelings was released alongside the wide expansion of Asteroid City, and was projected to gross around $12 million from 3,208 theaters in its opening weekend. The film made $6.25 million on its first day, including $2.15 million from Thursday night previews. It went on to slightly over-perform and debut to $15 million, finishing fourth. In its second weekend, the film made $7.9 million, and a total of $11.3 million over the five-day Independence Day weekend. Its 48% drop was considered "a very solid hold" in a post-COVID marketplace. It then made $5.4 million in its third weekend, finishing fifth.

On October 22, 2023, the film released on Netflix as a commercial success on the platform. According to Nielsen, it debuted at #1 as the most streamed title of the week during the week of October 23–29, with 1.1 billion minutes viewed. It was the only title to have over 1 billion minutes streamed that week on the Nielsen charts, with it attracting a broad, equal distribution of viewership across the 18-64 age demos, and Hispanic or African American viewers made up 30% of the viewership.

=== Critical response ===
On the review aggregator website Rotten Tomatoes, 70% of 226 critics' reviews are positive, with an average rating of 6.1/10. The website's consensus reads: "This raunchy comedy often plays it disappointingly safe, but Jennifer Lawrence's comedic and dramatic chops ensure that the end result prompts No Hard Feelings." Metacritic, which uses a weighted average, assigned the film a score of 59 out of 100, based on 50 critics, indicating "mixed or average" reviews. Audiences polled by CinemaScore gave the film an average grade of "B+" on an A+ to F scale, while PostTrak reported 84% of filmgoers gave it a positive score, with 59% saying they would definitely recommend it.

Critics opined the film is an enjoyable showcase for Lawrence's knack for physical comedy. The sequence where a naked Lawrence fights three teenagers on the beach garnered attention, with Decider writing "She fights dirty: Throwing sand in their faces, kicking their groins, and, eventually, pulling what can only be described as a pro-wrestler move in which she hoists one of the boys over her shoulders and slams him into the ground. Get it, Katniss! She takes some hits too, including a kick to her groin, but ultimately, her sheer deranged, naked ferocity is enough to scare the teens away."

Shirley Li of The Atlantic wrote, "Like the Risky Business copycats and hot-girl-meets-dweeby-dude romantic comedies that thrived in the aughts and early 2010s, No Hard Feelings offers some insight into the role that sex plays in the coming-of-age process, and how a perceived pressure to lose your virginity by some arbitrary deadline can remain a cross-generational burden. The film explores the difficulties of growing up, whether at 19 or 32, and the ways in which Maddie's and Percy's attitudes toward sex invite judgment about their levels of maturity." Writing for The Hollywood Reporter, Lovia Gyarkye said, "There's more to each of these characters than meets the eye. Stupnitsky dials down the intensity of the first act—with its sharp comedic timing and energetic slapstick—to make way for sweeter moments with Maddie and Percy." Tim Grierson of Screen Daily called the movie an uneven but thoughtful sentimental story about insecure characters with good hearts. Deadline Hollywood called it "a great start post-pandemic for a rare raunch comedy".

Before the film's release, some commentators accused No Hard Feelings of promoting sexual grooming. In an article for Bust, Carmella D'Acquisto commented on the film's trailer, writing, "take a moment to think about if this film would be made if the genders were reversed. Can you imagine pitching a film where a 32-year old man was paid to groom and coerce a 19-year-old woman into having sex that she doesn't want to have? No one would make that movie. But it's presented as funny and quirky when a grown woman does the manipulating."

In defense of the film in her review, Sophie Butcher of Empire wrote that the premise is supposed to be "icky" and that the film constantly addresses it: "Maddie is frequently confronted by the generational gap between her and Percy's peers, but her immaturity means she also often seems childlike by comparison." Feldman, who plays Percy, said in an interview, "The film never condones the things that Jennifer's character does or that my character's parents do. This is a movie about flawed people and it's a cringe comedy. You're meant to cringe! You're meant to sit with those uncomfortable feelings." He also said the film normalizes "wanting to find love and connection", not pressuring young men to have sexual relationships.

=== Accolades ===
For her performance in the film, Lawrence received a nomination in the category Best Actress – Motion Picture Comedy or Musical at the 81st Golden Globe Awards, and won the Comedy Movie Star of the Year award at the 49th People's Choice Awards. The film received a nomination for Best Comedy at the 29th Critics' Choice Awards. In its second Stunt Awards, Vulture in 2024 awarded No Hard Feelings (Note: The award is given to stunt coordinator John Cenatiempo, assistant stunt coordinator Alex Anagnostidis, director of photography Eigil Bryld, and performers Jennifer Lawrence, Abigail Hupp, Christopher Bailey, and Eason Rytter.) its "Best Stunt in a Non-Action Film" award for the sequence where a nude Jennifer Lawrence fights off three teenagers on the beach, writing that her character "approaches this sequence with the totally naked (literally) confidence of a no-longer-20-something hellion and executes it bluntly."
