= Andrew Barth Feldman =

American actor and singer (born 2002)

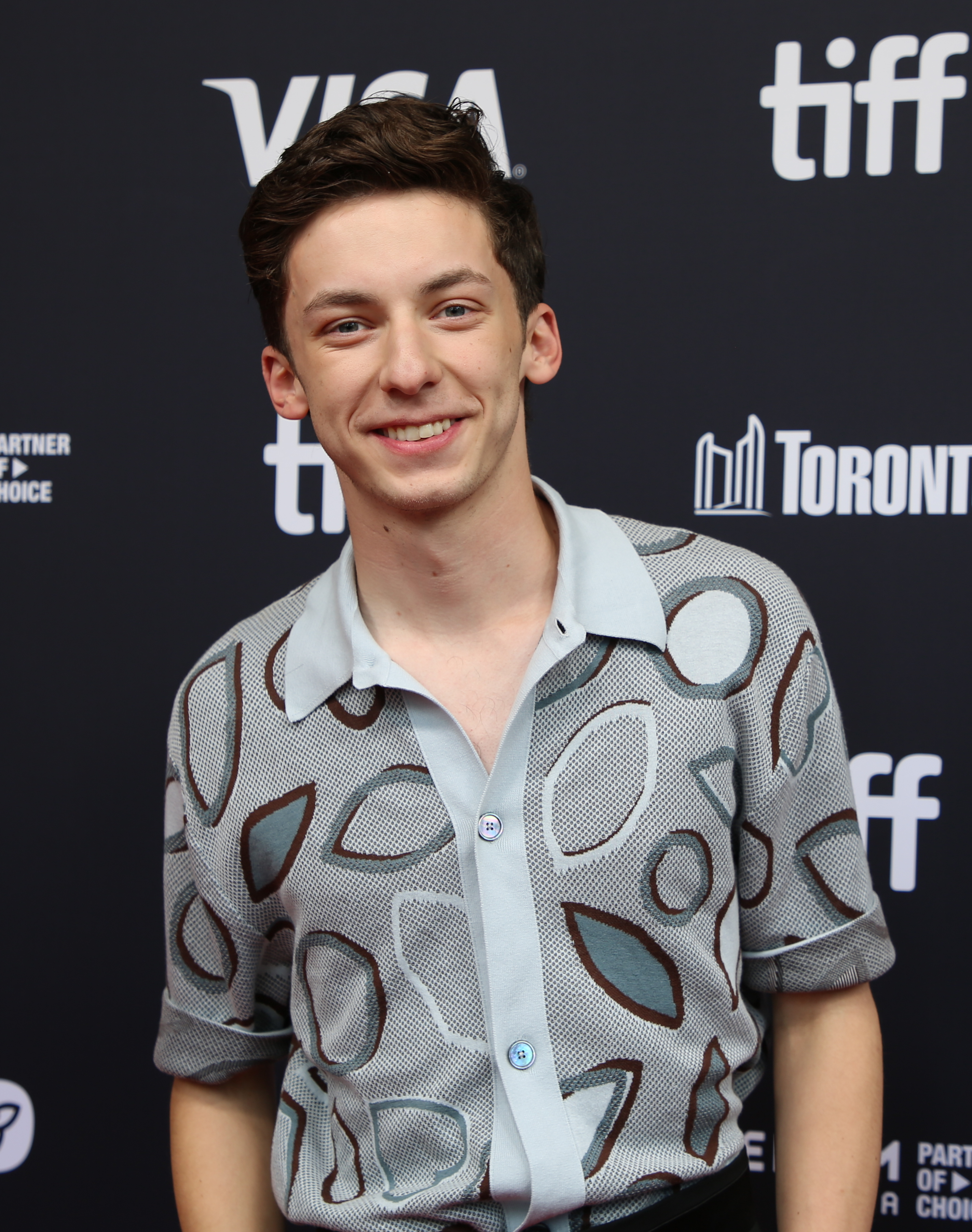
- Feldman in 2025
- Born: May 7, 2002 (age 24); Manhasset, New York, U.S.
- Education: Harvard University (did not graduate)
- Occupations: Actor; singer
- Years active: 2018–present
- Website: www.andrewbfeldman.com

Andrew Barth Feldman (born May 7, 2002) is an American actor and singer. He began his acting career in musical theater by participating in local productions as a child. Feldman won a Jimmy Award for his high school's production of the musical Catch Me If You Can in 2018. In 2019 he played the title role in the musical Dear Evan Hansen on Broadway.

Feldman had a guest role in the television musical series High School Musical: The Musical: The Series in 2021. He expanded to films in 2023 with a supporting role in A Tourist's Guide to Love and a leading role in No Hard Feelings. He voiced both Dopey and the narrator in Snow White (2025). In 2025, he starred in Maybe Happy Ending on Broadway.

== Early life and education ==
Feldman was born in 2002 in Manhasset, New York, to David Feldman and Barbara Barth. He was raised with an older sister in a Jewish family. Feldman became a fan of musical theater at an early age after watching a production of Beauty and the Beast at age three. He went on to star in local and school productions, including Annie, Grease, and Rent. He founded his own musical theater company in middle school, Zneefrock Productions, as part of his bar mitzvah project to raise money for autism research.

After taking time off from high school to star in Dear Evan Hansen, Feldman decided to attend Harvard University, starting in the fall of 2020, but he deferred his enrollment a year to 2021 because of the COVID-19 pandemic. In 2022, he took a semester off from Harvard when he booked the co-lead role in the film No Hard Feelings opposite Jennifer Lawrence.

== Career ==
=== Acting career ===
In 2018, his sophomore year of high school, Feldman portrayed Frank Abagnale Jr. in his high school's production of the musical Catch Me If You Can. After winning his regional awards program for this performance, he was invited to perform at the Jimmy Awards, where he won the award for best actor. Stacey Mindich, the lead producer of Dear Evan Hansen, saw his performance and asked him to audition for the role of Evan Hansen on Broadway. On January 30, 2019, at the age of 16, Feldman assumed the role of Evan Hansen, taking over for Taylor Trensch. His performance was lauded, with Sarah Bahr in the New York Times writing, "Andrew Barth Feldman made me forget where I was, who I was, that I was anything other than part of the world onstage...I'm pretty sure I didn't draw breath the entire first act." He left the show on January 26, 2020, after which Jordan Fisher took over the role.

During the pandemic he began a fundraiser for the Actor's Fund called "Broadway Jackbox" in March 2020, alongside former Dear Evan Hansen co-star Alex Boniello. This fundraiser streamed on Twitch with famous Broadway and screen actors each week. He additionally created a murder mystery series called Broadway Whodunit, starring Broadway and theatre actors. During his run in the show, he kept a Broadway.com vlog. He also maintains a YouTube channel under his name. He started his theatre company, Zneefrock Productions, to raise money for autism awareness. He can be heard playing himself in As the Curtain Rises, an original Broadway soap opera podcast from the Broadway Podcast Network.

Feldman starred as Alfredo Linguini in a benefit concert presentation of Ratatouille the Musical, an internet meme that originated on TikTok, inspired by the 2007 Disney/Pixar film. The concert streamed exclusively on TodayTix on January 1, 2021. His performance was celebrated, with Jesse Green writing in The New York Times that Feldman "seems to have animated his face to match Pixar's version: He's instantly adorable while looking like he still might gnaw your toe."

Feldman made his television acting debut in the Disney+ show High School Musical: The Musical: The Series as a recurring guest star in season 2 playing Antoine, a French exchange student.

On May 7, 2021, Feldman appeared in the short film Thespians by Casey Likes, a 2019 Jimmy Award finalist.

Feldman made his feature-film acting debut in April 2023 in Netflix's A Tourist's Guide to Love as Alex, a college-bound vlogger. He starred opposite Jennifer Lawrence in No Hard Feelings in June 2023 as Percy Becker, a soon-to-be college student who is also socially clueless.

He then played Neil Levy in the 2024 SNL biopic Saturday Night and voiced both Dopey and the narrator in Disney's 2025 live-action remake of Snow White.

Feldman starred as Oliver in Maybe Happy Ending opposite his offstage girlfriend, Helen J. Shen, for a nine-week engagement from September 2 to November 1, 2025. Asian theatre artists expressed disappointment over the casting of Feldman, a non-Asian actor, in a show set in Korea and in a role originated on Broadway by an actor of partly Asian descent, noting that Asian actors are underrepresented on American stages.

=== Music ===
On July 8, 2021, Feldman released his first single, "Every Pretty Girl", about falling in love as a teenager with OCD. Also in that month Feldman was featured on American actress and singer Cozi Zuehlsdorff's single "The Old Me and You". On September 23, 2022, Feldman and Joe Serafini released "In My Head", a duet by songwriters Daniel Mertzlufft and Jacob Ryan Smith, about the budding romance between two young men. On Christmas Eve 2021 Feldman released his second single "Emma".

== Filmography ==
=== Film ===
Year	Title	Role	Notes
2020	Ben Platt Live from Radio City Music Hall	Himself	Concert film; cameo
2022	White Noise	Student	
2023	A Tourist's Guide to Love	Alex	
2023	No Hard Feelings	Percy Becker	
2024	Saturday Night	Neil Levy	
2025	Snow White	Dopey / Narrator	Voice
2025	Poetic License	Sam Solomon	
2025	A Very Jonas Christmas Movie	Ethan	

=== Television ===
Year	Title	Role	Notes
2020	The 2020 Roger Rees Awards	Himself - Host	TV special
2020–2021	Stars in the House	Anthony, Himself	3 episodes
2021–2023	High School Musical: The Musical: The Series	Antoine	5 episodes

=== Stage ===
Year	Production	Role	Category/venue
2018	Catch Me If You Can	Frank Abagnale Jr.	Lawrence Woodmere Academy
2019–2020	Dear Evan Hansen	Evan Hansen	Music Box Theatre, Broadway
2020	SW: A New(sical) Hope	Han Solo/Darth Vader	54 Below concert
2021	Ratatouille the Musical	Alfredo Linguini	Benefit concert
2022	7 Sacrilege Street	Composer	Harvard Radcliffe Dramatic Club
2022	Park Map	Composer/Performer	54 Below concert
2023	Rent	Mark Cohen	John F. Kennedy Center for the Performing Arts
2024	Gutenberg! The Musical!	The Producer (One night cameo)	James Earl Jones Theatre, Broadway
2024	13	Evan Goldman	Lawrence Woodmere Academy concert
2024	Little Shop of Horrors	Seymour Krelborn	Westside Theatre, Off-Broadway
2025	We Had a World	Joshua	Manhattan Theatre Club, Off-Broadway
2025	Hello, Dolly!	Performer	Carnegie Hall concert
2025	Maybe Happy Ending	Oliver	Belasco Theatre, Broadway

=== Music video ===
Year	Title	Artist
2021	"Me and Mr. Popularity" (from In Pieces: A New Musical)	Joey Contreras

== Discography ==
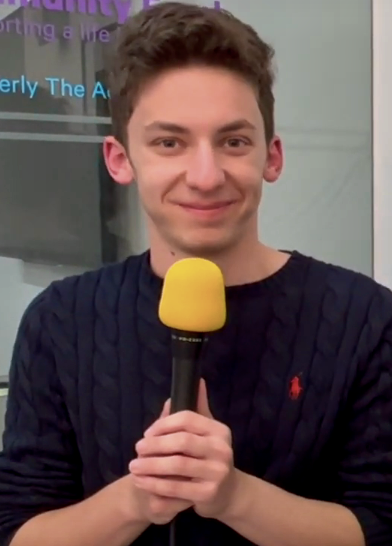
Feldman in 2023

=== Studio albums ===
Title	Details
Penn Station	Released: July 14, 2023; Label: G-Force; Formats: Digital download, streaming

=== Cast recordings ===
Title	Details
SW: A New(sical) Hope (Original Cast Recording) (with Adrian Dickson)	Released: November 3, 2017; Label: Zneefrock Productions; Formats: Digital download, streaming

=== Singles ===
Title	Year	Album
"Every Pretty Girl"	2021	Non-album singles
"Emma"	2022	Non-album singles
"The College Breakup"	2023	Non-album singles

=== Featured singles ===
Title	Year	Album
"Me and Mr. Popularity"	2021	In Pieces: A New Musical (Highlights)
"The Old Me & You" (Cozi Zuehlsdorff featuring Andrew Barth Feldman)	2021	Non-album single
"Archie's All-American" (Joe Iconis & Family featuring Andrew Barth Feldman)	2022	Album
"Second Star" (with Ben Ward)	2022	Non-album single
"In My Head" (Smith & Mertzlufft featuring Andrew Barth Feldman and Joe Serafini)	2022	Non-album single
"Popular" (Third Reprise featuring Andrew Barth Feldman)	2023	Non-album single

=== Guest appearances ===
Title	Year	Album
"Maneater" (Live)	2023	No Hard Feelings (Original Motion Picture Soundtrack)

== Awards ==
Year	Awards	Category	Work	Result
2018	Roger Rees Awards	Best Actor	Catch Me If You Can	Won
2018	National High School Musical Theatre Awards	Best Actor	Catch Me If You Can	Won
2019	Broadway.com Audience Choice Awards	Favorite Replacement	Dear Evan Hansen	Nominated
2019	Broadway.com Star of the Year	Star of the Year	Dear Evan Hansen	Nominated
2021	New York Emmy Awards	Education/Schools – Long Form Content	Roger Rees Awards	Won
2022	BroadwayWorld Cabaret Awards	Best Show	Park Map	Won
