= You Will Be Found =

Song from Dear Evan Hansen

Song by Ben Platt, Kristolyn Lloyd, Will Roland, Laura Dreyfuss & Original Broadway Cast of Dear Evan Hansen

from the album Dear Evan Hansen: Original Broadway Cast Recording
- Released: January 27, 2017
- Genre: Show tune
- Length: 6:01
- Songwriter: Pasek & Paul

Audio
- "You Will Be Found" on YouTube

"You Will Be Found" is the Act 1 finale of the 2015 musical Dear Evan Hansen, which premiered on Broadway in 2016. Benj Pasek and Justin Paul wrote both the music and lyrics to the song.

== Synopsis ==
The song begins during the Kickoff Assembly for The Connor Project, a student organization that the musical's protagonist, Evan Hansen had formed, with help from Jared Kleinman and Alana Beck, in order to keep the memory of a fellow student, Connor Murphy (whose suicide sets off the events in the musical) alive. Evan, at first, gives a speech on the stage of his high school's auditorium. After fumbling through his note cards mid-speech, he begins to have a panic attack and sits on the ground as his anxiety takes over. He takes a deep breath, stands up, starts over and gives a new speech, this time through song. While knowing that he has been lying all this time, his speech presents a message of hope to those in attendance. After the first chorus, it's revealed that an audience attendee videotaped the speech and put it up online. As the song builds up into an uplifting climax, it goes viral, the entire public believing and consuming Evan's lies in the process. The song returns in Act 2 as a much darker-toned reprise underscoring Alana putting Evan's note (believed to have been Connor's suicide note) online, which gets immediate backlash on social media.

== Background ==
The song was written for the musical's Off-Broadway production at Second Stage Theater in 2016, replacing "Part of Me", which originally closed Act 1 in the world premiere production at Washington D.C.'s Arena Stage in 2015. The latter song was featured as a bonus track on the deluxe edition of the show's Original Broadway Cast Recording. After the show premiered on Broadway, Pasek and Paul were surprised to see how far "You Will Be Found" had gone outside of the show's context to resonate with audiences, especially during the COVID-19 pandemic. Benj Pasek explained this by saying that it was "In part because it's a speech that Evan is giving to his classmates, an idealized version of how he wants to feel, the lyrics had a chance to resonate beyond the story—we realized people all over the world were using it as a means of finding connection and hope in challenging times."

== Reception ==
In his review of the Broadway production of the musical for The New York Times, Charles Isherwood called it the show's most memorable song, and a "soaring anthem" that "becomes one of the rallying cries for the social media movement that the death of Connor — and Evan's speech about him — incites."

== Certifications ==
Region	Certification	Certified units/sales
United Kingdom (BPI)	Silver	200,000^{‡}
United States (RIAA)	Gold	500,000^{‡}
^{‡} Sales+streaming figures based on certification alone.

== Book adaptation ==
Pasek and Paul adapted the song into a picture book released by Little, Brown and Company on March 17, 2020, with illustrations by Sarah J. Coleman.

== 2021 film version ==
"You Will Be Found"

Song by Ben Platt, Amandla Stenberg, Liz Kate, DeMarius Copes, Isaac Powell, Hadiya Eshe', Kaitlyn Dever and Dear Evan Hansen Choir

from the album Dear Evan Hansen: Original Motion Picture Soundtrack
- Released: September 24, 2021
- Recorded: 2020
- Length: 5:58
- Label: Interscope
- Songwriter: Pasek & Paul
- Producers: Alex Lacamoire; Dan Romer; Pasek & Paul

Ben Platt singles chronology
"Waving Through a Window" (2021)	"You Will Be Found" (2021)	"Only Us" (2021)

Audio
- "You Will Be Found" (2021 film version) on YouTube

"You Will Be Found" was featured in Universal Pictures' 2021 film adaptation of the musical, starring Ben Platt, who reprised his performance in the titular role. The film, which premiered at the 2021 Toronto International Film Festival on September 9, 2021, followed by a theatrical release on September 24, 2021, is directed by Stephen Chbosky from a screenplay by the musical's librettist Steven Levenson, who also serves as an executive producer with Michael Bederman, Pasek & Paul and the show's lead producer Stacey Mindich. Ben's father Marc Platt and Adam Siegel serve as producers. In the film, while the song and who sings which lyrics remain the same, Jared's parts of the song were given to some of the film's new characters: Gemma (Liz Kate), Oliver (DeMarius Copes), Rhys (Isaac Powell) and Cherise (Hadiya Eshe'). The song's Act 2 reprise was cut from this film and replaced by a reprise of "The Anonymous Ones," one of the two new songs written for the film, sung by Alana as she puts Evan's letter on social media.

A remixed version of this film's rendition of the song was used to underscore its first trailer, which was released online on May 18, 2021. Platt also performed a solo version of the song on Season 16 of NBC's America's Got Talent to promote the film.

The film version of the song was made available as an exclusive download from the soundtrack album on August 26, 2021, alongside "Waving Through a Window". The album was released on September 24, 2021, the same day as the film.

== Sam Smith and Summer Walker version ==
"You Will Be Found"

Single by Sam Smith and Summer Walker

from the album Dear Evan Hansen: Original Motion Picture Soundtrack
- Released: September 24, 2021
- Recorded: 2020
- Length: 3:57
- Label: Interscope
- Songwriter: Pasek & Paul

Sam Smith singles chronology
"The Lighthouse Keeper" (2020)	"You Will Be Found" (2021)	"Love Me More" (2022)

Summer Walker singles chronology
"Bullshit" (2021)	"You Will Be Found" (2021)	"Ex for a Reason" (2021)

Music video
- "You Will Be Found" (Sam Smith/Summer Walker version) on YouTube

The English singer Sam Smith and American singer Summer Walker also covered the song for the soundtrack album of the 2021 film adaptation. This version was released as a single on September 17, 2021, and plays during the closing credits of the film itself.

=== Music video ===
A music video of their version, featuring the various locations the film used for filming, was released on September 24, 2021.

=== Charts ===
Chart performance for "You Will Be Found" (Sam Smith and Summer Walker version)
Chart (2021)	Peak position
New Zealand Hot Singles (RMNZ)	28

== Cover versions ==
- In 2016, a few months before the musical opened on Broadway, Cynthia Erivo performed the song with Pasek and Paul at the 2nd Annual Elsie Fest.
- In 2017, BYU Vocal Point released a music video cover of the song, which was viewed over 5 million times on YouTube as of 2021.
- In 2017, the song was parodied as part of "Broadway Bound", the opening number of the 71st Tony Awards, which began with host Kevin Spacey dressed in Evan Hansen's iconic blue-striped polo and arm cast.
- In 2017, a cover of the song by Thomas Sanders, Robyn Adele Anderson and Von Smith was released on YouTube.
- In 2017, the One Voice Children's Choir released an anti-bullying video set to their rendition of the song.
- In 2018, Ben Platt and Lin-Manuel Miranda recorded a charity single mash-up of this song and "The Story of Tonight" from Hamilton, entitled "Found/Tonight", with the proceeds partially donated to the March for Our Lives anti-gun violence movement.
- In 2018, Utah-based and family-owned production company Working with Lemons released a cinematic music video of the song, featuring Porter Bagley as Evan Hansen.
  - This version was used in 2019 on Season 14 of NBC's America's Got Talent to underscore Heidi Klum using her golden buzzer to send 12-year-old Luke Islam to the live shows, where he would eventually perform the song himself during the Quarterfinals.
- In 2018, Peter Hollens recorded an a cappella medley of this song and two other songs from the musical, "Waving Through a Window" and "For Forever", and released it on YouTube.
  - He would revisit the song in 2020 when he released a separate a cappella cover of the song on YouTube.
- In 2019, The Bostonians recorded the song for their album, Dropping a Hat.
- In 2020, Jim Brickman recorded the song as the lead single of his Broadway album, Brickman on Broadway.
- In 2020, internet personality Nick Pitera released an a cappella cover of the song.
- In 2020, Voctave recorded the song for their album, The Corner of Broadway and Main Street, Vol. 2.
- In 2020, actor Hugh Jackman posted a video of himself singing the song while social distancing at home on Twitter.
- In 2021, the song was performed as the finale of that year's virtual edition of Broadway Backwards. This version was performed by Jenn Colella, Jay Armstrong Johnson, Amy Adams (who plays Cynthia Murphy in the 2021 film adaptation), James Monroe Iglehart, Cheyenne Jackson, L Morgan Lee, Raymond J. Lee, Telly Leung, Eric McCormack, Debra Messing, Ruthie Ann Miles, Brian Stokes Mitchell, Jessie Mueller, Kelli O'Hara, Karen Olivo, Bernadette Peters and Elizabeth Stanley.
- In 2021, Mat and Savanna Shaw covered the song for their album, Stand by Me.
- In 2021, Jennifer Nettles recorded the song for her album, Always Like New.
- In 2021, the Northwell Health Nurse Choir performed the song during Season 16 of America's Got Talent.
- In 2021, Joshua Vacanti performed the song during Season 21 of The Voice.
- In 2022, Natalie Grant and Cory Asbury collaborated on a cover of the song based on Sam Smith and Summer Walker's version and released it as a single.
