= Michael Aarons =

American guitarist and music coordinator

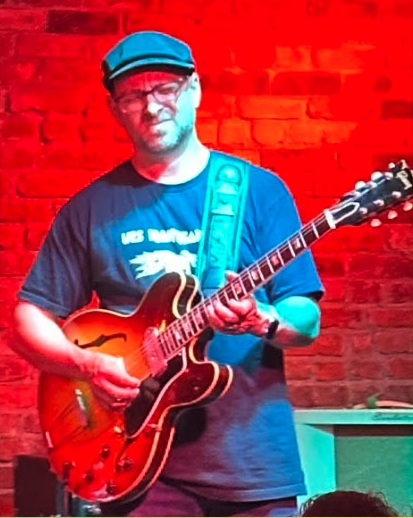
- Aarons in 2023
- Born: Washington, D.C., U.S.
- Education: Duke Ellington School of the Arts; Manhattan School of Music (BM, 1998)
- Occupations: Guitarist; music coordinator
- Years active: 1990s–present
- Website: m2music.nyc

Michael Aarons is an American guitarist and music coordinator based in New York City. He owns M² Music, a music-coordination and contracting firm that staffs orchestras and handles payroll for Broadway theatre productions, touring companies, and recording sessions.

Aarons began playing the guitar in Broadway pit orchestras in 2004, including Memphis, Green Day's American Idiot, and Kinky Boots. In the mid-2010s he moved into music coordination as an associate of the Broadway music coordinator Michael Keller. His music-coordination credits include Hamilton, Dear Evan Hansen, Moulin Rouge! The Musical, Frozen, and Sunset Boulevard, along with more than twenty North American touring productions. In 2026 he was among the honorees at Broadway Salutes, an annual event recognizing 25, 35, and 50 or more years of work on Broadway.

== Early life and education ==
Aarons was born and raised in Washington, D.C. He attended the Duke Ellington School of the Arts. In 1994 he moved to New York City to study at the Manhattan School of Music, earning a 1998 Bachelor of Music degree.

== Career ==
=== Guitarist ===
Aarons's first Broadway credit was as guitarist for Laugh Whore, the Mario Cantone solo show that opened in October 2004. He went on to play guitar in the pit for High Fidelity (2006), Grease (2007), 9 to 5 and Memphis (both 2009), Green Day's American Idiot (2010), Baby It's You! and Godspell (both 2011), Evita (2012), Kinky Boots (2013), and Frozen (2018), and he wrote additional guitar arrangements for Next to Normal.

He has also worked as a session guitarist, including on Liza Minnelli's 2002 album Liza's Back and Michael Giacchino's score for Incredibles 2 (2018). He released the jazz album Not By Coincidence in 2002, plays in the organ trio Aarons, Finland & Rose, which released a self-titled album in 2023, and has recorded with Michael Olatuja and Russ Anixter's Hippie Big Band.

=== Music coordination ===
A music coordinator, sometimes called a music contractor, assembles a production's orchestra and manages the musicians' scheduling, contracts, and pay.

Aarons's first documented coordination credit is the Atlantic Theater Company's 2014 off-Broadway revival of The Threepenny Opera. On Broadway he was associate music coordinator for Honeymoon in Vegas and Amazing Grace (both 2015), and then music coordinator for Hamilton, School of Rock, and The Color Purple later that year; the billing was shared with Keller through 2018.

He has since coordinated Broadway orchestras for Dear Evan Hansen (2016), Anastasia (2017), Frozen (2018), Moulin Rouge! The Musical and Jagged Little Pill (both 2019), & Juliet (2022), Sunset Boulevard (2024), and Schmigadoon! and The Rocky Horror Show (both 2026), and he took over as music coordinator for Aladdin in 2023.

Off-Broadway, Aarons's work began in 2014 with The Threepenny Opera and Found at the Atlantic Theater Company, and he has since worked for The Public Theater, Second Stage Theater, Classic Stage Company, MCC Theater, the Westside Theatre revival of Little Shop of Horrors, and the Perelman Performing Arts Center. His touring credits include four North American companies of Hamilton and tours of Dear Evan Hansen, Frozen, Moulin Rouge! The Musical, & Juliet, Disney's Beauty and the Beast, and Dirty Dancing: The Musical. He was also music coordinator for the thirty-piece orchestra that recorded a new arrangement of the South Park theme in 2022.

=== M² Music ===
M² Music, also credited as M-Squared Music, staffs orchestras for Broadway productions, touring productions, recording and scoring sessions, and live events, and acts as an employer of record and paymaster for the musicians it engages. According to the company, Aarons and Keller formed it in 2014; Aarons is its owner. It has acted as music coordinator on Broadway productions from & Juliet in 2022 onward.

=== Production and composing ===
Aarons founded the production company Hybrid Music Productions in 2004 and has written music for television, including the co-written theme song for the Style Network series How Do I Look?

== Broadway credits ==
=== Music coordination ===
The following Broadway music-coordination credits are documented by the Internet Broadway Database and the Playbill Vault.

Year	Production	Theatre	Credit
2026	The Rocky Horror Show	Studio 54	Music coordinator
2026	Beaches	Majestic Theatre	Music coordinator
2026	Schmigadoon!	Nederlander Theatre	Music coordinator
2025	All Out: Comedy About Ambition	Nederlander Theatre	Music coordinator
2025	Mamma Mia! (return engagement)	Winter Garden Theatre	Music coordinator
2025	Real Women Have Curves: The Musical	James Earl Jones Theatre	Music coordinator
2025	Pirates! The Penzance Musical	Todd Haimes Theatre	Music coordinator
2025	Smash	Imperial Theatre	Music coordinator
2025	Stephen Sondheim's Old Friends	Samuel J. Friedman Theatre	Music coordinator
2025	Boop! The Musical	Broadhurst Theatre	Music coordinator
2025	Trisha Paytas' Big Broadway Dream	St. James Theatre	Music coordinator
2024	All In: Comedy About Love	Hudson Theatre	Music coordinator
2024	Swept Away	Longacre Theatre	Music coordinator
2024	Elf	Marquis Theatre	Music coordinator
2024	Tammy Faye	Palace Theatre	Music coordinator
2024	Sunset Boulevard	St. James Theatre	Music coordinator
2024	The Heart of Rock and Roll	James Earl Jones Theatre	Music coordinator
2024	The Wiz	Marquis Theatre	Music coordinator
2023	How to Dance in Ohio	Belasco Theatre	Music coordinator
2023	Harmony	Ethel Barrymore Theatre	Music coordinator
2022	& Juliet	Stephen Sondheim Theatre	Music coordinator
2021	Freestyle Love Supreme	Booth Theatre	Music coordinator
2021	Flying Over Sunset	Vivian Beaumont Theater	Music coordinator
2021	Diana, The Musical	Longacre Theatre	Music coordinator
2019	Jagged Little Pill	Broadhurst Theatre	Music coordinator
2019	Moulin Rouge! The Musical	Al Hirschfeld Theatre	Music coordinator
2019	Be More Chill	Lyceum Theatre	Music coordinator
2018	Ruben & Clay's First Annual Christmas Carol Family Fun Pageant Spectacular Reunion Show	Imperial Theatre	Music coordinator
2018	Pretty Woman: The Musical	Nederlander Theatre	Music coordinator
2018	Head Over Heels	Hudson Theatre	Music coordinator
2018	Frozen	St. James Theatre	Co-music coordinator
2018	Escape to Margaritaville	Marquis Theatre	Co-music coordinator
2017	SpongeBob SquarePants	Palace Theatre	Music coordinator
2017	Prince of Broadway	Samuel J. Friedman Theatre	Music coordinator
2017	Anastasia	Broadhurst Theatre	Music coordinator
2017	War Paint	Nederlander Theatre	Music coordinator
2016	Dear Evan Hansen	Music Box Theatre	Music coordinator
2015	The Color Purple	Bernard B. Jacobs Theatre	Music coordinator
2015	School of Rock – The Musical	Winter Garden Theatre	Music coordinator
2015	Hamilton	Richard Rodgers Theatre	Music coordinator
2015	Amazing Grace	Nederlander Theatre	Associate music coordinator
2015	Honeymoon in Vegas	Nederlander Theatre	Associate music coordinator
2014	Aladdin	New Amsterdam Theatre	Replacement music coordinator (from 2023)

=== Musician ===
The following Broadway performer credits are documented by the Internet Broadway Database.

Year	Production	Theatre	Instrument / Role
2018	Frozen	St. James Theatre	Guitars; octave mandolin
2013	Kinky Boots	Al Hirschfeld Theatre	Guitar
2012	Evita	Marquis Theatre	Guitar
2011	Godspell	Circle in the Square Theatre	Guitars
2011	Baby It's You!	Broadhurst Theatre	Guitar
2010	Green Day's American Idiot	St. James Theatre	Guitar 1
2009	Memphis	Shubert Theatre	Guitars
2009	9 to 5: The Musical	Marquis Theatre	Guitars
2009	Next to Normal	Booth Theatre	Additional guitar arrangements
2007	Grease	Brooks Atkinson Theatre	Guitars
2006	High Fidelity	Imperial Theatre	Guitars; sitar; banjo; mandolin
2004	Laugh Whore (with Mario Cantone)	Cort Theatre	Guitar

== Off-Broadway credits ==
The following Off-Broadway credits are documented by the Lucille Lortel Theatre's Internet Off-Broadway Database, now hosted on Spectra, except where otherwise noted.

Year	Production	Theatre	Company	Credit
2026	Giulia: The Poison Queen of Palermo	Perelman Performing Arts Center	Perelman Performing Arts Center	Music coordinator
2025	A Christmas Carol	Mike Nichols Theater, Perelman Performing Arts Center	Perelman Performing Arts Center	Music coordinator
2022	Only Gold	Susan and Ronald Frankel Theater	MCC Theater	Music coordinator
2022	Kinky Boots	Stage 42		Music coordinator
2022	Space Dogs	Susan and Ronald Frankel Theater	MCC Theater	Music coordinator
2019	The Wrong Man	Newman Mills Theater	MCC Theater	Music coordinator
2019	Little Shop of Horrors	Westside Theatre (Upstairs)		Music coordinator
2019	Superhero	Tony Kiser Theater	Second Stage Theater	Music coordinator
2018	Carmen Jones	Lynn F. Angelson Theater	Classic Stage Company	Music coordinator
2018	Miss You Like Hell	Newman Theater, Joseph Papp Public Theater	The Public Theater	Music coordinator
2017	Hamlet	Anspacher Theater, Joseph Papp Public Theater	The Public Theater	Music coordinator
2017	Joan of Arc: Into the Fire	Newman Theater, Joseph Papp Public Theater	The Public Theater	Music coordinator
2015	Cymbeline	Delacorte Theater	The Public Theater (Free Shakespeare in the Park)	Music contractor
2014	Found	Linda Gross Theater	Atlantic Theater Company	Music coordinator
2014	The Threepenny Opera	Linda Gross Theater	Atlantic Theater Company	Music coordinator
2008	Next to Normal	Second Stage Theatre	Second Stage Theater	Guitar

== National tours and sit-down productions ==
The following touring credits are documented by the Internet Broadway Database.

Opened	Production	Credit
2026	Dirty Dancing: The Musical	Music coordinator
2025	Disney's Beauty and the Beast	Music coordinator
2025	The Wiz	Music coordinator
2024	& Juliet	Music coordinator
2023	Mamma Mia!	Music coordinator
2023	Company	Music coordinator
2023	The Wiz (pre-Broadway tour)	Music coordinator
2022	Aladdin	Replacement music coordinator
2022	Jagged Little Pill	Music coordinator
2022	Moulin Rouge! The Musical	Music coordinator
2021	Pretty Woman: The Musical	Music coordinator
2019	Frozen	Music coordinator
2019	Hamilton (And Peggy company)	Music coordinator
2018	Hamilton (Philip company)	Music coordinator
2018	Anastasia	Music coordinator
2018	Dear Evan Hansen	Music coordinator
2017	Hamilton (Angelica company)	Music coordinator
2017	Escape to Margaritaville (pre-Broadway tour)	Music coordinator
2016	Hamilton (Eliza company, Chicago)	Music coordinator
2015	The Bridges of Madison County	Music coordinator
2015	If/Then	Associate music coordinator
2014	Kinky Boots	Associate music coordinator
2010	Next to Normal	Additional guitar arrangements

== Selected discography ==
Recording credits are documented by AllMusic except where another source is cited.

Year	Title	Primary artist / production	Role
2023	Aarons, Finland & Rose	Aarons, Finland & Rose	Guitar; composer
2022	& Juliet (Original Broadway Cast Recording)	Broadway Cast	Music coordinator
2021	Diana: The Musical (Original Broadway Cast Recording)	Broadway Cast	Guitar
2021	Bill	William Shatner	Strings contractor
2020	Lagos Pepper Soup	Michael Olatuja	Guitar
2019	Jagged Little Pill (Original Broadway Cast Recording)	Broadway Cast	Guitar; music coordinator
2018	Incredibles 2 (Original Motion Picture Soundtrack)	Michael Giacchino	Guitar
2018	Frozen: The Broadway Musical (Original Broadway Cast Recording)	Broadway Cast	Guitar; octave mandolin; music coordinator
2018	Jesus Christ Superstar Live in Concert	Original television cast	Music coordinator
2017	Dear Evan Hansen (Original Broadway Cast Recording)	Broadway Cast	Music coordinator
2017	SpongeBob SquarePants: The New Musical (Original Cast Recording)	Broadway Cast	Guitar; banjo; ukulele
2016	The Color Purple (New Broadway Cast Recording)	Broadway Cast	Music coordinator
2016	Dangerous Woman	Ariana Grande	Guitar
2015	Hamilton: An American Musical (Original Broadway Cast Recording)	Lin-Manuel Miranda	Music coordinator
2015	School of Rock – The Musical (Original Broadway Cast Recording)	Broadway Cast	Music coordinator
2013	Musical Gifts from Joshua Bell and Friends	Joshua Bell	Guitar
2012	Songs	Plácido Domingo	Guitar
2009	Next to Normal (Original Broadway Cast Recording)	Broadway Cast	Acoustic guitar; electric guitar
2007	High Fidelity: A Musical (Original Cast Recording)	Broadway Cast	Guitar; banjo; mandolin; sitar
2002	Not By Coincidence	The Michael Aarons Group	Guitar; composer
2002	Liza's Back	Liza Minnelli	Guitar

== Film and television ==
Year	Title	Medium	Role
2023	Up Here	TV series	Music contractor
2022	South Park	TV series; orchestral theme recording	Music coordinator
2021	Annie Live!	TV special	Music coordinator
2021	Diana: The Musical	Filmed stage production	Music coordinator; guitar
2021	Here Today	Film	Music coordinator
2020	Hamilton	Filmed stage production	Music coordinator
2020	We Are Freestyle Love Supreme	Documentary film	Music coordinator
2018	Incredibles 2	Film	Guitarist; music coordinator
2018	Jesus Christ Superstar Live in Concert	TV special	Music coordinator
2014	Lucky Stiff	Film	Guitarist
c. 2010	How Do I Look?	TV series (Style Network); theme song	Co-writer
