= Almost Like Praying =

2017 single by Lin-Manuel Miranda

Single by Lin-Manuel Miranda featuring Artists for Puerto Rico
- Released: October 6, 2017
- Studio: Atlantic Studios (New York, NY); Glenwood Place Studios (Burbank, CA); The Village Recorder (Los Angeles, CA); Circle House (Miami, FL)
- Genre: Latin pop; reggaeton
- Length: 3:21
- Label: Atlantic
- Songwriter: Lin-Manuel Miranda
- Producer: Trooko

Lin-Manuel Miranda singles chronology
"What the World Needs Now Is Love" (2016)	"Almost Like Praying" (2017)	"Found/Tonight" (2018)

Music videos
- "Almost Like Praying" on YouTube
- "Almost Like Praying" (Salsa Remix) on YouTube

"Almost Like Praying" is a song written by Lin-Manuel Miranda and recorded by him and numerous other artists under the collective name Artists for Puerto Rico. The song was released on October 6, 2017, by Atlantic Records to support relief efforts in Puerto Rico in response to Hurricane Maria, which struck the island in September 2017. Proceeds from the song are to be donated to the victims and survivors of the hurricane. The song debuted at number 20 on the Billboard Hot 100 and number one on the Billboard Digital Songs Sales chart, selling 111,000 downloads and achieving 5.2 million streams in its first week of availability in the US. On February 8, 2018, a salsa remix of the song was released.

== Background ==
"Almost Like Praying" is a song conceived by Hamilton creator and star Lin-Manuel Miranda. Miranda, who is from New York but of Puerto Rican descent, has publicly described the song as "a love letter to Puerto Rico." Growing up, Miranda spent a month every summer in Puerto Rico visiting family. He had family there during Hurricane Maria.

The song is composed of a compilation of names of all 78 municipalities of Puerto Rico, including prominent areas such as Old San Juan, sung by numerous artists such as Jennifer Lopez, Camila Cabello, Gloria Estefan, Fat Joe, and Marc Anthony. It samples the song "Maria" from West Side Story, from which the song line "say it [Maria] soft, and it's almost like praying" is used and titled after. Other artists on the song include Rubén Blades, Pedro Capó, Dessa, Luis Fonsi, Juan Luis Guerra, Alex Lacamoire, John Leguizamo, Lin-Manuel Miranda, Rita Moreno, Ednita Nazario, Joell Ortiz, Anthony Ramos, Gina Rodriguez, Gilberto Santa Rosa, PJ Sin Suela, Ana Villafañe and Tommy Torres. The sound of the Puerto Rican coquí frog can be heard at the beginning and the end of the song. Proceeds from the song are donated in full to the Hispanic Federation's UNIDOS Disaster Relief and Recovery Program, destined for the victims and survivors of the hurricane on the Isle of Puerto Rico.

According to Lin-Manuel Miranda, he included all 78 towns of Puerto Rico "so that no one feels left out and no one's town feels forgotten."

== Charts ==
=== Weekly charts ===
Chart (2017)	Peak position
Scottish Singles Sales (Official Charts)	88
US Billboard Hot 100	20
US Hot Latin Songs (Billboard)	3

=== Year-end charts ===
Chart (2017)	Position
US Hot Latin Songs (Billboard)	63

== See also ==
- Effects of Hurricane Maria in Puerto Rico
