= Taylor Trensch =

American stage and film actor (born 1989)

- Born: Taylor Hunt Trensch; May 3, 1989 (age 37); Tampa, Florida, U.S.
- Education: Elon University
- Occupation: Actor
- Years active: 2008–present

Taylor Hunt Trensch (born May 3, 1989) is an American stage and film actor.

== Early life and education ==
Trensch was born in Tampa, Florida.

He attended Howard W. Blake High School where he studied theatre under Eric Davis, James Rayfield, and Jennie Eisenhower. During his senior year, Trensch was awarded a college scholarship from the Florida State Thespian Society. Trensch graduated in 2007.

He was then accepted to Elon University's musical theatre program and attended for two years.

== Career ==
In the summer of 2008 Trensch joined the acting company at the Lake Dillon Theatre in Silverthorne, Colorado. He performed The Rocky Horror Show, Little Shop of Horrors, Into the Woods, Cabaret, and Rabbit Hole in repertory.

In 2009, during his second year at Elon University, Trensch was cast as Moritz Stiefel in the first national tour of Spring Awakening. For his portrayal of Moritz, Trensch won the 2009 Denver Post Ovation Award for Best Supporting Actor in a National Touring Production as well as the Best Individual Performance honor from BroadwayWorld.

Trensch then appeared as Dwayne Hoover in the world premiere of William Finn and James Lapine's Little Miss Sunshine at the La Jolla Playhouse Mandell Weiss Theatre in early 2011.

Trensch made his Broadway debut as Boq in Wicked on January 24, 2012, temporarily replacing Etai Benson. The role was offered to him after auditioning for Pasek and Paul's musical Dogfight, which was also being directed by Wicked helmer Joe Mantello.

He performed in the off-Broadway revivals of Rent (as Gordon, Waiter, and others) and Bare (as Peter) at New World Stages shortly thereafter. That same year, Trensch read the role of Jack in a developmental workshop for the film adaptation of Into the Woods.

On April 11, 2013, he opened the Broadway transfer of the Royal Shakespeare Company's Matilda the Musical as Michael Wormwood and remained in the role through June 8. 2014.

Trensch played the lead role of Christopher Boone, sharing the role with Alex Sharp, in the original Broadway production of The Curious Incident of the Dog in the Night-Time. It opened at the Ethel Barrymore Theatre on October 5, 2014, and he continued in the role until September 12, 2015.

In January 2016 Trensch acted in the world premiere of Samuel D. Hunter's Clarkston at the Dallas Theatre Center. Then, In July, he performed the role of Tyler Clementi in the world premiere of Craig Carnelia and Joe Tracz's Poster Boy at the Williamstown Theatre Festival.

Trensch was cast as Barnaby Tucker in the Broadway revival of Hello, Dolly! that began previews March 15, 2017, and opened on April 20 at the Shubert Theatre. He left the show on January 14, 2018, along with fellow co-stars Bette Midler, David Hyde Pierce, and Beanie Feldstein.

On February 6, 2018, Trensch took over the titular role in Dear Evan Hansen at the Music Box Theatre on Broadway. He left the production after a year and was replaced by Andrew Barth Feldman.

From November 5, 2019, until the Broadway shutdown on March 12, 2020, Trensch appeared opposite Ed Harris in To Kill a Mockingbird as Dill Harris. It was his third Broadway show at the Shubert Theatre.

Trensch stepped into the role of Mordred in the Lincoln Center revival of Camelot, reuniting with Bartlett Sher and Aaron Sorkin. It opened on April 13, 2023, at the Vivian Beaumont Theatre and also starred Andrew Burnap, Phillipa Soo, and Jordan Donica. The show closed on July 23, 2023.

Trensch originated the role of Kenneth Calloway in the musical adaptation of Safety Not Guaranteed, which opened at Brooklyn Academy of Music's Harvey Theatre on September 17, 2024, for a limited run through October 20.

On television, Trensch has guest starred on Evil and Law & Order: Special Victims Unit in addition to voicing characters for Nickelodeon's Nella the Princess Knight and Netflix's Archibald's Next Big Thing. He has also played supporting roles in the independent features Things Like This and Your Monster.

Trensch joined the cast the Broadway debut of Floyd Collins as Skeets Miller at the Lincoln Center Theater's Vivan Beaumont Theater. Performances began March 27, 2025, and the show opened on April 21. For his performance, Trensch received a nomination for the Tony Award for Best Featured Actor in a Musical.

== Personal life ==
Trensch is gay.

== Theatre credits ==
Year	Title	Role	Theatre	Ref.
2008	Cabaret	Victor	Lake Dillon Theatre	
2008	The Rocky Horror Show	Frank-n-Furter	Lake Dillon Theatre	
2008	Into the Woods	Steward	Lake Dillon Theatre	
2008	Little Shop of Horrors	Seymour	Lake Dillon Theatre	
2008	Rabbit Hole	Jason	Lake Dillon Theatre	
2009–10	Spring Awakening	Moritz Stiefel (replacement)	First U.S. National Tour	
2011	Little Miss Sunshine	Dwayne Hoover	La Jolla Playhouse	
2011	Mormons, Mothers and Monsters	Samuel	Barrington Stage Company	
2012	Wicked	Boq (replacement)	**Gershwin Theatre**	
2012	Rent	Steve	New World Stages	
2012	Bare: The Musical	Peter	New World Stages	
2013–14	Matilda the Musical	Michael Wormwood	**Shubert Theatre**	
2014–15	The Curious Incident of the Dog in the Night-Time	Christopher Boone (alternate)	**Ethel Barrymore Theatre**	
2016	Clarkston	Jake	Dallas Theater Center	
2016	Poster Boy	Tyler Clementi	Williamstown Theatre Festival	
2017–18	Hello, Dolly!	Barnaby Tucker	**Shubert Theatre**	
2018–19	Dear Evan Hansen	Evan Hansen (replacement)	**Music Box Theatre**	
2019–20	To Kill a Mockingbird	Dill Harris (replacement)	**Shubert Theatre**	
2022	Shucked	Storyteller 2	Pioneer Theatre Company	
2023	Camelot	Mordred	**Vivian Beaumont Theater**	
2024	The Seven Year Disappear	Naphtali	The New Group	
2024	Safety Not Guaranteed	Kenneth Calloway	Brooklyn Academy of Music - Harvey Theater	
2025	Floyd Collins	Skeets Miller	**Vivian Beaumont Theater**	
2025	Bat Boy: The Musical	Edgar / Bat Boy	New York City Center	

• Bold indicates a Broadway theatre

== Television/film credits ==
Year	Title	Role	Notes
2017–18	Nella the Princess Knight	Trevor (voice)	3 episodes
2020	Archibald's Next Big Thing	Archibald (singing voice)	Episode: "Baritone Tea"
2021	Evil	Mitch Otterbean	Episode: "C is for Cannibal"
2021	Law & Order: Special Victims Unit	Diggy Wheeler	Episode: "Fast Times @TheWheelhouse"
2024	Your Monster	Scotty	
2025	Things Like This	Eric	
2026	Can't Go Over It	Caleb	
2026	The Gilded Age	Oliver	8 episodes

== Discography ==
=== Cast recordings ===
- Matilda the Musical – Original Broadway Cast Recording (2013)
- Hello, Dolly! – 2017 Broadway Cast of Hello Dolly! (2017)
- Dear Evan Hansen [Deluxe Album] – Original Broadway Cast Recording (2018)
- Floyd Collins—Original Broadway Cast Recording (2025)

=== Singles ===
- "Disappear (Acoustic)" (2018)
- "Obvious" (2018)

=== As featured artist ===
- Drafts: The Music and Lyrics of Alexander Sage Oyen, Vol. 1 (2012)
- Bare Naked by Lynne Shankel (2017)
- ALBUM by Joe Iconis (2022)

== Awards and nominations ==
Year	Award	Category	Show	Result	Ref.
2009	Denver Post Ovation Award	Best Supporting Actor	Spring Awakening	Won	
2009	BroadwayWorld Best of L.A. & O.C.	Best Individual Performance	Spring Awakening	Won	
2025	Outer Critics Circle Award	Outstanding Lead Performer in an Off-Broadway Musical	Safety Not Guaranteed	Nominated	
2025	Tony Award	Best Featured Actor in a Musical	Floyd Collins	Nominated	
2026	Drama League Award	Distinguished Performance	Bat Boy: The Musical	Pending	

== See also ==
- LGBT culture in New York City
- List of LGBT people from New York City
- NYC Pride March
