= Bruce Bannister =

Bruce Bannister may refer to:

- Bruce Bannister (footballer) (born 1947), English footballer and businessman
- Bruce W. Bannister (born 1972), American attorney and politician, member of the South Carolina House of Representatives
