= Elsie Fest =

Annual music festival in New York City

- Locations: New York City, NY, USA
- Years active: 2015 - Present
- Website: Official website

Elsie Fest is an annual music festival in New York City co-created and produced by Darren Criss, Ricky Rollins, Lea Michele, and Jordan Roth. The yearly festival is touted as "New York City’s first outdoor music festival celebrating tunes from the stage and screen". Elsie Fest's inaugural event was held at New York City's JBL Live at Pier 97 on September 27, 2015. A portion of the proceeds benefited BroadwayCares/Equity Fights AIDS.

== History ==
Elsie Fest was first held in 2015 by founder and creator Darren Criss. The annual outdoor festival features music from stage and screen sung by popular Broadway and pop culture performers.

The festival is named after a character in the song Cabaret from the musical of the same name.

== Notable performers ==
The 2015 line-up included performers Lea Salonga (special guest Darren Criss), Team Starkid, Seth Rudetsky, Laura Osnes (special guest Aaron Tveit), Aaron Tveit (special guest Laura Osnes), Leslie Odom Jr. (special guest Aaron Tveit), and Darren Criss (special guests Tyler Glenn, A Great Big World and Team Starkid).

The second annual Elsie Fest was held on September 5, 2016, at the Ford Amphitheatre on Coney Island, NY. The line-up included: Megan Hilty, Tituss Burgess, Todrick Hall, Lena Hall, Jason Robert Brown, Corey Cott, Rebel and a Basketcase (Evan Rachel Wood & Zach Villa), Pasek and Paul , Darren Criss, Julie James, Cynthia Erivo, Caleb McLaughlin, Gaten Matarazzo, and Liz Callaway

Elsie Fest returned for its third production on October 8, 2017, at Central Park's Summerstage and amassed a crowd of more than 4,000 fans. The line-up included: Alan Cumming, Lea Michele, Darren Criss, Jeremy Jordan, Ingrid Michaelson, Norm Lewis, Auliʻi Cravalho, Keala Settle, cast from The Band's Visit, and cast members from Miss Saigon.

In 2018, Elsie Fest returned to Central Park's Summerstage on October 7, and featured performances from:

- Sutton Foster
- Joshua Henry
- Alex Newell
- Darren Criss
- Rufus Wainwright
- Grant Gustin
- Matthew Morrison
- Casey Cott
- Jodi Benson
- Anna and the Apocalypse
- Be More Chill
- The Prom

In 2019, Elsie Fest announced its annual festival would be held on October 5, 2019, again at Central Park's Summerstage. The line-up included:

- High School Musical: The Musical: The Series
- R&H Goes Pop
- Dyllón Burnside
- Rob Rokicki Of The Lightning Thief
- Anaïs Mitchell
- Ariana DeBose
- Gavin Creel
- Jagged Little Pill
- Cynthia Erivo
- Michael Feinstein
- Darren Criss featuring Cast of A Very Potter Musical, Team Starkid

In 2020, Elsie Fest was cancelled due to the ongoing COVID-19 pandemic.

In 2021, it was held during the BRIC Celebrate Brooklyn! Festival at the Prospect Park Bandshell. The line-up included:

- Jordan Fisher
- Adrienne Warren
- Barlow & Bear
- Darren Criss
- Alex Brightman
- Kristin Maldonado
- Krysta Rodriguez
- Freestyle Love Supreme
- AJ Holmes
- Betsy Wolfe
