= Evan Hansen =

Character from the 2015 musical Dear Evan Hansen

- Ben Platt as Evan Hansen in the Broadway production of Dear Evan Hansen in 2017
- Created by: Steven Levenson; Pasek and Paul
- Portrayed by: Broadway stage: Ben Platt; Noah Galvin; Taylor Trensch; Andrew Barth Feldman; Jordan Fisher; Ben Levi Ross; Colton Ryan (s/b); West End stage: Sam Tutty; 2021 film version: Ben Platt; US Tour: Ben Levi Ross; Stephen Christopher Anthony; Michael Fabisch; UK Tour: Ryan Kopel; Sonny Monaghan (Alternate)
- Age: 17 years

In-universe information
- Full name: 2018 novelization: Mark Evan Hansen
- Species: Human
- Gender: Male
- Occupation: High school student Co-President of The Connor Project; Former apprentice park ranger at Ellison State Park
- Family: Heidi Hansen (mother); 2018 novelization: Mark Hansen (father; divorced); Theresa (stepmother); Haley (stepsister); Dixie (stepsister); Unnamed boy (half brother)
- Significant other: Zoe Murphy
- Nationality: American
- Residence: Bethesda, Maryland, United States
- Education: 2021 film version: Westview High School

Evan Hansen is the titular character and main protagonist of the Broadway musical Dear Evan Hansen by Steven Levenson, Benj Pasek and Justin Paul. A bullied 17-year-old high schooler with social anxiety and depression, who lives with his single mother Heidi Hansen after she divorced from his father Mark Hansen ten years before, he attempts to find the acceptance and love he has been lacking in his life. On his journey to be found, he discovers the consequences of risking it all for the chance to be heard.

The character of Evan was originated on stage by Ben Platt, who won the Tony Award for Best Actor for his performance and reprised it in the 2021 film adaptation of the musical. In the show, he appears in a total of 11 musical numbers. The character's signature song is "Waving Through a Window," which is sung early in the musical's first act as his "I Want" song and has become an anthem for those hoping to make a connection while in a state of isolation and depression.

== Inspiration ==
The musical, as well as the character, are said to have been inspired by an incident that happened during Benj Pasek's high school years. Stacey Mindich, who produced the Broadway, national tour and West End productions, explained "A student in [Pasek's] class died tragically of a drug overdose. It was someone who had been sort of a loner, didn't have a lot of friends or status at school, but suddenly in the wake of the death, Benj watched as everyone wanted to claim that they had been friends with him and claim that they had been a part of this person's life..." Author Steven Levenson, during a panel event at the 2019 New York Comic Con, added "We all [noticed] a really fascinating, bizarre phenomenon of public grieving [on social media]. Whenever a celebrity would die or something really tragic would happen, there was this outpouring online of people kind of making it about themselves."

== Portrayals ==
=== Stage version ===
==== Broadway and US Tour ====
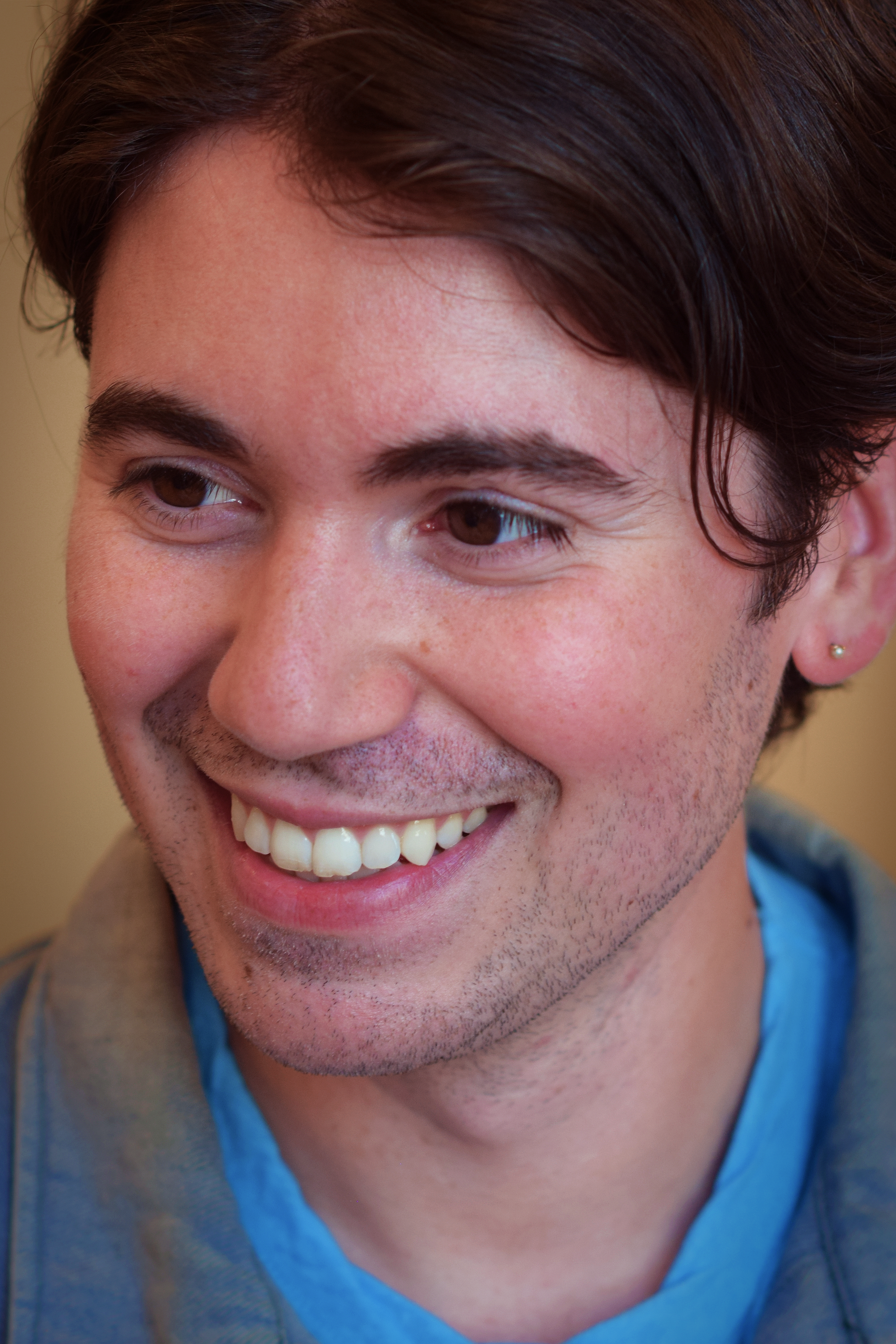
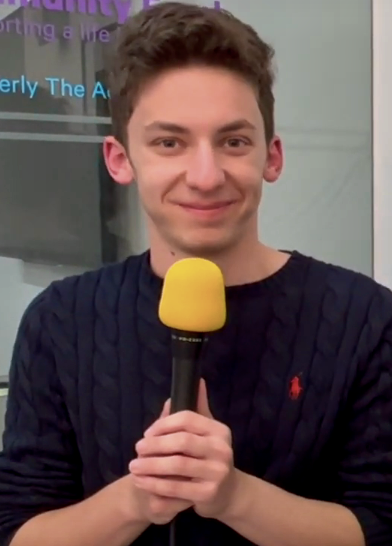
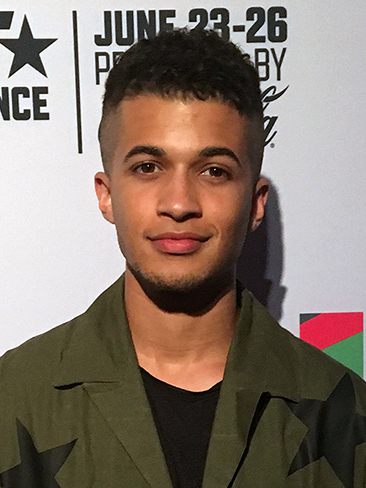
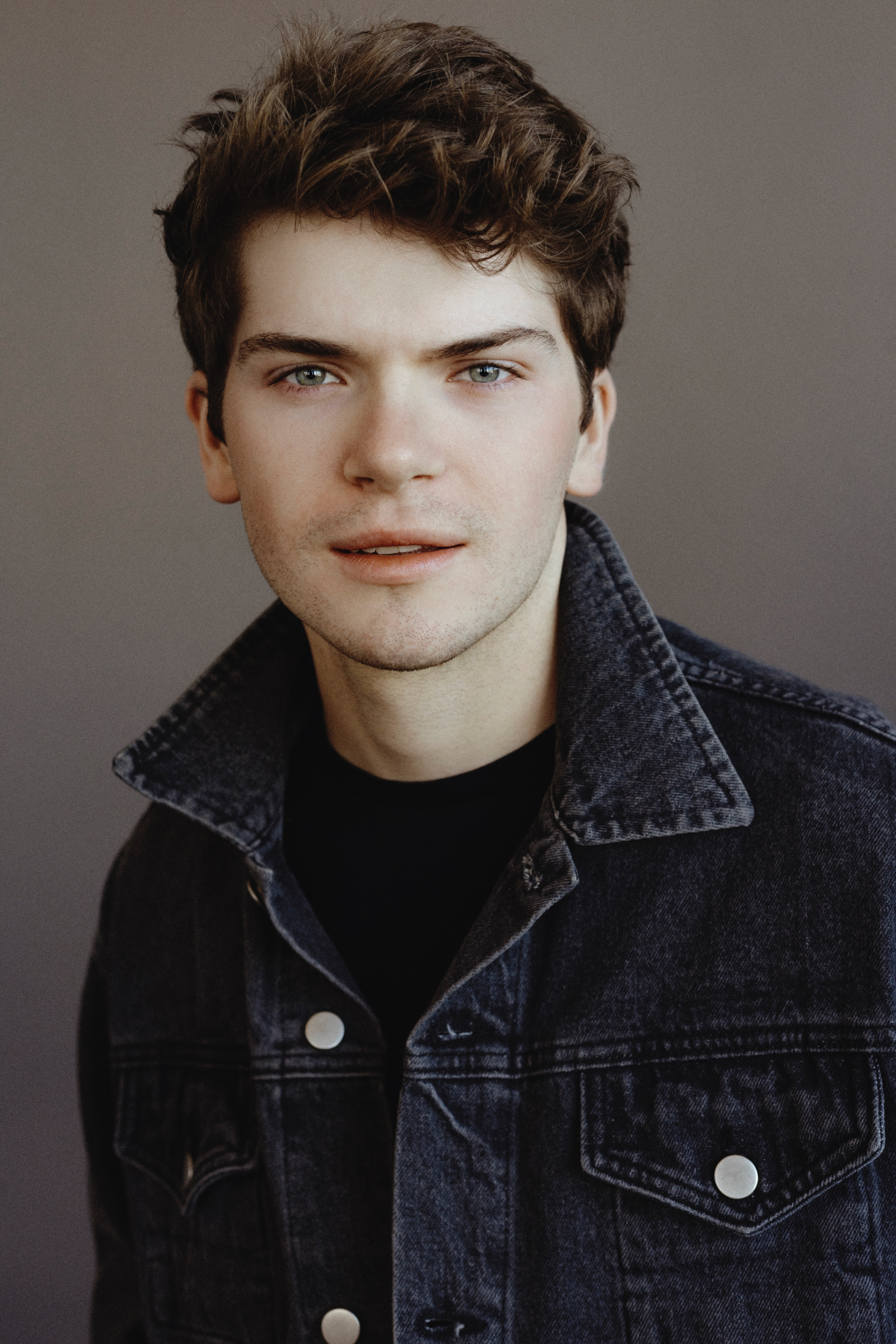
Noah Galvin, Andrew Barth Feldman, Jordan Fisher and Colton Ryan are among those who have played Evan Hansen on Broadway.

On stage, the role of Evan was originated by Ben Platt, beginning with the musical's workshop production in 2014 and performing the role publicly for the first time in Washington, D.C. at the Arena Stage. The overwhelming positive reception toward the production and Platt's performance resulted in the show being transferred to Off-Broadway at Second Stage Theater in 2016 and finally to Broadway at the Music Box Theatre later that year. Platt played his final on-stage performance in the role on November 19, 2017. Notable replacements and understudies who have played the role on Broadway include Platt's future partner Noah Galvin, Taylor Trensch, Jordan Fisher, Ben Levi Ross and Colton Ryan, the latter of whom would go on to play Connor Murphy in the 2021 film version. In 2019, history was made when then-16-year-old Andrew Barth Feldman, following his win at the 2018 Jimmy Awards, became the first age-accurate actor to play the role on Broadway. He exited the role on January 26, 2020, prior to Jordan Fisher's run. Serving as Evan alternates for the Broadway production included Michael Lee Brown and Zachary Noah Piser. During the show's US tour, which launched in October 2018 at the Denver Center for the Performing Arts' Buell Theatre and concluded on July 2, 2023 at the Koger Center for the Arts in Columbia, South Carolina, Ben Levi Ross originated the role of Evan, followed by Stephen Christopher Anthony (who served as the tour's first Evan alternate) and Anthony Norman. When Stephen Christopher Anthony assumed the role full-time, the alternate Evan position was later assumed by Sam Primack and Jeffrey Cornelius. During the show's second US tour, which launched in September 2024 at Theater Under the Stars in Houston, Texas, Evan was played by Michael Fabisch with Michael Perez as his alternate. Fabisch reprised his role in the musical's first Midwest region production at The Muny in St. Louis, Missouri from July 28 to August 3, 2025, with Oscar Williams as his understudy.

==== International productions ====
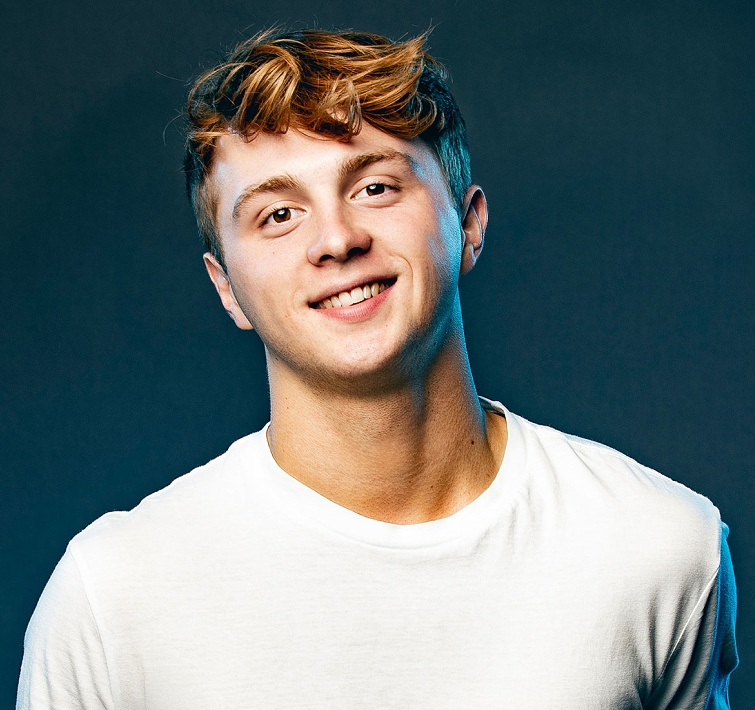
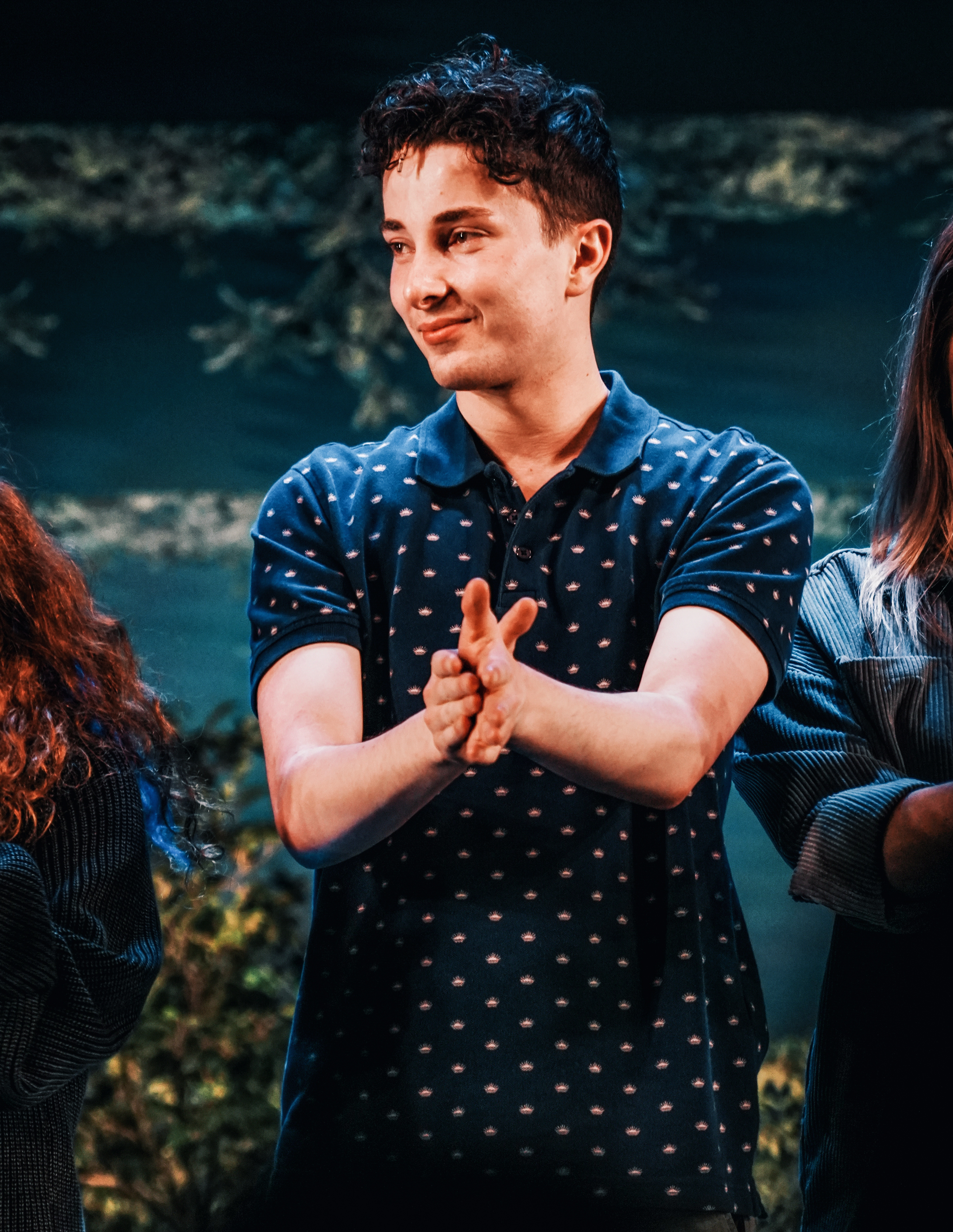
Sam Tutty played Evan Hansen in the West End production, while Ryan Kopel currently plays him in the 2024-25 UK Tour.

Internationally, Robert Markus originated the role of Evan in the Toronto production at the Royal Alexandra Theatre in 2019, with Piser serving as his alternate. Sam Tutty originated the role of Evan in the West End production at the Noël Coward Theatre in London, which began its run that same year before closing in 2022, with a brief halt in performances from March 2020 to October 26, 2021 due to the COVID-19 pandemic in the United Kingdom. Marcus Harman served as his alternate. In the 2024 South Korean production, which opened on March 28, 2024, at the Chungmu Arts Center in Seoul by S&Co, the role of Evan was triple-cast, featuring Park Kang-hyun, Kim Sung-kyu and Lim Kyu-hyung. Máximo Meyer played the role in the Argentinian production which opened in May 2023 at the Metropolitan Theatre in Buenos Aires. In the Finnish production, which opened on September 28, 2023, Evan was played by Petja Pulkkinen, with Julius Suominen serving as his alternate. In the 2024 UK Tour, Evan was played by Ryan Kopel with Sonny Monaghan both serving as his alternate at every matinee performance twice a week, and being in the production's ensemble. Beau Woodbridge played Evan in the 2024 Australian production, which ran from October 12 to November 17, 2024 at the Roslyn Packer Theatre.

=== 2018 novelization ===
The musical was adapted into a young adult novel by actor and singer-songwriter Val Emmich, in collaboration with Pasek, Paul, and Levenson. The novel, which features additional material based on scenes and songs cut from the show's development that flesh out and expand upon the story, was released by Little, Brown Books for Young Readers on October 9, 2018. Despite not being entirely canon to the stage version, the novel adds in new scenes and story elements to explore more of Evan's character background, such as his appointments with Dr. Sherman, his family history involving his divorced father, attending Connor's wake and interactions with other characters.

=== 2021 film ===
Ben Platt, as he appears as Evan in the 2021 film adaptation. He received widespread backlash for being allowed, at age 27, to reprise his role on-screen.

Ben Platt reprised the role of Evan in Universal Pictures' 2021 film adaptation of the musical, produced by his father, Marc Platt, and directed by Stephen Chbosky. On his casting, Chbosky explained that the film's main goal was to capture and immortalize Platt's performance, saying that "His understanding of the character is so complete and so profound. I couldn't imagine anybody else playing it. It's his part. I felt very strongly about it. And to me it was never even a consideration." He later explained that this was the reason why the film omitted the musical's opening number, "Anybody Have a Map", saying that "We're really on Evan's journey. It freed us up to meet all the characters through Evan. And it binds the audience to a way in Evan that is so valuable." In the film, Evan's journey remains mostly the same, except for two notable changes: He does not see visions of Connor telling him to push forward with the lies and keep his memory alive (resulting from the cutting of "Disappear") and the story's ending was slightly altered to show him coming clean publicly through a video he posts on social media, followed by getting in touch with those who knew Connor to get to know him better and receiving a video of Connor performing music while in rehab, which he passes along to the Murphys, Alana, and Jared.

In a February 2021 interview with Drew Barrymore on The Drew Barrymore Show, Ben Platt described his experience of recreating his performance as Evan Hansen as "really special" and "bizarre", while also hoping the film will be "a really moving experience for a lot of different ages of people ... I think it's going to be particularly poignant in terms of everybody's inability and ability to reach out, and the ways in which we struggle to do that, and the magic that can happen when you do connect with someone and finally feel seen." On May 13, 2021, Ben Platt admitted he was apprehensive about translating his performance for the screen. "I think I was nervous about having to meet that same level in a medium that I'm not necessarily as instinctually comfortable in, and that doesn't necessarily lend itself to the same kind of fireworks as a live performance." Ultimately, Platt overcame his personal reservations because they felt like "small beer...Having an opportunity to share this story with, like, millions more people is ultimately much more important than my being worried that my performance won't be as good as it was on stage." Platt also confirmed he lost weight and grew his hair out to look "authentic" as a gawky and fresh-faced 17-year-old.

== Reception and legacy ==
"Don't waste any time trying to be like anybody but yourself, because the things that make you strange are the things that make you powerful."

— Ben Platt upon winning the Tony Award for Best Actor in a Musical at the 71st Tony Awards, 2017

The stage version's portrayal of the character of Evan Hansen received a mostly positive reception, with audiences being able to relate to the character's struggles, mainly thanks to Platt's performance, which also received widespread critical acclaim, being called "historic" and "one of the greatest leading male performances [I've] ever seen in a musical". Barbara Mackay in reviewing the Arena Stage production for TheatreMania wrote: "Since the success of the musical depends entirely on whether Evan's solitary nature appears funny or weird, Evan's ability to laugh at himself and make the audience laugh is crucial. Platt is charming as he eternally twists his shirt tails and hangs his head... Although the themes of grief and loneliness are serious, the musical is anything but somber. It addresses challenging facts of life. But from start to finish, when Evan leaves his room and finds an authentic life outside it, Dear Evan Hansen contains far more joy than sadness." In his review of the Broadway production of the musical for The New York Times, Charles Isherwood praised Ben Platt's performance, writing "...when Mr. Platt sings Evan's songs — including the touching introductory cri de coeur, "Waving Through a Window" — we can simultaneously hear the heartsore, conflicted young man and the intelligent, kindly kid buried inside him." For his performance, Platt received numerous accolades, including the Tony Award for Best Actor in a Musical, making him the youngest solo winner in the category at the age of 23; this record was broken in 2022, when Myles Frost won the award at the age of 22 for his performance in MJ the Musical.

During Andrew Barth Feldman's run on Broadway, his performance was also well-received, with Sarah Bahr in The New York Times writing, "Andrew Barth Feldman made me forget where I was, who I was, that I was anything other than part of the world onstage...I'm pretty sure I didn't draw breath the entire first act." Sam Tutty's performance as Evan in the West End production also received acclaim, earning him the Laurence Olivier Award for Best Actor in a Leading Role in a Musical. At only 22 years old of age, he became one of the youngest winners in the category. For the Buenos Aires production, Máximo Meyer's portrayal of Evan received a positive review from Felicitas de la Fare of BroadwayWorld, who wrote that Meyer "dazzles the audience not only with his acting skills but also with his gifted amazing voice. He manages to convey the anxiety and inner angst of the character in an authentic and moving way."

Despite the praise, the character's motives and choices have also been criticized. Jason Zinoman in a piece for Slate argues that the musical "employs many different tactics to prevent us from seeing Evan Hansen as a jerk, but its most audacious is to not allow anyone onstage to see him that way...The choice to give Evan Hansen no comeuppance doesn't make dramatic sense. But you don't need to be too cynical to see its commercial and emotional logic. Not giving voice to anger at Evan Hansen avoids the more unpleasant ramifications of his exploitation of a tragedy for his own personal gain, which might complicate the audience's reaction to him. Evan Hansen isn't as interested in these themes as it is in keeping the focus on the insecurity of the outsider, the nerd, the teenager yearning for acceptance. (To be fair, it is also interested in Evan's mother, who has one of the most moving songs in the show.)"

Hilton Als of The New Yorker was also critical, writing "It would have been amazing if Levenson had continued to dig into Evan's awfulness. Instead, he takes side trips into tired knee-jerk liberalism and therapeutic healing ... Evan confesses his deceit and makes it clear that all he wanted, really, was to be loved, because of, well, that absent daddy, that inattentive mommy, and the nastiness of the world. With that false move, the show’s creators risk destroying what’s so spikily fascinating about Evan. Still, until the second act, and despite it, Platt gives a performance that binds us to him in the way that Holden Caulfield, that other teen with a voice, did—especially when he said, 'It's funny. Don't ever tell anybody anything. If you do, you start missing everybody.'"

In 2020, the character ranked number 11 on a fan-voted poll of "The top 20 musical characters of all time" conducted by WhatsOnStage.com and number 62 on BroadwayWorld's list of "The 101 Greatest Musical Theatre Characters (1940-2020)."

=== 2021 film controversy ===
The portrayal of Evan in the 2021 film, however, was widely panned by critics and audiences alike even before it was released, all of whom deemed Ben Platt, at age 27 at the time, too old to play the part, attributing the casting decision to nepotism and the involvement of his father, Marc Platt, as one of the film's lead producers. Adrian Horton of The Guardian, referring to Platt's presentation as a teenager, and the film's treatment of mental health, stated, "The movie asks the audience to not look at two elephants in the room, and unfortunately, no amount of soaring music can relieve that heavy a burden." Nate Jones of Vulture also called out Platt for being too old for the character, adding that his de-aging makeup backfired. He joked, "When he gets up onstage for the second act's big musical number, I wasn't sure if he was going to memorialize his dead classmate or speak on the importance of 401(k) matching." Peter Debruge of Variety, however, liked Platt's acting, but disliked the choice to cast "actors born the previous century" as high school students.

In response to the reviews, Steven Levenson said that he believed in the "value of criticism", but characterized critiques of Platt's casting as "cruel". On August 8, 2021, in an interview with Zach Sang on his YouTube talk show, Ben Platt said "I think the reaction is largely from people who don't understand the context of the piece — the fact that I created the role and workshopped it for three years ... Were I not to do the movie, it probably wouldn't get made. And so, I think, my defensive response is to want to go onto Twitter and be like, 'F you, guys. You don't even know that this wouldn't exist without me.' Of course, that's not true entirely and not my place to say. All I have to do is let the work speak for itself." His on-screen performance would earn him a nomination for Worst Actor at the 42nd Golden Raspberry Awards in 2022, as well as spawn internet memes based on two scenes from the film: a close-up of Evan crying during the climax of "Words Fail", his expression wrenched and tortured, and the moment Evan runs off from Zoe Murphy in the hallways during their first meeting at school. In 2024, the film's portrayal of Evan was included on CinemaBlend's list of "32 Main Characters That Are The Worst Part Of Their Own Movies."

=== In other media ===
The character of Evan Hansen has appeared and been parodied in other projects and media related to musical theater, as well as some related to the COVID-19 pandemic. Notable examples include a sketch during Season 47 of Saturday Night Live, which featured Kyle Mooney costumed in the character's design from the 2021 film version, and a segment of the Off-Broadway show Forbidden Broadway: The Next Generation, which parodied the "Waving Through a Window" sequence.
