= List of awards and nominations received by Jennifer Lawrence =

Accolades received by American actress

Jennifer Lawrence awards and nominations
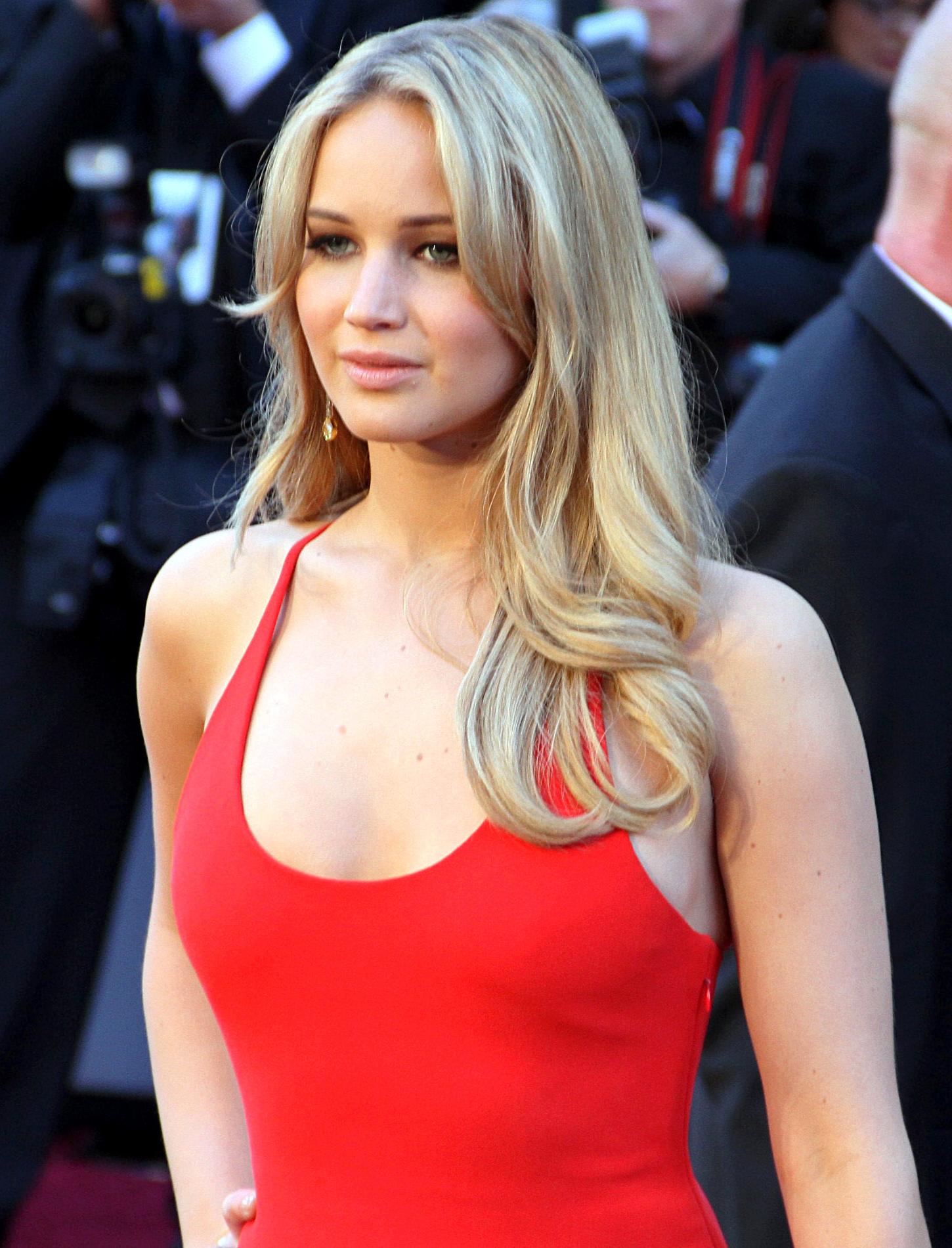
- Lawrence at the 2011 Academy Awards
Awards and nominations
Award	Wins	Nominations
Academy Awards	1	4
BAFTA Awards	1	3
Critics' Choice Movie Awards	4	15
Emmy Awards	0	1
Golden Globe Awards	3	7
Peabody Awards	1	1
Screen Actors Guild Awards	2	6

Totals (Note: Certain award groups do not simply award one winner. They acknowledge several different recipients, have runners-up, and have third place. Since this is a specific recognition and is different from losing an award, runner-up mentions are considered wins in this award tally. For simplification and to avoid errors, each award in this list has been presumed to have had a prior nomination.)
- Wins: 93
- Nominations: 200

Jennifer Lawrence is an American actress who has received multiple awards and nominations throughout her career, including an Academy Award, a British Academy Film Award, three Golden Globe Awards, four Critics' Choice Awards and two Actor Awards.

After playing minor roles in several films and television shows, Lawrence starred in her first major role on the TBS sitcom The Bill Engvall Show (2007–2009), which earned her a Young Artist Award for Outstanding Young Performer in a TV Series. In 2008, she won the Marcello Mastroianni Award at the 65th Venice International Film Festival for the drama The Burning Plain. For her breakout role as a poverty-stricken teenager Ree Dolly in the 2010 acclaimed independent coming-of-age mystery drama Winter's Bone, 20-year-old Lawrence received her first nomination for the Academy Award for Best Actress in a Leading Role, becoming the second-youngest Best Actress nominee at the time. The film also garnered her Best Actress nominations from the Hollywood Foreign Press, BAFTA, SAG, and Critics' Choice award ceremonies, and won a Breakthrough Performance Award from the National Board of Review. In 2011, she received several nominations for her portrayal of Mystique in X-Men: First Class, including the People's Choice and Teen Choice Awards ceremonies.

Lawrence won several awards for both her 2012 releases. For her performance in the comedy-drama Silver Linings Playbook, she won the Golden Globe Award for Best Actress – Comedy, the SAG Award for Outstanding Lead Actress, and the Academy Award for Best Actress, becoming the second-youngest winner in the category. The same year, she won the Saturn Award for Best Actress, the Empire Award for Best Actress, the MTV Movie Award for Best Female Performance, and the Critics' Choice Movie Award for Best Actress in an Action Movie for portraying the heroine Katniss Everdeen in The Hunger Games. The following year, her performance as a troubled wife in American Hustle (2013) won her the Golden Globe and BAFTA Award for Best Supporting Actress, and a Screen Actors Guild Award for Outstanding Performance by a Cast in a Motion Picture, and also garnered her the nominations for a Screen Actors Guild Award for Outstanding Supporting Actress and the Academy Award for Best Supporting Actress.

From 2013 to 2015, she received several awards and nominations for her performances in the other three films in The Hunger Games series, including the MTV Best Female Performance Award for Catching Fire, and three Critics Choice nominations for each films. The role of Katniss Everdeen made Guinness World Records to recognize Lawrence as the highest-grossing action heroine of all time. Her reprisal of Mystique in X-Men: Days of Future Past (2014) earned her two People's Choice Awards for Favorite Actress and Favorite Action Movie Actress. In 2015, she starred as the Joy Mangano in the biopic Joy, which won her third Golden Globe Award and second in the Best Actress – Motion Picture Comedy or Musical category, and another Academy Award for Best Actress nomination, making her the youngest person to receive four Oscar nominations.

== Major associations ==
=== Academy Awards ===
The Academy Awards are a set of awards given by the Academy of Motion Picture Arts and Sciences annually for excellence of cinematic achievements. Lawrence has won one award from four nominations.

Year	Nominated work	Category	Result	Ref.
2011	Winter's Bone	Best Actress	Nominated	
2013	Silver Linings Playbook	Best Actress	Won	
2014	American Hustle	Best Supporting Actress	Nominated	
2016	Joy	Best Actress	Nominated	

=== British Academy Film Awards ===
The British Academy Film Award is an annual award show presented by the British Academy of Film and Television Arts. Lawrence has received one award from three nominations.

Year	Nominated work	Category	Result	Ref.
2013	Silver Linings Playbook	Best Actress in a Leading Role	Nominated	
2014	American Hustle	Best Actress in a Supporting Role	Won	
2026	Die My Love	Outstanding British Film	Nominated	

=== Critics' Choice Movie Awards ===
The Critics' Choice Movie Awards are presented annually since 1995 by the Broadcast Film Critics Association for outstanding achievements in the cinema industry. Lawrence has received four awards from fifteen nominations.

Year	Nominated work	Category	Result	Ref.
2011	Winter's Bone	Best Actress	Nominated	
2011	Winter's Bone	Best Young Performer	Nominated	
2013	Silver Linings Playbook	Best Acting Ensemble	Won (Note: Shared with the cast)	
2013	Silver Linings Playbook	Best Actress	Nominated	
2013	Silver Linings Playbook	Best Actress in a Comedy	Won	
2013	The Hunger Games	Best Actress in an Action Movie	Won	
2014	American Hustle	Best Acting Ensemble	Won	
2014	American Hustle	Best Supporting Actress	Nominated	
2014	The Hunger Games: Catching Fire	Best Actress in an Action Movie	Nominated	
2015	The Hunger Games: Mockingjay – Part 1	Best Actress in an Action Movie	Nominated	
2016	The Hunger Games: Mockingjay – Part 2	Best Actress in an Action Movie	Nominated	
2016	Joy	Best Actress	Nominated	
2016	Joy	Best Actress in a Comedy	Nominated	
2022	Don't Look Up	Best Acting Ensemble	Nominated	
2023	No Hard Feelings	Best Comedy	Nominated	

=== Emmy Awards ===
The Emmy Awards are an extensive range of awards presented annually since 1949 by the Academy of Television Arts & Sciences (ATAS), the National Academy of Television Arts & Sciences (NATAS), and the International Academy of Television Arts and Sciences (IATAS) for artistic and technical merit for the television industry. Lawrence has received a nomination.

Year	Nominated work	Category	Result	Ref.
News and Documentary Emmy Awards
2025	Bread and Roses	Outstanding Current Affairs Documentary	Nominated	

=== Golden Globe Awards ===
The Golden Globe Award is an accolade bestowed by the 93 members of the Hollywood Foreign Press Association (HFPA) recognizing excellence in film and television, both domestic and foreign. Lawrence has received three awards from seven nominations.

Year	Nominated work	Category	Result	Ref.
2011	Winter's Bone	Best Actress in a Motion Picture – Drama	Nominated	
2013	Silver Linings Playbook	Best Actress in a Motion Picture – Musical or Comedy	Won	
2014	American Hustle	Best Supporting Actress – Motion Picture	Won	
2016	Joy	Best Actress in a Motion Picture – Musical or Comedy	Won	
2022	Don't Look Up	Best Actress in a Motion Picture – Musical or Comedy	Nominated	
2024	No Hard Feelings	Best Actress in a Motion Picture – Musical or Comedy	Nominated	
2026	Die My Love	Best Actress in a Motion Picture – Drama	Nominated	

=== Peabody Awards ===
The Peabody Awards are presented annually since 1940 by the Henry W. Grady College of Journalism and Mass Communication at the University of Georgia for recognizing achievement and meritorious public service by television and radio stations, networks, producing organizations, individuals, and the World Wide Web. Lawrence has received an award from a nomination.

Year	Nominated work	Category	Result	Ref.
2025	Bread and Roses	Documentary	Won	

=== Screen Actors Guild Awards ===
The Screen Actors Guild Awards are organized by the Screen Actors Guild‐American Federation of Television and Radio Artists. First awarded in 1995, the awards aim to recognize excellent achievements in film and television. Lawrence has received two awards from six nominations.

Year	Nominated work	Category	Result	Ref.
2011	Winter's Bone	Outstanding Performance by a Female Actor in a Leading Role in a Motion Picture	Nominated	
2013	Silver Linings Playbook	Outstanding Performance by an Ensemble Cast in a Motion Picture	Nominated	
2013	Silver Linings Playbook	Outstanding Performance by a Female Actor in a Leading Role in a Motion Picture	Won	
2014	American Hustle	Outstanding Performance by an Ensemble Cast in a Motion Picture	Won	
2014	American Hustle	Outstanding Performance by a Female Actor in a Supporting Role in a Motion Picture	Nominated	
2022	Don't Look Up	Outstanding Performance by an Ensemble Cast in a Motion Picture	Nominated	

== Miscellaneous awards ==
=== AACTA Awards ===
The Australian Academy of Cinema and Television Arts Awards are presented annually by the Australian Academy of Cinema and Television Arts (AACTA) to recognize and honor achievements in the film and television industry. Lawrence has won two awards from three nominations.

Year	Nominated work	Category	Result	Ref.
2013	Silver Linings Playbook	Best International Actress	Won	
2014	American Hustle	Best International Supporting Actress	Won	
2024	—	Audience Choice Favourite Actress	Nominated	

=== British Independent Film Awards ===
The British Independent Film Awards (BIFA) is an organisation that celebrates, supports, and promotes British independent cinema and film-making talent in the United Kingdom. Lawrence has received one nomination.

Year	Nominated work	Category	Result	Ref.
2025	Die My Love	Best Lead Performance	Nominated	

=== Capri Hollywood International Film Festival ===
The Capri Hollywood International Film Festival is an annual film festival held every late December or early January in Capri, Italy. Lawrence has received one award.

Year	Nominated work	Category	Result	Ref.
2012	Silver Linings Playbook	Best Ensemble Cast	Won	

=== Critics' Choice Super Awards ===
The Critics' Choice Super Awards is an awards show presented annually by the Critics Choice Association to honor the finest in genre fiction film, television and home media releases, including action, superhero, horror, science fiction, fantasy, and animation releases. Lawrence has been nominated once.

Year	Nominated work	Category	Result	Ref.
2022	Don't Look Up	Best Actress in a Science Fiction/Fantasy Movie	Nominated	

=== Dorian Awards ===
The Dorian Awards are presented by the Gay and Lesbian Entertainment Critics Association (GALECA). Lawrence has been nominated once.

Year	Nominated work	Category	Result	Ref.
2012	Silver Linings Playbook	Film Performance of the Year – Actress	Nominated	

=== Empire Awards ===
The Empire Awards is a British awards ceremony held annually to recognize cinematic achievements. Lawrence has received one award from five nominations.

Year	Nominated work	Category	Result	Ref.
2011	Winter's Bone	Best Newcomer	Nominated	
2013	The Hunger Games	Best Actress	Won	
2014	The Hunger Games: Catching Fire	Best Actress	Nominated	
2014	American Hustle	Best Supporting Actress	Nominated	
2016	The Hunger Games: Mockingjay – Part 2	Best Actress	Nominated	

=== Golden Raspberry Awards ===
The Golden Raspberry Award is a mock award presented in recognition of the worst in film. Lawrence has received one nomination.

Year	Nominated work	Category	Result	Ref.
2018	Mother!	Worst Actress	Nominated	

=== Gotham Awards ===
Presented by the Independent Filmmaker Project, the Gotham Awards award the best in independent film. Lawrence has won one award from three nominations.

Year	Nominated work	Category	Result	Ref.
2010	Winter's Bone	Best Ensemble Performance	Won	
2010	Winter's Bone	Breakthrough Actor/Actress	Nominated	
2012	Silver Linings Playbook	Best Ensemble Performance	Nominated	
2025	Die My Love	Outstanding Lead Performance	Nominated	

=== Guinness World Records ===
The Guinness World Records is a reference book published annually, containing a collection of world records, both human achievements and the extremes of the natural world.

Year	Nominated work	Category	Result	Ref.
2015	Katniss Everdeen	Highest-Grossing Action Heroine	Won	

=== Hollywood Film Festival ===
The Hollywood Film Awards are held annually to recognize talent in the film industry. Lawrence has received one award.

Year	Nominated work	Category	Result	Ref.
2010	Winter's Bone	New Hollywood Award	Won	

=== Independent Spirit Awards ===
The Independent Spirit Awards are presented annually by Film Independent, to award best in the independent film community. Lawrence has received one award from two nominations.

Year	Nominated work	Category	Result	Ref.
2010	Winter's Bone	Best Female Lead	Nominated	
2012	Silver Linings Playbook	Best Female Lead	Won	

=== Irish Film & Television Awards ===
The Irish Film & Television Academy Awards are presented annually to award best in films and television. Lawrence has received three nominations.

Year	Nominated work	Category	Result	Ref.
2010	Winter's Bone	Best International Actress	Nominated	
2012	Silver Linings Playbook	Best International Actress	Nominated	
2025	Die My Love	Best International Actress	Nominated	

=== Los Angeles Film Festival ===
Founded in 1995, the Los Angeles Film Festival is an annual film festival held in June. Lawrence has received one award.

Year	Nominated work	Category	Result	Ref.
2008	The Poker House	Outstanding Performance in the Narrative Competition	Won	

=== MTV Movie Awards ===
The MTV Movie Awards is an annual award show presented by MTV to honor outstanding achievements in films. Founded in 1992, the winners of the awards are decided online by the audience. Lawrence has received seven awards from twenty-two nominations.

Year	Nominated work	Category	Result	Ref.
2012	The Hunger Games	Best Female Performance	Won	
2012	The Hunger Games	Best Fight	Won (Note: Shared with Josh Hutcherson and Alexander Ludwig)	
2012	The Hunger Games	Best Hero	Nominated	
2012	The Hunger Games	Best Kiss	Nominated (Note: Shared with Josh Hutcherson)	
2012	The Hunger Games	Best Cast	Nominated	
2013	Silver Linings Playbook	Best Female Performance	Won	
2013	Silver Linings Playbook	Best Kiss	Won	
2013	Silver Linings Playbook	Best Musical Moment	Nominated	
2013	Silver Linings Playbook	Best On-Screen Duo	Nominated	
2013	House at the End of the Street	Best Scared-As-S**t Performance	Nominated	
2014	American Hustle	Best Kiss	Nominated	
2014	American Hustle	Best Musical Moment	Nominated	
2014	The Hunger Games: Catching Fire	Best Female Performance	Won	
2014	The Hunger Games: Catching Fire	Best Fight	Nominated	
2014	The Hunger Games: Catching Fire	Favorite Character	Nominated	
2015	The Hunger Games: Mockingjay – Part 1	Best Female Performance	Nominated	
2015	The Hunger Games: Mockingjay – Part 1	Best Musical Moment	Won	
2015	The Hunger Games: Mockingjay – Part 1	Best Hero	Nominated	
2016	Joy	Best Female Performance	Nominated	
2016	The Hunger Games: Mockingjay – Part 2	Best Action Performance	Nominated	
2016	The Hunger Games: Mockingjay – Part 2	Best Ensemble Cast	Nominated	
2016	The Hunger Games: Mockingjay – Part 2	Best Hero	Won	

=== National Board of Review ===
The National Board of Review was founded in 1909 in New York City to award "film, domestic and foreign, as both art and entertainment". Lawrence has received one award.

Year	Nominated work	Category	Result	Ref.
2010	Winter's Bone	Best Breakthrough Performance	Won	

=== Nickelodeon Kids' Choice Awards ===
The Nickelodeon Kids' Choice Awards, also known as the Kids Choice Awards (KCAs), is an annual awards show that airs on the Nickelodeon cable channel that honors the year's biggest television, film, and music acts, as voted by Nickelodeon viewers. Lawrence has received four awards from six nominations.

Year	Nominated work	Category	Result	Ref.
2013	The Hunger Games	Favorite Movie Actress	Nominated	
2013	The Hunger Games	Favorite Female Buttkicker	Nominated	
2014	The Hunger Games: Catching Fire	Favorite Movie Actress	Won	
2014	The Hunger Games: Catching Fire	Favorite Female Buttkicker	Won	
2015	The Hunger Games: Mockingjay – Part 1	Favorite Female Action Star	Won	
2016	The Hunger Games: Mockingjay – Part 2	Favorite Movie Actress	Won	
2017	X-Men: Apocalypse	Favorite Butt-Kicker	Nominated	

=== Palm Springs International Film Festival ===
Founded in 1989 in Palm Springs, California, the Palm Springs International Film Festival is held annually in January. Lawrence has won two awards.

Year	Nominated work	Category	Result	Ref.
2010	Winter's Bone	Rising Star Award	Won	
2013	American Hustle	Ensemble Cast Award	Won	

=== People's Choice Awards ===
The People's Choice Awards is an American awards show recognizing the people and the work of popular culture. The show has been held annually since 1975, and is voted on by the general public. Lawrence has received six awards from thirteen nominations.

Year	Nominated work	Category	Result	Ref.
2012	X-Men: First Class	Favorite Ensemble Movie Cast	Nominated	
2012	X-Men: First Class	Favorite Movie Superhero	Nominated	
2013	The Hunger Games	Favorite Movie Actress	Won	
2013	The Hunger Games	Favorite Face of Heroism	Won	
2013	The Hunger Games	Favorite On-Screen Chemistry	Won	
2015	X-Men: Days of Future Past	Favorite Movie Actress	Won	
2015	X-Men: Days of Future Past	Favorite Action Movie Actress	Won	
2017	X-Men: Apocalypse	Favorite Movie Actress	Won	
2017	X-Men: Apocalypse	Favorite Action Movie Actress	Nominated	
2018	Red Sparrow	Drama Movie Star of 2018	Nominated	
2018	Red Sparrow	Female Movie Star of 2018	Nominated	
2023	No Hard Feelings	The Comedy Movie Star of the Year	Won	
2023	No Hard Feelings	The Female Movie Star of the Year	Nominated	

=== San Sebastián International Film Festival ===
Founded in 1953, the San Sebastián International Film Festival is a festival held in San Sebastián, Gipuzkoa, Spain.

Year	Nominated work	Category	Result	Ref.
2025	—	Donostia Award	Won	

=== Santa Barbara International Film Festival ===
Founded in 1986, the Santa Barbara International Film Festival is an eleven-day film festival held in Santa Barbara, California. Lawrence has received one award.

Year	Nominated work	Category	Result	Ref.
2012	Silver Linings Playbook	Outstanding Performance of the Year	Won	

=== Satellite Awards ===
The Satellite Awards are a set of annual awards given by the International Press Academy. Lawrence has received one award from three nominations.

Year	Nominated work	Category	Result	Ref.
2010	Winter's Bone	Best Actress – Motion Picture Drama	Nominated	
2012	Silver Linings Playbook	Best Actress – Motion Picture	Won	
2013	American Hustle	Best Supporting Actress – Motion Picture	Nominated	

=== Saturn Awards ===
The Saturn Awards are presented annually by the Academy of Science Fiction, Fantasy, and Horror Films to honor science fiction, fantasy, and horror films, television, and home video. Lawrence has received one award and two nominations.

Year	Nominated work	Category	Result	Ref.
2012	The Hunger Games	Best Actress	Won	
2013	The Hunger Games: Catching Fire	Best Actress	Nominated	
2014	The Hunger Games: Mockingjay – Part 1	Best Actress	Nominated	
2017	Passengers	Best Actress	Nominated	

=== Seattle International Film Festival ===
Founded in 1976, the Seattle International Film Festival is a twenty five-day film festival held in Washington, North America. Lawrence has received one award.

Year	Nominated work	Category	Result	Ref.
2010	Winter's Bone	Best Actress	Won	

=== Spike Guys' Choice Awards ===
The Spike Guys' Choice Awards was annually held by television channel Spike.

Year	Nominated work	Category	Result	Ref.
2013	Jennifer Lawrence	Woman of the Year	Won	

=== Stockholm International Film Festival ===
Founded in 1990, the Stockholm International Film Festival is an annual film festival held in Sweden. Lawrence has received one award.

Year	Nominated work	Category	Result	Ref.
2010	Winter's Bone	Best Actress	Won	

=== Teen Choice Awards ===
The Teen Choice Awards is an annual awards show that airs on the Fox Network. The awards honor the year's biggest achievements in music, movies, sports, television, fashion, and other categories, voted by teen viewers. Lawrence has received eight awards from fourteen nominations.

Year	Nominated work	Category	Result	Ref.
2011	X-Men: First Class	Choice Movie: Breakout Star – Female	Nominated	
2011	X-Men: First Class	Choice Movie: Chemistry	Nominated	
2012	The Hunger Games	Choice Movie: Actress – Sci-Fi/Fantasy	Won	
2012	The Hunger Games	Choice Movie: Chemistry	Won	
2012	The Hunger Games	Choice Movie: Liplock	Won	
2014	American Hustle	Choice Movie Actress – Drama	Nominated	
2014	The Hunger Games: Catching Fire and X-Men: Days of Future Past	Choice Movie Actress – Sci-Fi/Fantasy	Won	
2014	The Hunger Games: Catching Fire	Choice Movie: Liplock	Nominated	
2015	The Hunger Games: Mockingjay – Part 1	Choice Movie Actress – Sci-Fi/Fantasy	Won	
2015	The Hunger Games: Mockingjay – Part 1	Choice Movie: Liplock	Nominated	
2016	The Hunger Games: Mockingjay – Part 2	Choice Movie: Actress – Sci-Fi/Fantasy	Won	
2016	The Hunger Games: Mockingjay – Part 2	Choice Movie: Chemistry	Nominated	
2016	The Hunger Games: Mockingjay – Part 2	Choice Movie: Liplock	Won	
2016	Joy	Choice Movie: Actress – Drama	Won	

=== Torino Film Festival ===
The Torino Film Festival (also known as Turin Film Festival) is an annual International film festival held in Turin, Italy.

Year	Nominated work	Category	Result	Ref.
2010	Winter's Bone	Best Actress	Won	

=== Venice Film Festival ===
Founded in 1932, the Venice Film Festival, or Venice International Film Festival, is the oldest film festival in the world. Lawrence has won one award.

Year	Nominated work	Category	Result	Ref.
2008	The Burning Plain	Marcello Mastroianni Award for Best Breakout Performance	Won	

=== Vulture Stunt Awards ===
Lawrence was awarded the "Best Stunt in a Non-Action Film" award as part of Vulture's 2024 Stunt Awards (Note: Lawrence shared the award with stunt coordinator John Cenatiempo, assistant stunt coordinator Alex Anagnostidis, director of photography Eigil Bryld, and performers Abigail Hupp, Christopher Bailey, and Eason Rytter) for the sequence in the 2023 sex comedy No Hard Feelings where a nude Lawrence fights off three teenagers on the beach, with the motivation "[Lawrence] approaches this sequence with the totally naked (literally) confidence of a no-longer-20-something hellion and executes it bluntly."

== Critics associations ==
Year	Nominated work	Association	Category	Result	Ref.
2010	Winter's Bone	Alliance of Women Film Journalists	Best Breakthrough Performance	Won	
2010	Winter's Bone	Chicago Film Critics Association	Most Promising Performer	Won	
2010	Winter's Bone	Detroit Film Critics Society	Best Actress	Won	
2010	Winter's Bone	Detroit Film Critics Society	Breakthrough Performance	Won	
2010	Winter's Bone	Detroit Film Critics Society	Best Ensemble	Won	
2010	Winter's Bone	Dublin Film Critics' Circle	Best Actress	Won	
2010	Winter's Bone	Dublin Film Critics' Circle	Breakthrough Award	Won	
2010	Winter's Bone	Florida Film Critics Circle	Pauline Kael Breakout Award	Won	
2010	Winter's Bone	Toronto Film Critics Association	Best Actress	Won	
2010	Winter's Bone	Vancouver Film Critics Circle	Best Actress	Won	
2010	Winter's Bone	Washington D.C. Area Film Critics Association	Best Actress	Won	
2010	Winter's Bone	Dallas–Fort Worth Film Critics Association	Best Actress	Runner-up	
2010	Winter's Bone	Los Angeles Film Critics Association	Best Actress	Runner-up	
2010	Winter's Bone	St. Louis Gateway Film Critics Association	Best Actress	Runner-up	
2010	Winter's Bone	Alliance of Women Film Journalists	Best Actress	Nominated	
2010	Winter's Bone	Alliance of Women Film Journalists	Best Ensemble Cast	Nominated	
2010	Winter's Bone	Alliance of Women Film Journalists	Unforgettable Moment Award	Nominated	
2010	Winter's Bone	Chicago Film Critics Association	Best Actress	Nominated	
2010	Winter's Bone	Houston Film Critics Society	Best Actress	Nominated	
2010	Winter's Bone	London Film Critics' Circle	Actress of the Year	Nominated	
2010	Winter's Bone	Online Film Critics Society	Best Actress	Nominated	
2010	Winter's Bone	San Diego Film Critics Society	Best Actress	Nominated	
2010	Winter's Bone	San Diego Film Critics Society	Best Performance by an Ensemble	Nominated	
2013	Silver Linings Playbook	Alliance of Women Film Journalists	Best Ensemble Cast	Won	
2013	Silver Linings Playbook	Austin Film Critics Association	Best Actress	Won	
2013	Silver Linings Playbook	Detroit Film Critics Society	Best Actress	Won	
2013	Silver Linings Playbook	Houston Film Critics Society Awards	Best Actress	Won	
2013	Silver Linings Playbook	Los Angeles Film Critics Association	Best Actress	Won	
2013	Silver Linings Playbook	Dallas–Fort Worth Film Critics Association	Best Actress	Runner-up	
2013	Silver Linings Playbook	National Society of Film Critics	Best Actress	Runner-up	
2013	Silver Linings Playbook	New York Film Critics Circle	Best Actress	Runner-up (Note: Also for The Hunger Games)	
2013	Silver Linings Playbook	St. Louis Gateway Film Critics Association	Best Actress	Runner-up	
2013	Silver Linings Playbook	Dublin Film Critics' Circle	Best Actress	3rd Place	
2013	Silver Linings Playbook	Chicago Film Critics Association	Best Actress	Nominated	
2013	Silver Linings Playbook	Detroit Film Critics Society	Best Ensemble	Nominated	
2013	Silver Linings Playbook	London Film Critics' Circle	Actress of the Year	Nominated	
2013	Silver Linings Playbook	Online Film Critics Society Awards	Best Actress	Nominated	
2013	Silver Linings Playbook	San Diego Film Critics Society	Best Actress	Nominated	
2013	Silver Linings Playbook	Vancouver Film Critics Circle	Best Actress	Nominated	
2013	Silver Linings Playbook	Washington D.C. Area Film Critics Association	Best Actress	Nominated	
2013	The Hunger Games	Alliance of Women Film Journalists	Best Female Action Star	Won	
2014	American Hustle	Alliance of Women Film Journalists	Best Ensemble Cast	Won	
2014	American Hustle	Detroit Film Critics Society	Best Ensemble	Won	
2014	American Hustle	National Society of Film Critics	Best Supporting Actress	Won	
2014	American Hustle	New York Film Critics Circle	Best Supporting Actress	Won	
2014	American Hustle	New York Film Critics Online	Best Ensemble Cast	Won	
2014	American Hustle	North Texas Film Critics Association	Best Supporting Actress	Won	
2014	American Hustle	San Diego Film Critics Society	Best Performance by an Ensemble	Won	
2014	American Hustle	San Francisco Film Critics Circle	Best Supporting Actress	Won	
2014	American Hustle	Toronto Film Critics Association	Best Supporting Actress	Won	
2014	American Hustle	Vancouver Film Critics Circle	Best Supporting Actress	Won	
2014	American Hustle	Florida Film Critics Circle	Best Supporting Actress	Runner-up	
2014	American Hustle	Dallas–Fort Worth Film Critics Association	Best Supporting Actress	3rd Place	
2014	American Hustle	Alliance of Women Film Journalists	Best Supporting Actress	Nominated	
2014	American Hustle	Chicago Film Critics Association	Best Supporting Actress	Nominated	
2014	American Hustle	Detroit Film Critics Society	Best Supporting Actress	Nominated	
2014	American Hustle	Houston Film Critics Society Awards	Best Supporting Actress	Nominated	
2014	American Hustle	London Film Critics' Circle	Supporting Actress of the Year	Nominated	
2014	American Hustle	Online Film Critics Society Awards	Best Supporting Actress	Nominated	
2014	American Hustle	San Diego Film Critics Society	Best Supporting Actress	Nominated	
2014	American Hustle	St. Louis Gateway Film Critics Association	Best Supporting Actress	Nominated	
2014	American Hustle	Washington D.C. Area Film Critics Association	Best Supporting Actress	Nominated	
2014	American Hustle	Washington D.C. Area Film Critics Association	Best Ensemble	Nominated	
2014	The Hunger Games: Catching Fire	Alliance of Women Film Journalists	Best Female Action Star	Nominated	
2014	Jennifer Lawrence	Alliance of Women Film Journalists	Female Icon	Nominated	
2015	The Hunger Games: Mockingjay – Part 1	Alliance of Women Film Journalists	Best Female Action Star	Nominated	
2015	The Hunger Games: Mockingjay – Part 1	Women Film Critics Circle	Best Female Images in a Movie	Won	
2016	The Hunger Games: Mockingjay – Part 2	Alliance of Women Film Journalists	Best Female Action Star	Nominated	
2016	Jennifer Lawrence	Alliance of Women Film Journalists	Female Icon	Nominated	
2016	Joy	Detroit Film Critics Society	Best Actress	Nominated	
2016	Joy	Detroit Film Critics Society	Best Ensemble	Nominated	
2017	Mother!	Alliance of Women Film Journalists	Most Egregious Age Difference Between The Lead and The Love Interest Award	Nominated	
2017	Mother!	Alliance of Women Film Journalists	Actress Most in Need of a New Agent	Nominated	
2017	Mother!	North Texas Film Critics Association	Best Actress	Nominated	
2019	Red Sparrow	Alliance of Women Film Journalists	Actress Most in Need of a New Agent	Won	
2022	Causeway	Las Vegas Film Critics Society	Best Actress	Nominated	
2025	Die My Love	Florida Film Critics Circle	Best Actress	Runner-up	
2025	Die My Love	Dublin Film Critics' Circle	Best Actress	3rd Place	
2025	Die My Love	Astra Film Awards	Best Actress – Drama	Nominated	
2025	Die My Love	Austin Film Critics Association	Best Actress	Nominated	
2025	Die My Love	Chicago Film Critics Association	Best Actress	Nominated	
2025	Die My Love	Greater Western New York Film Critics Association	Best Actress	Nominated	
2025	Die My Love	International Cinephile Society	Best Actress	Nominated	
2025	Die My Love	Kansas City Film Critics Circle	Best Actress	Nominated	
2025	Die My Love	London Film Critics' Circle	Actress of the Year	Nominated	
2025	Die My Love	New York Film Critics Online	Best Actress	Nominated	
2025	Die My Love	North Carolina Film Critics Association	Best Actress	Nominated	
2025	Die My Love	Phoenix Critics Circle	Best Actress	Nominated	
2025	Die My Love	Puerto Rico Critics Association	Best Actress	Nominated	
2025	Die My Love	Women Film Critics Circle	Best Actress	Nominated	
