= The River Café (Brooklyn) =

Restaurant in Brooklyn, New York

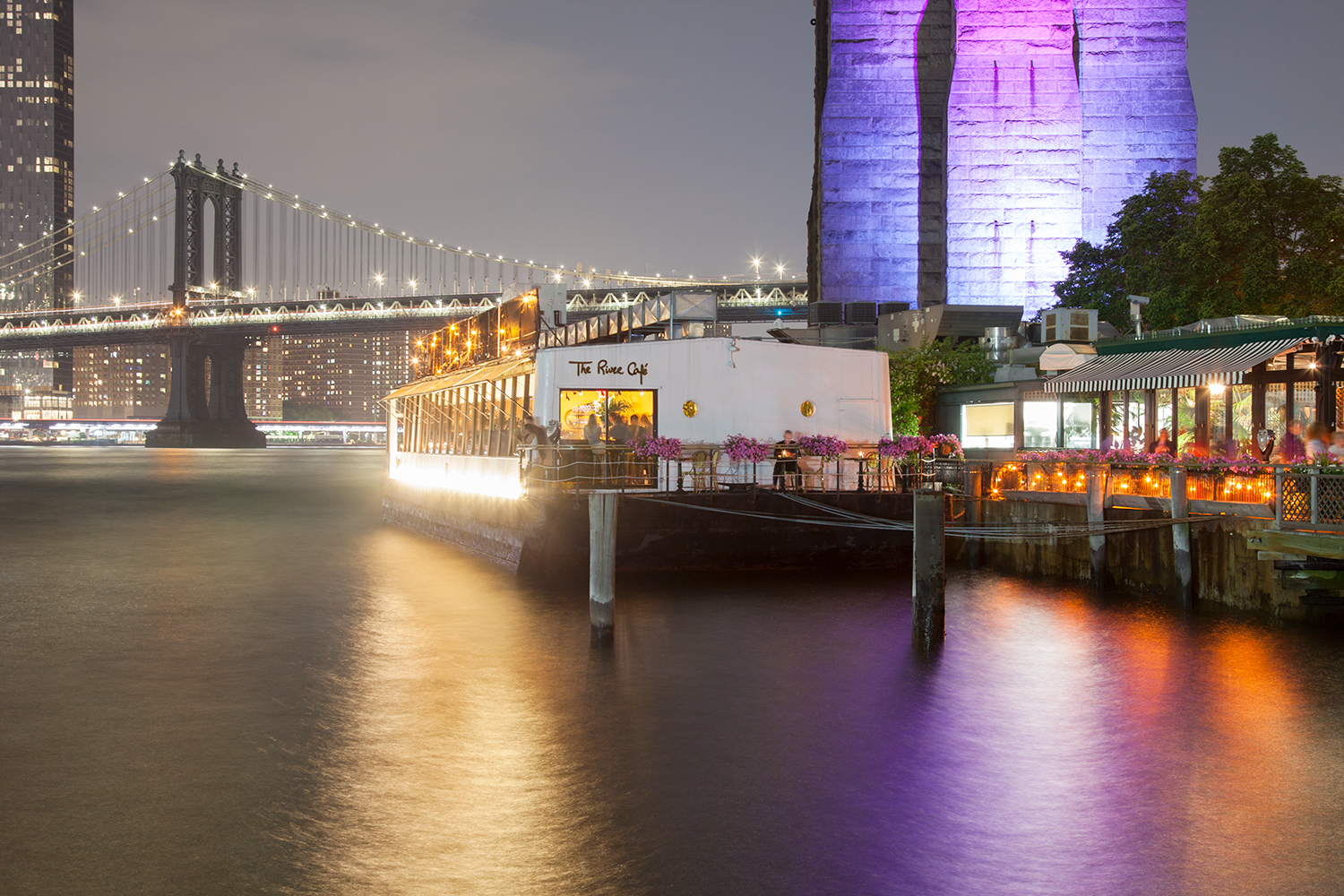
- Interactive map of The River Café

Restaurant information
- Established: 1977
- Head chef: Brad Steelman
- Food type: American cuisine
- Dress code: Jacket required
- Location: One Water Street, Brooklyn, New York, 11201, United States
- Coordinates: 40°42′13.28″N 73°59′41.47″W
- Website: www.rivercafe.com

The River Café is an American cuisine restaurant located on a former coffee barge in the East River under the Brooklyn Bridge in Brooklyn, New York, United States. It has offered its own ferry service from Wall Street. Opened in 1977 by Michael O'Keeffe, who has also owned several other New York City restaurants, it was one of the first fine dining restaurants in the city to promote locally sourced and organic food, American cuisine, and high-end California wines. Heavily damaged due to Hurricane Sandy in fall 2012, it reopened in February 2014.

== History and operations ==
Michael "Buzzy" O'Keeffe, who also operates other venues including Manhattan's Water Club, opened The River Café in summer 1977 on land on the Brooklyn waterfront leased from New York City, after twelve years of obtaining permits and other prep work. In 1981, long before the neighborhood, now known as Dumbo, was accessible via NYC Ferry, the restaurant instituted a house ferry from Wall Street. Its success on a formerly derelict stretch of waterfront influenced the development of the area.

The restaurant pioneered local sourcing, organic and free-range food, and, in an era when New York fine dining restaurants usually offered mostly French wines, offered high-end California wines. It was also one of the first fine dining restaurants in New York to showcase American cuisine.

While staff such as the wine director stayed for more than forty years, The River Café is known for incubating American chefs, including Larry Forgione, Charlie Palmer, David Burke, and Rick Laakkonen. Brad Steelman has been head chef since 2000.

Despite changes to the dining industry as a result of the COVID-19 pandemic, The River Café retains a dress code of jackets required. In 2012, a past and a current employee alleged that the restaurant discriminated against both casually-dressed patrons and those wearing Orthodox Jewish clothing (who are forbidden to order alcohol) by strictly enforcing a minimum charge that was waived for undercover reporters.

In May 2019, actress Jennifer Lawrence and her then-fiancé, Cooke Maroney, held their engagement party at The River Café. Several notable figures attended, including actress Emma Stone.

=== Hurricane Sandy ===
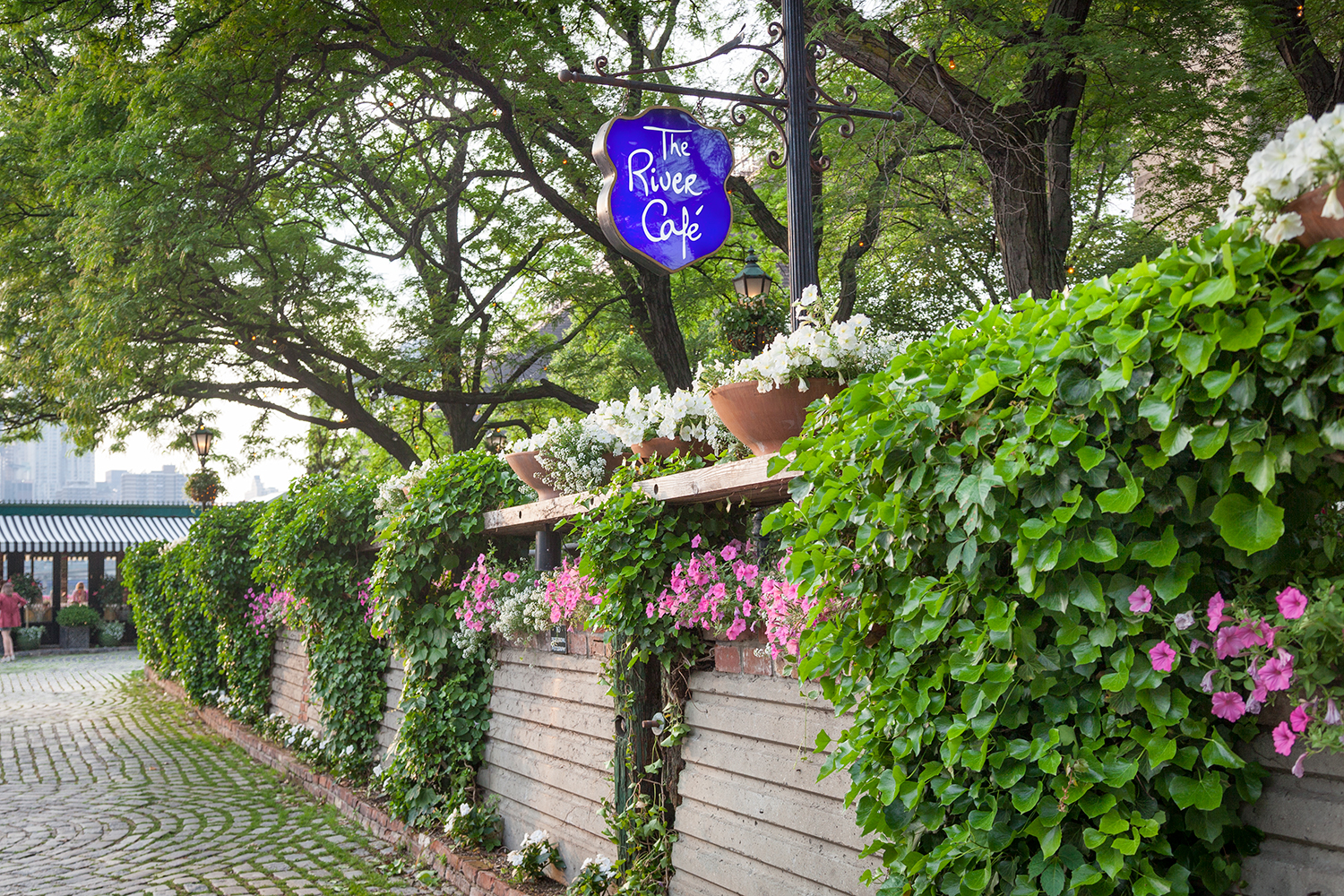
Entrance on Water Street

The restaurant occupies a former coffee barge that rests on an underwater pier in the East River. In October 2012, flooding from Hurricane Sandy caused damage including corroded electrical wiring, lost food and wine, and the destruction of antiques and a piano. Walls also needed replacement after the storm due to mold. The River Café was closed for over a year for repairs, despite hopes that it would reopen in fall 2013, either on the anniversary of the storm or around Thanksgiving. It reopened in February 2014 with a change in its wine focus, and regained its Michelin star that same year. The Cafe lost its star in the 2023 rankings.
