= Excellent Cadaver =

Film and television production company

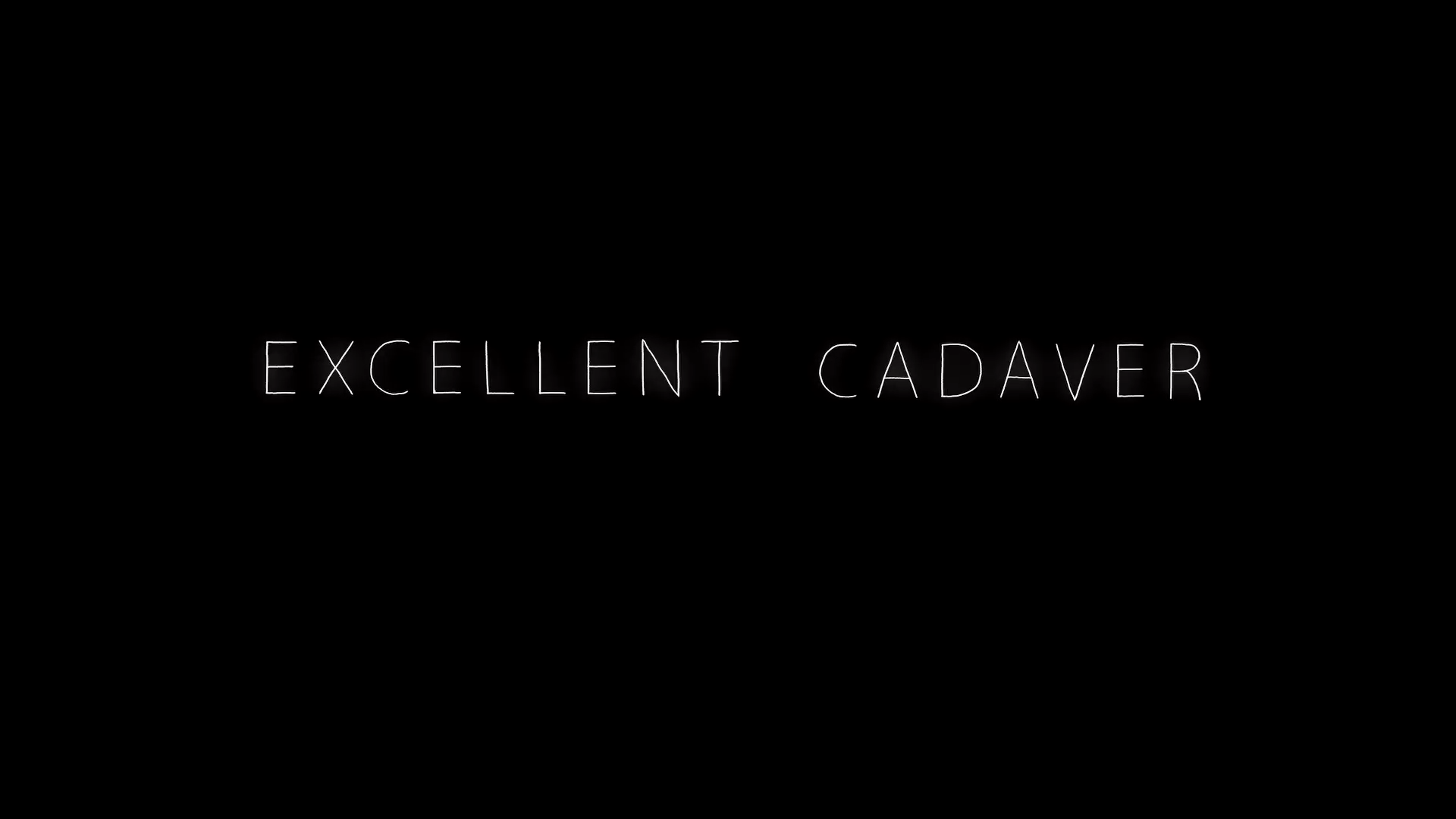
- Type: Private
- Industry: Production company
- Founded: 2018; 8 years ago
- Founder: Jennifer Lawrence
- Headquarters: United States
- Key people: Jennifer Lawrence (CEO)

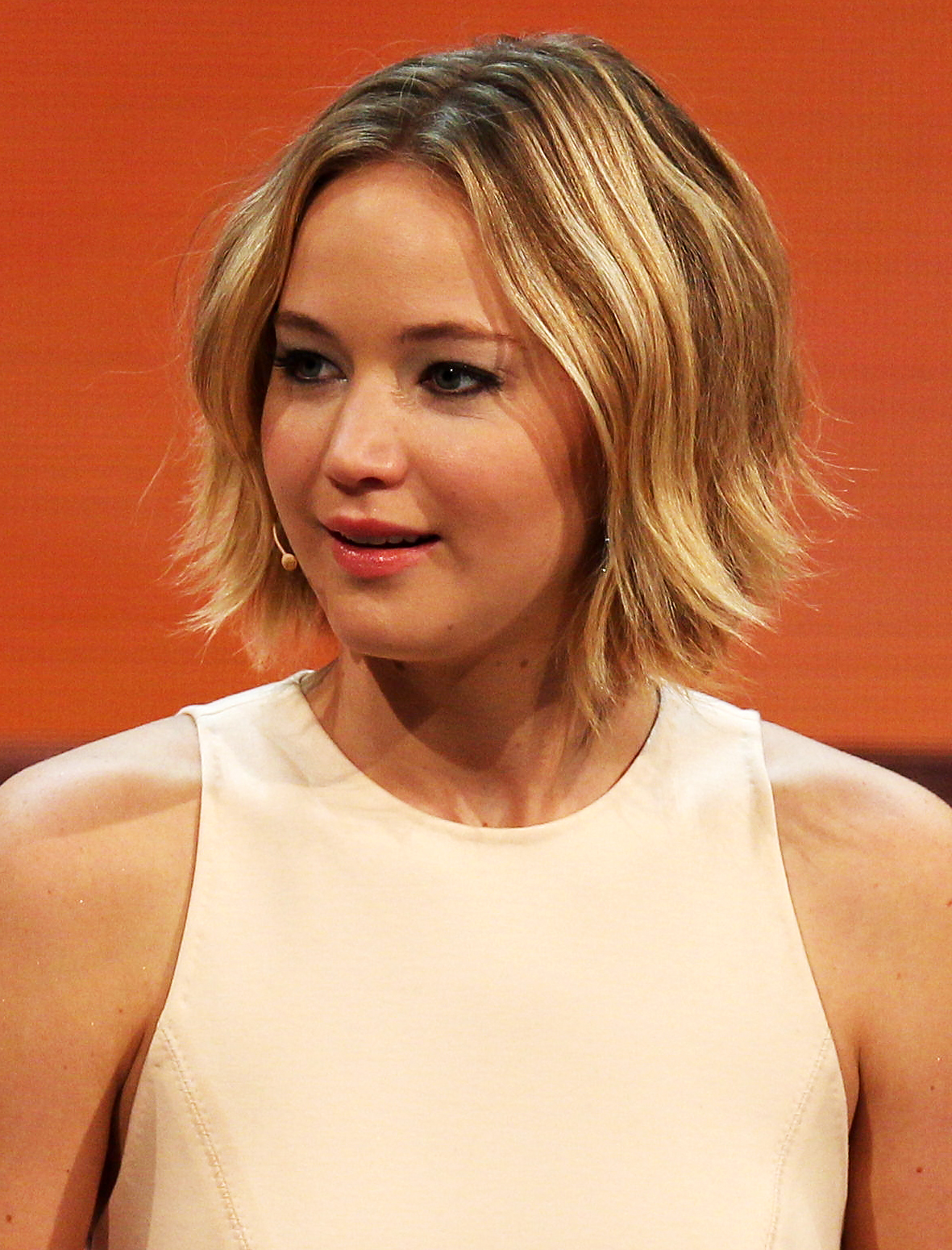
Excellent Cadaver's founder Jennifer Lawrence

Excellent Cadaver is an American film and television production company founded by actress Jennifer Lawrence in 2018. The company has produced the drama Causeway (2022), the comedy No Hard Feelings (2023), and the psychological drama Die My Love (2025), all starring Lawrence.

== History ==
In 2018, Excellent Cadaver was founded by actress Jennifer Lawrence. Lawrence produces with her producing partner, Justine Ciarrocchi.

In October 2018, it was announced that the company had signed a first-look deal with Makeready, who will finance and produce independently with Excellent Cadaver, or through Makeready's finance and production deals with Universal Pictures and Entertainment One.

Filmmaker Don Hertzfeldt was approached by Lawrence to create an animated logo for the company. The logo was featured in the company's first feature film, Causeway. In January 2023, Causeway went on to receive the company's first Academy Award nomination for Brian Tyree Henry in the Best Supporting Actor category.

In 2023, the company’s second feature film, No Hard Feelings, grossed over $89 million at the box office and earned Lawrence a nomination for the Golden Globe Award for Best Actress – Motion Picture Comedy or Musical. That same year, the company's first documentary and third production, Bread and Roses directed by Afghan filmmaker Sahra Mani, about the 2021 Taliban takeover’s effects on women premiered at the 2023 Cannes Film Festival to critical acclaim. The production team went on to receive a Peabody Award and an Emmy nomination for Outstanding Current Affairs Documentary at the 46th News and Documentary Emmy Awards for their work on the documentary.

In 2024, Lawrence—alongside Chelsea and Hillary Clinton—executive produced the documentary Zurawski v Texas about the eponymous court case surrounding reproductive rights in Texas, which premiered at the 51st Telluride Film Festival. Following the release of Zurawski v Texas and the impending presidential election, Lawrence spoke of the importance of using her company to produce projects: "That's the beautiful, amazing thing about film and documentaries. Hearing facts or listening to the news, hearing certain things happen, it's very easy to forget until you actually see human existence and you see what's going on. I think that's when minds can be changed."

In 2025, the company's third feature to be released was Lynne Ramsay's dark comedy Die My Love starring Lawrence, Robert Pattinson, Sissy Spacek, LaKeith Stanfield, and Nick Nolte; produced alongside Martin Scorsese. It premiered at the 2025 Cannes Film Festival, where it was picked up by Mubi for $24 million in what would be the festival's biggest sale of the year. In addition to a number of nominations received by Lawrence for her performance (including a Golden Globe Award), the producing duo received a nomination for the BAFTA Award for Outstanding British Film. The film received three other mentions on the BAFTA longlists and was shortlisted at the Oscars for cinematographer Seamus McGarvey's work on the film.

Lawrence, Ciarrocchi, and Scorsese will re-team on the latter's next feature film, the gothic psychological drama What Happens at Night starring Lawrence, Leonardo DiCaprio, Patricia Clarkson, Mads Mikkelsen, and Jared Harris at Apple Studios.

Additionally, the company is slated to produce the romantic comedy One Month Mark, written by Sophie Fleur de Bruijn, for Apple Studios. The company won the script in a highly competitive bidding war with 40 other producers and production companies, with insiders labeling it as "one of the best rom-com scripts in years." In a Causeway re-team with A24 and Apple, the company will produce The Wives, a murder mystery co-produced by Jeremy O. Harris and Josh Godfrey, inspired by The Real Housewives franchise. The producing duo will adapt Paul B. Rainey's 2023 graphic novel Why Don't You Love Me?, to be written by On Becoming a God in Central Florida creator Robert Funke. Square Peg's Ari Aster, Lars Knudsen, and Emily Hildner will also co-produce the dark comedy, set at A24. Excellent Cadaver will collaborate with Emma Stone's Fruit Tree on developing a Miss Piggy movie for Walt Disney Pictures.

== Filmography ==
=== Released ===
Year	Title	Director	Gross (worldwide)	Notes	Ref.
2022	Causeway	Lila Neugebauer	—N/a	with IAC Films and A24	
2023	Bread and Roses	Sahra Mani	—N/a	—N/a	
2023	No Hard Feelings	Gene Stupnitsky	$87.3 million	with Saks Picture Company, Odenkirk Provissiero Entertainment, and Columbia Pictures	
2024	Zurawski v Texas	Maisie Crowe and Abbie Perrault	—N/a	with HiddenLight Productions and Out of Nowhere	
2025	Die My Love	Lynne Ramsay	$12.2 million	with Black Label Media	

=== Upcoming ===
Year	Title	Director	Notes	Ref.
TBA	What Happens at Night	Martin Scorsese	with Sikelia Productions, Appian Way Productions, StudioCanal, and Apple Studios	

=== In development ===
- One Month Mark (with Chernin Entertainment and Apple Studios)
- The Wives (with bb², A24, and Apple Studios)
- Why Don't You Love Me? (with Square Peg and A24)
- Untitled Miss Piggy film (with Walt Disney Pictures, The Muppets Studio, and Fruit Tree)
