= Jennifer Lawrence =

American actress and film producer (born 1990)

- Lawrence in 2022
- Born: Jennifer Shrader Lawrence; August 15, 1990 (age 36); Louisville, Kentucky, U.S.
- Other name: Jennifer Lawrence Maroney
- Occupations: Actress; producer
- Years active: 2006–present
- Organizations: Excellent Cadaver; Jennifer Lawrence Foundation
- Spouse: Cooke Maroney (m. 2019)
- Children: 2
- Awards: Full list

Signature
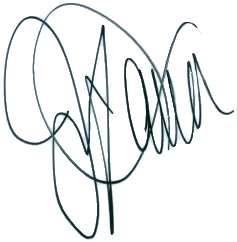

Jennifer Lawrence Maroney (born Jennifer Shrader Lawrence, August 15, 1990) is an American actress and producer. She has starred in both action film franchises and independent dramas, and her films have grossed over $6 billion worldwide. Lawrence was the world's highest-paid actress in 2015 and 2016 and Time named her one of the 100 most influential people in the world.

Lawrence began her career as a teenager with guest roles on television. Her first major role was as a main cast member on the sitcom The Bill Engvall Show (2007–2009). In 2008, she made her film debut with a supporting role in the drama Garden Party and earned the Marcello Mastroianni Award for her performance in The Burning Plain. Her breakthrough came with the role of a poverty-stricken teenager in the independent film Winter's Bone (2010), for which she earned her first Academy Award nomination for Best Actress. Lawrence achieved international stardom for portraying the mutant Mystique in the X-Men film series (2011–2019) and Katniss Everdeen in The Hunger Games film series (2012–present). The latter franchise made her character the highest-grossing action heroine of all time.

Lawrence collaborated with filmmaker David O. Russell on three films, which earned her various accolades. For portraying a troubled young widow in the romance Silver Linings Playbook (2012), she won the Academy Award for Best Actress, becoming the second-youngest winner in the category at age 22. Lawrence also won a BAFTA Award for her supporting role in the black comedy American Hustle (2013) and a Golden Globe Award for portraying businesswoman Joy Mangano in the biopic Joy (2015). She later starred in the sci-fi romance film Passengers (2016), the psychological horror film Mother! (2017), and the spy thriller Red Sparrow (2018) to varying critical and commercial success. After a hiatus, Lawerence returned to acting with the satirical dark comedy Don't Look Up (2021). She has since starred in the drama Causeway (2022), the comedy No Hard Feelings (2023) and the psychological drama Die My Love (2025), all of which she co-produced.

Outside of acting, Lawrence founded the Jennifer Lawrence Foundation in 2015, which advocates for the Boys & Girls Clubs of America and the Special Olympics, and the production company Excellent Cadaver in 2018. She sang lead on the 2014 single "The Hanging Tree", which charted worldwide. Lawrence is a feminist and advocates women's reproductive rights. She is also an active member of the anti-corruption organization RepresentUs.

== Early life ==
Jennifer Shrader Lawrence was born on August 15, 1990, in Louisville, Kentucky. Her father Gary is a construction company owner, and her mother Karen (née Koch), is a summer camp manager. She has two older brothers named Ben and Blaine. Lawrence's parents were not anticipating a child when she was conceived, and her mother once said, "We thought we were finished having kids. We got rid of the baby bed and everything." The family owned a horse farm when Lawrence was a child, and Lawrence owned a horse named Muffin. Her mother raised her to be "tough" like her brothers, as she did not want Lawrence to be "a diva." Karen also refused to let her play with other girls in preschool, as she deemed her "too rough" with them and worried she would hurt them. Lawrence once called herself a "hyper" child. She attended Kammerer Middle School in Louisville and was raised as a Christian.

Lawrence did not enjoy her childhood due to hyperactivity and social anxiety, and considered herself a misfit among her peers. "I didn't have any friends. I remember being kind of lonely," she recalled. Lawrence has said that her anxieties vanished when performing on stage and that acting gave her a sense of accomplishment. Her school activities included cheerleading, softball, field hockey, and basketball; she played on a boys' basketball team coached by her father. She did not enjoy these activities, and recalled in 2015, "There's something about team sports, classes, I didn't take well to it. I didn't like it. … I hated team sports."

Growing up, Lawrence enjoyed horseback riding, and she has an injured tailbone as a result of being thrown from a horse. When her father worked from home, she performed for him, often dressing up as a clown or ballerina. Lawrence had her first acting assignment at age nine, playing a Ninevite prostitute in a church play based on the Book of Jonah. For the next few years, she continued taking parts in church plays and school musicals.

Lawrence was 14 and on a family vacation in New York City when she was spotted on the street by a talent scout, who arranged for her to audition for talent agents. Her mother was not keen on her pursuing an acting career, but she briefly moved her family to New York to let Lawrence read for roles. After her first cold reading, the agents said that hers was the best they had heard from someone so young; however, her mother convinced her that they were lying. Lawrence said her early experiences were difficult because she felt lonely and friendless. She signed with CESD Talent Agency, which convinced her parents to let her audition for roles in Los Angeles. While her mother encouraged her to go into modeling, she insisted on pursuing acting, which she considered a "natural fit" for her abilities, and turned down several modeling offers, though she modeled for Abercrombie & Fitch before beginning an acting career, and the modeling photos were never released. She dropped out of school at 14 without receiving a General Educational Development (GED) or diploma. Lawrence has described herself as "self-educated" and said that her career was her priority. Between her acting jobs in the city, she made regular visits to Louisville, where she was an assistant nurse at her mother's camp.

== Career ==
=== 2006–2011: Early roles and breakthrough ===
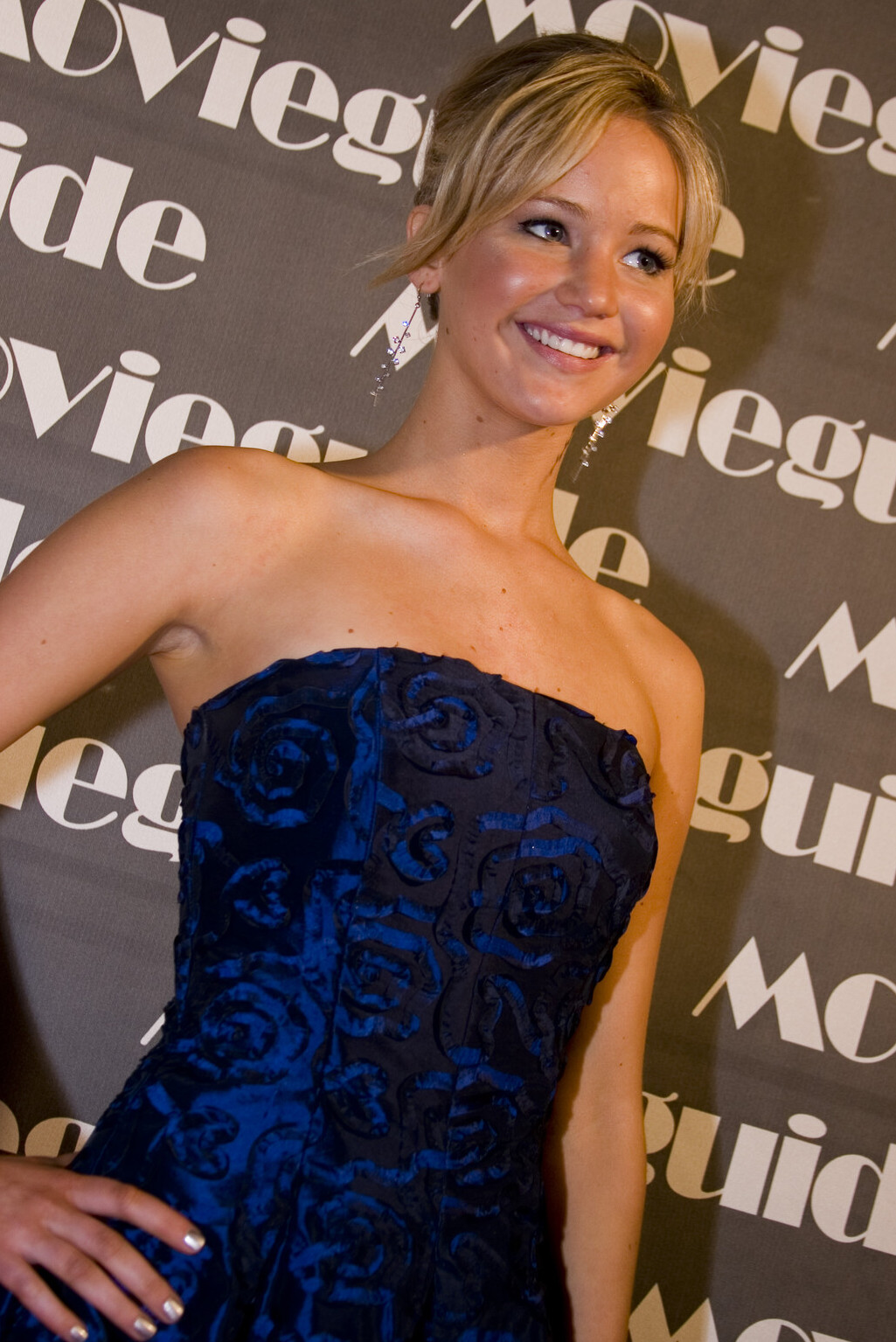
Lawrence at the 2007 Movieguide Awards

Lawrence began her acting career with a minor role in the television pilot Company Town (2006), which was never sold. She followed it with guest roles in several television shows, including Monk (2006) and Medium (2007). She received her first part as a series regular on the TBS sitcom The Bill Engvall Show, in which she played Lauren, the rebellious teenage daughter of a family living in suburban Louisville, Colorado. The series premiered in 2007 and ran for three seasons. Tom Shales of The Washington Post considered her a scene stealer in her part, and David Hinckley of the New York Daily News wrote that she was successful in "deliver[ing] the perpetual exasperation of teenage girls". In 2009 Lawrence won a Young Artist Award for Outstanding Young Performer in a TV Series for the role.

Lawrence made her film debut in the 2008 drama film Garden Party, in which she played a troubled teenager named Tiff. She then appeared in director Guillermo Arriaga's feature film debut The Burning Plain (2008), a drama narrated in a hyperlink format. She was cast as the teenage daughter of Kim Basinger's character, who discovers her mother's extramarital affair. She shared the role with Charlize Theron, who played the older version of her character. Mark Feeney of The Boston Globe described her role as "a thankless task", but Derek Elley of Variety praised her as the production's prime asset. Her performance earned her the Marcello Mastroianni Award for Best Emerging Actress at the 2008 Venice Film Festival. The same year, she appeared in the music video for the song "The Mess I Made" by Parachute. In 2008, she starred in Lori Petty's drama The Poker House as the oldest of three sisters living with a drug-abusing mother. Stephen Farber of The Hollywood Reporter opined that Lawrence "has a touching poise on camera that conveys the resilience of children". She won an Outstanding Performance Award at the Los Angeles Film Festival for her performance in the film.

Lawrence's breakthrough role came in Debra Granik's independent drama Winter's Bone (2010), based on the novel of the same name by Daniel Woodrell. The film featured her as 17-year-old Ree Dolly, a poverty-stricken teenaged girl in the Ozark Mountains who cares for her mentally ill mother and younger siblings while searching for her missing father. She traveled to the Ozarks a week before filming began to live with the family on whom the story was based; in preparation for the role, she learned to fight, skin squirrels, and chop wood. David Denby of The New Yorker asserted that the film "would be unimaginable with anyone less charismatic", and Peter Travers of Rolling Stone wrote that "her performance is more than acting; it's a gathering storm. Lawrence's eyes are a roadmap to what's tearing Ree apart." The production won the Grand Jury Prize at the Sundance Film Festival. The actress was awarded the National Board of Review Award for Breakthrough Performance, and received her first nominations for the Golden Globe Award, SAG Award and Academy Award for Best Actress, becoming the second-youngest Best Actress Oscar nominee at the time.

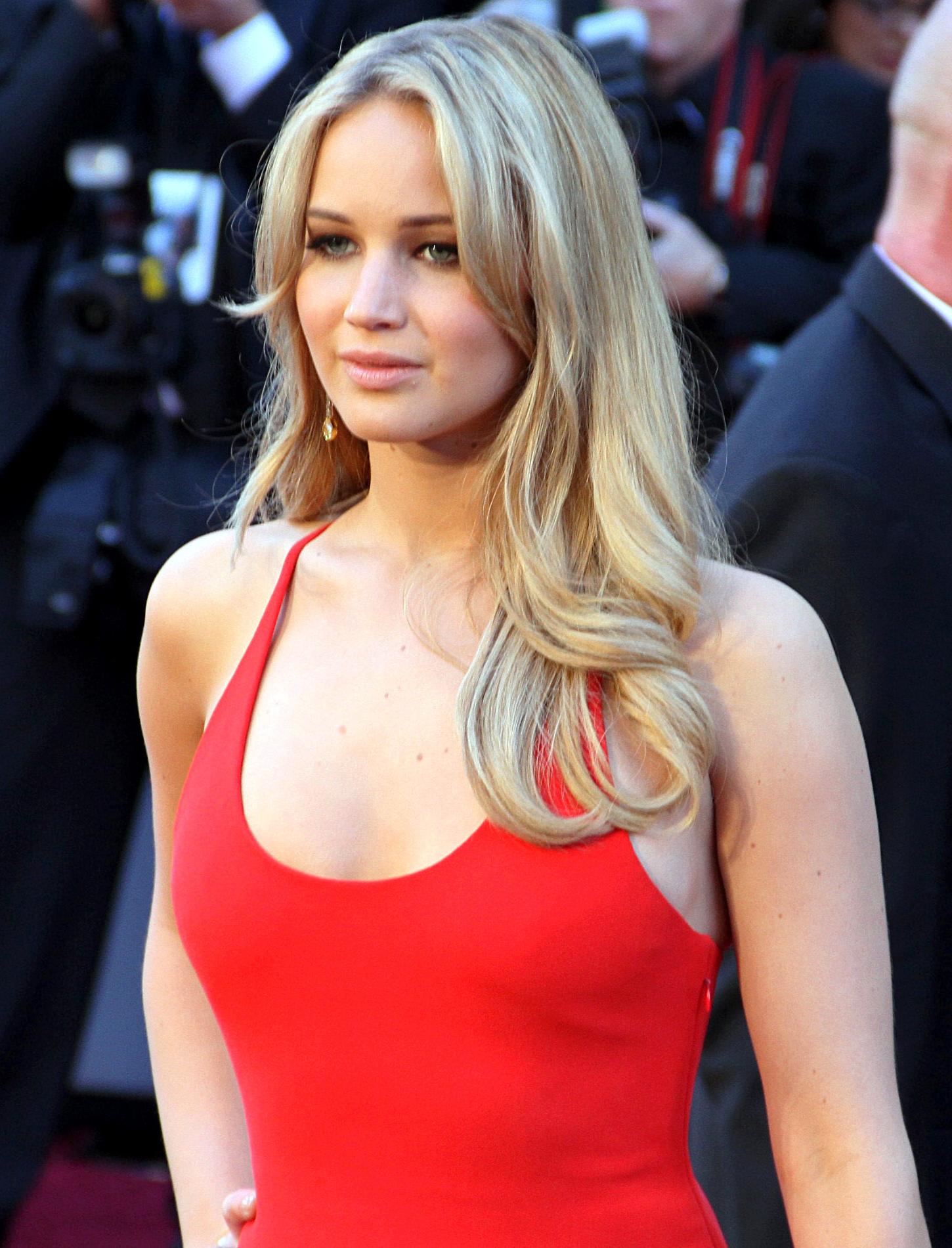
Lawrence at the 83rd Academy Awards in 2011, where she received her first Academy Award nomination for Winter's Bone (2010)

In 2011, Lawrence took on a supporting role in Like Crazy, a romantic drama about long-distance relationships, starring Anton Yelchin and Felicity Jones. Kenneth Turan of the Los Angeles Times considered the film to be an "intensely wrought and immensely satisfying love story" and credited all three performers for "making their [characters'] yearning palpable". She then appeared again with Yelchin in Jodie Foster's The Beaver, alongside Foster and Mel Gibson. Filmed in 2009, the production was delayed by controversy surrounding Gibson and earned less than half of its $21 million budget.

After her dramatic role in Winter's Bone, Lawrence looked for something less serious, and found it with her first high-profile release—Matthew Vaughn's superhero film X-Men: First Class (2011)—a prequel to the X-Men film series. She portrayed the shapeshifting mutant Mystique, a role played by Rebecca Romijn in the earlier films. Vaughn cast Lawrence, as he thought that she would be able to portray the weakness and strength involved in the character's transformation. For the part, Lawrence lost weight and practiced yoga. For Mystique's blue form, she had to undergo eight hours of makeup, where latex pieces and body paint were applied to her otherwise nude body, as Romijn had done on the other films. This process required Lawrence to report to set at 2 a.m. She was intimidated by the role as she admired Romijn. Writing for USA Today, Claudia Puig considered the film to be a "classy re-boot" of the film series, and believed that her "high-spirited performance" empowered the film. With worldwide earnings of $350 million, X-Men: First Class became Lawrence's highest-grossing film at that point.

=== 2012–2015: Rise to prominence ===
In 2012, Lawrence starred as Katniss Everdeen in The Hunger Games, an adaptation of the first book in author Suzanne Collins' trilogy of the same name. Set in a post-apocalyptic future, the series follows the teenage heroine Everdeen as she joins rebel forces against a totalitarian government after winning a brutal, televised annual event. Despite being an admirer of the books, Lawrence was initially hesitant to accept the role because of the film's grand scale. She agreed to the project after her mother convinced her to take the part. She practiced archery, rock and tree climbing, and hand-to-hand combat techniques, and other physically demanding activities for the role. While training for the part, she injured herself running into a wall. The Hunger Games garnered positive reviews, with Lawrence's portrayal of Everdeen being particularly praised; Roger Ebert described the film as "an effective entertainment," and found Lawrence to be "strong and convincing in the central role." Similarly, Todd McCarthy of The Hollywood Reporter called her an "ideal screen actress", believing that she had embodied the Everdeen of the novel, and added that she "anchors [the film] with impressive gravity and presence". With worldwide revenues of over $690 million, The Hunger Games became a top-grossing film featuring a female lead, making Lawrence the highest-grossing action heroine of all time. The film's success established her as a global star.

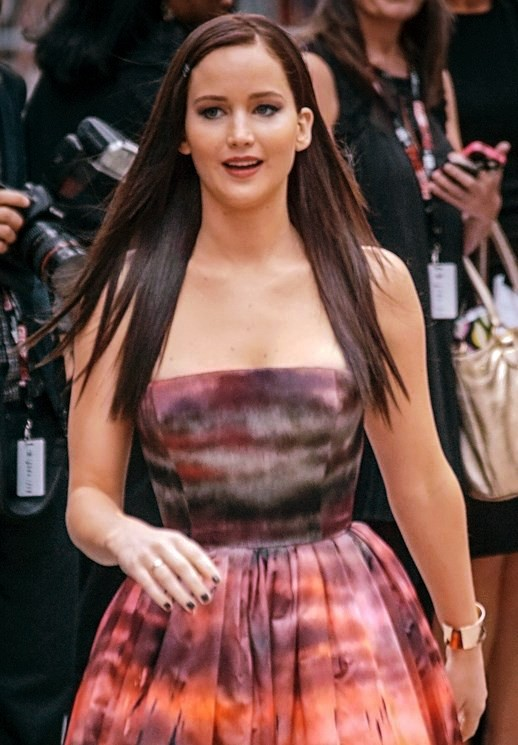
Lawrence attending the premiere of Silver Linings Playbook at the 2012 Toronto International Film Festival

Later in 2012, Lawrence played Tiffany Maxwell, a troubled young widow, in David O. Russell's romantic comedy-drama Silver Linings Playbook. The film is an adaptation of Matthew Quick's novel of the same name, and follows her character as she finds companionship with Pat Solitano Jr. (played by Bradley Cooper), a man with bipolar disorder. Lawrence was drawn to her character's complex personality, explaining, "She was just kind of this mysterious enigma to me because she didn't really fit any basic kind of character profile. Somebody who is very forceful and bullheaded is normally very insecure, but she isn't." While Russell initially found her too young for the part, she convinced him to cast her via a Skype audition. She found herself challenged by Russell's spontaneity as a director, and described working on the project as the "best experience of [her] life". Richard Corliss of Time magazine wrote: "Just 21 when the movie was shot, Lawrence is that rare young actress who plays, who is, grown-up. Sullen and sultry, she lends a mature intelligence to any role." Peter Travers called her "some kind of miracle. She's rude, dirty, funny, foulmouthed, sloppy, sexy, vibrant, and vulnerable, sometimes all in the same scene, even in the same breath." Lawrence won the Golden Globe, SAG Award and the Academy Award for Best Actress, becoming—at age 22—the second-youngest Best Actress Oscar winner. Her final film of the year was alongside Max Thieriot and Elisabeth Shue in Mark Tonderai's critically panned thriller House at the End of the Street.

In January 2013, she hosted an episode of the NBC late-night sketch comedy Saturday Night Live. The Devil You Know, a small-scale production that Lawrence had filmed for in 2005, was her first release of 2013. She then reprised the role of Everdeen in The Hunger Games: Catching Fire, the second installment in the Hunger Games series. While performing the film's underwater stunts, Lawrence suffered from an ear infection that resulted in a brief loss of hearing. Writing for The Village Voice, Stephanie Zacharek believed that the actress' portrayal of Everdeen made her an ideal role model, stating that "there's no sanctimony or pretense of false modesty in the way Lawrence plays her." With box office earnings of $865 million, Catching Fire remains her highest-grossing film.

In the same year, Lawrence took on a supporting role in David O. Russell's ensemble black comedy crime American Hustle as Rosalyn Rosenfeld, the neurotic wife of con man Irving Rosenfeld (played by Christian Bale). Inspired by the Federal Bureau of Investigation (FBI)'s Abscam sting operation, the film is set against the backdrop of political corruption in 1970s New Jersey. She did little research for the role, and based her performance on knowledge of the era from films and television shows she had watched. Geoffrey Macnab of The Independent found Lawrence to be "brilliant", "funny and acerbic" in her part, and highlighted an improvised scene in which she aggressively kisses her husband's mistress (played by Amy Adams) on the lips. For her performance, she won the Golden Globe and BAFTA Award for Best Supporting Actress, and received her third Screen Actors Guild Award and Academy Award nominations, her first in the supporting category. This made her the youngest actor to accrue three Oscar nominations.

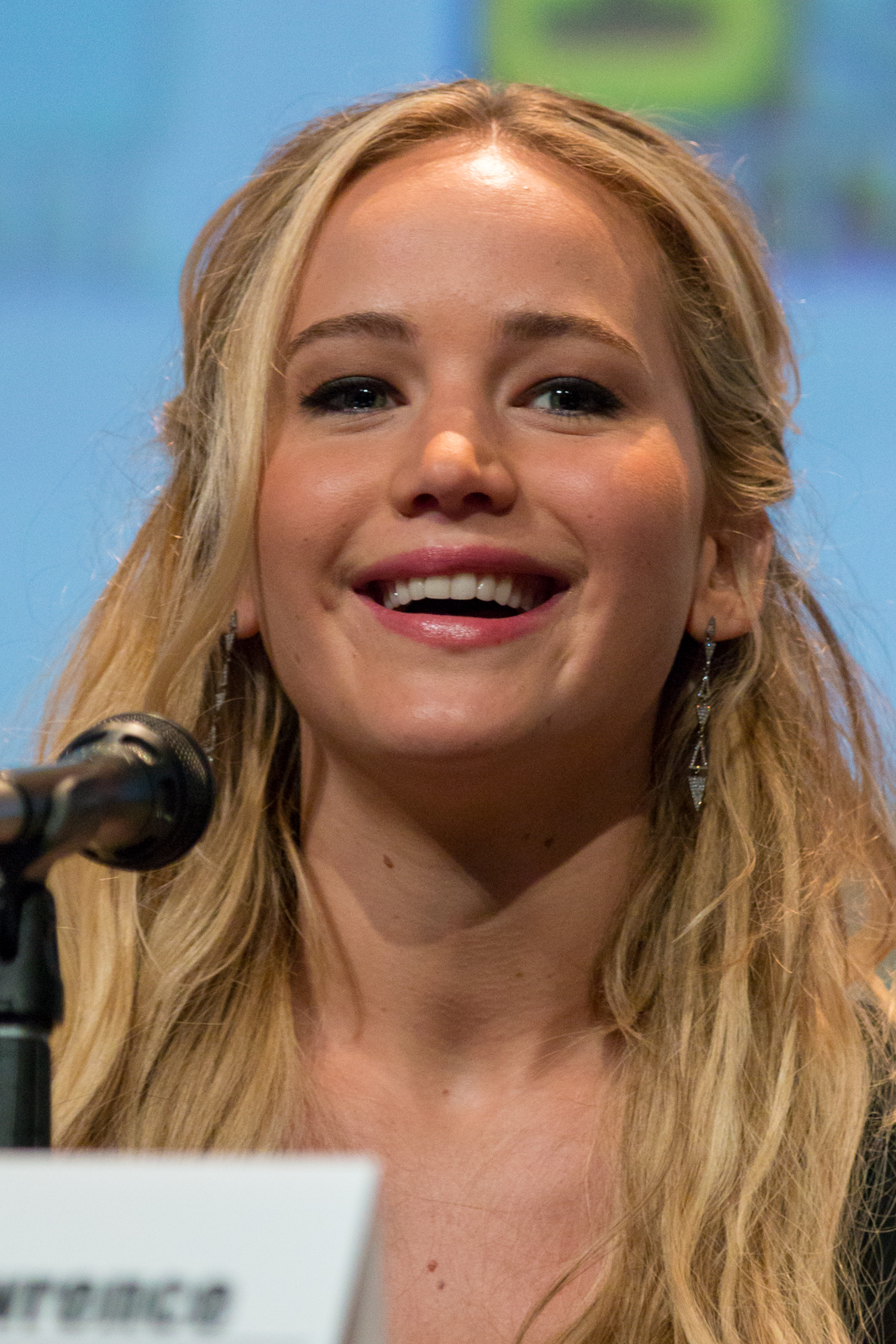
Lawrence promoting The Hunger Games: Mockingjay – Part 2 at the 2015 San Diego Comic-Con

Lawrence played Serena Pemberton in Susanne Bier's depression-era drama Serena (2014), based on the novel of the same name by Ron Rash. In the film, she and her husband, George (played by Bradley Cooper), become involved in criminal activities after realizing they cannot have children. The project was filmed in 2012, and was released in 2014 to poor reviews. Lawrence then reprised the role of Mystique in X-Men: Days of Future Past, which served as a sequel to both X-Men: The Last Stand (2006) and X-Men: First Class (2011). The film received positive reviews and grossed $748.1 million worldwide, becoming the highest-grossing film in the X-Men series to that point. Justin Chang of Variety praised her look in the film but thought she had little to do but "glower, snarl and let the f/x artists do their thing".

Lawrence's next two releases were the final installments of The Hunger Games film series, Mockingjay – Part 1 (2014) and Part 2 (2015). For the soundtrack of the former film, she recorded the song "The Hanging Tree", which charted on multiple international singles charts. While filming a scene in a tunnel for Part 2, a fog machine malfunctioned and released an excessive amount of fog, nearly suffocating Lawrence. She was carried out by a rescue crew. In a review of the final installment in the series, Manohla Dargis of The New York Times drew similarities between Everdeen's journey as a rebel leader and Lawrence's rise to stardom, stating that the actress "now inhabits the role as effortlessly as breathing, partly because, like all great stars, she seems to be playing a version of her 'real' self." Both films grossed over $650 million worldwide.

Lawrence worked with David O. Russell for the third time on the biopic Joy (2015), in which she played the eponymous character, a troubled single mother who becomes a successful businesswoman after inventing the Miracle Mop. During production in Boston, the press reported on a disagreement between Lawrence and Russell that resulted in a "screaming match". She said their friendship made it easier for them to disagree, because people fight when they really love each other. The film was not as well-received as their previous collaborations, but Lawrence's performance was unanimously praised; critic Richard Roeper found it to be her best work since Winter's Bone, terming it "a wonderfully layered performance that carries the film through its rough spots and sometime dubious detours." She won her third Golden Globe for it, and was nominated for another Academy Award for Best Actress, becoming the youngest actor in history to accrue four Oscar nominations.

=== 2016–2020: Mixed success ===
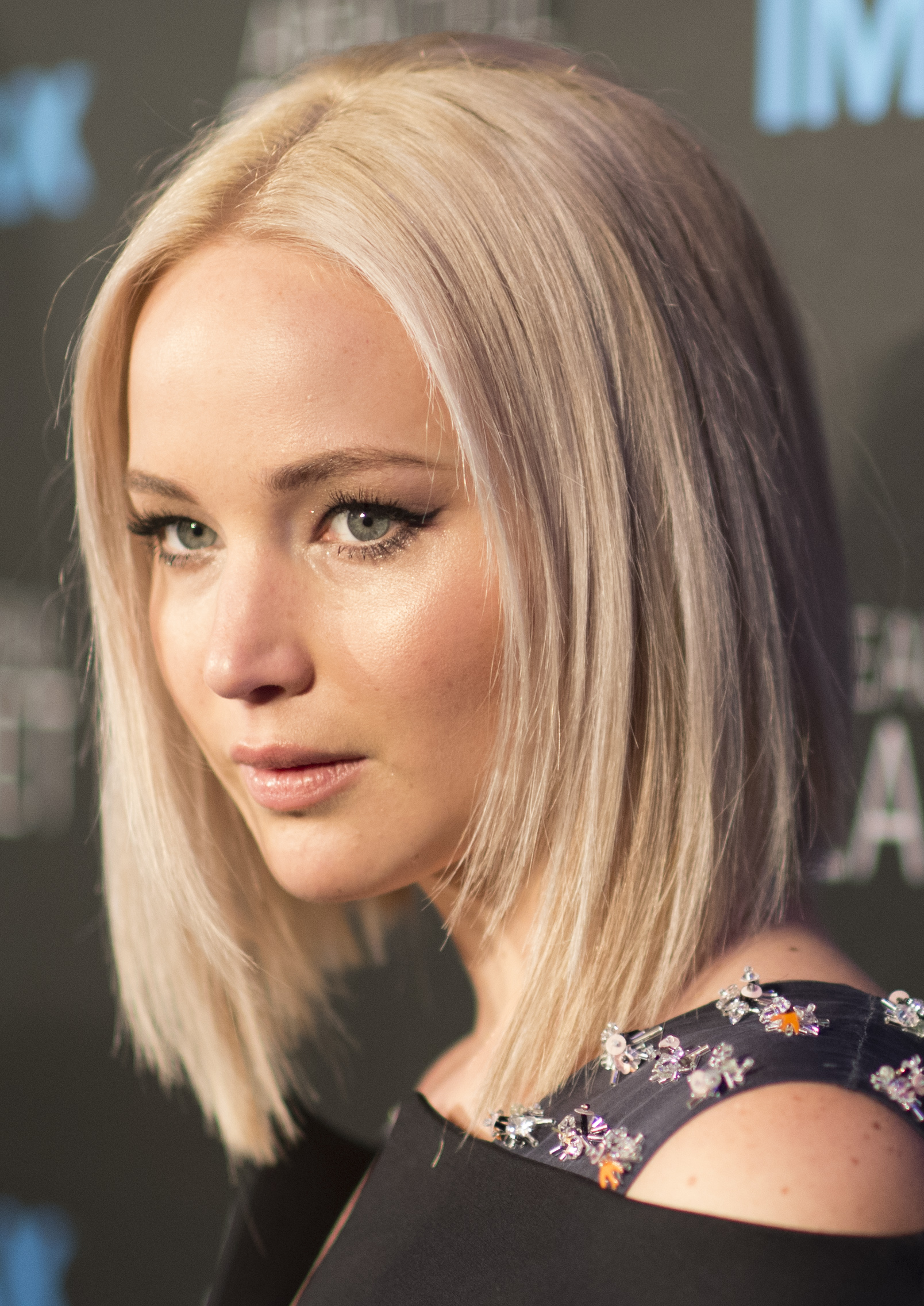
Lawrence at the world premiere for A Beautiful Planet in 2016

Lawrence began 2016 by providing the narration for A Beautiful Planet, a documentary film that explores Earth from the International Space Station. She played Mystique for the third time in X-Men: Apocalypse (2016). The film received mixed reviews, with a consensus that it was overfilled with action that detracted from the story's themes and the cast's performances. Helen O'Hara of Empire deemed it a letdown from the previous installments of the series and criticized Lawrence for making her character too grim. Despite this, she was awarded Favorite Movie Actress at the 43rd People's Choice Awards. Lawrence was paid $20 million to star in the science fiction romance Passengers (2016), and received top billing over co-star Chris Pratt. The film featured Pratt and Lawrence as two individuals who wake up ninety years too soon from an induced hibernation on a spaceship bound for a new planet. She felt nervous performing her first sex scene and kissing a married man (Pratt) onscreen; she drank alcohol to prepare herself for filming those scenes. Passengers was met with underwhelming reviews, much to the surprise of its cast and crew, but Lawrence initially defended the film by calling it a "tainted, complicated love story." She later expressed regret over starring in the film.

Darren Aronofsky's psychological horror film Mother! was Lawrence's sole release of 2017. She played a young wife who experiences trauma when her home is invaded by unexpected guests. Lawrence spent three months rehearsing the film in a warehouse in Brooklyn, despite her reluctance to rehearsals in her previous assignments. The intense role proved grueling for her; she was put on supplemental oxygen when she hyperventilated one day, and also dislocated a rib. Mother! polarized audiences and prompted mass walkouts. The film was better received by critics; Walter Addiego of the San Francisco Chronicle labeled it "assaultive" and a "deliberate test of audience endurance", and credited Lawrence for "never allow[ing] herself to be reduced simply to a howling victim."

The following year, she starred as Dominika Egorova, a Russian spy who makes contact with a mysterious Central Intelligence Agency (CIA) agent (played by Joel Edgerton), in Francis Lawrence's espionage thriller Red Sparrow, based on Jason Matthews' novel of the same name. In preparation for the part, she learned to speak in a Russian accent and trained in ballet for four months. Having been the victim of a nude photo hack, the actress found herself challenged by the sexuality in her role but said that performing the nude scenes made her feel empowered. Eric Kohn of IndieWire disliked the film's denouement, but praised the performances of Lawrence and Charlotte Rampling, remarking that "the considerable talent on display is [the film's] constant saving grace." In 2019, Lawrence made her fourth and final appearance as Mystique, in the superhero film Dark Phoenix, which emerged as a critical and box-office failure.

=== 2021–present: Mainstream resurgence ===
Following roles in a series of mixed-reviewed films, Lawrence took a small break from acting. She felt unsatisfied with her films, wanted to avoid media scrutiny, and focused on domestic activities during this period. Wanting to work with director Adam McKay since she was 19, Lawrence returned in 2021 in his Netflix film Don't Look Up for a reported fee of $25 million. A "slapstick apocalypse", the film had her and costar Leonardo DiCaprio play two astronomers attempting to warn humanity about an extinction-level asteroid. For the role, Lawrence received a red dye job and an undercut. In an interview with Vogue, she said that she extensively researched the typical look of aspiring astrophysicists. Reviews for the film were mixed, but critics mostly praised the performances of Lawrence and DiCaprio, who were described as "powerhouse" by Ian Sandwell of Digital Spy and "a delight to watch" by Saibal Chatterjee of NDTV. Lawrence earned a fifth Golden Globe nomination for the film. It broke the record for the most views, 152 million hours in a single week in Netflix history, and ranks as the platform's second most-watched film within 28 days of release.

Lawrence at the 2022 Toronto International Film Festival

Lawrence starred in Lila Neugebauer's independent drama Causeway (2022), playing a soldier suffering from a brain injury. She also produced the film under her company, Excellent Cadaver, which she had formed in 2018. After starring in several big-budget films, she was drawn to the "slow melody of a character-driven story". Comparing it to her work in Winter's Bone, Allison Wilmore of Vulture opined that the film "is a welcome reminder of how compelling Lawrence can be, as well as a promising indication that she's willing to seek out smaller projects and work with emerging directors". Under Excellent Cadaver, Lawrence produced Bread and Roses (2023), a documentary film from director Sahra Mani about Afghan women under Taliban rule. Keen to work in a comedy, Lawrence accepted her friend Gene Stupnitsky's offer to star in his sex comedy No Hard Feelings (2023), which she also produced. She played a young woman facing bankruptcy who accepts a Craigslist posting from wealthy parents to date their introverted 19-year-old son (played by Andrew Barth Feldman). Reviewers had favorable opinions on the film and appreciated Lawrence's comic timing. She received another Golden Globe nomination for her performance.

After executive producing the documentary Zurawski v Texas (2024), Lawrence next produced and starred in Die My Love (2025), a thriller directed by Lynne Ramsay, which premiered at the Cannes Film Festival. Her performance garnered acclaim from critics, some of whom declared it was a return to form. Tim Grierson of Screen International considered Lawrence to be "the match that lights Lynne Ramsay's gripping, slow-burn fifth feature," and praised her ability to give "a volcanic performance that is nonetheless very controlled, avoiding melodramatic theatrics." That same year, Lawrence was honored for her contributions to cinema with the Donostia Award at the San Sebastián International Film Festival, becoming the youngest recipient in the award's history.

She will reprise her role as Katniss Everdeen in The Hunger Games: Sunrise on the Reaping, set to release in November 2026. She will portray the mafia informant Arlyne Brickman and Hollywood talent agent Sue Mengers in Paolo Sorrentino's film adaptation of Teresa Carpenter's book Mob Girl and an untitled biopic, respectively. Lawrence will additionally star in and produce Luca Guadagnino's film adaptation of the novel Burial Rites, about the last woman to be executed for murder in Iceland. She is attached to star in the upcoming Apple Studios and A24 mystery film The Wives.

== Artistry and public image ==
In 2012, the review website IndieWire described Lawrence's off-screen persona as "down-to-earth, self-deprecating, unaffected". Adam McKay, who directed Lawrence in Don't Look Up, considered her "a strong, funny truth-teller". "No one has more beautiful anger than Jen," McKay said. "When she unleashes, it is a sight to behold." An IGN writer described her as a "sharp", "funny" and "quirky" actress who liked to "stay grounded" despite her considerable success. Lawrence has said she finds acting "stupid" in comparison to life-saving professions like doctors, and therefore does not believe in being "cocky" about her accomplishments.

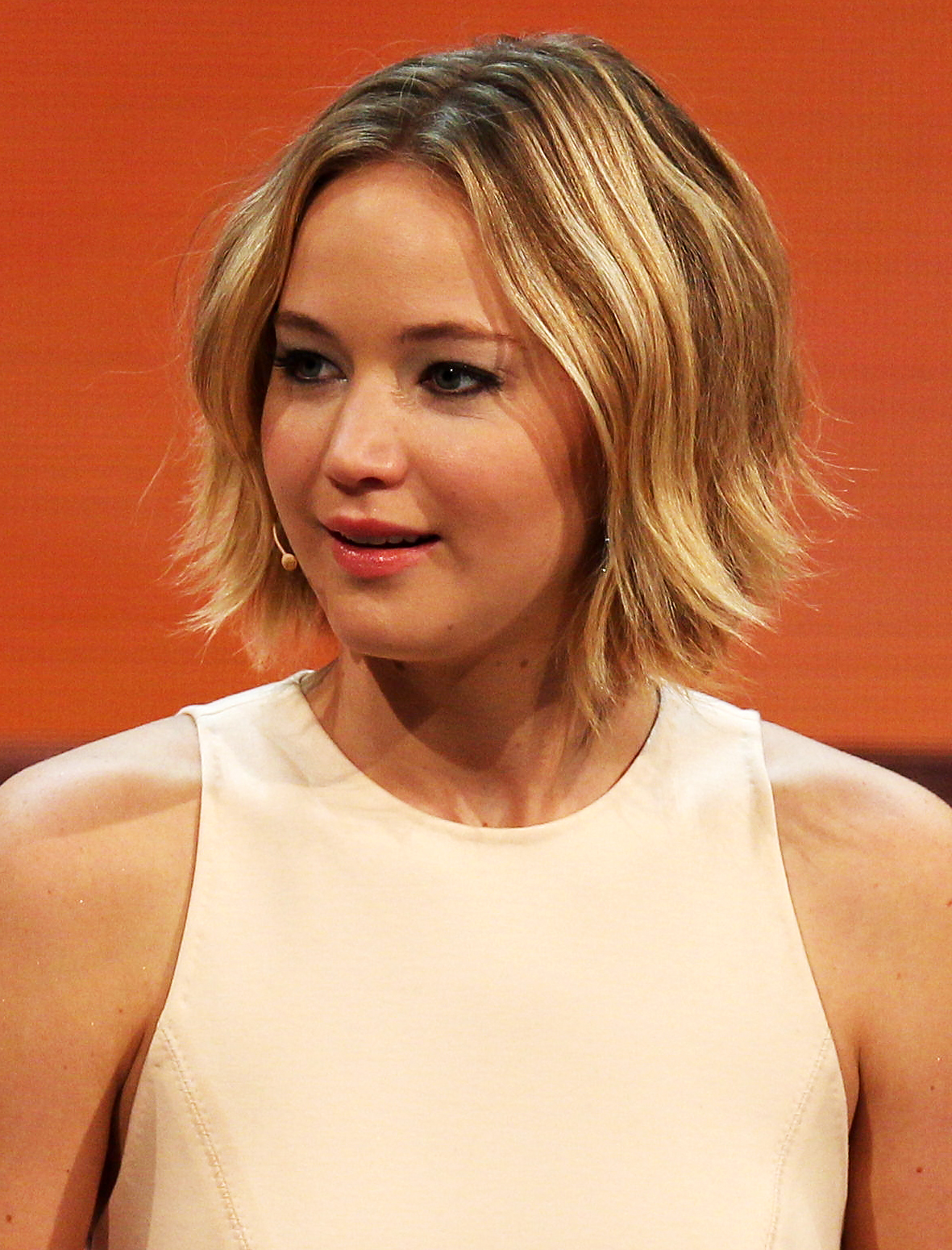
Lawrence in 2014

In 2012, Rolling Stone called Lawrence "the most talented young actress in America". Her The Hunger Games co-star Donald Sutherland found her an "exquisite and brilliant actor" and favorably compared her craft to that of Laurence Olivier. David O. Russell, who directed Lawrence in Silver Linings Playbook, American Hustle and Joy, has said that her acting "is effortless and she makes it look easy". She has played roles in both high-profile, mainstream productions and low-budget independent films, and appeared in a range of film genres. Lawrence did not study acting and has not been involved in professional theater. She bases her acting approach on her observations of people around her. Lawrence said in 2010 that she did not "invest any of [her] real emotions" or take home any of her characters' pain. She went on to say that she doesn't "even take it to craft services" and has never shared her characters' experiences, relying instead on her imagination: "I can't go around looking for roles that are exactly like my life." Lawrence also added "If it ever came down to the point where, to make a part better, I had to lose a little bit of my sanity, I wouldn't do it. I would just do comedies."

Lawrence has become one of the world's highest-paid actresses. The Daily Telegraph reported in 2014 that she was earning $10 million per film. In 2013, Time magazine named her one of the 100 most influential people in the world, Elle labeled her the most powerful woman in the entertainment business, and Forbes ranked her as the second most powerful actress, behind only Angelina Jolie. In 2014, Forbes listed Lawrence as the second-highest-paid actress in the world with earnings of $34 million and named her as the most powerful actress, ranking at number 12 on the magazine's Celebrity 100 list. She appeared on the list again in 2015 and 2016. In 2015, Lawrence was named "Entertainer of the Year" by Entertainment Weekly—a title she also won in 2012—and was recognized as the highest-grossing action heroine in Guinness World Records for starring in The Hunger Games series. In 2015 and 2016, Forbes ranked her as the world's highest-paid actress, with annual earnings of $52 million and $46 million, respectively. In the following two years, it ranked her as the world's third and fourth highest-paid actress, with respective earnings of $24 million and $18 million. The Hollywood Reporter listed Lawrence among the 100 most powerful people in entertainment from 2016 to 2018. As of 2019, her films have grossed over $6 billion worldwide.

Lawrence appeared on Victoria's Secret's listing of the "Sexiest Up-and-Coming Bombshell" in 2011, People's Most Beautiful People in 2011 and 2013, Maxim's Hot 100 from 2011 to 2014, and was placed at number one on FHM's 100 Sexiest Women list in 2014. From 2013 to 2015, she was featured on Glamour's annual listing of the best dressed women, topping the list in 2014. During Raf Simons's tenure at Dior, Lawrence became a celebrity ambassador for the brand, appearing in advertisement campaigns for its fashion and perfumes. She frequently wears Dior to red carpet events such as film premieres and award ceremonies. She wore a custom Dior bridal gown on her wedding day.

== Political views and activism ==
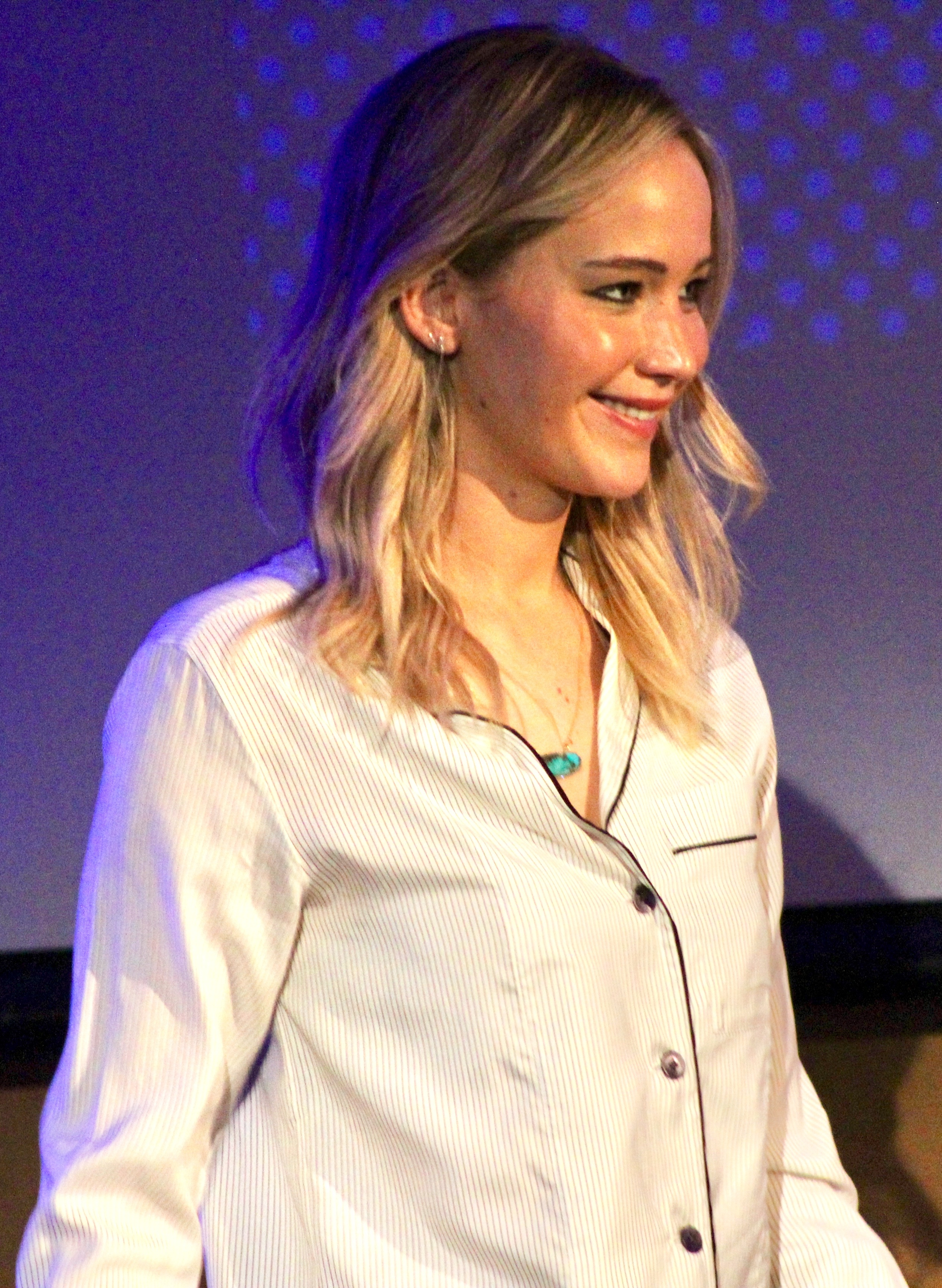
Lawrence at Tulane University in 2018

Having been raised by conservative Republican parents, Lawrence voted for John McCain in the 2008 presidential election. She joined the Democratic Party after her acting career took her to other countries and it became apparent to her that not enough money ever seemed to reach those who most needed it. "Nobody likes to see half their paycheck go away," she said, but "for the greater good, I guess it makes sense." Lawrence also said that during Barack Obama's presidency, she realized that voting Republican was voting against her own rights. Lawrence strongly opposed Donald Trump's presidency, stating in 2015 that his election would "be the end of the world". She endorsed Joe Biden and Kamala Harris in 2020 and 2024, respectively.

Lawrence identifies as a feminist, a concept she argues should not intimidate people "because it just means equality". She has promoted body positivity among women. In 2015, Lawrence wrote an essay for Lenny Letter criticizing the gender pay gap in Hollywood, describing her own experiences in the industry, such as receiving lesser pay for her work on American Hustle in comparison to her male co-stars. Lawrence is a supporter of the LGBTQ+ community. During a speech at the 2024 GLAAD Media Awards, she criticized conversion therapy for being ineffective by recounting that her "first love" was gay, and added "I tried to convert him for years". In a 2015 interview with Vogue, Lawrence condemned Kentucky county clerk Kim Davis for her opposition to same-sex marriage. She supports abortion rights, attending the Rally for Abortion Justice in Washington, D.C. in 2021 while pregnant. Standing alongside Amy Schumer, Lawrence held a sign that read "Women can't be free if they don't control their bodies."

Lawrence joined the Academy of Motion Picture Arts and Sciences in 2011. She has lent her support to charitable organizations such as the World Food Programme, Feeding America, and the Thirst Project. Along with her The Hunger Games co-stars Josh Hutcherson and Liam Hemsworth, she partnered with the United Nations to publicize poverty and hunger. Lawrence organized an early screening of The Hunger Games: Catching Fire (2013) to benefit Saint Mary's Center, a disabilities organization in Louisville, and raised more than $40,000 for the cause. She partnered with the charity broadcast network Chideo to raise funds for the 2015 Special Olympics World Summer Games by screening her film Serena (2014). Lawrence also collaborated with Omaze to host a fundraising contest for the games as part of the premiere of The Hunger Games: Mockingjay – Part 1 (2014).

During 2015, she teamed with Hutcherson and Hemsworth for Prank It FWD, a charitable initiative to raise money for the nonprofit organization DoSomething. That year, she also launched the Jennifer Lawrence Foundation, which supports charities such as the Boys & Girls Clubs of America and the Special Olympics. In 2016, she donated $2 million to the Kosair Children's Hospital in Louisville to set up a cardiac intensive care unit named after her foundation. She is a board member of RepresentUs, a nonprofit seeking to pass anti-corruption laws in the United States. In 2018, she collaborated with 300 women in Hollywood to set up the Time's Up initiative to protect women from harassment and discrimination and took part in the 2018 Women's March in Los Angeles. In 2018, Lawrence spoke out in support of retaining ranked-choice voting in Maine.

At a press conference for Die My Love, she answered reporters' questions about the conflict in Gaza by describing the situation as "no less than a genocide" and saying it "terrified" her. Lawrence urged attendees to "stay focused on who is responsible" rather than directing anger at actors and artists. The comment was an apparent reference to a recent letter signed by nearly 4,000 film industry workers pledging to not work with certain Israeli film companies which, according to the letter, had been "implicated in the genocide and apartheid against the Palestinian people." She also expressed her sadness over the state of American political discourse and the normalization of politicians lying to children. The questions were asked despite a festival moderator attempting to steer reporters away from political topics.

== Personal life ==
In 2017, Lawrence called herself spiritual but not religious, while rejecting the label of atheist. Due to her upbringing in a Christian family, she continues to pray out of habit, "just not to anyone specific", adding that arguing about God "is ridiculous because none of us have an answer." In an interview with Oprah Winfrey, she recounted praying for her life on an airplane that had experienced an engine failure: "I don't know if you're out there, but if you are, please, please [save] the airplane."

During filming of X-Men: First Class in 2010, Lawrence began dating her co-star Nicholas Hoult. Their relationship ended around the time they wrapped filming X-Men: Days of Future Past, in August 2014. She was one of the victims of the 2014 celebrity nude photo leak, in which several private nude pictures of her were posted online. She emphasized that the photos were never meant to go public, calling the leak a "sex crime" and a "sexual violation", and said that viewers of the images should be ashamed of themselves for "perpetuating a sexual offense". Lawrence said the photos had been intended for Hoult during their relationship, and that unlike other victims of the incident, she did not plan to sue Apple Inc.

While in her 20s, Lawrence became pregnant. She planned to have an abortion but instead miscarried while in Montreal. In September 2016, Lawrence began dating filmmaker Darren Aronofsky after they had met during filming of Mother!. They broke up in November 2017. In 2018, she began a relationship with Cooke Maroney, an art gallery director, after being introduced by actress Laura Simpson. They became engaged in February 2019. Lawrence and Maroney married on October 19, 2019, at the Belcourt of Newport mansion in Rhode Island. She took on the name of Jennifer Lawrence Maroney after getting married. As of May 2019, they reside in the Lower Manhattan area of New York City and Beverly Hills, California. While filming Don't Look Up, Lawrence suffered a second miscarriage and needed a dilation and curettage procedure. She and Maroney have two sons, born in 2022 and 2025.

== Filmography ==
=== Film ===
Key
†	Denotes films that have not yet been released

Year	Title	Role	Notes	Ref.
2008	Garden Party	Tiff		
2008	The Poker House	Agnes		
2008	The Burning Plain	Mariana		
2010	Winter's Bone	Ree Dolly		
2011	Like Crazy	Sam		
2011	The Beaver	Norah		
2011	X-Men: First Class	Raven Darkhölme / Mystique		
2012	The Hunger Games	Katniss Everdeen		
2012	Silver Linings Playbook	Tiffany Maxwell		
2012	House at the End of the Street	Elissa Cassidy		
2013	The Devil You Know	Young Zoe Hughes	Filmed in 2005	
2013	The Hunger Games: Catching Fire	Katniss Everdeen		
2013	American Hustle	Rosalyn Rosenfeld		
2014	X-Men: Days of Future Past	Raven Darkhölme / Mystique		
2014	Serena	Serena Pemberton		
2014	The Hunger Games: Mockingjay – Part 1	Katniss Everdeen		
2015	The Hunger Games: Mockingjay – Part 2	Katniss Everdeen		
2015	Joy	Joy Mangano		
2016	A Beautiful Planet	Narrator	Documentary film	
2016	X-Men: Apocalypse	Raven Darkhölme / Mystique		
2016	Passengers	Aurora Lane		
2017	Mother!	Mother		
2018	Red Sparrow	Dominika Egorova		
2019	Dark Phoenix	Raven Darkhölme / Mystique		
2021	Don't Look Up	Kate Dibiasky		
2022	Causeway	Lynsey	Also producer	
2023	Bread and Roses	Producer	Documentary film	
2023	No Hard Feelings	Maddie Barker	Also producer	
2024	Zurawski v Texas	Executive producer	Documentary film	
2025	Die My Love	Grace	Also producer	
2026	The Hunger Games: Sunrise on the Reaping	Katniss Everdeen		
TBA	What Happens at Night †	The Woman	Post-production; also producer	

=== Television ===
Year	Title	Role	Notes
2006	Monk	Mascot	Episode: "Mr. Monk and the Big Game"
2007	Cold Case	Abby Bradford	Episode: "A Dollar, a Dream"
2007–2008	Medium	Young Allison / Claire Chase	2 episodes
2007–2009	The Bill Engvall Show	Lauren Pearson	Main role
2013	Saturday Night Live	Herself (host)	Episode: "Jennifer Lawrence/The Lumineers"
2017	Jimmy Kimmel Live!	Herself (host)	Episode: "November 2, 2017"

=== Music videos ===
Year	Title	Artist	Role	Ref.
2010	"The Mess I Made"	Parachute	Young Woman	

== Accolades ==
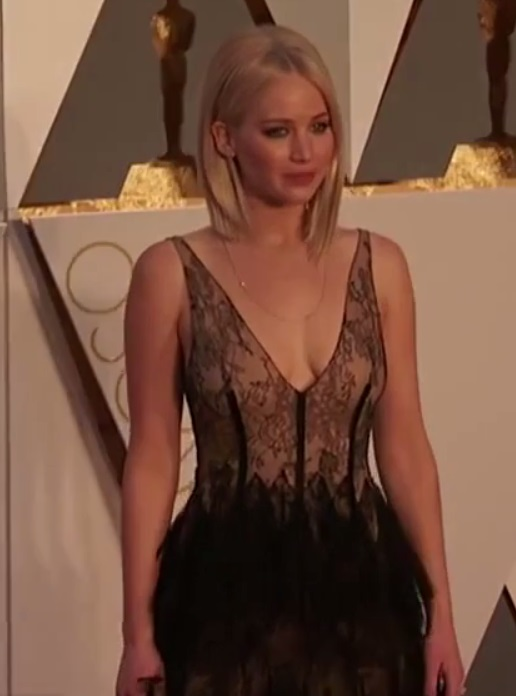
Lawrence at the 2016 Academy Awards, where she was nominated for Joy

Lawrence has been recognized by the Academy of Motion Picture Arts and Sciences for the following performances:

- 83rd Academy Awards: Best Actress, nomination, for Winter's Bone (2010)
- 85th Academy Awards: Best Actress, win, for Silver Linings Playbook (2012)
- 86th Academy Awards: Best Supporting Actress, nomination, for American Hustle (2013)
- 88th Academy Awards: Best Actress, nomination, for Joy (2015)

She has won three Golden Globe Awards: Best Actress – Comedy or Musical for Silver Linings Playbook (2012) and Joy (2015), and Best Supporting Actress for American Hustle (2013). She also won a BAFTA Award for Best Actress in a Supporting Role for American Hustle.
