= Cooke Maroney =

American art gallery director (born 1984)

- Born: July 3, 1984 (age 42); New York City, U.S.
- Education: New York University (BA)
- Occupation: Art gallery director
- Spouse: Jennifer Lawrence (m. 2019)
- Children: 2

Cooke Maroney (born July 3, 1984) is an American art gallery director. He has served as the director of Gladstone Gallery from 2022 to 2025 and previously worked at Gagosian Gallery.

== Early life ==
Maroney was born on July 3, 1984, to James Maroney, an art dealer, and Suki Fredericks, in New York City. He has a younger sister named Annabelle. In 1986, the family moved to Leicester, Vermont, to have a quieter life. They began Oliver Hill Farm, a 750-acre dairy and animal farm in 1990. A 1994 fire killed all the animals and ruined much of the farm; as of 2015 the family has been renting the land to organic farmers who use it for hay, feed and pasture.

After graduating from Middlebury Union High School, Maroney earned a Bachelor of Arts in art history at New York University, graduating in 2007.

== Career ==
After graduating from college, Maroney began a job at the Gagosian Gallery in Manhattan, New York City. He then became the director-at-large of Gladstone 64, the Gladstone Gallery's Upper East Side location. He worked as director at large there until 2025, with his representative explaining he was "transition[ing] to working independent projects".

Maroney has had several notable clients, including Matthew Barney, Anish Kapoor, Richard Prince, and Carroll Dunham, who has some of his art on display in Maroney's gallery.

== Personal life ==
Maroney met actress Jennifer Lawrence in May 2018, through friend Laura Simpson. They began dating the next month, got engaged in February 2019, and married on October 19, 2019, at the Belcourt of Newport mansion in Newport, Rhode Island. They have two sons: one born in February 2022; and another born in March 2025. They divide their time between the West Village and Bel Air.
