= Bread and Roses (2023 film) =

2023 American documentary film about Afghanistan

- Directed by: Sahra Mani
- Produced by: Sahra Mani; Jennifer Lawrence; Justine Ciarrocchi
- Cinematography: Abdul Sami Murtaza
- Edited by: Hayedeh Safiyari
- Music by: Masoud Sekhavat Doust
- Production company: Excellent Cadaver
- Distributed by: Apple Original Films
- Release dates: May 21, 2023 (Cannes); November 22, 2024 (United States)
- Running time: 90 minutes
- Country: United States

Bread and Roses is a 2023 American documentary film about women in Afghanistan and the role of the Taliban. It was directed and produced by Sahra Mani. It was co-produced by Jennifer Lawrence and Justine Ciarrocchi for their company Excellent Cadaver after Lawrence saw news coverage of the 2021 Taliban offensive as U.S. troops withdrew. The documentary features footage from Sharifa, an ex-government employee forced indoors, Zahra, a woman organizing activists in her dentistry practice, and Taranom, who seeks refuge in Pakistan. It debuted at the 2023 Cannes Film Festival to critical acclaim and released in select theaters and on Apple TV+ on November 22, 2024.

== Synopsis ==
The documentary shows the effects of the 2021 Taliban offensive that ended two decades of the War in Afghanistan. As American occupation ended and the Taliban gained further control, women lost the rights to education past sixth grade, work, and walking unaccompanied in public.

It follows three women. Sharifa, formerly a government employee, is reduced to a tedious life indoors. Zahra, a dentist made to stop working, begins organizing activists in her former practice; she is arrested and tortured. Taranom is exiled for her activism and becomes a Pakistani refugee. The documentary shows safe houses for women fleeing to Pakistan. Women protest the closing of schools, chanting for "work, bread and education", and water cannons and tear gas are used against them. In one piece of footage, a Taliban fighter threatens to kill a woman who has been arrested for continuing to speak. Female elementary and middle school students are seen chanting anti-Taliban messages.

The documentary ends inconclusively, as the conflict had not ended.

== Production ==
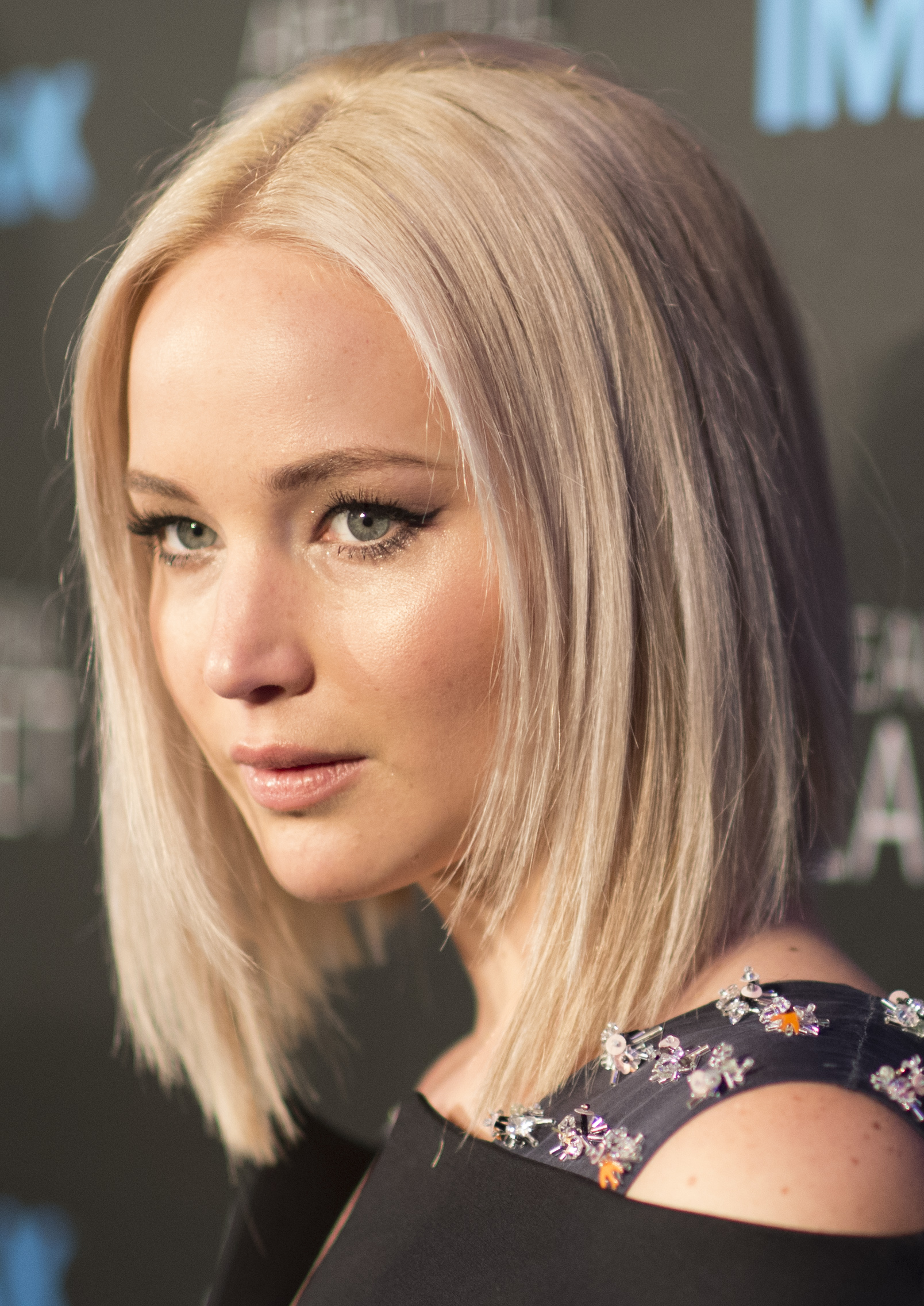
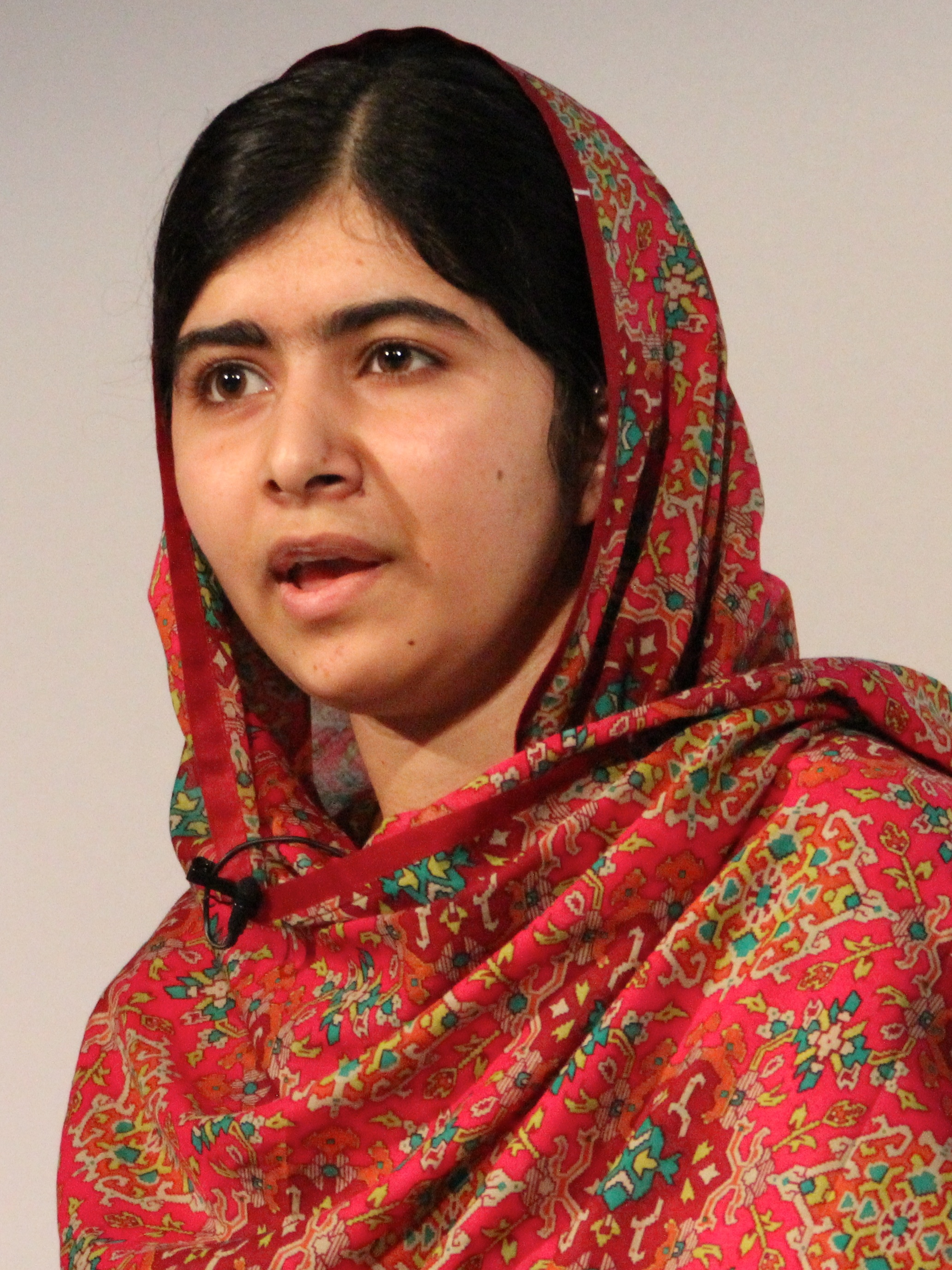
Jennifer Lawrence (left) approached director Sahra Mani to produce the film while Malala Yousafzai (right) joined as an executive producer later on.

The film was produced by Jennifer Lawrence and Justine Ciarrocchi under their company Excellent Cadaver, which they founded in 2018. Lawrence said that she felt "helpless and frustrated" upon seeing the news in Afghanistan and contemporaneous overturning of abortion rights in the U.S. She wanted the stories to get "into people's psyches" and "help people be galvanized", as American news was "constantly moving" and "distilled through our western lens". Lawrence said that U.S. democracy was "sliding back" despite being what separated the U.S. from countries like Afghanistan.

The director and producer Sahra Mani was hired after Lawrence and Ciarrocchi watched her documentary about an Afghan woman who was sexually abused, A Thousand Girls Like Me (2019). Mani, who worked under the Kabul production company Afghan Doc House, had to shelve a documentary Kabul Melody about a co-educational music school after it was destroyed by the Taliban.

Before Lawrence and Ciarrocchi contacted her, Mani had already begun gathering footage of women's lives under the Taliban. Most footage in the documentary came from three women who feature in it, with one additional cameraperson. The women captured footage on phones and cameras for a year. The production determined that it was unsafe for film crews or Mani to enter the country. Mani had left Kabul under a month before it fell to the Taliban, not knowing she would not return; the three main subjects had all left Afghanistan by 2023. While protesters in Afghanistan were kidnapped and killed, Mani said the film is sanitized, limited to showing protesters being attacked with water cannons.

After a month of collaboration, a 12-minute sizzle reel was composed to pitch to financiers. It was funded by Farhad Khosravi. Postproduction took place in Iran. The film was edited by Hayedeh Safiyari. It became the third production by Excellent Cadaver, which Ciarrocchi said "came out of necessity" rather than a mission to produce documentaries.

== Release ==
Bread and Roses premiered at the 2023 Cannes Film Festival on May 21, 2023. Mani announced at the screening that the "soft message" from women in Afghanistan was for viewers to "please be their voice". The activist Zahra Mohammadi, featured in the documentary, told the audience: "do not forget about Afghan women!" Apple Original Films acquired global rights to the film, with Malala Yousafzai's Extracurricular as executive producer. Yousafzai believed western citizens must "hold their leaders to account" on what their government was doing to protect women's rights in Afghanistan. It was originally scheduled to be released on Apple TV+ on June 21, 2024 before it was postponed. It was released in select theaters in Los Angeles, New York City, and other cities on November 22, 2024.

== Reception ==
Bread & Roses received critical acclaim upon release. On the review aggregator website Rotten Tomatoes, 100% of 17 critics' reviews are positive, with an average rating of 7.9/10. Metacritic, which uses a weighted average, assigned the film a score of 79 out of 100, based on 9 critics, indicating "generally favorable" reviews.

Variety's Catherine Bray praised it as a "necessary howl of rage", saying that it was "urgent and timely" and that its "scrappy, up-close and personal" style benefits from the lack of narrator or viewer stand-in role. Lovia Gyarkye of The Hollywood Reporter described the documentary as "an unparalleled look at Kabul" and "a blueprint for Afghanistan's next generation in their fight for self-determination". Gyarkye said it was "harrowing" as it "intimately documents life for women in Afghanistan" with a "clear-eyed honesty and a compassionate eye". Gyarkye contrasted it with In Her Hands, a documentary about the young politician Zarifa Ghafari with a "thriller-esque narrative", in comparison to which Bread and Roses has "a more honest register".
