= Causeway (film) =

2022 film by Lila Neugebauer

- Release poster
- Directed by: Lila Neugebauer
- Written by: Ottessa Moshfegh; Luke Goebel; Elizabeth Sanders
- Produced by: Jennifer Lawrence; Justine Ciarrocchi
- Starring: Jennifer Lawrence; Brian Tyree Henry; Linda Emond; Jayne Houdyshell; Stephen McKinley Henderson; Russell Harvard
- Cinematography: Diego García
- Edited by: Robert Frazen; Lucian Johnston
- Music by: Alex Somers
- Production companies: A24; Excellent Cadaver; IAC Films
- Distributed by: A24; Apple TV+
- Release dates: September 10, 2022 (TIFF); October 28, 2022 (United States)
- Running time: 92 minutes
- Country: United States
- Languages: English; American Sign Language

Causeway is a 2022 American drama film directed by Lila Neugebauer and written by Ottessa Moshfegh, Luke Goebel, and Elizabeth Sanders. The film stars Jennifer Lawrence (who also produced), Brian Tyree Henry, Linda Emond, Jayne Houdyshell, Stephen McKinley Henderson, and Russell Harvard. It follows a soldier struggling to adjust to her life after returning home to New Orleans.

Causeway had its premiere at the 47th Toronto International Film Festival on September 10, 2022. The film was released in select theaters on October 28, by A24, then had a streaming release on November 4, 2022, on Apple TV+. The film received generally positive reviews from critics, who praised the performances of Lawrence and Henry. Among other accolades, Henry was nominated for Best Supporting Actor at the 95th Academy Awards.

== Plot ==
Lynsey, a soldier in the United States Army Corps of Engineers during the Afghanistan War, is recovering from a traumatic brain injury. She undergoes physical therapy with a kindly professional caretaker, Sharon, and gradually regains her motor skills. Unable to afford further treatment, she is forced to return home to New Orleans.

Staying in her childhood home with her unreliable mother Gloria, Lynsey finds a job cleaning pools. When the truck once belonging to her brother breaks down, she finds help from James, an auto mechanic. Struggling to adjust to daily life and her new medications, she explains to her doctor that she was injured by an IED in Afghanistan, but is determined to return to duty.

Lynsey and James become unlikely friends, and after he helps her avoid unwanted advances at a bar, she reveals that she is a lesbian. He confides in her about losing his leg in a car crash on the Lake Pontchartrain Causeway, and she opens up about her unhappy memories of home, including her brother Justin's problems with drugs. James drunkenly invites her to move in with him, in the house he used to share with his sister and her son.

Despite her mother's objections, Lynsey commits herself to qualifying for redeployment, and finds herself swimming in an out-of-town client's pool. She continues to spend time with James, bonding over sno-balls and their shared physical and mental trauma. Her doctor fears the impact of her injury on her mental health, warning of the strong link between trauma and her depression.

When Lynsey convinces James to join her in the pool, he reveals that he was driving when the car crashed; his nephew was killed, leaving him estranged from his sister. Comforting James, Lynsey impulsively kisses him. Embarrassed, she declares that she was acting out of pity, leading to an argument about the things they have kept from each other, and James ends their friendship.

Lynsey's doctor reluctantly agrees to sign her redeployment waiver. She is unable to reach James, but discovers he had the truck repaired for free, and is inspired to reconnect with Justin, visiting him in prison. Changing her mind about leaving, she is able to bring herself to clean her mother's own disused pool, and to swim at a public pool. She visits James and urges him to ask her to move in again, hoping to make amends with her friend.

== Cast ==
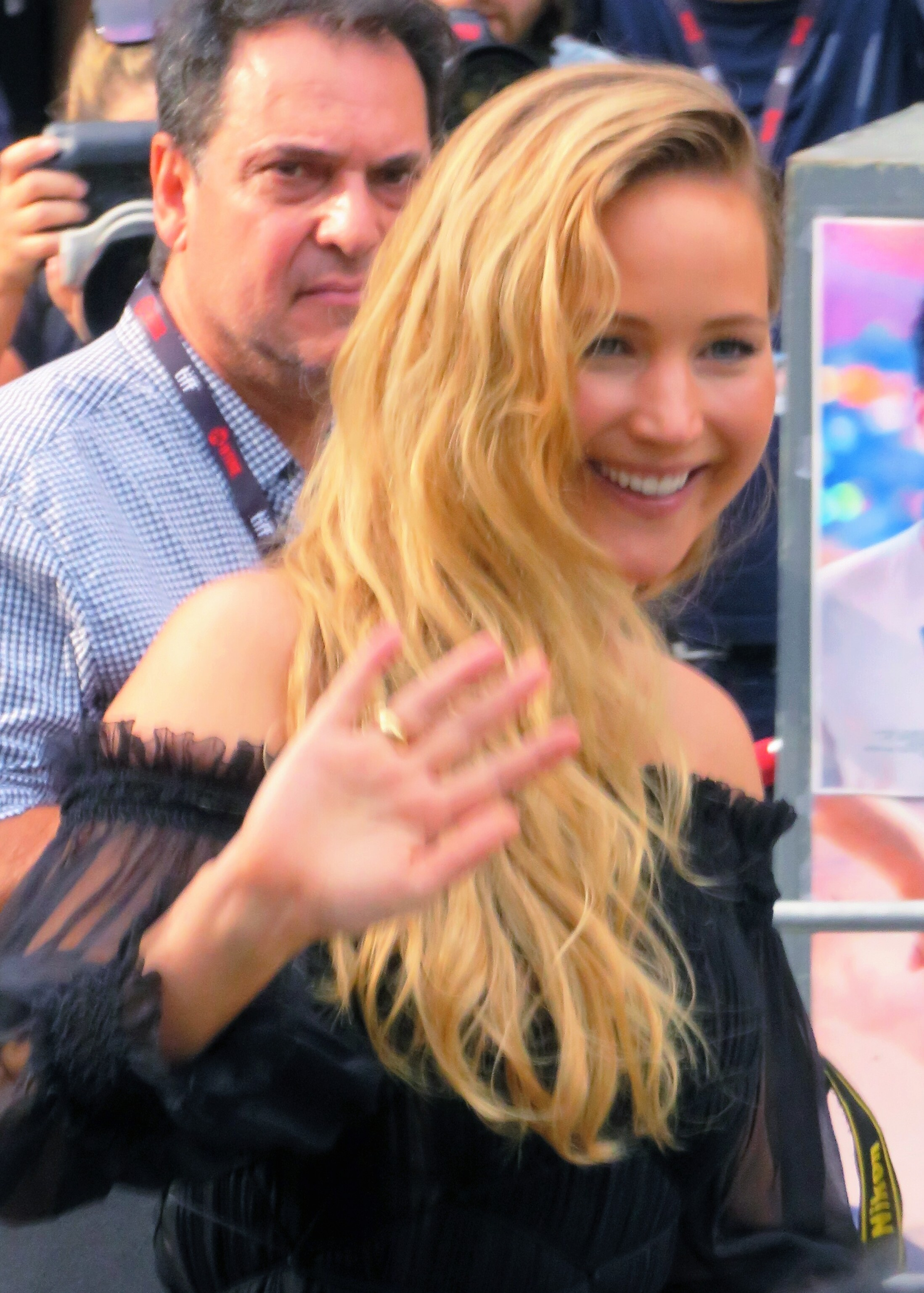
Lawrence at the film's premiere in Toronto

- Jennifer Lawrence as Lynsey
- Brian Tyree Henry as James Aucoin
- Linda Emond as Gloria, Lynsey's mother
- Jayne Houdyshell as Sharon, a caretaker
- Stephen McKinley Henderson as Dr. Lucas
- Russell Harvard as Justin, Lynsey's brother
- Sean Carvajal as Santiago, a mechanic
- Fred Weller as Rick, the pool cleaner boss
- Neal Huff as Neuropsychologist

== Production ==
In April 2019, it was announced Jennifer Lawrence and Brian Tyree Henry had joined the cast of an untitled drama film, with Lila Neugebauer directing from a screenplay by Elizabeth Sanders. Lawrence, Justine Polsky, Eli Bush and Scott Rudin initially served as producers under their Excellent Cadaver and IAC Films banners, respectively, and A24 distributed it.

Production began in the summer of 2019 in New Orleans, but was delayed due to Hurricane Barry. Production restarted in March 2020, but was once again delayed due to the COVID-19 pandemic and was completed in the summer of 2021. Lawrence and Henry continued to workshop the script together during the pandemic as a result of their chemistry and to further enrich it as their scenes were seen as the most compelling of the film.

In April 2021, following allegations of abuse, Scott Rudin stepped back as a producer from the project. On December 30, 2021, the Writers Guild of America awarded final screenplay credit for the film to both Sanders and the team of Ottessa Moshfegh and Luke Goebel.

== Release and reception ==
In July 2022, it was announced Apple TV+ would distribute the film. The film had its world premiere at the 2022 Toronto International Film Festival on September 10, 2022. The European premiere was held on October 8, 2022, at the BFI London Film Festival. It had a limited theatrical release on October 28, 2022, and was released on Apple TV+ on November 4, 2022.

=== Critical response ===
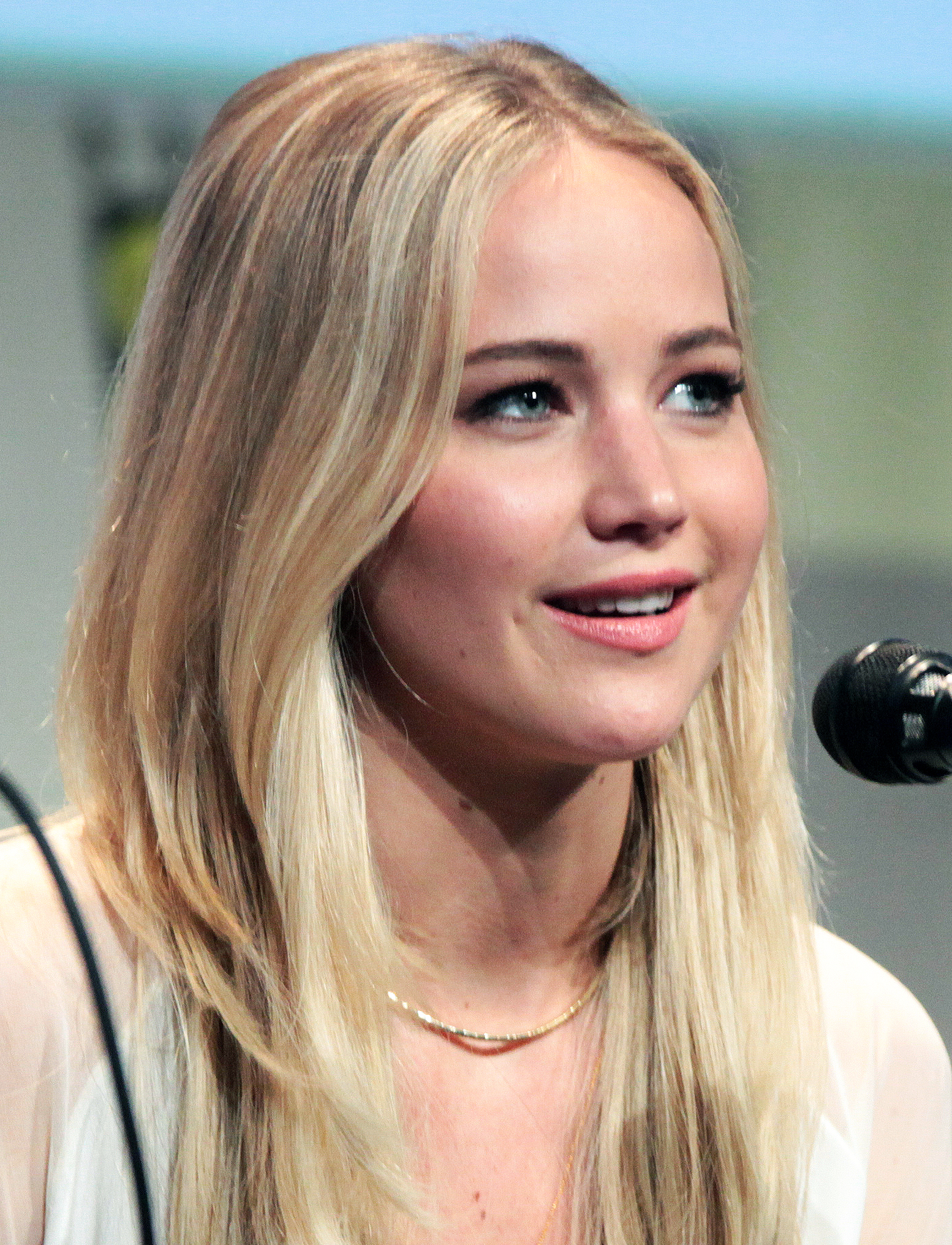
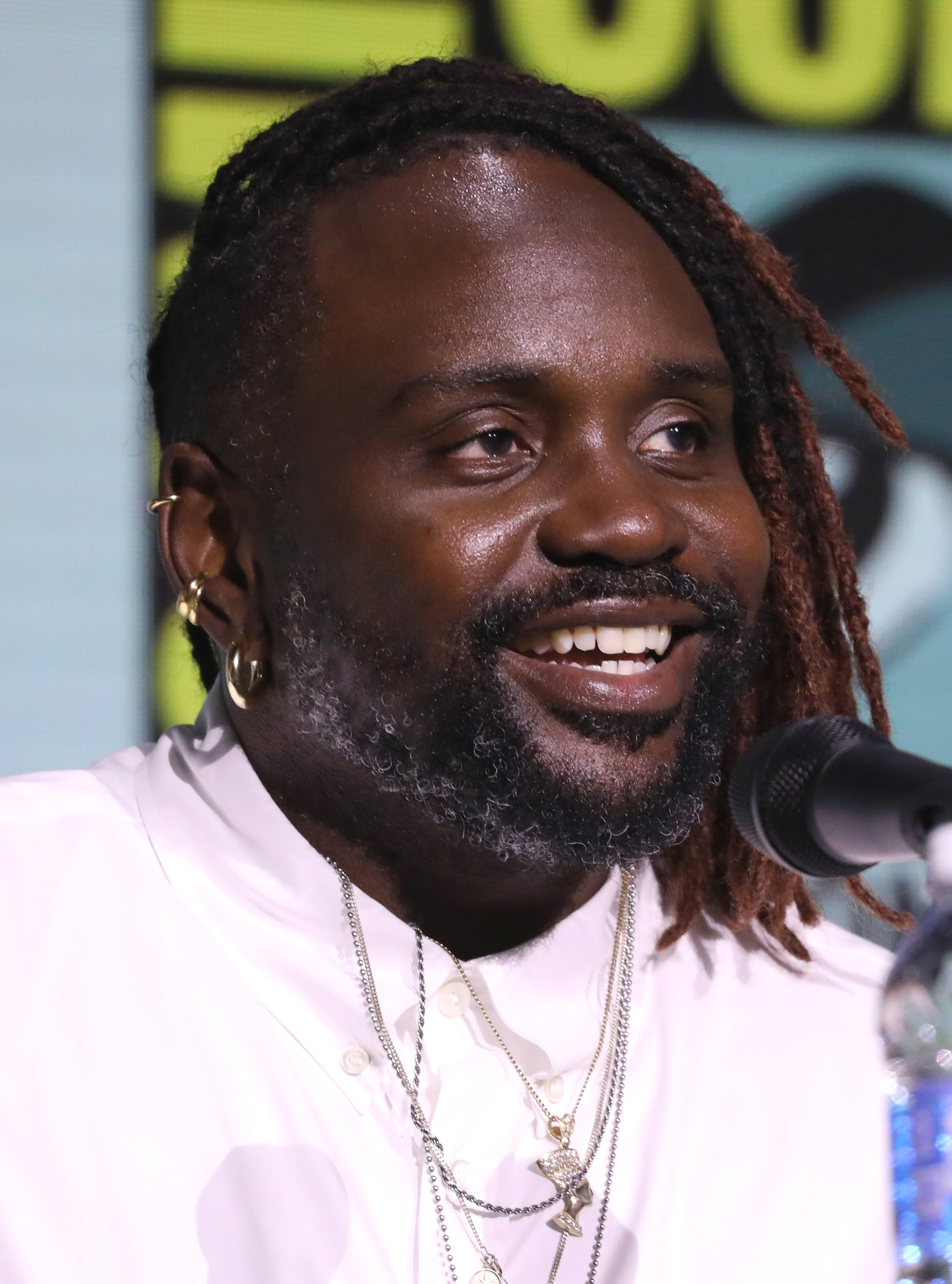
Jennifer Lawrence and Brian Tyree Henry garnered critical acclaim for their performances, earning the latter an Academy Award nomination for Best Supporting Actor.

On the review aggregator website Rotten Tomatoes, 85% of 168 critics' reviews are positive, with an average rating of 7.1/10. The website's consensus reads: "Causeway takes a powerfully subdued look at the lingering effects of trauma, led by gripping performances from Jennifer Lawrence and Brian Tyree Henry." Metacritic, which uses a weighted average, assigned the film a score of 66 out of 100, based on 39 critics, indicating "generally favorable" reviews.

Wendy Ide of The Observer awarded 4 stars out of 5, praised the film and wrote " this is a subdued, sensitive drama and Lawrence is phenomenal, giving the kind of wary, reined-in performance that made such a compelling impression in her breakthrough film, Winter’s Bone." In a B+ review for Consequence, Mary Siroky wrote: "while one of the few downsides of Causeway is the lingering desire to spend more time with these characters, the film holds an excellent return to form for Jennifer Lawrence and makes a stellar case for many more leading man roles for Brian Tyree Henry," further praising Lawrence's performance as "gripping" in comparison to her work in Winter's Bone and that Henry "is so grounded here that there are moments we feel like we are intruding into his life." Anna Smith for Time Out gave it 4 out of 5 stars review and wrote: "both actors are terrific: Lawrence is understated and compelling while Henry is by turns sympathetic, amusing and heartbreaking...Causeway will offer plenty for fans of thoughtful, quality dramas that touch on humanity, trauma, connection and the kindness of strangers."

In a review for The Austin Chronicle, Jenny Nulf wrote: "Watching Jennifer Lawrence in a film that allows her to showcase her skills at full force after so many years without her is a welcome reminder that she’s one of our greatest living actresses [...] Lawrence and Henry do an incredible job at dancing around each other, soft smiles to communicate their pain and hardships without relying on overwritten exposition. Director Lila Neugebauer (best known in the theatre space, but who also worked on the critically acclaimed series Maid) manages to keep the tone understated, focusing on the nuances of Lawrence and Henry’s performances that carry the weight of the heavy script." Adam White, giving the film 4 out of 5 stars in a review for The Independent, praised Lawrence's performance as "brilliant" (stating it as a reminder of previous acclaimed naturalistic work) and that "Henry lends each hushed gap in James’s tale the feel of a sledgehammer."

=== Accolades ===
Accolades received by Causeway
Award	Date of ceremony	Category	Recipient(s)	Result	Ref.
Academy Awards	March 12, 2023	Best Supporting Actor	Brian Tyree Henry	Nominated	
Alliance of Women Film Journalists	January 5, 2023	Best Supporting Actor	Brian Tyree Henry	Nominated	
Austin Film Critics Association	January 10, 2023	Best Supporting Actor	Brian Tyree Henry	Nominated	
Black Reel Awards	February 6, 2023	Outstanding Supporting Actor	Brian Tyree Henry	Won	
Chicago Film Critics Association	December 14, 2022	Best Supporting Actor	Brian Tyree Henry	Nominated	
Critics' Choice Movie Awards	January 15, 2023	Best Supporting Actor	Brian Tyree Henry	Nominated	
Dallas–Fort Worth Film Critics Association	December 19, 2022	Best Supporting Actor	Brian Tyree Henry	4th Place	
Georgia Film Critics Association	January 13, 2023	Best Supporting Actor	Brian Tyree Henry	Nominated	
Gotham Independent Film Awards	November 28, 2022	Outstanding Supporting Performance	Brian Tyree Henry	Nominated	
Florida Film Critics Circle	December 22, 2022	Best First Film	Lila Neugebauer	Nominated	
Hollywood Critics Association	February 24, 2023	Best First Feature	Lila Neugebauer	Nominated	
Hollywood Critics Association	February 24, 2023	Best Supporting Actor	Brian Tyree Henry	Nominated	
Independent Spirit Awards	March 4, 2023	Best Supporting Performance	Brian Tyree Henry	Nominated	
Las Vegas Film Critics Society	December 12, 2022	Best Actress	Jennifer Lawrence	Nominated	
Las Vegas Film Critics Society	December 12, 2022	Best Supporting Actor	Brian Tyree Henry	Nominated	
London Film Critics' Circle	February 5, 2023	Supporting Actor of the Year	Brian Tyree Henry	Nominated	
Los Angeles Film Critics Association	December 11, 2022	Best Supporting Performance	Brian Tyree Henry	Runner-up	
National Society of Film Critics	January 7, 2023	Best Supporting Actor	Brian Tyree Henry	Runner-up	
Online Film Critics Society	January 23, 2023	Best Supporting Actor	Brian Tyree Henry	Nominated	
San Diego Film Critics Society	January 6, 2023	Best Supporting Actor	Brian Tyree Henry	Runner-up	
Seattle Film Critics Society	January 17, 2023	Best Actor in a Supporting Role	Brian Tyree Henry	Nominated	
Rome Film Festival	October 22, 2022	Best First Feature Award	Lila Neugebauer	Won	
