= Vivian Panka =

Dutch actress (Born June 1, 1996)

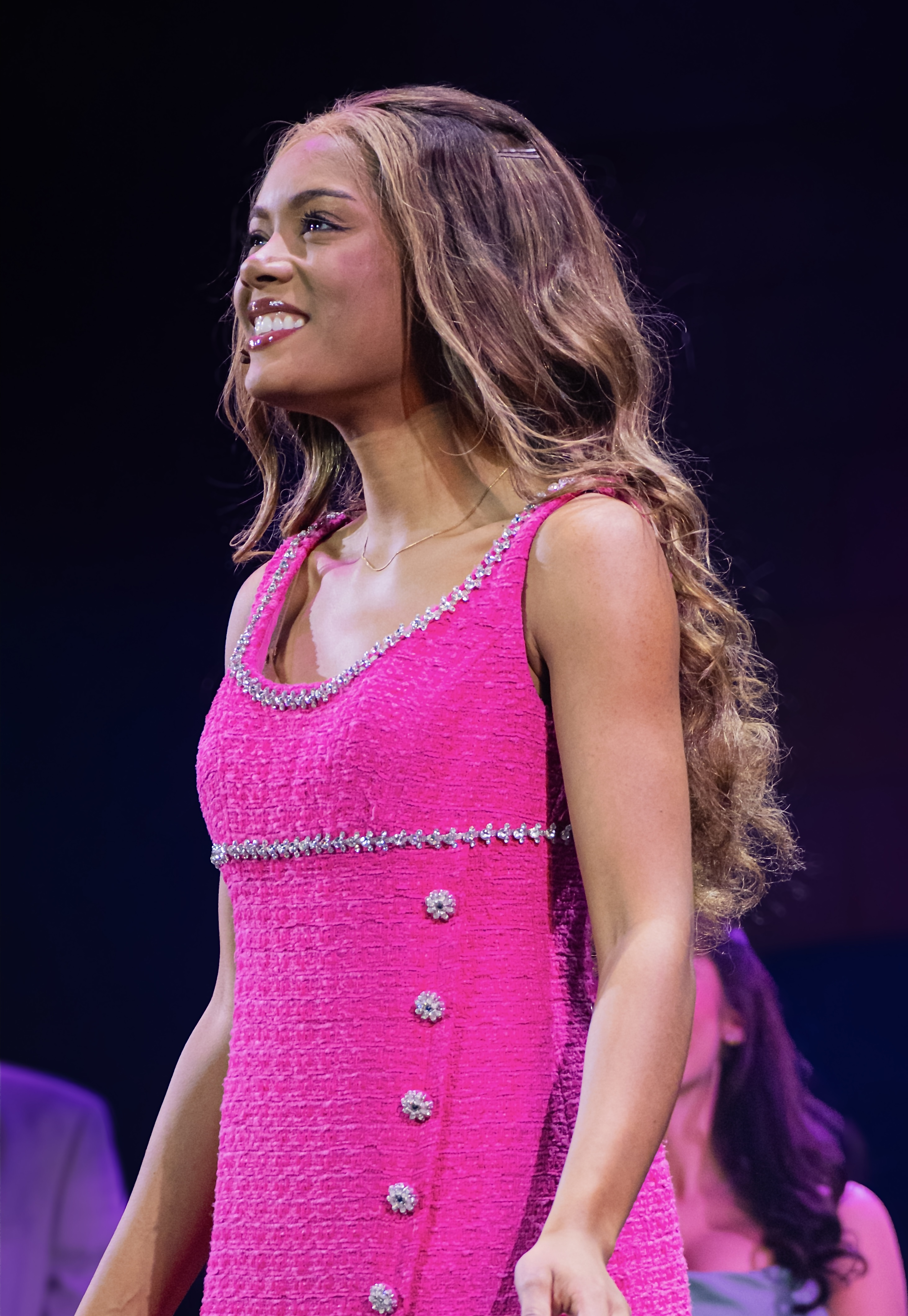
- Panka as Regina George in the UK and Ireland tour of Mean Girls in 2026
- Citizenship: Netherlands
- Education: Codarts and Identity School of Acting
- Occupations: Actress, singer
- Years active: 2016-present

Vivian Panka is a Dutch musical theatre actress. She is known for playing the role of Heather Duke in the Heathers: The Musical movie, as well as for the role of Regina George in a touring production of Mean Girls.

== Early life ==
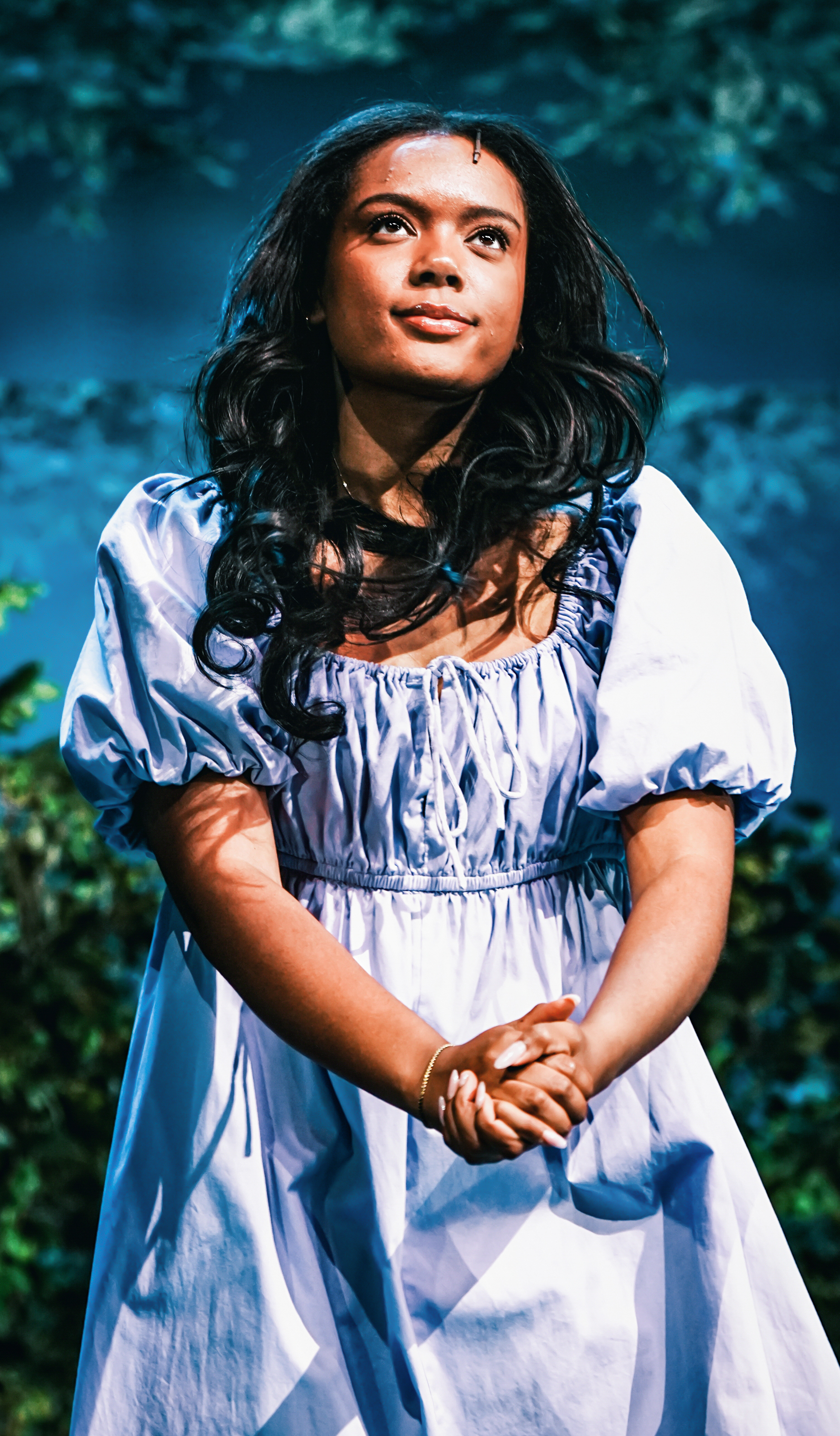
Panka in June 2025

Panka earned a Bachelors of Arts in Musical Theatre at Codarts, a Rotterdam based vocational arts school, where she studied from 2013 to 2017.

Panka started performing in Dutch theatre, taking on the role of Feline in Vals and the role of Bo in Shock, two musicals based on bestselling novels by Dutch author Mel Wallis de Vries, which opened in 2016 and 2017 respectively. In 2018, Panka was nominated for the Up-and-coming talent category at the Dutch Musical Awards.

In 2020, Panka moved to the United Kingdom and studied at the Identity School of Acting in London.

== Career ==
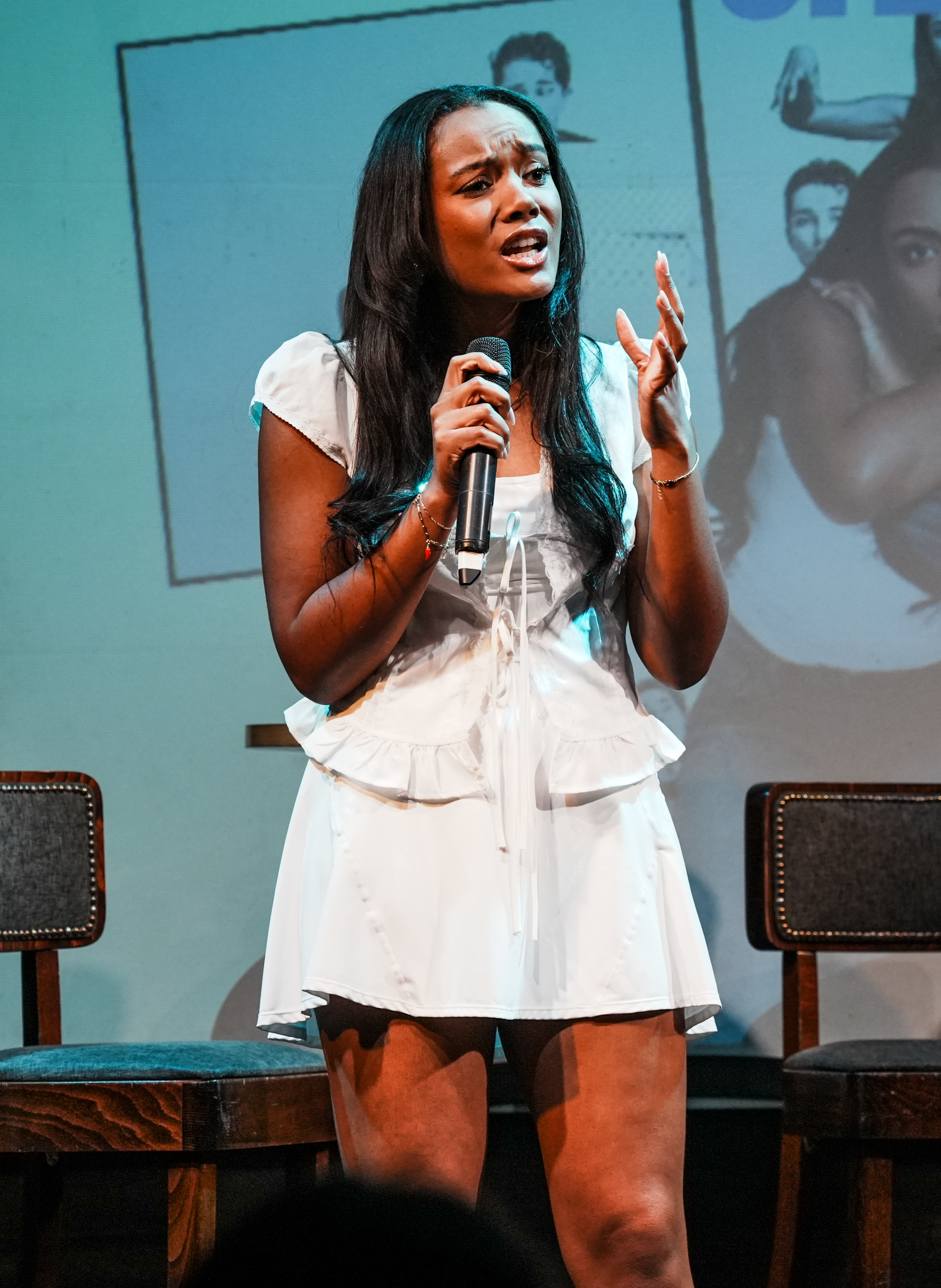
Panka in November 2025.

In 2021, Panka was cast as Judy Bernly in the third touring production of the 9 to 5 musical, marking her United Kingdom and English language stage debut.

The follow year, Panka took on the role of Heather Duke in a revival of Heathers: The Musical at the Off-West End theatre The Other Palace. She was cast in the same role in the pro-shoot stage capture of the show produced by BK Studios and Roku. Her singing performance in the movie received praise.

Panka joined the UK touring production of Dear Evan Hansen in the role of Alana Beck, which opened for previews on the 9 September 2024 at the Nottingham Playhouse. The tour extended its UK run until July 2025. In October the same year, Panka played the role of Brody in the original comedy musical The Shocking Truth About Flat Earth.

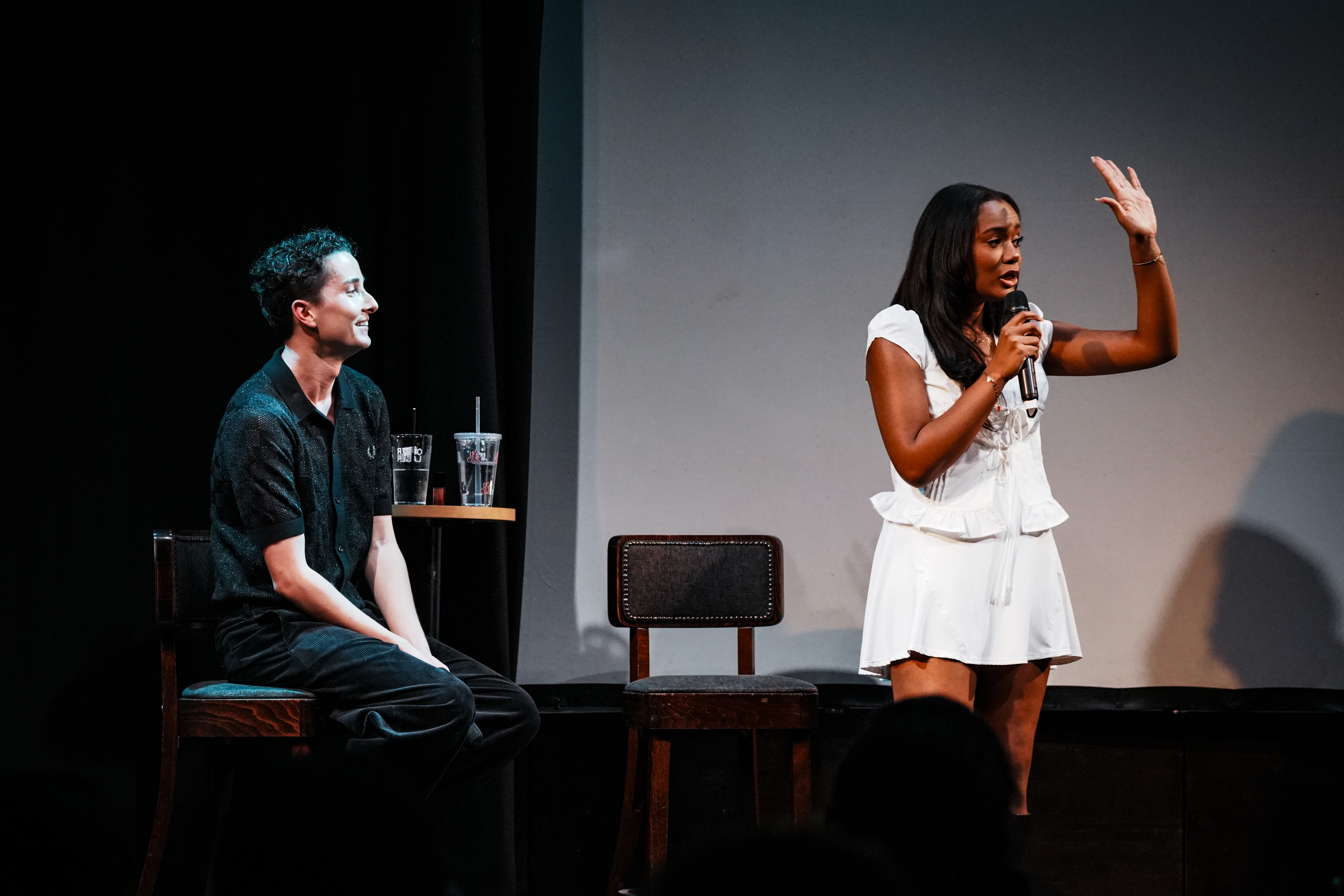
Panka (right) and Kopel (left) in November 2025.

In November 2025, Panka performed in the Breaking Character concert at the Other Palace studio theatre alongside Dear Evan Hansen co-star Ryan Kopel.

Panka was cast in the first UK and Ireland tour of the Mean Girls musical as Regina George, which opened on the 23rd February 2026 at the Manchester Opera House. Panka has received praise for her interpretation of the role, and has received coverage for being the first black person to play the role of Regina George full time.

== Filmography ==
Film roles
Year	Title	Role	Notes
2022	Heathers: The Musical	Heather Duke	Pro-shoot

== Theatre ==
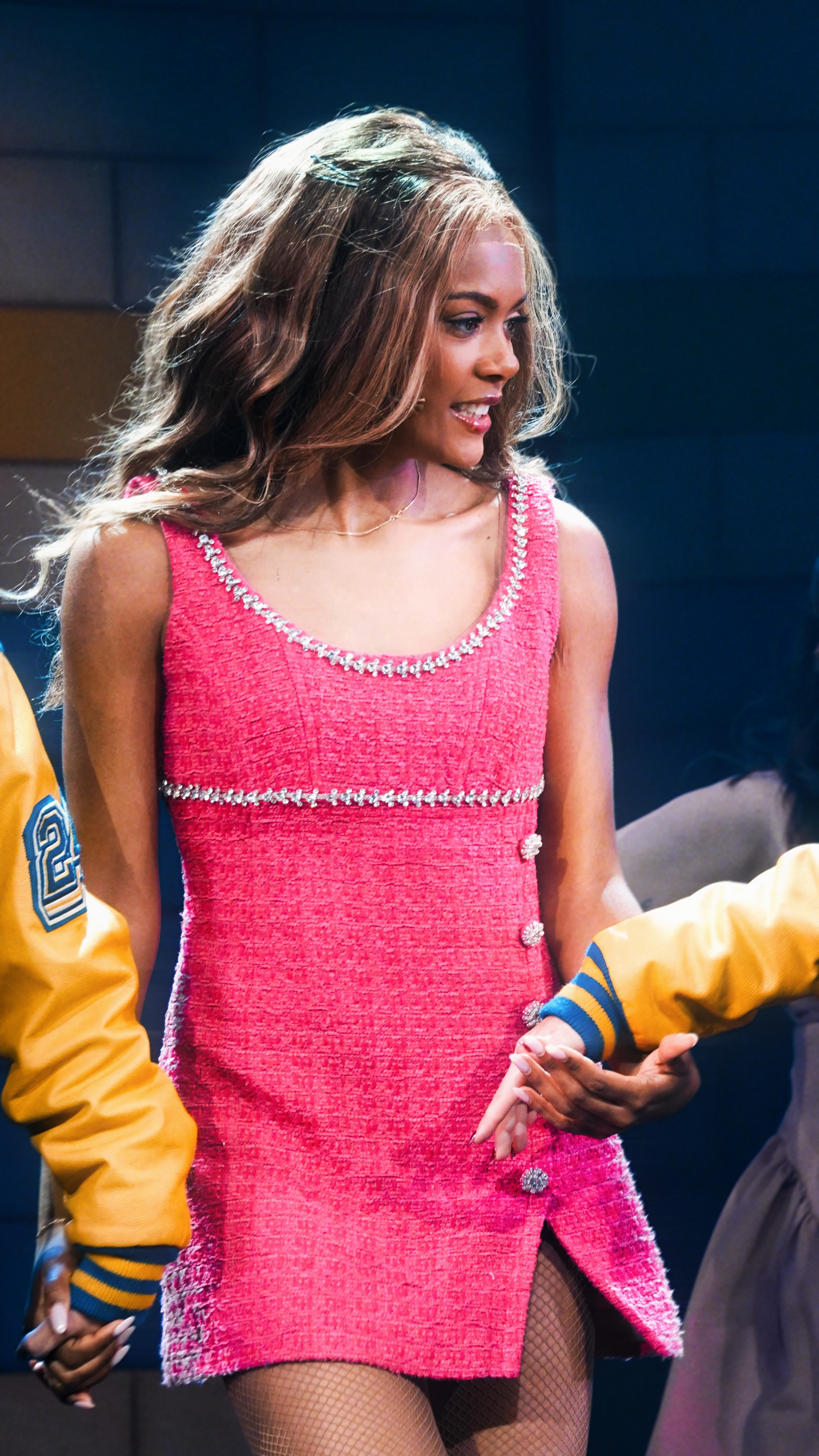
Panka in April 2025.

Stage roles
Year	Title	Role	Notes
2016	Vals	Feline	Dutch touring production. Premiered at Flint, Amersfoort, Netherlands
2017	Shock	Bo	Dutch touring production. Premiered at Theater De Kom, Nieuwegein, Netherlands.
2021	9 to 5 (musical)	Judy Bernly	Third UK Tour
2022	Heathers: The Musical	Heather Duke	Revival at The Other Palace
2024	Dear Evan Hansen	Alana Beck	UK touring production
2025	The Shocking Truth About Flat Earth	Brody	Cockpit Theatre, London
2026	Mean Girls (musical)	Regina George	UK and Ireland touring production

Concert roles
Year	Title	Role	Notes
2025	What's Next?	Herself	Show also features performances with Alice Fearn, Will Forgrave, Olivia Faith Kamau, Jessica Lim, Lara Sas and Lois Morgan Gay. The venue is The Crazy Coqs, London, United Kingdom
2025	Breaking Character	Herself	Collaborative musical show with Ryan Kopel. Venue is The Other Palace, London.
