= Ryan Kopel =

Scottish actor and singer (born 1997)

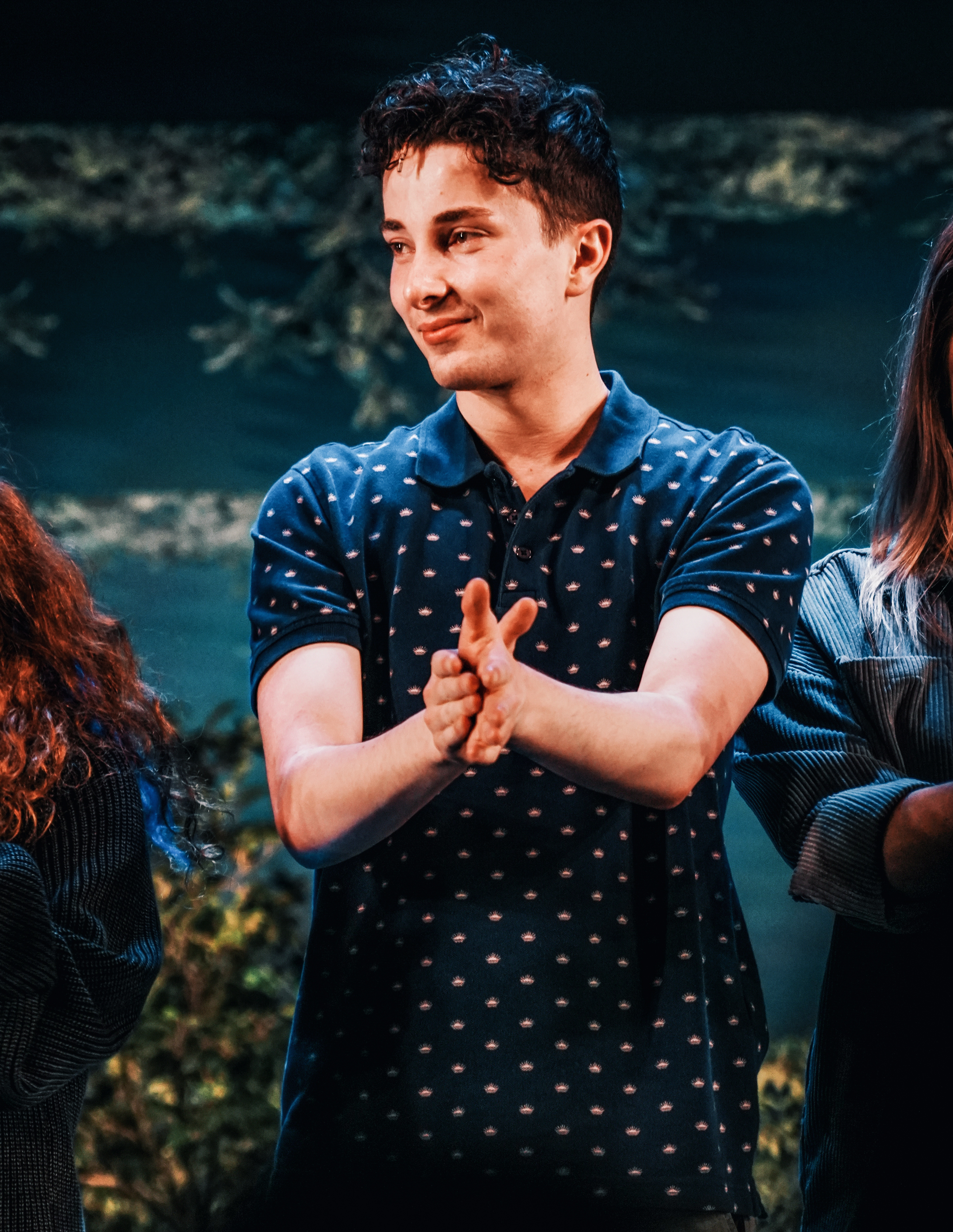
- Kopel at the curtain call of Dear Evan Hansen in November 2024
- Born: Ryan Kopel; 17 July 1997 (age 29); Kirriemuir, Angus, Scotland
- Education: Mountview Academy of Theatre Arts
- Occupations: Actor, singer
- Years active: 2018–present
- Parent: Scott Kopel (father)
- Relatives: Frank Kopel (grandfather)

Ryan Kopel (born 17 July 1997) is a Scottish actor and singer. He is known for his roles in various West End and off-West End plays and musicals, as well as the titular role in Dear Evan Hansen.

== Early life ==
Kopel was born in 1997 to Scott and Jacqueline Kopel in Kirriemuir, Scotland. He is the grandson of footballer Frank Kopel. Kopel grew up enjoying theatre, performing with his local youth theatre group at the Kirriemuir Town Hall. At the age of 13, he decided to train to pursue a career in stage and screen acting, attending the vocational Dance School of Scotland, in Glasgow. Kopel then moved to London to study at the Mountview Academy of Theatre Arts, where he graduated in 2018 with a BA in Musical Theatre.

In 2018, Kopel won the 'Young Scottish Musical Theatre Performer of the Year' award.

== Career ==
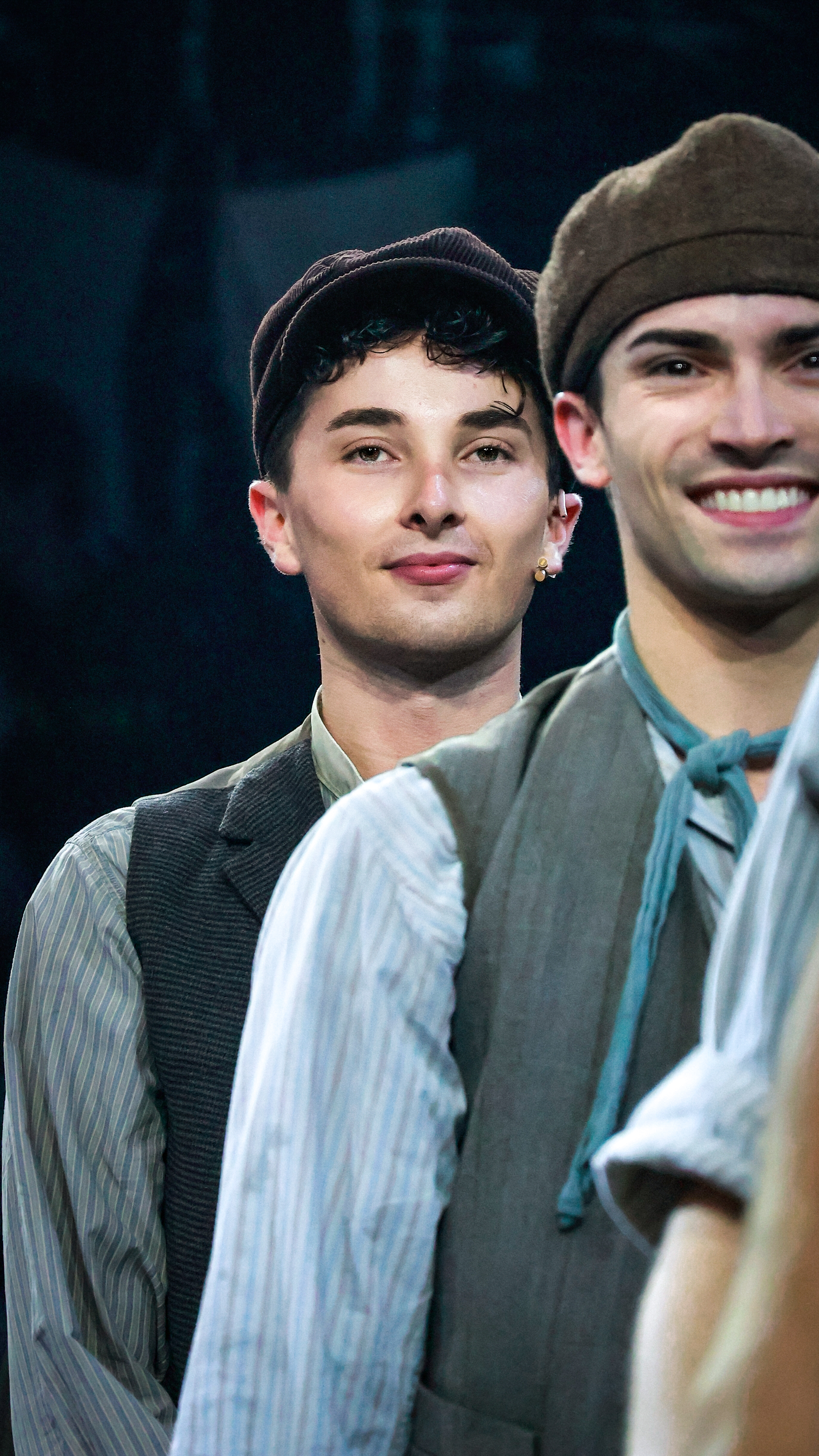
Kopel (left) at the curtain call of Newsies in July 2023.

Kopel started his career on stage in 2018, performing at the King's Head Theatre as Jerry Johnson in And Tell Sad Stories of the Deaths of Queens..., a play by American playwright Tennessee Williams that discusses LGBT+ themes. In 2019, Kopel starred as the titular character in a production of The Astonishing Times of Timothy Cratchit alongside Paul Greenwood. In the same year, he performed at the Edinburgh International Festival in the concert version of West Side Story.

Kopel made his West End debut in 2018 in the Noel Coward Theatre, where he performed in The Inheritance, a seven-hour long play about the AIDS crisis directed by Stephen Daldry. Kopel continued on the West End, joining the ensemble cast of The Book of Mormon in 2020. In the same year, Kopel performed in the radio-play BLUFF, written and produced by Matt Cavendish and Ed Zanders.

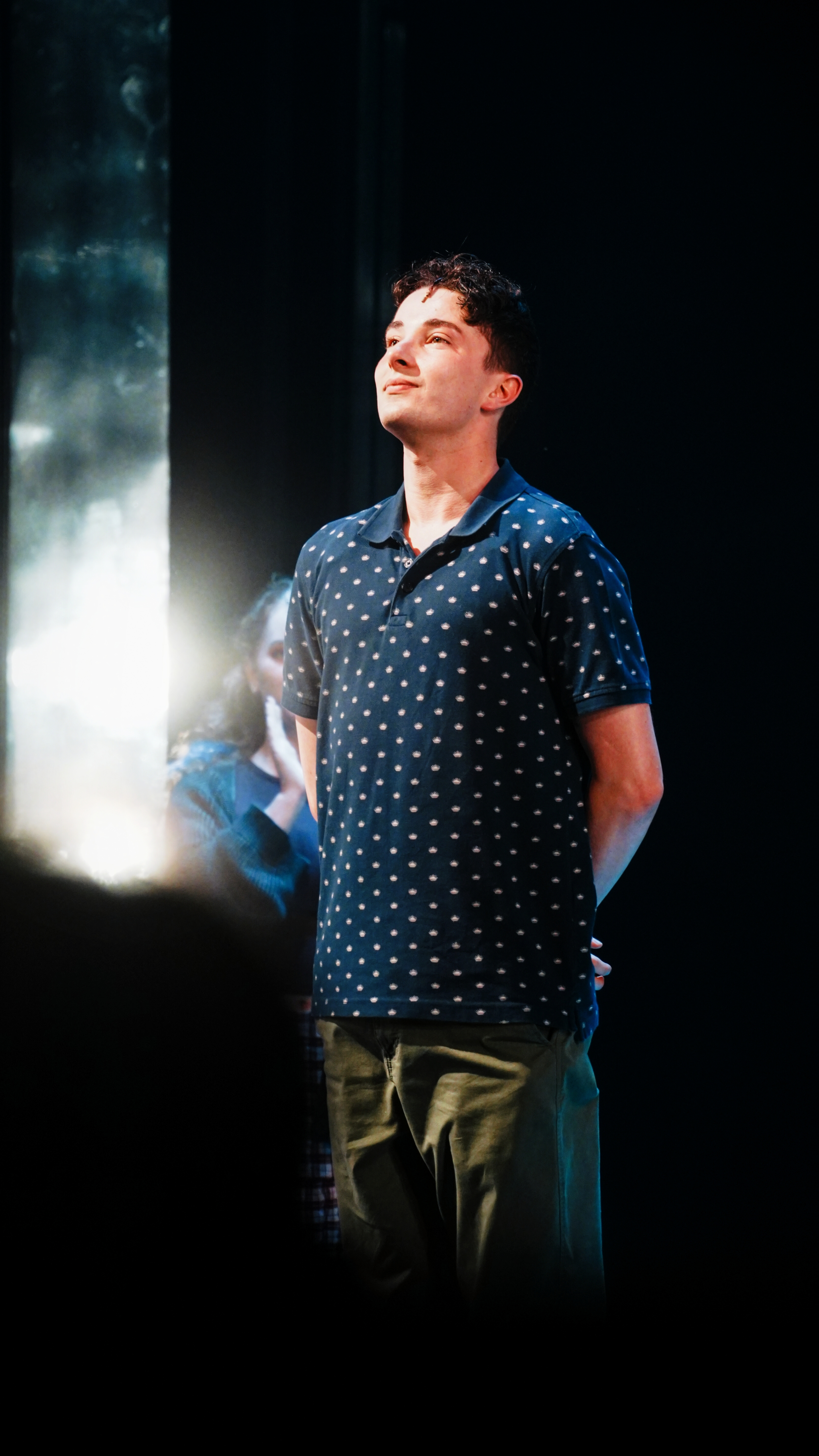
Kopel at the curtain call of Dear Evan Hansen in November 2024.

Kopel made his television debut in 2021 on the British medical drama Casualty, where he guest starred at Frank Polt. He then appeared in the 2022 British mini-series Wedding Season. Kopel returned to theatre in 2022 in Disney's musical Newsies, where he took on the role of Davey.

In 2024, Kopel performed as Lucas in the West End musical comedy The Addams Family. Kopel then appeared in HBO's House of the Dragon as Ser Aeron Bracken.

Kopel was announced to play the lead role of Evan Hansen in the UK touring production of Dear Evan Hansen, which opened for previews on 9 September 2024 at the Nottingham Playhouse. The production officially premiered on 17 September to reviews praising Kopel's performance, including from The Times and The Guardian. The tour extended its run in the UK until July 2025.

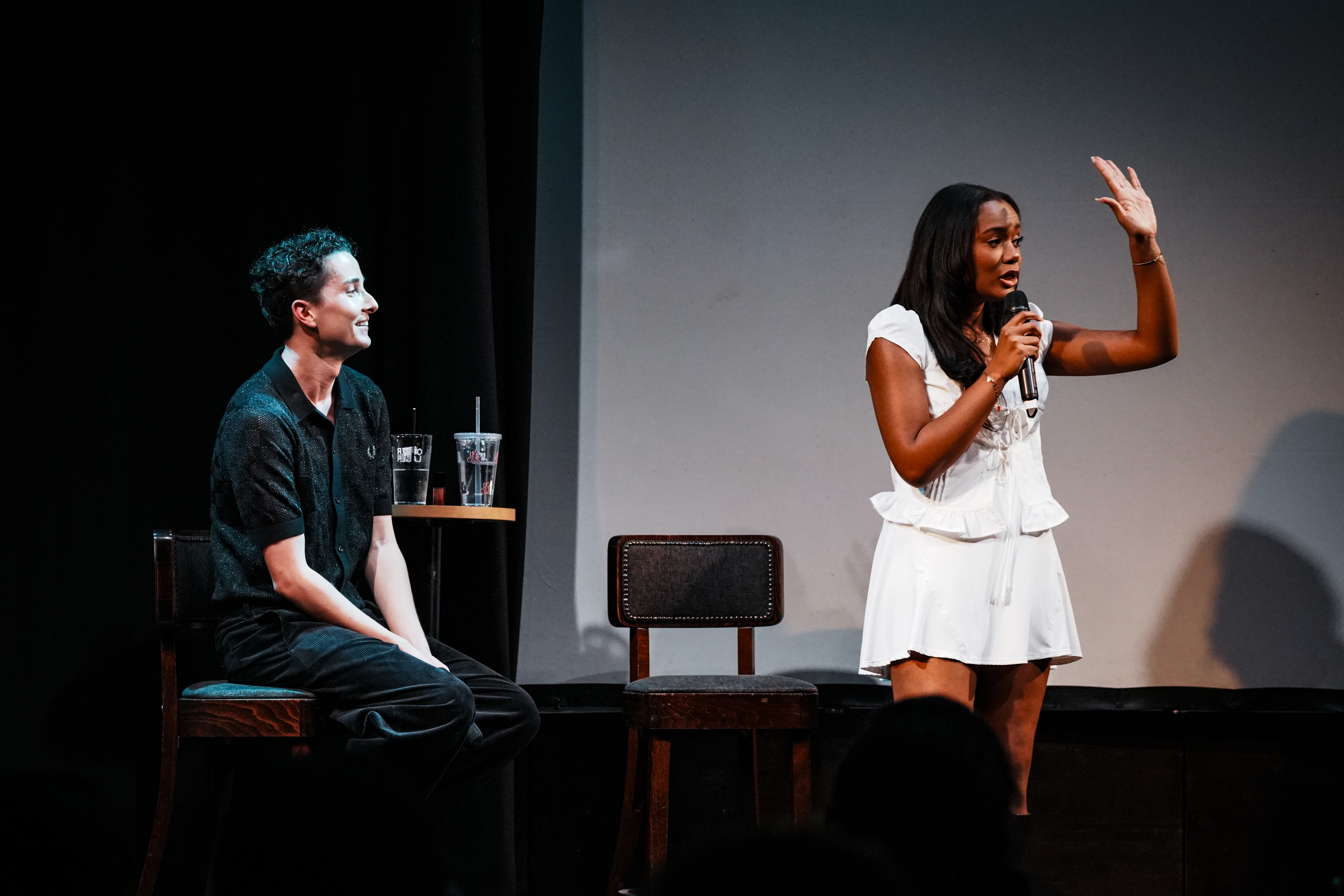
Kopel (left) and Panka (right) in November 2025.

In September 2025, Kopel appeared alongside Dear Evan Hansen co-star Alice Fearn as a special guest in the live concert celebrating the Golden Days musical theatre EP release. In November 2025, he then performed at the Breaking Character concert at the London The Other Palace studio theatre alongside Vivian Panka, who also performed in Dear Evan Hansen.

In 2026, Kopel was cast in the role of Charlie in the concert performance of the In Pieces musical, which ran from the 30th and 31st of March at The Other Palace Theatre. Kopel was then cast in the role of Joshua in the UK premiere of We Had a World, a play by Joshua Harmon. The play opened on the 29th of May at the Hampstead Theatre and ran until the 4th of July 2026. Kopel featured as a lead vocalist in the role of Elliot in the concept album World Enough, And Time. The album was written and produced by Ben Ward and was released on the 28th of August 2026. In October, Kopel performed the song 'Father' from the Confessional musical by James Lark, at the awards show where the song won the 2026 Stiles + Drewe Best New Song Prize. Kopel was then cast in the role of Mark in the Bridge Theatre run of the Pride, a musical based on the film of the same name, which itself was based on a true historical event.

== Filmography ==
Television roles
Year	Title	Role	Notes
2021	Casualty	Frank Polt	Series 35, episode 25. Credited as Ryan Koppel
2022	Wedding Season	Duncan	Episode #1.1
2024	House of the Dragon	Aeron Bracken	Episode: "The Burning Mill"

== Theatre ==
Stage roles
Year	Title	Role	Notes
2018	The Inheritance	Ensemble / Understudy Leo and Adam	Noel Coward Theatre, London
2018	And Tell Sad Stories of the Deaths of Queens...	Jerry Johnson	King's Head Theatre, London
2019	The Astonishing Times of Timothy Cratchit	Timothy Cratchit	Hope Mill Theatre, Manchester
2020	The Book of Mormon	Ensemble	Prince of Wales Theatre, London
2022	Newsies	Davey	Troubadour Wembley Park Theatre
2023	Scandalgate	Ensemble	Workshop at The Other Palace
2024	Dear Evan Hansen	Evan Hansen	UK touring production
2026	Pride	Mark Ashton	Bridge Theatre, London

Concert roles
Year	Title	Role	Notes
2019	West Side Story	Action	Edinburgh International Festival
2020	BLUFF	Alec Bonum	Radio musical
2023	Billie the Kid	David Frances	Vaudeville Theatre
2024	The Addams Family	Lucas	London Palladium
2025	Golden Days Musical Theatre EP Live Concert	Guest star	The Pheasantry
2025	Breaking Character	Himself	Collaborative musical show with Vivian Panka. Venue is The Other Palace, London.
2026	In Pieces	Charlie	The Other Palace, London
2026	We Had A World	Joshua	Hampstead Theatre, London
