= Scott Kopel =

Scottish former footballer (born 1970)

Personal information
- Full name: Scott Andrew Kopel
- Date of birth: 25 February 1970 (age 56)
- Place of birth: Blackburn, England
- Position: Midfielder

Youth career
- Dundee United

Senior career*
Years	Team	Apps	(Gls)
1987–1993	Dundee United	0	(0)
1993	Chesterfield	1	(0)
1993	Brechin City	4	(0)
1993–1995	Forfar Athletic	37	(7)
- * Club domestic league appearances and goals

Scott Andrew Kopel (born 25 February 1970 in Blackburn) is a Scottish former footballer who played as a defender.

Kopel, son of former Manchester United, Blackburn Rovers and Dundee United player Frank, began his career with Dundee United but made just one appearance, playing as a right-back in the 2–2 draw at home to Icelandic side FH in the 1990-91 UEFA Cup first round. Kopel failed to appear in another matchday squad and played a game for Chesterfield on a non-contract basis before joining Brechin City in 1993. Playing just four league matches for Brechin, Kopel moved on to Forfar Athletic and became more of a regular, playing nearly forty league games in two seasons, scoring seven goals. Following his departure in 1995, Kopel moved to junior side Dundee St Joseph's and later played in the 2001 Scottish Junior Cup Final for Carnoustie Panmure.

Kopel was appointed assistant manager at Montrose in January 2006 but left the club by the end of the season.

== Personal life ==
Scott is married and has two children, one of whom is the West End actor Ryan Kopel.
