= Jessica Phillips (actress) =

American actress (born 1971)

- Born: Jessica Leigh Phillips; November 3, 1971 (age 54); Nashville, Tennessee
- Education: Emerson College (BFA, 1994)
- Occupation: Actress
- Spouse(s): Nicholas Rohlfing (div. 2011) Tad Wilson (m. 2017; div. 2021) Chelsea Nachman (m. 2024)
- Children: 2

Jessica Phillips (born November 3, 1971) is an American actress, best known for her roles in multiple Broadway shows and the role of Pippa Cox in Law & Order: Special Victims Unit.

== Early life and education ==
Phillips is the eldest daughter of Dr. Gary Phillips, a religious historian and writer, and Alice Phillips. She was born in Nashville, Tennessee, but raised in Sutton, Massachusetts. Phillips was a competitive dancer before turning to acting, studying the Linklater Technique as a teen and later training under Kristin Linklater herself. Phillips attended the Worcester Academy in Worcester, Massachusetts, where she graduated in 1989. She then earned a BFA in musical theatre in 1994 from Emerson College, where she studied under director Leo Nickole.

== Career ==
Her first audition after college led to the role of Mrs. Walker in the Broadway touring company of The Who's Tommy.

In 1999, she returned to Nashville for five years, where she appeared in the Joseph and the Amazing Technicolor Dreamcoat musical and performed on radio as a demo singer.

Phillips has starred in multiple Broadway shows, including all three versions of The Scarlet Pimpernel (Marguerite), Next to Normal (Diana), Priscilla, Queen of the Desert (Marion), and most recently Leap of Faith (Marla).

Phillips performed at the grand re-opening of Radio City Music Hall, hosted by Billy Crystal and has shared the stage with Billy Porter, Estelle Parsons, Marc Kudisch, Leslie Odom Jr., and Alice Ripley. She also starred as Ellen in the world premiere of Unknown Soldier at the Williamstown Theater Festival in 2015. and as Michele Serling in Deathless by Zack Zadek at Goodspeed Musicals in 2017.

=== Television ===
She has guest starred in several television series including Unforgettable, Royal Pains, and Elementary. Between 2013 and 2016, Phillips played attorney Pippa Cox in seven episodes of Law & Order: Special Victims Unit on NBC. NBC nominated her for the Outstanding Guest Actress in a Drama Series for the 2016 Emmy Awards, but she did not progress to the final round.

=== Country music ===
With Tad Wilson, a former cast member (and her future husband), Phillips sang in the country duo, "10th & Carlisle."

== Personal life ==
Phillips has two sons, Jonah and Malcolm, from a prior marriage to Nicholas Rohlfing. She married Tad Wilson on July 15, 2017, and the two split up in 2021. Phillips came out publicly as queer in February 2022.

== Theatre credits ==
| Year | Title | Role | Theatre | Director(s) | Ref. |
|---|---|---|---|---|---|
| 1996 | **The Who's Tommy** | **Mrs. Walker** | **National Tour** | Victoria Bussert | |
| 1998–99 | **The Scarlet Pimpernel** | **Ensemble** (replacement) | **Minskoff Theatre** | Peter H. Hunt | |
| 1999–00 | **The Scarlet Pimpernel** | **Ensemble** (replacement) | **Neil Simon Theatre** | Peter H. Hunt | |
| 2005-06 | **The Who's Tommy** | **Mrs. Walker** | **European Tour** | Dan Stewart | |
| 2009–10 | **Next to Normal** | **Diana** (understudy) | **Booth Theatre** | Michael Greif | |
| 2011–12 | **Priscilla, Queen of the Desert** | **Marion** | **Palace Theatre** | Simon Phillips | |
| 2012 | **Leap of Faith** | **Marla McGowan** | **St. James Theatre** | Christopher Ashley | |
| 2015 | Unknown Soldier | Ellen | Williamstown Theater Festival | | |
| 2017 | Deathless | Michele Serling | Goodspeed Musicals | Tina Landau | |
| 2018 | **Dear Evan Hansen** | Heidi Hansen | U.S. National Tour | Michael Greif | |
| 2019-2020 | **Dear Evan Hansen** | Heidi Hansen | **Music Box Theatre** | Michael Greif | |
| 2025-present | **Redwood** | **Jesse** (standby) | **Nederlander Theatre** | Tina Landau | |

• Credits in bold indicate Broadway production(s)

== Filmography ==
=== Film ===
| Year | Title | Role | Notes | Ref. |
|---|---|---|---|---|
| 2012 | Bronx Warrants | Adele Destefano | Television film | |
| 2013 | La vida inesperada | Camarera Cantante | | |
| 2015 | Albert Cummings Project | Diane | Video short | |
| 2018 | Absent Mind | Kimberly | Post-production | |

=== Television ===
| Year | Title | Role | Notes | Ref. |
|---|---|---|---|---|
| 2013 | Unforgettable | Melanie Lambert | Episode: "Reunion" | |
| 2013–20 | Law & Order: Special Victims Unit | A.D.A. Pippa Cox | 8 episodes | |
| 2014 | Royal Pains | Actress | Episode: "A Bridge Not Quite Far Enough" | |
| 2017 | Elementary | Marine Archaeologist | Episode: "Dead Man's Tale" | |
| 2021 | Why Women Kill | Joan | Recurring role | |
