= Dear Evan Hansen =

2015 American musical by Benj Pasek and Justin Paul

- Broadway promotional poster
- Music: Benj Pasek; Justin Paul
- Lyrics: Benj Pasek; Justin Paul
- Book: Steven Levenson
- Premiere: July 30, 2015: Arena Stage, Washington, D.C.
- Productions: 2015 Washington; 2016 Off-Broadway; 2016 Broadway; 2018 First US tour 2019 West End; 2024 Second US tour 2024 UK tour
- Awards: Tony Award for Best Musical; Tony Award for Best Book of a Musical; Tony Award for Best Original Score; Grammy Award for Best Musical Theater Album; Drama Desk for Outstanding Lyrics; Obie Award for Musical Theatre; Drama League Award for Outstanding Production of a Broadway or Off-Broadway Production; Laurence Olivier Award for Best New Musical; Laurence Olivier Award for Best Original Score or New Orchestrations

Dear Evan Hansen is a stage musical with music and lyrics by Benj Pasek and Justin Paul, and a book by Steven Levenson. The musical follows Evan Hansen, a high school senior with social anxiety, "who invents an important role for himself in a tragedy that he did not earn".

The show's world premiere was at the Arena Stage in Washington, D.C. in July 2015. After an Off-Broadway production at Second Stage Theatre from March to May 2016, the musical transferred to Broadway, opening at the Music Box Theatre in December 2016. It closed on September 18, 2022.

The show received critical acclaim; at the 71st Tony Awards, it was nominated for nine awards, winning six, including Best Musical, Best Book, Best Score, Best Actor for Ben Platt, and Best Featured Actress for Rachel Bay Jones.

A film adaptation was directed by Stephen Chbosky and co-produced by Marc Platt, the father of Ben Platt, who reprised his performance in the title role. Released by Universal Pictures on September 24, 2021, it was a box-office disappointment and received negative reviews from critics. This, along with soft ticket sales caused by the COVID-19 pandemic, became the leading factors that would cause both the Broadway and West End productions to close.

The show continues to be performed worldwide, with Music Theatre International holding the licensing rights, which have been made available to amateur theatres as of December 8, 2025.

== Plot ==
=== Act 1 ===
Evan Hansen, a 17-year-old high school senior in Maryland with social anxiety and depression, is assigned by his therapist to write letters to himself detailing what will be good about each day, starting each with "Dear Evan Hansen, today is going to be a good day, and here's why". Evan's overworked mother, Heidi, suggests that Evan, having fallen out of a tree and broken his arm, ask people to sign his cast to make friends. Meanwhile, Cynthia and Larry Murphy struggle to connect with their own 17-year-old son, Connor, a sullen and equally depressed drug abuser who is abusive to his younger sister, Zoe ("Anybody Have a Map?").

At school, Evan meets compulsively-overachieving classmate Alana Beck and his reluctant "family friend" Jared Kleinman, both of whom neglect to sign his cast. Evan runs into Connor, who misinterprets his awkwardness for hostility and pushes him to the ground. Zoe, with whom Evan is infatuated, feels obliged to apologize for her brother's behavior. Evan wonders if his destiny in life is to always be ignored ("Waving Through a Window"). Evan writes the letter to himself in the school library, wondering how he could talk to Zoe and if anyone at school would notice if he disappeared ("Waving Through a Window" [Reprise #1]). Connor bumps into Evan again, this time ironically offering to sign Evan's cast. He finds Evan's letter on the printer and, thinking that Evan intentionally made the letter so Connor would find it, becomes furious and storms out, taking the letter with him. Meanwhile, Alana ponders her own inner anxieties ("Waving Through a Window" [Reprise #2]).

A few days later, Evan is called to the principal's office, where Connor's parents tell him that their son has died by suicide. They found Evan's letter in Connor's pocket, and mistakenly believe it is a suicide note Connor wrote to Evan. Despite Evan's fumbling attempts to explain the truth, the Murphys believe the two boys had a close friendship and invite Evan to their house for dinner. There, Evan tells them what he thinks they want to hear to avoid discomfort, pretending that he and Connor had secretly been best friends, and recounting a fictional version of the day he broke his arm at an abandoned apple orchard the family had visited years ago ("For Forever"). Evan enlists Jared's help in creating fake, backdated email conversations between him and Connor ("Sincerely, Me").

After Evan shows the Murphys the fake emails, Cynthia is ecstatic to "learn" that her son had a friend, but Larry is hurt, believing Connor took his family and his privileged life for granted, and Zoe still refuses to mourn Connor because of how he abused her ("Requiem"). However, after reading the "suicide note", Zoe notices that she is mentioned fondly and asks Evan why Connor would say that about her, so he tells her all the reasons he likes her under the guise of Connor saying them ("If I Could Tell Her"). Evan impulsively tries to kiss Zoe, but she pulls away.

Disgusted by the idea of Connor being forgotten, and motivated by Alana and a vision of Connor, Evan enlists Alana and Jared's help in founding "The Connor Project" to keep Connor's memory alive, which the Murphys eagerly encourage ("Disappear"). While making a speech at a school assembly for Connor, Evan suffers from a panic attack but composes himself, and the speech goes viral online; Zoe, overcome by the impact her brother and Evan have had, kisses him ("You Will Be Found").

=== Act 2 ===
Evan and Alana pitch a fundraising campaign on The Connor Project's website, to raise $50,000 to restore the abandoned apple orchard. Meanwhile, Jared continues to help Evan write fabricated emails, narrowly avoiding a fabricated incest subplot from Jared ("Sincerely Me" [Reprise]). After Heidi learns about Evan's speech about Connor online, she asks him why she never knew about this or the "friendship", and they get into a fight. Evan runs to the Murphys' house, where he bonds with Larry, who offers Evan Connor's old, unused baseball glove ("To Break In a Glove"). While on a date in his house, Evan offhandedly mentions that Heidi is struggling for funds to pay for his college ("Only Us"). Evan becomes preoccupied with Zoe and neglects Heidi, Jared, and The Connor Project.

On one of his many visits to the Murphys, Evan finds Zoe invited Heidi for dinner. The Murphys reveal they want to give Connor's college fund to Evan, offending Heidi that Evan would discuss her money troubles with others. At home, Heidi and Evan fight, with Evan telling her he has found family in her absence. Heidi, Alana, and Jared converge in Evan's conscience, compounding his guilt and doubt over his decisions ("Good for You"). Evan debates with the vision of Connor about whether he should tell the truth, where it’s revealed that Evan intentionally fell from the tree in his own suicide attempt ("For Forever" [Reprise]).

Alana has become suspicious about Evan's "friendship" with Connor, so Evan shows her Connor's "suicide note" to try and prove it. Realizing that the letter is the key to fulfilling the fundraising goal for The Connor Project, Alana posts it online without Evan’s consent. This also goes viral and achieves the goal, but the public begins to blame Connor's wealthy, previously dysfunctional family for his suicide ("You Will Be Found" [Reprise]), making them the targets of harassment. Evan walks in on the Murphys fighting among themselves about the blame and finally admits to them his fabrication; as the Murphys leave in disgust, Evan absorbs his perceived brokenness as inescapable ("Words Fail"). Heidi recognizes the "suicide note" online as one of Evan's therapy assignments and apologizes to him for not seeing how badly he has been hurting. She recalls the day his father moved out and promises that she will always be there for him when he needs her ("So Big/So Small").

A year later, Evan is still living with his mother, working at a store to earn enough money for college the next semester. Zoe invites him to meet her at the orchard, which has been reopened. He apologizes for the pain he caused and Zoe forgives him, saying the ordeal brought her family closer together. After they part ways, Evan mentally writes himself one last letter reflecting on the impact he has had on his community and questions what is to come next ("Finale").

== Roles and principal casts ==
=== Cast ===
Cast of Dear Evan Hansen
Character	First Reading	Second Reading	Third Reading	Washington, D.C.	Off-Broadway	Broadway	First US tour	Toronto	West End	Buenos Aires	Second US tour	Australia	UK tour	International tour	Netherlands tour
Character	2014			2015	2016		2018	2019		2023	2024			2025	2025
Evan Hansen	Ben Platt	Ben Platt	Ben Platt	Ben Platt	Ben Platt	Ben Platt	Ben Levi Ross	Robert Markus	Sam Tutty	Máximo Meyer	Michael Fabisch	Beau Woodbridge	Ryan Kopel	Ellis Kirk	Ward van Klinken
Heidi Hansen	Rachel Bay Jones	Rachel Bay Jones	Rachel Bay Jones	Rachel Bay Jones	Rachel Bay Jones	Rachel Bay Jones	Jessica Phillips	Jessica Sherman	Rebecca McKinnis	Julia Zenko	Bre Cade	Verity Hunt-Ballard	Alice Fearn	Rebecca McKinnis	Marlijn Weerdenburg
Zoe Murphy	Barrett Wilbert Weed	Laura Dreyfuss	Laura Dreyfuss	Laura Dreyfuss	Laura Dreyfuss	Laura Dreyfuss	Max McKenna	Stephanie La Rochelle	Lucy Anderson	Rocío Hernández	Hatty Ryan King	Georgia Laga'aia	Lauren Conroy	Zoë Athena	Lisa Schol
Cynthia Murphy	Jennifer Laura Thompson	Jennifer Laura Thompson	Jennifer Laura Thompson	Jennifer Laura Thompson	Jennifer Laura Thompson	Jennifer Laura Thompson	Christiane Noll	Claire Rankin	Lauren Ward	Laura Conforte	Caitlin Sams	Natalie O'Donnell	Helen Anker	Helen Anker	Cystine Carreon, Nyncke Beekhuyzen
Larry Murphy	Michael Park	Michael Park	Michael Park	Michael Park	John Dossett	Michael Park	Aaron Lazar	Evan Buliung	Rupert Young	Fabio Aste	Jeff Brooks	Martin Crewes	Richard Hurst	Hal Fowler	Alex van Bergen
Connor Murphy	Will Pullen	Mike Faist	Mike Faist	Mike Faist	Mike Faist	Mike Faist	Marrick Smith	Sean Patrick Dolan	Doug Colling	Guido Balzaretti	Alex Pharo	Harry Targett	Killian Thomas Lefevre	Rhys Hopkins	Pepijn van den Berg
Jared Kleinman	Alex Wyse	Will Roland	Will Roland	Will Roland	Will Roland	Will Roland	Jared Goldsmith	Alessandro Costantini	Jack Loxton	Mariano Condoluci	Gabriel Vernon Nunag	Jacob Rozario	Tom Dickerson	Tom Dickerson	Dave Rijnders
Alana Beck	Erin Wilhelmi	Emily Walton	Emily Skeggs	Alexis Molnar	Kristolyn Lloyd	Kristolyn Lloyd	Phoebe Koyabe	Shakura Dickerson	Nicole Raquel Dennis	Mariel Percossi	Makena Jackson	Carmel Rodrigues	Vivian Panka	Olivia-Faith Kamau	Naima Bayo

=== Notable Broadway cast replacements ===
- Evan Hansen: Noah Galvin, Taylor Trensch, Andrew Barth Feldman, Jordan Fisher, Roman Banks, Ben Levi Ross
- Heidi Hansen: Lisa Brescia, Jessica Phillips
- Zoe Murphy: Mallory Bechtel
- Cynthia Murphy: Christiane Noll
- Larry Murphy: Manoel Felciano
- Jared Kleinman: Gaten Matarazzo, Jared Goldsmith
- Connor Murphy: Alex Boniello

=== Character descriptions ===
- Evan Hansen – A high school senior with social anxiety. He is assigned by his therapist to write letters to himself about why each day will be good, which becomes the catalyst for the plot of the story (hence the name, Dear Evan Hansen).
- Heidi Hansen – Evan's mother, a nurse's aide who attends paralegal school at night, often leaving Evan on his own as a result.
- Connor Murphy – A classmate of Evan and high school senior who, like Evan, is also a social outcast with no friends, and is a frequent drug user, getting high to cope with his aggressive and violent tendencies. Connor eventually takes his own life during Act 1. His ghost appears in Evan's mind throughout the rest of the musical.
- Zoe Murphy – Connor's younger sister and Evan's longtime crush. She was never close to Connor, even hated him and thought he was a monster, but wishes she had known him better and turns to Evan after he lies and says he was friends with Connor.
- Cynthia Murphy – Connor and Zoe's stay-at-home mother. She is constantly trying to keep her fragile family from falling apart but is often unsuccessful.
- Larry Murphy – Connor and Zoe's busy and distant father.
- Jared Kleinman – Evan's droll and sarcastic friend. He helps Evan and Alana found The Connor Project.
- Alana Beck – Evan's earnest but melodramatic classmate. She is constantly looking for academic and extracurricular activities to boost her collegiate chances.

== Musical numbers ==
Act 1

- "Anybody Have a Map?" – Heidi, Cynthia
- "Waving Through a Window" – Evan, Company
- "Waving Through a Window (Reprise #1)"* – Evan
- "Waving Through a Window (Reprise #2)"* – Alana
- "For Forever" – Evan
- "Sincerely, Me" – Connor, Evan, Jared
- "Requiem" – Zoe, Cynthia, Larry
- "If I Could Tell Her" – Evan, Zoe
- "Disappear" – Connor, Evan, Alana, Jared, Larry, Cynthia, Zoe
- "You Will Be Found" – Evan, Alana, Jared, Zoe, Company, VC (virtual community)

Act 2

- "Sincerely, Me (Reprise)"* – Connor, Jared
- "To Break In a Glove" – Larry, Evan
- "Only Us" – Zoe, Evan
- "Good for You" – Heidi, Alana, Jared, Evan
- "For Forever (Reprise)"* – Connor
- "You Will Be Found (Reprise)"* – Alana, Jared, VC
- "Words Fail" – Evan
- "So Big/So Small" – Heidi
- "Finale" – Evan, Company

*Not included on the Original Broadway Cast Recording

=== Orchestration ===
The show is orchestrated for a band of eight, including the music director. The parts are: MD/Keyboard; Violin; Viola; Violoncello; Guitar 1; Guitar 2; Bass Guitar/Double Bass; and Drums. The show was orchestrated by Alex Lacamoire, who won the 2017 Tony Award for Best Orchestrations for his work.

=== Recording ===
An original Broadway cast album was released at midnight on January 27, 2017, by Atlantic Records. The second song on the album, "Waving Through a Window", was released as a special early download for those who had pre-ordered the album. The fifth song, "Requiem", was made available to stream for 24 hours on January 19, 2017, a week before the release of the cast recording. The song was released as a second pre-order bonus the next day. The recording of the Act 1 finale "You Will Be Found" was available for a first listen online on January 23, 2017. The cast album debuted at number 8 on the February 25 Billboard 200. The cast album became available in compact disc format on February 17, 2017. The cast album was produced by Alex Lacamoire and featured the band from both the original off-Broadway and Broadway productions, including Ben Cohn (piano), Jamie Eblen (drums), Justin Goldner and Dillon Kondor (guitars), Rob Jost (bass), Justin Smith, Todd Low and Adele Stein (strings). It won the 2018 Grammy Award for Best Musical Theater Album.

Producers announced a deluxe album on September 26, 2018. The deluxe album contains all of the songs in the Original Broadway Cast Recording, in addition to cut songs and covers. The cut song "Part of Me" was available exclusively on Billboard.com before it was officially released. The album was to be released on October 19; however, it was delayed to November 2. American singer Katy Perry re-recorded "Waving Through a Window" to promote the show's national tour. Other songs on the deluxe album include "Obvious" sung by Taylor Trensch, the precursor to "If I Could Tell Her", "Hiding in Your Hands" sung by Mallory Bechtel which was replaced by "Requiem", and an acoustic version of "Disappear" sung by Taylor Trensch and Alex Boniello.

== Background ==
There were several readings prior to the first stage production, all in New York:

- May 2014 at Pearl Studios
- July 2014 at Chelsea Studios
- September 2014 at Manhattan Movement and Arts Studio

A full workshop took place in March 2015 at Gibney Dance Center. It was initially called The PPL Project. Platt was involved in all readings and the workshop.

== Productions ==
Poster of the World Premiere production at Arena Stage, Washington, D.C. in 2015

=== Washington D.C. (2015) ===
Dear Evan Hansen premiered at the Arena Stage in Washington, D.C., where it ran from July 10 to August 23, 2015, with an official opening on July 30. Directed by Michael Greif, the production featured orchestrations by Alex Lacamoire, music direction by Ben Cohn, set design by David Korins and projection design by Peter Nigrini. Ben Platt featured in the title role.

=== Off-Broadway (2016) ===
The musical began previews at the Second Stage Theater on March 26, 2016, with an official opening on May 1. The cast featured Ben Platt, Laura Dreyfuss, Mike Faist, Rachel Bay Jones, Will Roland, and Jennifer Laura Thompson repeating their roles from the Arena Stage production. New cast members were John Dossett and Kristolyn Lloyd. Michael Greif again directed, with choreography by Danny Mefford. The off-Broadway engagement closed on May 29, 2016.

=== Broadway (2016–2022) ===
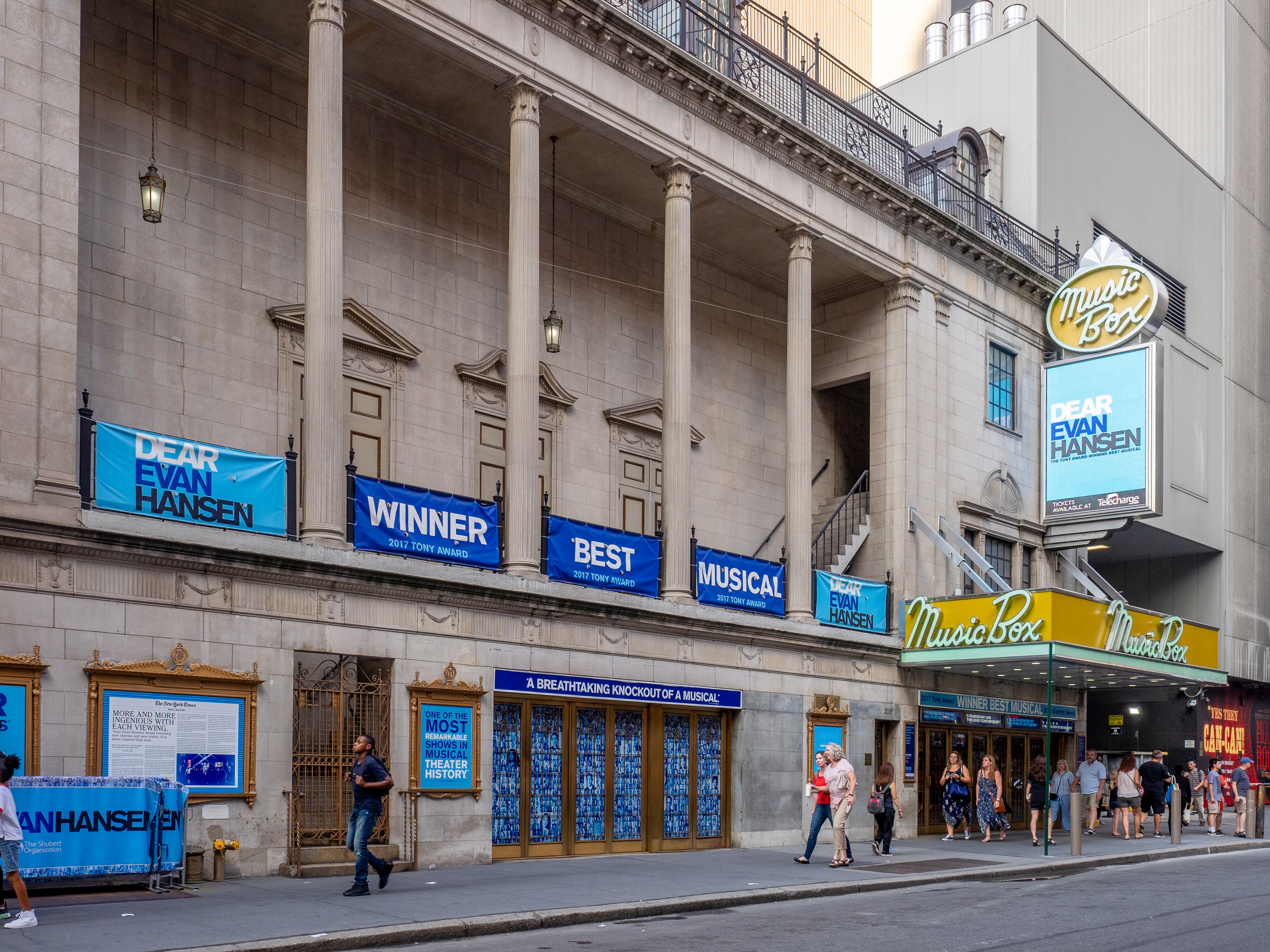
Branding as seen on the Music Box Theatre

The show premiered on Broadway on November 14, 2016, in previews, and officially opened on December 4. After announcing that performances would take place at the Belasco Theatre, in mid-September 2016, producers announced that the show would instead perform at the Music Box Theatre. Michael Park, who originated the role of Larry in the Arena Stage production, returned for the Broadway production (replacing John Dossett who went on to the musical War Paint). All other cast members from the Second Stage production returned for the Broadway engagement. Ben Platt played his last performance on November 19, 2017. Noah Galvin replaced Platt on November 21, 2017, and played until February 2018. Taylor Trensch played two performances in the show before officially replacing Galvin on February 6, 2018. The 2018 Jimmy Award winner, Andrew Barth Feldman, made his Broadway debut, replacing Trensch, on January 30, 2019. After Andrew's run was over, Jordan Fisher assumed the role of Evan Hansen on January 28, 2020.

In November 2018, producers donated several items from the Broadway run of the musical, including a shirt, arm cast, button for The Connor Project, copy of the "Dear Evan Hansen" letter, and a piece of sheet music, to the National Museum of American History at the Smithsonian Institution.

On March 12, 2020, the show suspended production due to the COVID-19 pandemic. Performances resumed on December 11, 2021, with Fisher returning as Evan Hansen. The returning company included all who were there at the time of the shutdown. The show played its final performance on Broadway on September 18, 2022, after 21 preview performances and 1,678 regular performances, though some sources tally the full run at 1,672 regular performances.

=== First US national tour (2018–2023) ===
A US tour launched in October 2018 in Denver Center for the Performing Arts' Buell Theatre in October 2018. Starring Ben Levi Ross in the title role and by December 2018 was scheduled for over 50 cities. It also starred Jessica Phillips in the role of Heidi Hansen, Jared Goldsmith in the role of Jared Kleinman, and Phoebe Koyabe in the role of Alana Beck. Also starring in the tour were Christiane Noll in the role of Cynthia Murphy, Aaron Lazar as Larry Murphy, Marrick Smith in the role of Connor Murphy, Max McKenna in the role of Zoe Murphy.

The second year of the tour began on September 25, 2019, in Milwaukee, with Stephen Christopher Anthony stepping in to the role of Evan Hansen full-time, former Evan/Jared/Connor understudy Noah Kieserman as Connor Murphy, former Zoe/Alana understudy Ciara Alyse Harris as Alana Beck, John Hemphill as Larry Murphy, and Toronto cast alums Stephanie La Rochelle as Zoe Murphy, Jessica Sherman as Heidi Hansen, Claire Rankin as Cynthia Murphy, and Alessandro Costantini as Jared Kleinman.

The final touring cast included Anthony Norman as Evan Hansen, Alaina Anderson as Zoe Murphy, Coleen Sexton as Heidi Hansen, Lili Thomas as Cynthia Murphy, Nikhil Saboo as Connor Murphy, John Hemphill as Larry Murphy, Pablo David Laucerica as Jared Klienman, and Micaela Lamas as Alana Beck. Jeffrey Cornelius was the Evan alternate, along with understudies Valeria Ceballos, Ian Coursey, Haile Ferrier, Reese Sebastian, Gillian Jackson Han, Daniel Sullivan, Keely Vasquez, Kelsey Venter, and Pierce Wheeler.

The tour played its final performance on July 2, 2023, at the Koger Center for the Arts in Columbia, South Carolina.

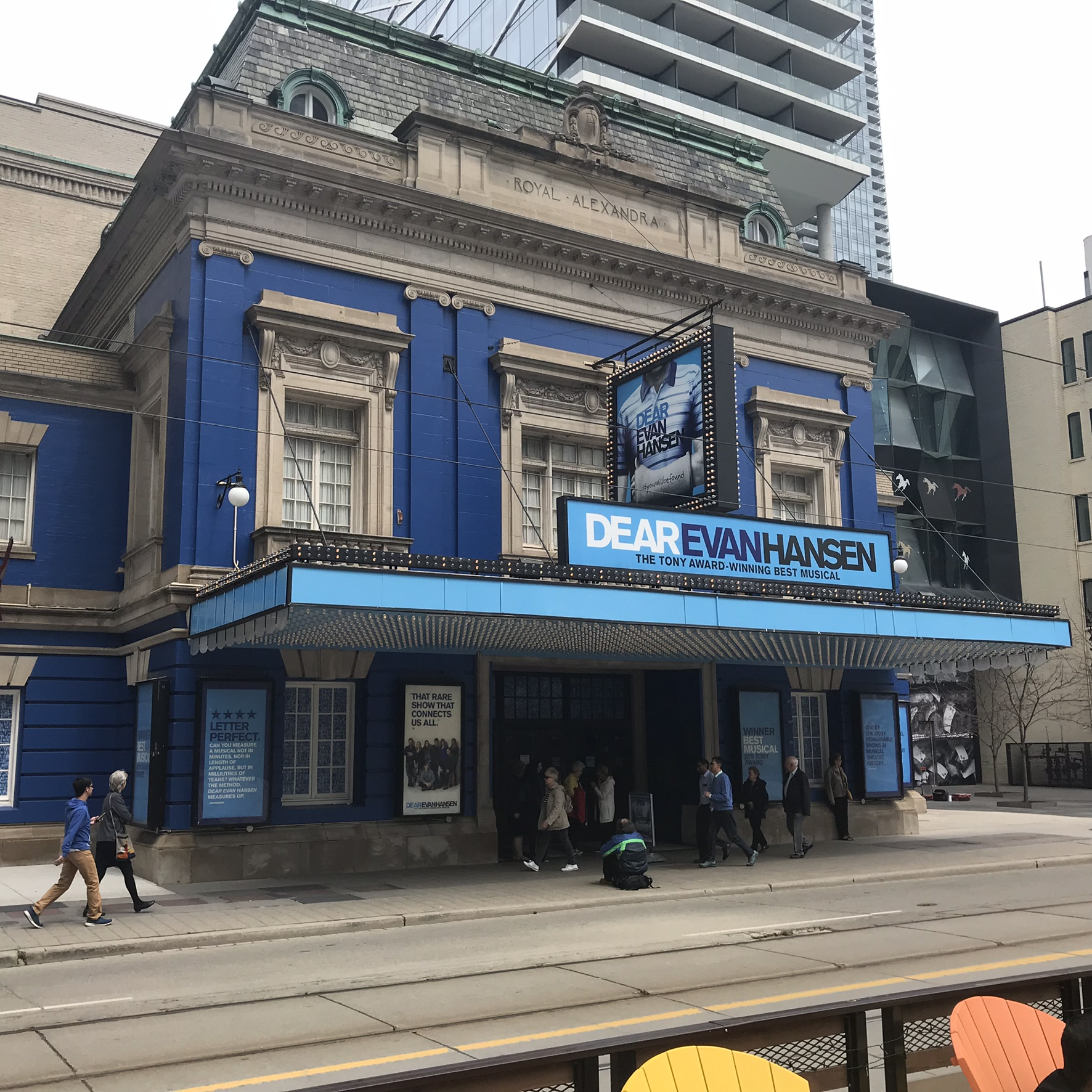
Branding as seen on the Royal Alexandra Theatre in Toronto

=== Toronto (2019) ===
The show played its first international performance at the Royal Alexandra Theatre in Toronto. The production began previews on March 5, 2019, and opened on March 28, 2019. The role of Evan Hansen was played by Robert Markus, and Zachary Noah Piser on Wednesday and Saturday matinees. The cast also included Jessica Sherman as Heidi Hansen, Evan Buliung as Larry Murphy, Claire Rankin as Cynthia Murphy, Alessandro Costantini as Jared Kleinman, Shakura Dickson as Alana Beck, Sean Patrick Dolan as Connor Murphy and Stephanie La Rochelle as Zoe Murphy. Despite extending its booking period through September, the production closed early on July 21, 2019.

=== West End (2019–2022) ===
A West End production opened at the Noël Coward Theatre in London from November 2019. The show began previews on October 29, before officially opening on November 19. The role of Evan Hansen was played by Sam Tutty, who won Laurence Olivier Award for Best Actor in a Leading Role in a Musical for his performance. At only 22 years old of age, he became one of the youngest winners in the category. The rest of the cast included Rebecca McKinnis as Heidi Hansen, Lauren Ward as Cynthia Murphy, Rupert Young as Larry Murphy, Jack Loxton as Jared Kleinman, Iona Fraser as Alana Beck, Lucy Anderson as Zoe and Doug Colling as Connor Murphy. Understudies and covers included Natalie Kassanga and Courtney Stapleton.

The show closed in March 2020 due to the COVID-19 pandemic in the United Kingdom and reopened on October 26, 2021, with all of the cast returning with the exception of Nicole Raquel Dennis, whose role as Alana was taken over by Iona Fraser. The production played its final performance in the West End on October 22, 2022.

=== Buenos Aires (2023–2024) ===
A Buenos Aires production, directed by Sebastián Irigo, opened at the Metropolitan Theatre in May 2023 and ended in March 2024. The cast includes Máximo Meyer as Evan Hansen, Julia Zenko as Heidi Hansen, Rochi Hernandez as Zoe Murphy, Laura Conforte as Cynthia Murphy, Fabio Aste and Diego Mariani as Larry Murphy, Guido Balzaretti and Alan Madanes as Connor Murphy, Mariano Condolucci as Jared Kleinman and Mariel Percossi as Alana Beck.

=== Finland (2023) ===
A Finnish production opened on September 28, 2023, at the Helsinki City Theatre in Helsinki. The script and songs were translated for the production by Reita Lounatvuori and Hanna Kaila. The production was directed by Kari Arffman and starred Petja Pulkkinen as Evan Hansen, Nina Tapio as Heidi Hansen, Niki Rautén as Connor Murphy, Riikka Riikonen as Zoe Murphy, Sanna Majuri as Cynthia Murphy, Antti Timonen as Larry Murphy, Lumi Aunio as Alana Beck and Samuli Pajunen as Jared Kleinman.

=== South Korea (2024) ===
A Korean production opened on March 28, 2024, at the Chungmu Arts Center in Seoul by S&Co. The script was translated for the production by Han Jeong-sik, while the songs were translated by Han Jeong-sik and Yang Joo-in. The Korean production was directed by Park So-young, with Yang Joo-in and Ben Cohn as music supervisor. The lead role of Evan Hansen was triple-cast, featuring Park Kang-hyun, Kim Sung-kyu and Lim Kyu-hyung. The supporting roles were double-cast: Kim Sun-young and Shin Young-sook as Heidi Hansen, Yoon Seung-woo and Lim Ji-sub as Connor Murphy, Kang Ji-hye and Hong Seo-yeong as Zoe Murphy, Jang Hyun-sung and Yoon Seok-won as Larry Murphy, An Si-ha and Han Yu-ran as Cynthia Murphy and Lee Da-jeong and Yeom Hui-jin as Alana Beck, with the exception of the role of Jared Kleinman played by Cho Yong-hwi. Its Seoul production concluded on June 23, 2024 and subsequently staged performances in Busan from July 4 to July 21, 2024.

=== Second US National tour (2024–2025) ===
A non-equity second US tour, based on the original Broadway staging, officially opened on September 10, 2024, at Theatre Under the Stars in Houston, Texas. Crossroads Live North America produces the tour. The cast includes Michael Fabisch as Evan Hansen, Hatty Ryan King as Zoe Murphy, Bre Cade as Heidi Hansen, Caitlin Sams as Cynthia Murphy, Alex Pharo as Connor Murphy, Jeff Brooks as Larry Murphy, Gabriel Vernon Nunag as Jared Kleinman, and Makena Jackson as Alana Beck. The tour concluded on April 27th, 2025.

=== UK tour (2024) ===
A new UK tour co-produced by Nottingham Playhouse and Ambassador Theatre Group opened in Nottingham on September 9, 2024, directed by Adam Penford before touring until May 2025. The tour is an updated non-replica version of the show. In February 2024, it was announced that the production would team up with TikTok to hold open-call auditions for both the teen and adult roles. Ryan Kopel will play Evan Hansen, with the rest of the cast comprising Lauren Conroy as Zoe Murphy, Alice Fearn as Heidi Hansen, Helen Anker as Cynthia Murphy, Richard Hurst as Larry Murphy, Killian Thomas Lefevre as Connor Murphy, Tom Dickerson as Jared Kleinman, and Vivian Panka as Alana Beck. The production premiered on September 9, 2024.

=== Australia (2024–2025) ===
An Australian non-replica production was announced on September 14, 2023, as part of the Sydney Theatre Company's 2024 program in co-production with the Michael Cassel Group. The production, directed by Dean Bryant and with new set designs by Jeremy Allen, premiered on October 12, 2024 at the Roslyn Packer Theatre and closed on December 1. It opened in Melbourne on December 13, 2024. The production was set to tour to Adelaide and Canberra after, but was cancelled due to poor ticket sales. The tour closed in Melbourne on February 16, 2025.

=== Sweden (2025) ===
A Swedish production was announced in May 2024, as part of the 2025 program at Intiman in Stockholm. The production premiered on January 23, 2025, starring Martin Stokke Mathiesen as the title character, Clara Henry as Zoe Murphy and Joel Adolphson as Jared Kleinmann. The script was translated to Swedish by Markus Virta, who also directed the production. The production continued to run until April 12, 2025.

=== Philippines (2025) ===
A Philippine transfer of the UK tour was announced in March 2025, with the premiere slated to take place in September. The production was presented through a special agreement with Music Theater International and GMG Productions. The musical ran from September 4 to October 5, 2025 at the Theatre at Solaire starring Ellis Kirk as Evan Hansen, Rebecca McKinnis as Heidi Hansen, Zoë Athena as Zoe Murphy, Helen Anker as Cynthia Murphy, Hal Fowler as Larry Murphy, Rhys Hopkins as Connor Murphy, Tom Dickerson as Jared Kleinman, and Olivia-Faith Kamau as Alana Beck. Sonny Monaghan will serve as the alternate Evan Hansen.

=== Singapore (2025) ===
A Singapore production presented by BASE Entertainment Asia premiered on October 30, 2025 and ran until November 16, 2025 at the Sands Theatre, Marina Bay Sands.

=== Netherlands (2025) ===
A Dutch production presented by Medialane Theater and Theater Alliantie was officially announced on August 17, 2024. Earlier, in 2020, Dutch versions of the songs were recorded through the 'Jij Komt Terecht'-project. Until this day, there is a crowdfunding action to release the songs on Spotify. This project is separate from the Dutch theatre production. Initially, the 2025 production was only supposed to run for three weeks in DeLaMar Theater in Amsterdam, but due to its enthusiastic reception it was decided to start a tour, including a return to DeLaMar in late August. Try-outs started on Wednesday, June 11, 2025 and it premiered on Monday, June 16, 2025 The tour started on September 3 and concluded on November 8, 2025. Danny Westerweel was responsible for the new translation and on April 17, 2025 the single "Zwaaien tot het pijn doet" ("Waving Through a Window") was released for streaming. The first live performance of this song, also the first public preview of the play, was during the Dutch annual Musical Awards Gala. A shortened version of "Groetjes van mij" ("Sincerely, Me") was performed live at the annual Musical Awards: The Kick-Off show in front of Het Loo Palace in Apeldoorn on Sunday, August 31, 2025.

=== Denmark (2026–present) ===
In 2026, Dear Evan Hansen received its first professional production in Denmark. The musical was produced in collaboration between the Royal Danish Theatre and Aarhus Theatre and was staged at the Skuespilhuset in Copenhagen before transferring to Aarhus Theatre as part of a shared production run.

The role of Evan Hansen was performed by Thorbjørn Hedegaard, while the role of Zoe Murphy was played by Sara Viktoria Bjerregaard.

The production was performed in Danish, with the dialogue and song lyrics translated from the original English version. It marked the musical’s official Danish premiere. The Danish production received strong critical acclaim and was met with high audience demand during its run

=== Spain (2026–present) ===
A Spanish production started its run in the Rialto Theater in Madrid on October 23, 2026. It was presented by ATG Entertainment and adapted by the brothers Alejandro and David Serrano, serving the latter also as the director. Both the text and the lyrics were translated into Spanish.

=== Non-replica productions ===
An Israeli production was announced on May 24, 2023, as part of the Cameri Theatre's 2023–24 season; however, it did not occur due to the impact of the Gaza war. It was expected to run in late 2023 and was set to be directed by Amit Apte and star Alon Sandler in the title role. The production later started performances in January 2025. Due to cast illness, the title role was played by Refael Abbas in the show's premiere.

A Brazilian production opened on August 2, 2024, at the Teatro Liberdade, in São Paulo. Directed by Tadeu Aguiar, with Liliane Secco as music supervisor and scenography by Natália Lana, starring Gab Lara as Evan Hansen, Vanessa Gerbelli as Heidi Hansen, Thati Lopes as Zoey Murphy, Flavia Santana as Cynthia Murphy, Mouhamed Harfouch as Larry Murphy, Hugo Bonemer as Connor Murphy, Gui Figueiredo as Jared Kleinman, and Tati Christine as Alana Beck. The production ran until September 22, 2024.

A Singaporean non-replica production by Pangdemonium Theatre Company was announced in October 2023 and was set to premiere in late 2024. It opened on October 11, 2024 at the Victoria Theatre and was directed by Tracie Pang. The production was the Southeast Asian premiere of the show and featured Filipino-born Angelo Martinez in his professional debut as Evan Hansen as well as Filipino singer and actor Gian Magdangal as Larry Murphy. Initially scheduled to run from October 11 to November 3, 2024, the run was extended to November 10, 2024.

Another non-replica production played at The Muny in St. Louis, Missouri from July 28 to August 3, 2025, coinciding with the musical's 10th anniversary and marking its Midwest regional premiere. Rob Ruggiero served as director, with Beth Crandall as choreographer and Roberto Sinha as music director/conductor. The cast featured Michael Fabisch reprising his role as Evan from the US non-equity tour. Also starring were Jackie Burns as Heidi, Maggie Lakis as Cynthia, Rob McClure as Larry, Afra Sophia Tully as Zoe, Joshua Bess as Connor, Bryan Munar as Jared, and Savy Jackson as Alana.

== Critical response ==
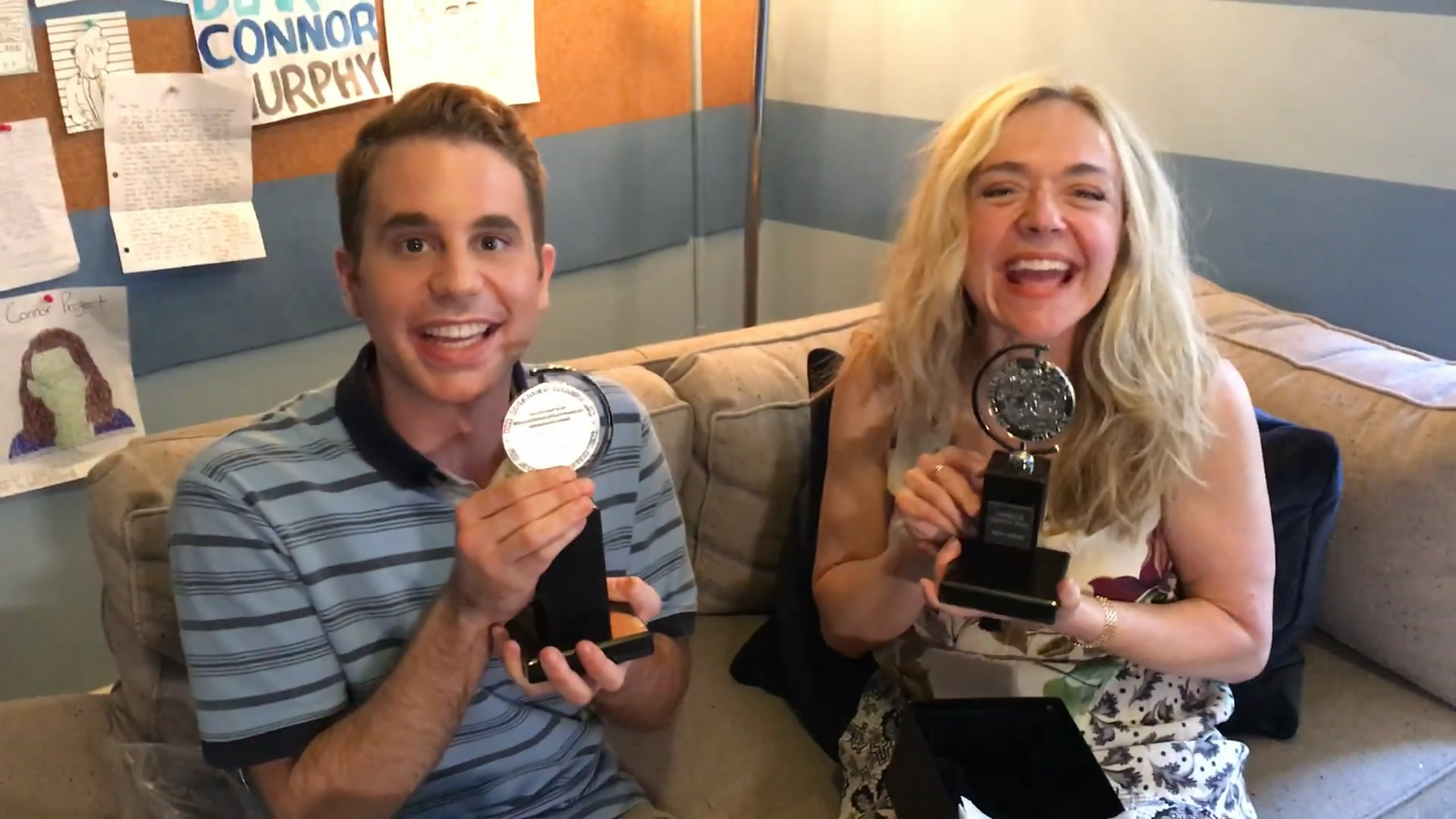
Ben Platt and Rachel Bay Jones received praise for originating the roles of Evan Hansen and Heidi Hansen, and won the Tony Awards for Best Actor in a Musical and Best Featured Actress in a Musical, respectively.

The musical has received acclaim, particularly for Platt's leading performance, the lyrics and book. The story has also provided and encouraged open dialogue about its themes of mental illness and youth suicide. Dear Evan Hansen is a recipient of the 2015 Edgerton Foundation New Play Award.

Derek Mong, in his review of the musical at the Arena Stage, wrote that the "inventive set design by David Korins...that transforms a small stage into a platform for the most intimate living room where a mother and son share a heart-to-heart to the physical abyss of internet cyberspace... book by Steven Levenson... lyrics and music by Benj Pasek and Justin Paul... heartfelt lyrics with universal appeal joined by the perfect, oftentimes acoustic, accompaniment that can change the mood from somber to celebratory to sinister in a single bar of music." Barbara Mackay in reviewing the Arena Stage production for TheatreMania wrote: "Levenson, Pasek, and Paul set themselves two high, untraditional bars in Evan Hansen: exploring a community's grief and examining a lonely protagonist who desperately wants to connect with that community... Ben Platt is outstanding as Evan... Since the success of the musical depends entirely on whether Evan's solitary nature appears funny or weird, Evan's ability to laugh at himself and make the audience laugh is crucial. Platt is charming as he eternally twists his shirt tails and hangs his head... Although the themes of grief and loneliness are serious, the musical is anything but somber. It addresses challenging facts of life. But from start to finish, when Evan leaves his room and finds an authentic life outside it, Dear Evan Hansen contains far more joy than sadness."

Charles Isherwood, in his review of the Second Stage production for The New York Times, noted: "The songs, by Benj Pasek and Justin Paul (Dogfight, A Christmas Story), strike the same complex notes, with shapely, heartfelt lyrics that expose the tensions and conflicts that Connor's death and Evan's involvement cause in both families. The music, played by a small but excellent band on a platform upstage, is appealingly unstrident pop-rock, with generous doses of acoustic guitar, keyboards and strings. It's the finest, most emotionally resonant score yet from this promising young songwriting team." Susan Davidson, in her review of the Arena Stage production for CurtainUp, noted: "it helps to suspend the disbelief that sullen, anti-social teenagers can change quickly. Surely that's a process requiring time-released hormonal adjustments. It is hard to accept that a long-admired-from-afar girl can change Evan's outlook on life so rapidly or that Connor's teenage disequilibrium leads him to do what he does. Coming through loud and clear, however, is the fact that what starts as deceit can be blown totally out of proportion by the Internet where lies are disseminated with lightning speed leaving plenty of victims in their wake [...] The music is pleasant, not terribly original but good enough to get toes tapping. Benj Pasek and Justin Paul's ballads stand out, particularly Heidi's 'So Big/So Small,' Evan's 'Words Fail' and Zoe and Evan's young sweethearts duet 'Only Us.'"

The overall public reception of the show was not without criticism. Some critics argue that it romanticizes or sanitizes mental illness by not naming Evan's diagnosis. It also suggested that the show glorifies suicide, with questions about Connor's death and whether or not Evan's suicide attempt was intentional. Stacey Mindich, lead producer of the Broadway, Tour and West End productions, claimed in her opening speech at the You Will Be Found: A Mental Health Month Symposium event on May 10, 2018, that she and the team did not want the show to be called a "suicide musical" in order to gain an audience.

The protagonist's motives and choices have also been criticized. Jason Zinoman in a piece for Slate argues that the musical "employs many different tactics to prevent us from seeing Evan Hansen as a jerk, but its most audacious is to not allow anyone onstage to see him that way...The choice to give Evan Hansen no comeuppance doesn't make dramatic sense. But you don't need to be too cynical to see its commercial and emotional logic. Not giving voice to anger at Evan Hansen avoids the more unpleasant ramifications of his exploitation of a tragedy for his own personal gain, which might complicate the audience's reaction to him. Evan Hansen isn't as interested in these themes as it is in keeping the focus on the insecurity of the outsider, the nerd, the teenager yearning for acceptance. (To be fair, it is also interested in Evan's mother, who has one of the most moving songs in the show.)"

Hilton Als of The New Yorker was also critical, writing "It would have been amazing if Levenson had continued to dig into Evan's awfulness. Instead, he takes side trips into tired knee-jerk liberalism and therapeutic healing. (One of the more uncomfortable moments in the show is when Alana, a black character, played by Kristolyn Lloyd as a P.C. bully, screams about her invisibility. Levenson and the others are trying to keep up with the times and diversify, but why does it have to feel so forced and tired?) Evan confesses his deceit and makes it clear that all he wanted, really, was to be loved, because of, well, that absent daddy, that inattentive mommy, and the nastiness of the world. With that false move, the show's creators risk destroying what's so spikily fascinating about Evan. Still, until the second act, and despite it, Platt gives a performance that binds us to him in the way that Holden Caulfield, that other teen with a voice, did—especially when he said, 'It's funny. Don't ever tell anybody anything. If you do, you start missing everybody.'"

The West End production received many four- and five-star reviews. Writing in The Stage, Tim Bano said "Lucy Anderson makes a striking professional debut as Evan's crush Zoe, and Rebecca McKinnis does strong work as Heidi Hansen", while in Theatre Weekly's five-star review, Greg Stewart commented "Sam Tutty gives the performance of the decade."

== Awards and honors ==
=== Original Washington, D.C., production ===
Year	Award ceremony	Category	Nominee	Result
2016	Helen Hayes Award	Outstanding Musical—HAYES Production		Won
2016	Helen Hayes Award	Outstanding Direction of a Musical—HAYES Production	Michael Greif	Won
2016	Helen Hayes Award	Outstanding Supporting Actress in a Musical—HAYES Production	Laura Dreyfuss	Nominated
2016	Helen Hayes Award	Outstanding Supporting Actress in a Musical—HAYES Production	Jennifer Laura Thompson	Nominated
2016	Helen Hayes Award	Outstanding Ensemble in a Musical—HAYES Production		Won
2016	Helen Hayes Award	Outstanding Lighting Design—HAYES Production	Japhy Weideman	Nominated
2016	Helen Hayes Award	Outstanding Musical Direction—HAYES Production	Ben Cohn	Nominated
2016	Helen Hayes Award	Outstanding Set Design—HAYES Production	David Kornis (Set Design) and Peter Nigrini (Projection Design)	Nominated
2016	Helen Hayes Award	The Charles MacArthur Award for Outstanding Original New Play or Musical	Steven Levenson (Book), Benj Pasek and Justin Paul (Lyrics & Music)	Nominated

=== Original off-Broadway production ===
Year	Award ceremony	Category	Nominee	Result
2016	Outer Critics Circle Awards	Outstanding New Off-Broadway Musical		Won
2016	Outer Critics Circle Awards	Outstanding New Score	Benj Pasek and Justin Paul	Nominated
2016	Outer Critics Circle Awards	Outstanding Book of a Musical	Steven Levenson	Won
2016	Outer Critics Circle Awards	Outstanding Director of a Musical	Michael Greif	Nominated
2016	Outer Critics Circle Awards	Outstanding Actor in a Musical	Ben Platt	Nominated
2016	Outer Critics Circle Awards	Outstanding Projection Design	Peter Nigrini	Nominated
2016	Off Broadway Alliance Awards	Best New Musical		Nominated
2016	Drama League Award	Outstanding Production of a Broadway or Off-Broadway Musical		Nominated
2016	Drama League Award	Distinguished Performance	Ben Platt	Nominated
2016	Drama Desk Awards	Outstanding Lyrics	Benj Pasek and Justin Paul	Won
2016	Drama Desk Awards	Outstanding Featured Actress in a Musical	Rachel Bay Jones	Nominated
2016	Drama Desk Awards	Outstanding Projection Design	Peter Nigrini	Nominated
2016	Obie Awards	Obie Award for Musical Theatre	Steven Levenson (Book), Benj Pasek and Justin Paul (Lyrics & Music)	Won
2016	Obie Awards	Obie Award for Distinguished Performance by an Actor	Ben Platt	Won
2017	Lucille Lortel Awards	Outstanding Musical		Nominated
2017	Lucille Lortel Awards	Outstanding Lead Actor in a Musical	Ben Platt	Won
2017	Lucille Lortel Awards	Outstanding Featured Actress in a Musical	Rachel Bay Jones	Won
2017	Lucille Lortel Awards	Outstanding Projection Design	Peter Nigrini	Nominated

=== Original Broadway production ===
Year	Award Ceremony	Category	Nominee	Result
2017	Tony Awards	Best Musical		Won
2017	Tony Awards	Best Book of a Musical	Steven Levenson	Won
2017	Tony Awards	Best Original Score	Benj Pasek and Justin Paul	Won
2017	Tony Awards	Best Performance by a Leading Actor in a Musical	Ben Platt	Won
2017	Tony Awards	Best Performance by an Actor in a Featured Role in a Musical	Mike Faist	Nominated
2017	Tony Awards	Best Performance by an Actress in a Featured Role in a Musical	Rachel Bay Jones	Won
2017	Tony Awards	Best Lighting Design of a Musical	Japhy Weideman	Nominated
2017	Tony Awards	Best Direction of a Musical	Michael Greif	Nominated
2017	Tony Awards	Best Orchestrations	Alex Lacamoire	Won
2017	Drama League Awards	Outstanding Production of a Broadway or Off-Broadway Production		Won
2017	Drama League Awards	Distinguished Performance	Ben Platt	Won
2017	Drama League Awards	Distinguished Performance	Rachel Bay Jones	Nominated
2018	Grammy Awards	Best Musical Theater Album		Won
2018	Daytime Emmy Awards	Outstanding Musical Performance in a Daytime Program		Won

=== Original West End production ===
Year	Award	Category	Nominee	Result
2019	Critics' Circle Theatre Award	Most Promising Newcomer	Sam Tutty	Won
2020	Laurence Olivier Award	Best New Musical		Won
2020	Laurence Olivier Award	Best Actor in a Leading Role in a Musical	Sam Tutty	Won
2020	Laurence Olivier Award	Best Actor in a Supporting Role in a Musical	Jack Loxton	Nominated
2020	Laurence Olivier Award	Best Actor in a Supporting Role in a Musical	Rupert Young	Nominated
2020	Laurence Olivier Award	Best Actress in a Supporting Role in a Musical	Lucy Anderson	Nominated
2020	Laurence Olivier Award	Best Actress in a Supporting Role in a Musical	Lauren Ward	Nominated
2020	Laurence Olivier Award	Best Original Score or New Orchestrations	Alex Lacamoire, Benj Pasek and Justin Paul	Won

== Adaptations ==
=== Novelization ===
The musical was adapted into a young adult novel by actor and singer-songwriter Val Emmich, in collaboration with Pasek, Paul, and Levenson. The novel, which features additional material based on scenes and songs cut from the show's development that flesh out and expand upon the story, was released by Little, Brown Books for Young Readers on October 9, 2018. An audiobook was released on the same date with narrations by Ben Levi Ross, Mike Faist, and Mallory Bechtel. It debuted on the New York Times bestseller list at #2 for the week of October 28, 2018.

=== Film ===
On November 29, 2018, it was announced that Universal Pictures optioned the musical to make a film version. It is directed by Stephen Chbosky from a screenplay by Levenson, who executive produced with Michael Bederman, Mindich, Pasek and Paul. Marc Platt and Adam Siegel serve as producers. Ben Platt reprised his performance in the title role, as did Colton Ryan as Connor Murphy, a role in which he understudied in the Broadway production. Joining them were Kaitlyn Dever as Zoe Murphy, Julianne Moore as Heidi Hansen, Amy Adams as Cynthia Murphy, Danny Pino as Larry Murphy, Nik Dodani as Jared Kleinman and Amandla Stenberg as Alana Beck. Stenberg collaborated with Pasek and Paul on the writing of "The Anonymous Ones," a new song for her character, whose role has been expanded for the film. The character of Larry Murphy was re-conceived as Larry Mora, the step-father of Zoe and Connor rather than their biological father as in the stage version. The character of Jared Kleinman was also re-conceived as "Jared Kalwani" to accommodate Dodani's casting. The film marked the acting debuts of DeMarius Copes, Gerald Caesar and Isaac Cole Powell, all of whom played new characters created for the film. Copes portrayed Oliver, one of Zoe's friends, while Caesar and Powell played high school students Josh and Rhys. Newcomer Liz Kate also appeared in the film as Gemma.

Filming began on August 25, 2020, in Atlanta, Georgia, and Los Angeles, California. On December 15, 2020, Universal Filmed Entertainment Group chairwoman Donna Langley confirmed that the film would wrap production that month. On May 18, 2021, Ben Platt confirmed that another new song, entitled "A Little Closer," was written for the film, later revealed to have been written for Connor Murphy. The songs "Disappear," "To Break In a Glove," "Anybody Have a Map?" and "Good for You," were omitted, but the latter two, however, are heard instrumentally played by the high school's marching band in a scene early in the film. The ending was also altered for the film, so that, according to Platt, it can hold "the deceitful Evan to account more than the musical did."

The film had its world premiere as the Opening Night Gala Presentation of the 2021 Toronto International Film Festival on September 9, 2021, to be followed by a theatrical release on September 24, 2021, including IMAX screenings. The film was not as well-received as the stage version and was, months prior to the premiere, criticized by the public, who accused it of nepotism for the filmmakers' decision to have Platt, at age 27, reprise his role as a teenager. The film had an opening weekend box office of $7.5 million worldwide and finished its run in theaters with $19.1 million. It received four nominations at the 42nd Golden Raspberry Awards, including Worst Director, Worst Actor (for Ben Platt) and Worst Supporting Actress (for Amy Adams).

== Books ==
- Levenson, Steven; Pasek, Benj; Paul, Justin (2017). Dear Evan Hansen. Theatre Communications Group. 144. ISBN 978-1559365604.
- Levenson, Steven; Pasek, Benj; Paul, Justin (2017). Dear Evan Hansen: Through the Window. Grand Central Publishing. 224. ISBN 978-1538761915.

== See also ==
- List of Tony Award- and Olivier Award-winning musicals
- World's Greatest Dad – a 2009 black-comedy drama film that the musical has been compared to
