= Alice Fearn =

English score vocalist

- Born: 23 October 1983 (age 42); Bath, England
- Education: Mountview Academy of Theatre Arts
- Occupations: Actress; singer
- Years active: 2004–present
- Spouse: Gavin Alex Wood (m. 2019)
- Website: www.alicefearn.com

Alice Fearn (born 23 October 1983) is a British stage actress. She is best known for playing captain Beverley Bass in Come from Away and Elphaba in Wicked in London's West End.

== Early life and education ==
Fearn was born in Bath, where she lived until age 4. Her family then moved to a small village in Cumbria called Caldbeck, where she lived until moving to London to study drama in 2002.

In Cumbria, she studied at Austin Friars School in Carlisle, her favourite subject being music. She played different instruments, settling on piano, harp and singing.

She trained at the Mountview Theatre School in London, graduating in 2005.

== Career ==
=== Stage ===
Fearn started her career onstage in 2004 as an understudy for the character of Laura in The Woman in White (Palace Theatre, London). After this, she understudied Cosette and Fantine in Les Misérables (Queen's Theatre, London), as well as playing one of the Factory Girls.

Fearn performed as Rapunzel in the version of Into the Woods at Regent's Park Open Air Theatre in London for the summer season of 2010, alongside Hannah Waddingham (Witch), Michael Xavier (Big Bad Wolf / Cinderella's Prince), Jenna Russell (Baker's Wife), Helen Dallimore (Cinderella) and Beverly Rudd (Little Red Riding Hood).

She was part of the original UK cast of Shrek The Musical in 2011 in the role of Gingy / Sugar Plum Fairy and understudying and playing the role of Princess Fiona in various performances.

In 2017, she made her debut in the musical Wicked as Elphaba opposite Sophie Evans as Glinda and stayed in the role until July 2019. Prior to this she was a standby for the role from September 2016 until July 2017.

Fearn has played the role of captain Beverley Bass in Come from Away, taking over from Rachel Tucker, at the Phoenix Theatre in London, until the show closed in January 2023. On 6 February 2023 she performed 'Me and the Sky' at Leicester's Curve Theatre to announce the launch of the UK tour of the show, starting from the venue on 1 March 2024.

On 16 April 2023, Fearn joined a star-studded cast for the concert version of Mad Hatter the Musical at the Place des Arts, Symphony Hall in Montreal in the role of Marybeth, the Mad Hatter's Wife. Fellow cast members included: Brittney Johnson, as the Queen of Hearts and Ra'ed Saade, Netflix star of My Unorthodox Life, as Barry.

She starred in the original musical Then, Now and Next at the Southwark Playhouse - Borough (London), directed by Julie Atherton and written by Christopher J Orton and Jon Robyns, from June until July 2023. The show follows Alex over the course of twenty years and through two loves, Stephen and Peter, played by Joaquin Pedro Valdes and Peter Hannah respectively.

In September 2023 it was announced that Fearn will join the cast of Diana the musical as Camilla Parker Bowles, alongside Kerry Ellis as Lady Di and Maiya Quensah Breed as young Diana Spencer. The UK premiere concert version of the show played at the Eventim Apollo in Hammersmith on 4 December 2023.

A new production of Dear Evan Hansen, co-produced by Ambassador Theatre Group Productions and Nottingham Playhouse was announced in 2024. The show would open in Nottingham ahead of a UK tour and open-call casting was launched in collaboration with TikTok. In June 2024 it was revealed that Fearn will be playing Heidi Hansen, Evan's mum.

In June 2026 full cast for the European premiere of Kimberly Akimbo was announced, with Fearn in the role of Debra, joining Maria Friedman in the titular role. The show ran at the Hampstead Theatre in London from August to November.

=== Films and television ===
Fearn has a long career as a singer/voice artists in major films, from movie musicals such as Sweeney Todd: the Demon Barber of Fleet Street, Mamma Mia!, Les Misérables, to Alice in Wonderland, How to train your dragon, Robin Hood and Life of Pi among many.

On 11 November 2024 it was announced that Fearn will be playing Galinda/Glinda's mother in the first of the two-part film adaptation of Wicked. Fearn joined many West End and Broadway stage actors making an appearance in the movie, such as Idina Menzel, Kristin Chenoweth, Andy Nyman, Adam James, Sharon D. Clarke, Debbie Kurup and Courtney-Mae Briggs. At the last stop of the movie premiere tour "Journey to Oz" in London, the city's Royal Festival Hall was transformed in the Emerald City with many of the movie stars and West End theatre and TV celebrities in attendance. Fearn made an appearance with Wicked co-star Sophie Evans, the two played Elphaba and Glinda respectively in the stage version of the show in London. Fearn also appears in the second movie adaptation Wicked: For Good, in a scene showing young Galinda's birthday party, as well as at Glinda and Fiyero's wedding.

=== Music ===
Fearn released the album Where I've Been...Where I'm Going in 2016.

Track list:

- Big Time
- What Are You Doing The Rest Of Your Life?
- Sorry I Asked
- Time Stops (feat. Oliver Tompsett)
- They Just Keep Moving The Line
- I'm A Woman (feat. Emma Lindars)
- I'm Here
- Being Alive
- Where Am I Going?
- That's How I Say Goodbye
- Bonus Track: She Used To Be Mine – Live at the St James Studio

On 30 September 2024 Fearn performed in a solo concert titled The Power of Love, at the London Palladium. The show was a tribute to Celine Dion, where Fearn performed some of the singer's greatest hits, such as All Coming Back to Me Now, My Heart Will Go On, The Power of Love and Because You Loved Me.

Fearn joined fellow West End performers for West End Does: Christmas in Oz in December 2024 at Cadogan Hall. Cast for the concert included: Oliver Tompsett, Louise Dearman, Sophie Evans, Claudia Kariuki and Liam Tamne and was hosted by Matt Lucas and Rob Houchen.

== Personal life ==
Fearn married fellow actor Gavin Alex Wood in 2019.

== Filmography ==
=== Film ===
Year	Title	Role	Notes
2007	Sweeney Todd: the Demon Barber of Fleet Street	Singer	Movie
2008	Mamma Mia!	Singer	Movie
2010	Alice in Wonderland	Singer	Movie
2010	How to Train Your Dragon	Singer	Movie
2010	Robin Hood	Singer	Movie
2011	Into the woods (Regent's Open Air Theatre)	Rapunzel	Musical, live recording
2012	Les Misérables	Factory Woman 6	Movie
2012	Frankenweenie	Singer	Movie
2012	Life of Pi	Singer	Movie
2014	How to Train Your Dragon 2	Singer	Movie
2015	Pan	Singer	Movie
2016	Kung Fu Panda 3	Singer	Movie
2020	Thomas and the Magic Railroad: 20th Anniversary Celebration	Storyteller (Adult Lily)	Video
2020	A Tale to Tell	Fairy Godmother	Short
2021	I Love You, You're Perfect, Now Change		Musical, live recording
2024	Kingdom of the Planet of the Apes	Singer	Movie
2024	Wicked	Galinda's momsie	Movie
2025	Wicked: For Good	Galinda's momsie	Movie

=== Television ===
Year	Title	Role	Notes
2009–2011	Tonight's the night (BBC)	Singer	She regularly appeared on the show
2016	EastEnders	Singer	TV series (1 episode). Performed "Being Alive"

=== Stage ===
Year	Title	Role	Theatre	Category	Ref.
2004	The Woman in White	Laura Fairlie (understudy)	Palace Theatre	West End	
2005	Les Misérables	Factory Girl / Fantine (understudy) / Cosette (understudy)	Queen's Theatre	West End	
2009	Annie Get Your Gun	Ensemble	Young Vic	Off West End	
2010	Into the Woods	Rapunzel	Regent's Park Open Air Theatre	Off West End	
2011	Shrek: the Musical	Gingy / Sugar Plum Fairy / Fiona (understudy)	Theatre Royal, Drury Lane	West End	
2014	Dirty Rotten Scoundrels	Muriel Eubanks (u/s), Christine Colgate (u/s)	Savoy Theatre	West End	
2016–2017	Wicked	Standby Elphaba	Apollo Victoria Theatre	West End	
2017–2019	Wicked	Elphaba	Apollo Victoria Theatre	West End	
2020–2023	Come From Away	Beverley Bass	Phoenix Theatre	West End	
2022	Footballers' Wives The Musical	Tanya Turner	Streaming only	Streaming only	
2023	Mad Hatter the Musical	Marybeth, the Mad Hatter's Wife	Place des Arts, Montreal		
2023	Then, Now and Next	Alex Shaw	Southwark Playhouse (Borough)	Off West End	
2023	Diana the Musical	Camilla Parker Bowles	Eventim Apollo	Off West End	
2024–2025	Dear Evan Hansen	Heidi Hansen	Nottingham Playhouse and UK Tour	Regional and UK tour	
2026	Kimberly Akimbo	Debra	Hampstead Theatre	London	

== Awards ==
Fearn won the West End Wilma Award for Best Understudy as Elphaba in Wicked in 2017.
