= Sing to Me Instead Tour =

2019 concert tour by Ben Platt

- Tour by Ben Platt
- Location: North America
- Associated album: Sing to Me Instead
- Start date: May 3, 2019
- End date: September 29, 2019
- Legs: 1
- No. of shows: 14

Ben Platt concert chronology
- Sing to Me Instead Tour; Reverie Tour (2022)

The Sing to Me Instead Tour was the debut concert tour from American actor/singer-songwriter Ben Platt, in support of his debut solo album, Sing to Me Instead.

== Background ==
On February 11, 2019, Platt confirmed he would embark on his debut solo concert tour in promotion for his new album. His shows included telling personal stories about his life and how he became who he is today, using his music from the album and a few covers of popular tunes to weave it all together. The tour featured opening acts Ben Abraham and Wrabel, who co-write songs on Sing to Me Instead, and ended on September 29, 2019, at Radio City Music Hall in New York City.

== Tour dates ==
Date	City	Country	Venue
North America
May 3, 2019	Chicago	United States	Chicago Theatre
May 4, 2019	Detroit	United States	Fisher Theatre
May 6, 2019	Toronto	Canada	Sony Centre for the Performing Arts
May 8, 2019	Boston	United States	Wang Theatre
May 11, 2019	Washington, D.C.	United States	The Anthem
May 12, 2019	Philadelphia	United States	The Met Philadelphia
May 14, 2019	New York City	United States	Beacon Theatre
May 16, 2019	Atlanta	United States	Cobb Energy Performing Arts Centre
May 18, 2019	Austin	United States	ACL Live at the Moody Theatre
May 19, 2019	Irving	United States	Toyota Music Factory
May 22, 2019	San Francisco	United States	SF Masonic Auditorium
May 24, 2019	Los Angeles	United States	Dolby Theatre
Europe
June 15, 2019	London	United Kingdom	Eventim Apollo
North America
September 29, 2019	New York City	United States	Radio City Music Hall

== Concert film ==
On September 9, 2019, it was announced in advance of Platt's concert at Radio City that it would be filmed as a TV special for Netflix. Alex Timbers and Sam Wrench served as directors, and Platt, Timbers, Adam Mersel, Heather Reynolds and Fulwell 73's Ben Winston and Lee Lodge served as executive producers. This was also done to help build anticipation for the premiere of the web television series, The Politician, which Platt also starred in. The concert special, entitled Ben Platt Live from Radio City Music Hall, was completed months later and was released on Netflix on May 20, 2020.

== Set list ==
1. "Bad Habit"
2. "Temporary Love"
3. "Honest Man"
4. "Hurt Me Once"
5. "New"
6. "The Joke" (Brandi Carlile cover)
7. "Better"
8. "Share Your Address"
9. "Ease My Mind"
10. "Rain"
11. "Overjoyed" (Stevie Wonder cover)
12. "In Case You Don't Live Forever"
13. "Take Me to the Pilot" (Elton John cover)
14. "Grow As We Go"
15. "Older"
16. "Run Away"

== Musicians ==
- Crystal Monee Hall - background vocals
- Kojo Littles - background vocals
- Allen René Louis - background vocals
- Mike Ricchiuti - piano, keyboards
- Nir Felder - guitars
- Justin Goldner - guitars
- Amanda Lo - violin
- Reenat Pinchas – cello
- Julia Adamy - bass
- Derrick Wright - drums
- David Cook - musical director, piano (London, Radio City)

== Reception ==
Caroline Cronin of BroadwayWorld wrote, "Interspersing each performance with personal anecdotes, Platt appears quietly confident owning a stage as a solo artist. His joyful performances of each track were complemented by a series of very honest, heartfelt stories about his life, ranging from relationships and his coming out journey to his struggles with anxiety. Earnest without being saccharine, Platt is a naturally endearing presence, and it's clear why he's become the breakout star that he has."
