= Ben Platt =

American actor and singer (born 1993)

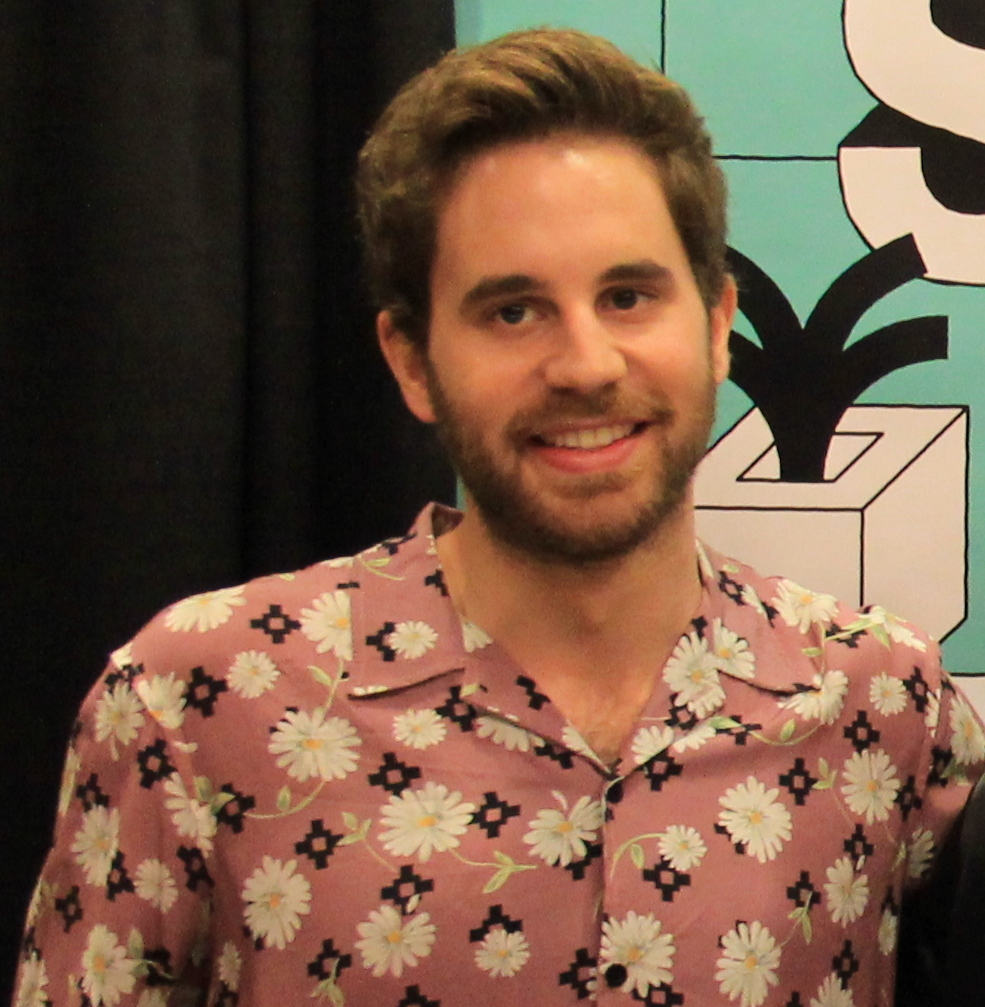
- Platt in 2019
- Born: Benjamin Schiff Platt; September 24, 1993 (age 33); Los Angeles, California, U.S.
- Education: Columbia University
- Occupations: Actor; singer; songwriter
- Years active: 2002–present
- Spouse: Noah Galvin (m. 2024)
- Parents: Marc Platt (father); Julie Platt (mother)
- Relatives: Jonah Platt (brother)
- Musical career
- Genres: Broadway; pop; folk
- Instruments: Vocals; piano
- Labels: Atlantic; Interscope
- Website: benplattmusic.com

Benjamin Schiff Platt (born September 24, 1993) is an American actor and singer. The son of film and theater producer Marc Platt and philanthropist Julie Platt, he began his acting career in musical theater as a child and appeared in productions of The Sound of Music (2006) and The Book of Mormon (2012–2015), rising to prominence for originating the title role in the Broadway coming-of-age musical Dear Evan Hansen (2015–2017). His performance in the latter earned him multiple accolades, including the Tony Award for Best Leading Actor in a Musical (making him the youngest solo recipient of the award at the time), a Daytime Emmy, and a Grammy Award. Platt reprised the role of Evan Hansen in the 2021 film adaptation of the musical, produced by his father. His portrayal of Leo Frank in the 2023 Broadway revival of Parade earned him nominations for a Tony and a Grammy.

Platt's film credits include the Pitch Perfect film series (2012–2017), Ricki and the Flash (2015), Run This Town (2019), and Theater Camp (2023), the latter of which he also co-wrote. Since 2019, he has starred in the Netflix comedy-drama series The Politician, for which he was nominated for a Golden Globe Award.

Platt signed with Atlantic Records in 2017 and released his debut studio album Sing to Me Instead in March 2019. In May 2020, the concert film Ben Platt Live from Radio City Music Hall debuted on Netflix. Platt's second studio album Reverie was released on August 13, 2021. After signing with Interscope in 2023, Platt's third studio album Honeymind was released on May 31, 2024.

In 2017, Platt was included on the annual Time 100 list of the most influential people in the world.

== Early life ==
Platt was born in Los Angeles, the fourth of five children of Julie and Marc Platt. His father is a film, television, and theater producer whose credits include Legally Blonde, Into the Woods, La La Land, Mary Poppins Returns, the musical Wicked, and its film adaptation. His mother has served as chair of the Board of Trustees of the Jewish Federations of North America, which oversees 146 Jewish Federations across the United States and Canada. He has two sisters and two brothers, including actor Jonah Platt. He and his family are Jewish.

He attended the Adderley School for Performing Arts in Pacific Palisades, performing in productions like Bye Bye Birdie and Into the Woods. Platt attended Harvard-Westlake School in Los Angeles, graduating in 2011. He then enrolled at Columbia University in New York but dropped out after seven weeks to fulfill his contract with The Book of Mormon. During his time at Columbia, he was a member of the campus a cappella musical group Nonsequitur.

== Career ==
=== 2002–2014: Early stage and The Book of Mormon ===
At 9 years old, Platt played Winthrop Paroo in The Music Man at the Hollywood Bowl alongside Kristin Chenoweth. At 11, he appeared in a brief national tour of Caroline, or Change, by Jeanine Tesori and Tony Kushner. At 17, he played Jean Valjean in Kidz Theater's production of Les Misérables. His other early roles include the role of Claude Bukowski in Columbia University's production of Hair: The American Tribal Love-Rock Musical. He has also collaborated on a workshop of Alice by Heart, by Duncan Sheik and Steven Sater, a new take on Alice's Adventures in Wonderland.

In 2012, Platt was cast as Elder Arnold Cunningham in the Chicago production of The Book of Mormon. The show premiered at the Bank of America Theatre on December 19, 2012, after a week of previews. The production was well received and closed on October 6, 2013. Critics lauded Platt's performance, calling him a "true revelation in this brand new Chicago production... He really leans into this part, throwing himself out there with the abandonment of youth". Platt later reprised his role as Elder Cunningham on Broadway at the Eugene O'Neill Theatre from January 7, 2014, to January 6, 2015.

=== 2015–2017: Film work and Dear Evan Hansen ===
In 2012, Platt had a supporting role in the musical comedy Pitch Perfect, loosely based on the non-fiction book Pitch Perfect: The Quest for Collegiate A Cappella Glory. Platt played the magic-loving Benji Applebaum, alongside an ensemble cast including Anna Kendrick, Skylar Astin, Rebel Wilson, Adam DeVine, Anna Camp, and Brittany Snow. The film emerged as a major commercial success and received mostly positive reviews from critics. He was subsequently nominated at the 2013 Teen Choice Awards in the Choice Movie Scene Stealer category for his work. In 2015, Platt reprised his role as Benji Applebaum in the sequel, Pitch Perfect 2, followed by appearances in the films Ricki and the Flash and Billy Lynn's Long Halftime Walk.

Platt became attached to Steven Levenson and Pasek and Paul's then Untitled P&P Project in 2014, participating in early read-throughs and workshops. By 2015, the musical, titled Dear Evan Hansen, had begun production in Washington, D.C. at the Arena Stage with Platt originating the title role. The show premiered on July 9, 2015, and it closed on August 23, 2015. The overwhelming positive reception toward the production and Platt's performance resulted in the show being transferred to Off-Broadway.

In 2016, Platt once again originated the role of Evan Hansen at Second Stage Theatre. Platt and the cast played a month of previews, beginning on March 26, 2016, before premiering on May 1, 2016. The limited engagement sold out its entire run with Platt playing his last performance on May 26, 2016.

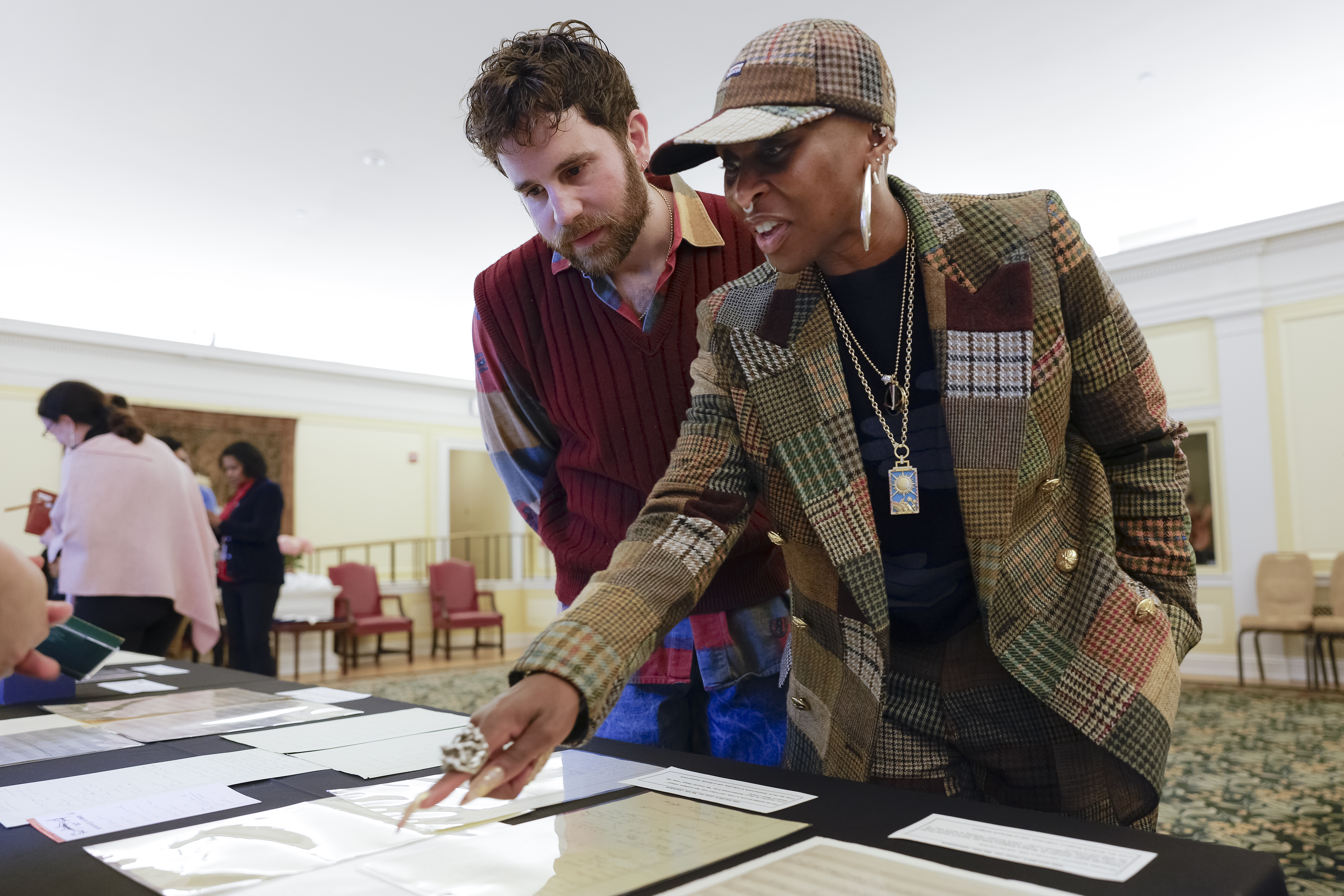
Ben Platt and Cynthia Erivo look over a special collections display during a tour of the Library of Congress in 2023.

In December 2016, Platt originated the title role in Dear Evan Hansen on Broadway at the Music Box Theatre. Critics hailed his work, calling it "historic" and "one of the greatest leading male performances [I've] ever seen in a musical". For his performance, Platt won numerous awards, including the Tony Award for Best Actor in a Leading Role in a Musical. At age 23, Platt was the youngest solo recipient of the Tony Award in the category until Myles Frost won the award in 2022. Platt played his final performance on November 19, 2017.

=== 2017–2020: Debut album and The Politician ===
In 2017, Platt signed a record deal with Atlantic Records. On January 28, 2018, he performed Leonard Bernstein's "Somewhere" live at the 60th Annual Grammy Awards accompanied by Justin Goldner and Adele Stein and arranged by Alex Lacamoire.

On March 19, 2018, Platt and Hamilton creator Lin-Manuel Miranda released "Found/Tonight", a mashup of the Hamilton song "The Story of Tonight" and the Dear Evan Hansen song "You Will Be Found". Platt donated a portion of the proceeds to support the March for Our Lives anti-gun-violence initiative, and also performed on stage with Miranda at the rally in Washington, D.C., on March 24, 2018. Platt starred opposite Damian Lewis, Nina Dobrev, and Mena Massoud in the Rob Ford historical fiction thriller Run This Town. The casting of Platt caused minor controversy, over allegations that the filmmakers were appropriating the story of female reporter Robyn Doolittle. On March 1, 2018, Platt was confirmed to star in the indie drama Broken Diamonds opposite Lola Kirke, Yvette Nicole Brown, Alphonso McAuley, and Lynda Boyd. The film premiered at the Santa Barbara International Film Festival on April 1, 2021, and was released in the United States on July 23, 2021.

In January 2019, Platt announced that his debut studio album, Sing to Me Instead was scheduled for release on March 29, 2019. It was made available for pre-order, along with the songs "Bad Habit" and "Ease My Mind" a few days later. Following the release of his debut album, Platt embarked on his first North American tour in May 2019. The tour ended on September 29, 2019, at Radio City Music Hall in New York City, in which the concert there was taped for release on Netflix. Platt released a new single "Rain" on August 23, 2019, followed by a music video on September 10, 2019. On April 21, 2020, Platt revealed on Instagram that the taping of his Radio City concert, in the form of a TV special entitled Ben Platt Live from Radio City Music Hall, would be released on Netflix on May 20, 2020.

On August 29, 2019, it was announced that Platt would be starring in Richard Linklater's film adaptation of Merrily We Roll Along alongside Beanie Feldstein and Blake Jenner. The project is set to be shot over the course of twenty years, with principal photography of the first sequence of the film having already been completed prior to the announcement. On January 10, 2023, it was announced that Jenner would be replaced by Paul Mescal.

Platt starred as Payton Hobart on the Netflix comedy-drama series The Politician, which tells the story of a very driven teen convinced that he's destined to become President of the United States. Platt's casting was announced in March 2018, and the series premiered on September 27, 2019. He received a Golden Globe Award nomination for Best Actor – Television Series Musical or Comedy for his performance in the series' first season.

Platt released a new single, "So Will I", on May 8, 2020. On May 20, 2020, Platt released Sing to Me Instead (Deluxe), which includes "So Will I", "Rain", and six songs recorded live at Radio City Music Hall, including cover versions of Brandi Carlile's "The Joke" and Elton John's "Take Me to the Pilot". On June 8, 2020, Platt released "Everything I Did to Get to You", a new single written by David Davis, which he picked as the winner of his episode of NBC's songwriting competition show Songland.

=== 2021–present: Reverie, Parade and other projects ===
In April 2021, Platt teased the chorus of his new single, "Imagine", on TikTok. The complete song was released on April 23, 2021, followed by a remix by Dutch electronic producer Tiësto on May 28, 2021. In July, he announced on Twitter that his second studio album, Reverie, for which "Imagine" was released as its first single, would be released on August 13, 2021. The second single, "Happy to Be Sad", was released on July 16, 2021. The Reverie tour was announced on August 13, 2021, spanning 27 stops in North America beginning February 23, 2022, and concluding at the Hollywood Bowl on April 8, 2022. The tour was later postponed due to the COVID pandemic and rescheduled to begin on September 3, 2022, in Seattle, Washington before concluding in Hollywood, Florida on October 7, 2022, for a total of 20 stops.

On June 25, 2021, Platt released a cover version of the song "Yoü and I" by Lady Gaga, as part of the tenth anniversary of the Born This Way album.

On November 29, 2018, it was announced that Universal Pictures and Platt's father, Marc Platt, secured the film rights to Dear Evan Hansen. On June 18, 2020, Platt confirmed that he was set to reprise his role as Evan Hansen in the film, which would be directed by Stephen Chbosky from a screenplay by Levenson. It premiered as the Opening Night Gala Presentation of the 2021 Toronto International Film Festival on September 9, 2021, followed by a release in theaters on September 24, 2021, in time for Platt's 28th birthday. Upon the release of the film's first trailer on May 18, 2021, the casting of Platt as Evan Hansen and the appearance of the film's version of the character received substantial criticism, with viewers commenting that he, at age 27, was too old to play a high schooler. Platt, however, dismissed the response, comparing his age to those of actors who played high school students in the 1978 film Grease. The criticism against the casting went even further, with emerging claims that nepotism was involved in the decision. On August 8, 2021, in an interview with Zach Sang on his YouTube talk show, Platt said, "I think the reaction is largely from people who don't understand the context of the piece—the fact that I created the role and workshopped it for three years ... Were I not to do the movie, it probably wouldn't get made. And so, I think, my defensive response is to want to go onto Twitter and be like, 'F you, guys. You don't even know that this wouldn't exist without me.' Of course, that's not true entirely and not my place to say. All I have to do is let the work speak for itself."

On March 2, 2021, it was announced that Platt was in talks to star in the film adaptation of Grant Ginder's novel The People We Hate at the Wedding. His casting was announced on July 8, 2021, along with Amazon Studios being confirmed to produce the film. The film began production in September 2021 and was released worldwide on streaming platform Amazon Prime Video on November 18, 2022 .

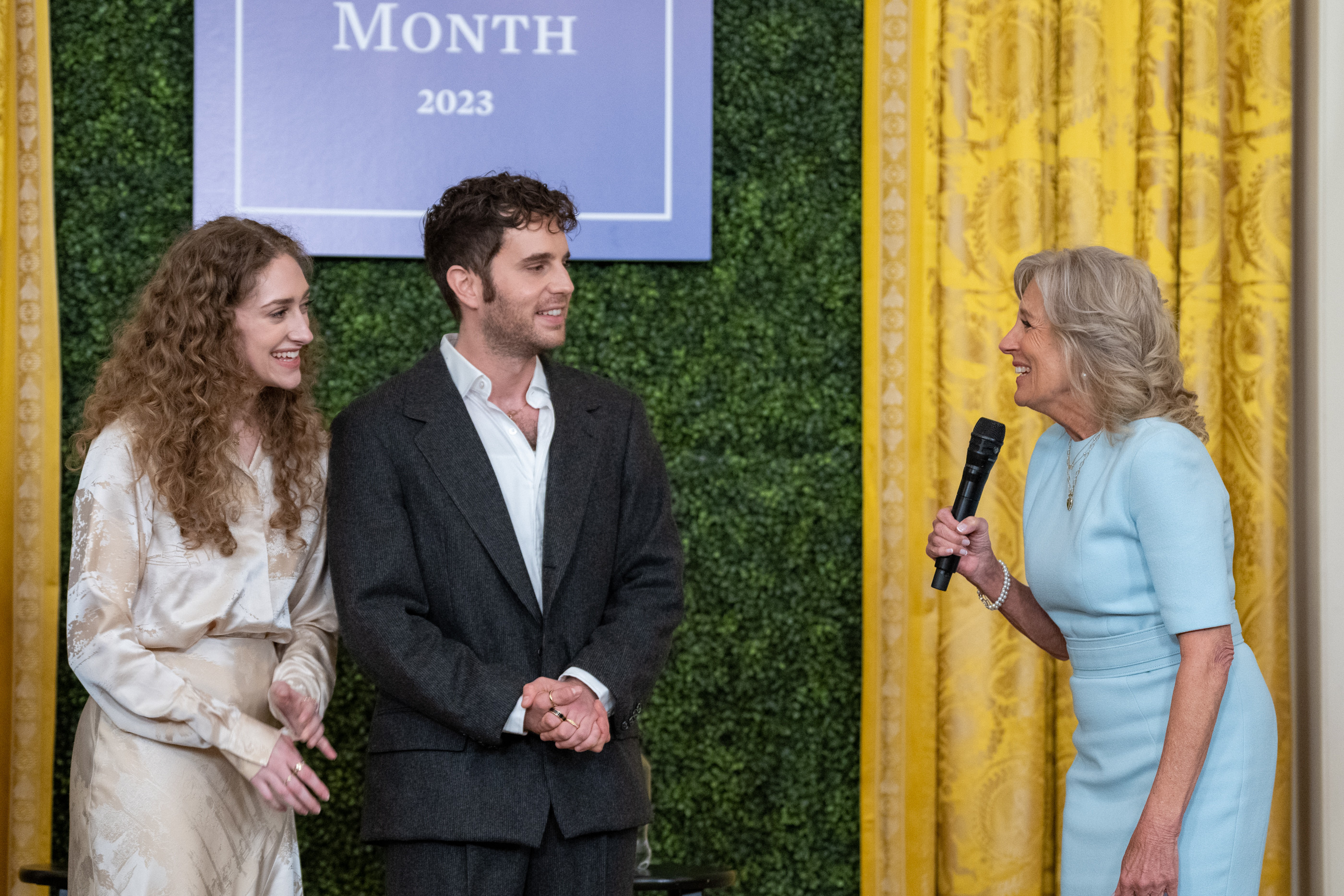
Platt and Micaela Diamond with First Lady Jill Biden during a Jewish American Heritage Month reception at the White House in 2023.

On May 17, 2022, it was announced that Platt would play Leo Frank in the New York City Center production of Parade as the gala production of its 2022/2023 season after playing the role in a workshop conducted by Roundabout Theatre Company in 2018. Performances ran from November 1 to 6, 2022, and critics responded positively to Platt's return to the theatre stage. A limited Broadway run was announced on January 10, 2023, with Platt continuing his role as Leo Frank. The revival began previews on February 22, 2023, and opened on March 16, 2023, at the Bernard B. Jacobs Theatre. The limited run concluded on August 6, 2023. High demand for tickets on the first day of sale resulted in temporarily crashing the Telecharge ticket site, resulting in error messages and queues of an hour long. On the night of the show's first preview, members of the neo-Nazi group National Socialist Movement protested against the production outside the theater. The cast album for the production was released by Interscope Records on March 23, 2023. For his performance as Leo Frank, Platt received his second Tony nomination for Best Actor in a Leading Role in a Musical.

On June 9, 2022, it was announced that Platt would produce and star in the musical comedy film Theater Camp, inspired by the 2020 short film of the same name he co-wrote with Noah Galvin, Molly Gordon, and Nick Lieberman. The film had its world premiere at the 2023 Sundance Film Festival on January 21, 2023, and was acquired shortly after by Searchlight Pictures for a theatrical release beginning July 14, 2023. The movie soundtrack featuring original songs written by Platt, Galvin, Gordon, and Lieberman was released on the same day by Interscope Records. The film was released on streaming service Hulu and VOD on September 14, 2023.

On August 31, 2022, before kicking off the Reverie Tour, Platt confirmed that he was working on new solo music and was a third of the way through completing his next album. On May 11, 2023, Platt signed with Interscope Records for his future music releases and to operate an imprint for which he will sign and develop talent. On March 12, 2024, Platt announced that his third album Honeymind would be released on May 31, 2024, with the first single "Andrew" released on March 14, 2024. On March 18, 2024, it was announced that Platt would hold a three-week residency at the Palace Theatre, the first announced event at the theater since its renovations began in 2018. The residency ran for 18 performances between May 28, 2024, and June 15, 2024, and included special guests Kacey Musgraves, Kristin Chenoweth, Alex Newell, Kristen Bell, Meghan Trainor, Cynthia Erivo, Laura Dreyfuss, Micaela Diamond, Gaten Matarazzo and Brian d'Arcy James. On April 11, 2024, the second single "Cherry on Top" was released alongside the announcement of The Honeymind Tour, a 21-city North American tour that began on June 18, 2024, in Boston and concluded July 27, 2024, in Seattle.

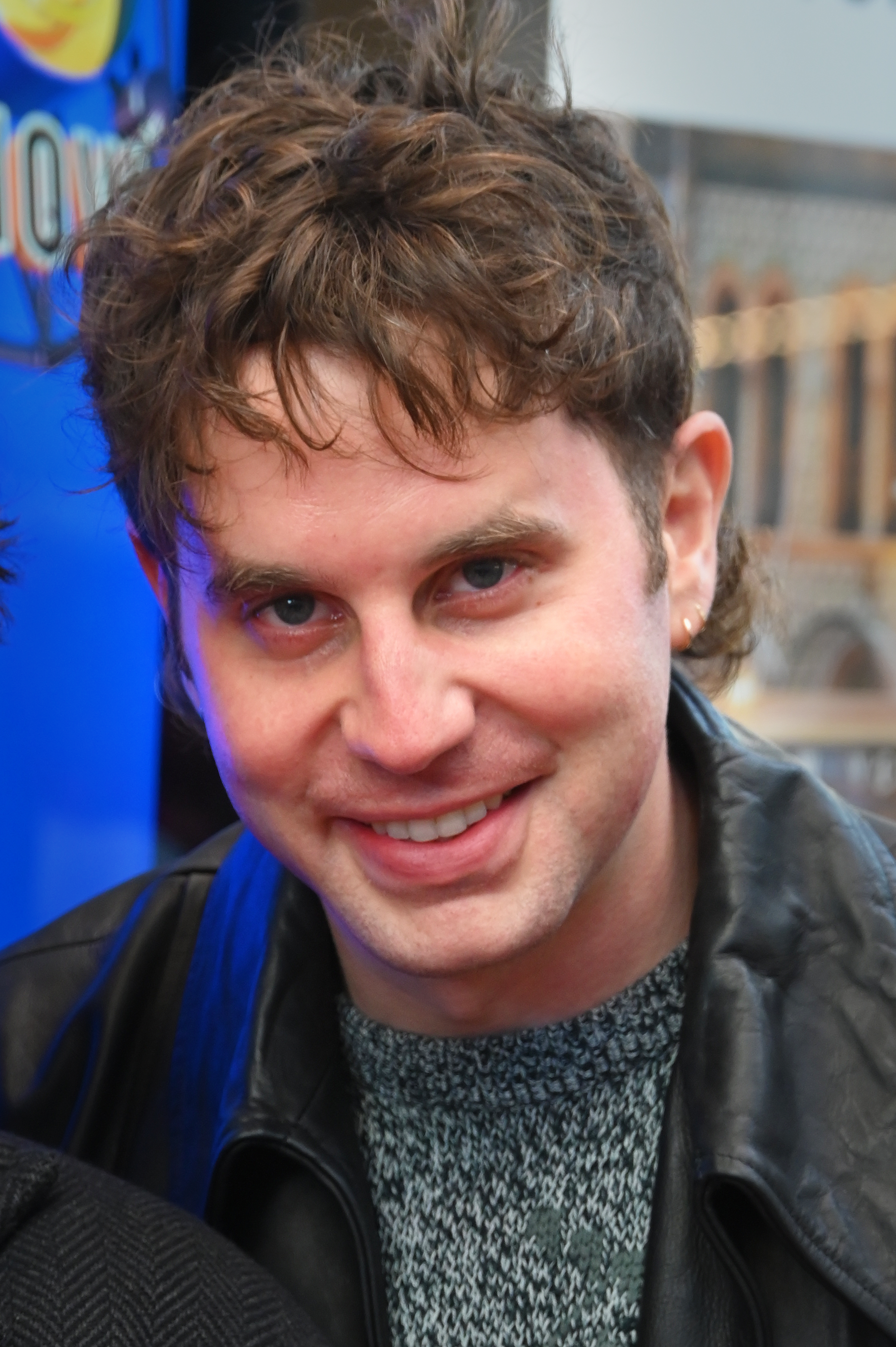
Platt in 2025

On August 10, 2025, Platt released a streaming version of Addison Rae's song "Diet Pepsi" after performing it at the 2025 Las Culturista Culture Awards.

On October 17, 2025, Platt announced a two-week, 10 performance residency at L.A.'s Ahmanson Theatre scheduled for December 12–21, 2025.

In January 2026, Platt guest starred in two episodes of Ryan Murphy's The Beauty on FX.

Platt made his West End debut in a concert production of The Last Five Years at the London Palladium, alongside Rachel Zegler, to celebrate the show's 25th anniversary. The limited one-week engagement ran from March 24 to March 29, 2026. It was then announced on February 3, 2026, that the concert production would also be held at the Hollywood Bowl on April 3, 2026, and at Radio City Music Hall on April 6 and 7, 2026. An official live recording titled The Last Five Years (25th Anniversary Live at the London Palladium) with Platt and Zegler was released via Atlantic Records on April 20, 2026.

On February 9, 2026, Platt announced he would star in the Off-West End production of Midnight at the Never Get at the Menier Chocolate Factory. Previews began on July 11, with opening night on July 20. The limited run closed on September 12, 2026.

== Personal life ==
Platt is gay. He told his family when he was twelve years old, and publicly came out in 2019. On January 12, 2020, Platt began a relationship with Noah Galvin (whom he first met in 2015 and who succeeded Platt in the title role in Dear Evan Hansen in 2017). They announced their engagement on November 25, 2022, and were married over the Labor Day weekend on September 1, 2024.

In April 2025, Platt publicly expressed support for fellow actor Hannah Einbinder's speech at the Human Rights Campaign's Visibility Award when she condemned Israel's actions in Gaza. He also stated that his Jewish identity is not defined by Israel. Platt voted for Zohran Mamdani in the 2025 New York City Democratic mayoral primary.

== Acting credits ==
=== Theater ===
Year	Production	Role	Venue	Notes
2002	The Music Man	Winthrop Paroo	Hollywood Bowl	Los Angeles
2004	Mame	Patrick Denis	Hollywood Bowl	Los Angeles
2004	Caroline, or Change	Noah Gellman	Ahmanson Theatre	National Tour
2005	Camelot	Tom of Warwick	Hollywood Bowl	Los Angeles
2005	Dead End	Philip Griswald	Ahmanson Theatre	Regional
2006	The Sound of Music	Friedrich von Trapp	Hollywood Bowl	Los Angeles
2012	The Power of Duff	Ricky Duff	Powerhouse Theatre	Regional
2012	The Black Suits	Chris Thurser	Barrington Stage Company	Regional
2012–13	The Book of Mormon	Elder Arnold Cunningham	CIBC Theatre	Chicago
2014–15	The Book of Mormon	Elder Arnold Cunningham	Eugene O'Neill Theatre	Broadway
2015	Dear Evan Hansen	Evan Hansen	Arena Stage	Washington, D.C.
2015	Alice by Heart	White Rabbit / Alfred Hallam / March Hare	MCC Theater	Workshop
2016	The Secret Garden	Dickon Sowerby	David Geffen Hall	25th Anniversary Concert
2016	Dear Evan Hansen	Evan Hansen	Second Stage Theatre	Off-Broadway
2016–17	Dear Evan Hansen	Evan Hansen	Music Box Theatre	Broadway
2018	Parade	Leo Frank	Roundabout Theatre Company	Workshop
2022	Parade	Leo Frank	New York City Center	Off-Broadway
2023	Parade	Leo Frank	Bernard B. Jacobs Theatre	Broadway
2023	Gutenberg! The Musical!	The Producer (One night only)	James Earl Jones Theatre	Broadway
2025	Trisha Paytas' Big Broadway Dream! (One night only)	Himself	St. James Theatre	Broadway
2026	The Last Five Years	Jamie Wellerstein	London Palladium	West End
2026	The Last Five Years	Jamie Wellerstein	Hollywood Bowl	25th Anniversary Concert
2026	The Last Five Years	Jamie Wellerstein	Radio City Music Hall	25th Anniversary Concert
2026	Midnight at the Never Get	Trevor Copeland	Menier Chocolate Factory	Off-West End

=== Film ===
Year	Title	Role	Notes
2006	Red Riding Hood	Boy Scout No. 1	
2012	Pitch Perfect	Benji Applebaum	
2015	Pitch Perfect 2	Benji Applebaum	
2015	Ricki and the Flash	Daniel	
2016	Billy Lynn's Long Halftime Walk	Josh	
2017	The Female Brain	Joel	
2019	Run This Town	Bram Shriver	
2019	Drunk Parents	Jason Johnson	
2020	Ben Platt Live from Radio City Music Hall	Himself	Also executive producer
2020	Theater Camp	Angelo Bassett	Short film; also writer and producer
2020	Father of the Bride, Part 3(ish)	George "Georgie" Banks-MacKenzie	Short film
2021	Broken Diamonds	Scott	
2021	Dear Evan Hansen	Evan Hansen	
2022	The People We Hate at the Wedding	Paul	
2023	Theater Camp	Amos Klobuchar	Also writer and producer
2024	Chow	Mike	Short film
TBA	The Technique	TBA	Filming
TBA	Merrily We Roll Along	Charley Kringas	Filming

=== Television ===
Year	Title	Role	Notes
2017	Will & Grace	Blake	Episode: "Who's Your Daddy"
2019–20	The Politician	Payton Hobart	Lead role (15 episodes); also executive producer
2020	Songland	Himself	Episode: "Ben Platt"
2020	Graduate Together: America Honors the High School Class of 2020	Himself	Television special
2020	The Simpsons	Blake (voice)	Episode: "Three Dreams Denied"
2020	The Disney Family Singalong: Volume II	Himself	Television special
2021	Big Brother 23	Himself	Episode: "Episode 24"
2021	The Premise	Ethan Streiber	Episode: "Social Justice Sex Tape"
2022	RuPaul's Drag Race All Stars	Himself	Guest judge; Season 7 Episode: "Dance Like Drag Queen"
2023	The Other Two	Himself	Episode: "Brooke Hosts a Night of Undeniable Good"
2023	Teenage Euthanasia	Phineas (voice)	Episode: "Sexually Educated"
2026	The Beauty	Manny	Episodes: "Beautiful Christopher Cross" & "Beautiful Chimp Face"
TBA	Industry	Matt Crenshaw	

== Discography ==
=== Studio albums ===
Title	Details	Peak chart positions				
Title	Details	US	AUS	BEL (FL)	CAN	UK
Sing to Me Instead	Release date: March 29, 2019; Label: Atlantic; Formats: CD, LP, digital download, streaming	18	32	—	57	79
Reverie	Release date: August 13, 2021; Label: Atlantic; Formats: CD, LP, digital download, streaming	84	67	160	—	— (Note: Reverie did not enter the UK Albums Chart, but peaked at number 32 on the UK Albums Sales Chart.)
Honeymind	Release date: May 31, 2024; Label: Interscope; Formats: CD, LP, digital download, streaming	—	—	—	—	—
"—" denotes a recording that did not chart or was not released.

=== Soundtrack and cast albums ===
Title	Details	Peak chart positions				
Title	Details	US	US Cast	US OST	AUS	CAN
Dear Evan Hansen (Original Broadway Cast Recording)	Release date: February 3, 2017; Label: Atlantic; Formats: CD, LP, digital download, streaming	8	1	—	34	58
The Politician (Music from the Netflix Original Series)	Release date: October 22, 2019; Label: Atlantic; Formats: Digital download, streaming	— (Note: "The Politician" did not enter the Billboard 200 but charted at number 18 on the Digital Albums chart and number 89 on the Top Album Sales chart.)	—	20	—	—
Dear Evan Hansen (Original Motion Picture Soundtrack)	Release date: September 24, 2021; Label: Interscope; Formats: Digital download, streaming	—	—	—	—	—
Parade (2023 Broadway Cast Recording)	Release date: March 23, 2023; Label: Interscope; Formats: Digital download, streaming	—	—	—	—	—
The Last Five Years (25th Anniversary Live at the London Palladium)	Release date: April 20, 2026; Label: Atlantic; Formats: Digital download, streaming	—	—	—	—	—
"—" denotes a recording that did not chart or was not released.

=== Singles ===
Title	Year	Peak chart positions					Certifications	Album
Title	Year	US	US Adult Pop	US Dance	CAN Dig.	NZ Hot	Certifications	Album
"Waving Through a Window"	2017	—	—	1	—	—	RIAA: Platinum; BPI: Gold	Dear Evan Hansen (Original Broadway Cast Recording)
"Found/Tonight" (with Lin-Manuel Miranda)	2018	49	—	—	19	—		Non-album single
"Bad Habit"	2019	—	—	—	—	—		Sing to Me Instead
"Grow as We Go"	2019	—	—	—	—	—	RIAA: Gold	Sing to Me Instead
"Rain" (Note: "Rain" was included on the deluxe edition of Sing to Me Instead.)	2019	—	—	—	—	—		Sing to Me Instead
"So Will I" (Note: "So Will I" was included on the deluxe edition of Sing to Me Instead.)	2020	— (Note: "So Will I" did not enter the Billboard Hot 100, but did peak at number 47 on the Digital Song Sales chart.)	—	—	—	—		Sing to Me Instead
"Everything I Did to Get to You" (from Songland)	2020	— (Note: "Everything I Did to Get to You" did not enter the Billboard Hot 100, but did peak at number 34 on the Digital Song Sales chart.)	—	—	—	—		Non-album single
"Imagine" (original or Tiësto remix)	2021	—	27	—	48	33		Reverie
"Happy to Be Sad"	2021	—	—	—	—	—		Reverie
"Andrew"	2024	—	—	—	—	—		Honeymind
"Cherry on Top"	2024	—	—	—	—	—		Honeymind
"Treehouse" (featuring Brandy Clark)	2024	—	—	—	—	—		Honeymind
"Diet Pepsi"	2025	—	—	—	—	37		Non-album single
"—" denotes a recording that did not chart or was not released.

=== Promotional singles ===
Title	Year	Album
"Ease My Mind"	2019	Sing to Me Instead
"Temporary Love"	2019	Sing to Me Instead
"Yoü and I"	2021	Born This Way The Tenth Anniversary
"Waving Through a Window"	2021	Dear Evan Hansen (Original Motion Picture Soundtrack)
"You Will Be Found" (with Amandla Stenberg, Liz Kate, DeMarius Copes, Isaac Powell, Hadiya Eshé, Kaitlyn Dever and Dear Evan Hansen Choir)	2021	Dear Evan Hansen (Original Motion Picture Soundtrack)
"Only Us" (with Kaitlyn Dever)	2021	Dear Evan Hansen (Original Motion Picture Soundtrack)
"Sincerely, Me" (with Colton Ryan and Nik Dodani)	2021	Dear Evan Hansen (Original Motion Picture Soundtrack)
"This Is Not Over Yet" (with Micaela Diamond)	2023	Parade

=== Other charted and certified songs ===
Title	Year	Peak chart positions	Certification	Album
Title	Year	US Holiday Digital	Certification	Album
"You Will Be Found"	2017	—	RIAA: Gold; BPI: Silver	Dear Evan Hansen (Original Broadway Cast Recording)
"Sincerely, Me"	2017	—	RIAA: Gold	Dear Evan Hansen (Original Broadway Cast Recording)
"River"	2019	24		The Politician (Music from the Netflix Original Series)
"—" denotes a recording that did not chart or was not released.

== Tours and residency ==
Headlining tours

- Sing to Me Instead Tour (2019)
- Reverie Tour (2022)
- Honeymind Tour (2024)

Residency

- Ben Platt: Live at the Palace (2024)
- Ben Platt: Live at the Ahmanson (2025)

== Awards and nominations ==
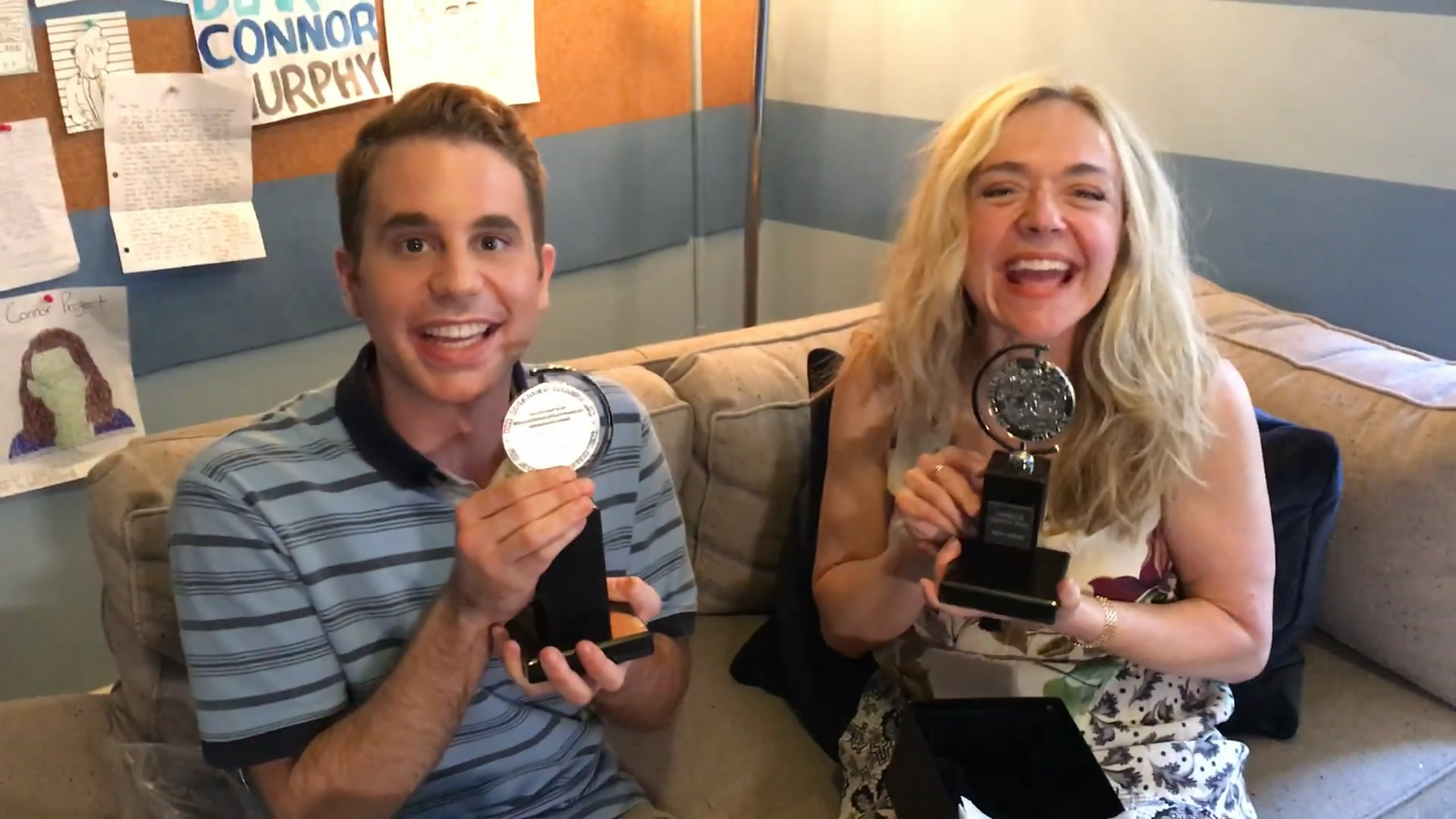
Platt and fellow Dear Evan Hansen cast member Rachel Bay Jones with their Tony Awards

Platt was nominated for an Outer Critics Circle Award, a Drama League Distinguished Performance Award, and won the Obie Award for Distinguished Performance by an Actor and Lucille Lortel Award for Outstanding Lead Actor in a Musical for Dear Evan Hansen's Off-Broadway run in 2016.

On May 19, 2017, at the 83rd annual Drama League Awards, it was announced that Platt had won the organization's Distinguished Performance Award. This award, which recognizes a performance on the New York stage in the past year, can only be won once in a performer's career. In winning at the age of 23 for his work in Dear Evan Hansen, Platt became the youngest winner in the award's history. Platt earned a Daytime Emmy Award, a Grammy Award, and a Tony Award for his performance in Dear Evan Hansen. On June 11, at the 71st Tony Awards, 23-year-old Platt won the Tony Award for Best Leading Actor in a Musical, at the time becoming the youngest actor to win this award solo. Platt reprised the role in the 2021 film adaptation earning a nomination for the Golden Raspberry Award for Worst Actor of the year.

Platt received a Golden Globe Award nomination for his role in the Netflix series The Politician in 2020. At the 76th Tony Awards, Platt received his second Tony Award for Best Leading Actor in a Musical nomination for his portrayal of Leo Frank in the 2023 musical revival of Parade.

Year	Awards	Category	Work	Result	Ref.
2013	Teen Choice Awards	Choice Movie: Male Scene Stealer	Pitch Perfect	Nominated	
2016	Drama League Awards	Distinguished Performance	Dear Evan Hansen	Nominated	
2016	Outer Critics Circle Awards	Best Leading Actor in a Musical	Dear Evan Hansen	Nominated	
2016	Obie Awards	Distinguished Performance by an Actor	Dear Evan Hansen	Won	
2017	Tony Awards	Best Actor in a Leading Role in a Musical	Dear Evan Hansen	Won	
2017	Drama League Awards	Distinguished Performance	Dear Evan Hansen	Won	
2017	Lucille Lortel Awards	Outstanding Lead Actor in a Musical	Dear Evan Hansen	Won	
2017	Broadway.com Audience Awards	Favorite Leading Actor in a Musical	Dear Evan Hansen	Won	
2017	Broadway.com Audience Awards	Favorite Onstage Pair	Dear Evan Hansen	Won	
2018	Grammy Awards	Best Musical Theater Album (Note: The 2018 Grammy Award for Best Musical Theater Album was awarded to the group consisting of: Laura Dreyfuss, Mike Faist, Rachel Bay Jones, Kristolyn Lloyd, Michael Park, Ben Platt, Will Roland & Jennifer Laura Thompson (principal soloists); Pete Ganbarg, Alex Lacamoire, Stacey Mindich, Benj Pasek & Justin Paul (producers); Benj Pasek & Justin Paul (composers/lyricists))	Dear Evan Hansen	Won	
2018	Daytime Emmy Awards	Outstanding Musical Performance in a Daytime Program (with the cast of Dear Evan Hansen)	"You Will Be Found" (performed on The Today Show)	Won	
2020	Golden Globe Awards	Best Actor – Television Series Musical or Comedy	The Politician	Nominated	
2020	Hasty Pudding Man of the Year		—N/a	Won	
2021	Golden Raspberry Awards	Worst Actor	Dear Evan Hansen	Nominated	
2021	Golden Raspberry Awards	Worst Screen Combo	Dear Evan Hansen	Nominated	
2023	Tony Awards	Best Actor in a Leading Role in a Musical	Parade	Nominated	
2024	Grammy Awards	Best Musical Theater Album	Parade	Nominated	
2024	Independent Spirit Awards	Best First Screenplay	Theater Camp	Nominated	

== See also ==
- LGBTQ culture in New York City
