= The People We Hate at the Wedding =

2022 film by Claire Scanlon

- Release poster
- Directed by: Claire Scanlon
- Screenplay by: Lizzie Molyneux-Logelin; Wendy Molyneux
- Based on: The People We Hate at the Wedding by Grant Ginder
- Produced by: Ashley Fox; Margot Hand
- Starring: Allison Janney; Ben Platt; Cynthia Addai-Robinson; Kristen Bell
- Cinematography: Oliver Stapleton
- Edited by: Wendy Greene Bricmont
- Music by: Tom Howe
- Production companies: FilmNation Entertainment; Wishmore
- Distributed by: Amazon Prime Video
- Release date: November 18, 2022
- Running time: 99 minutes
- Country: United States
- Language: English

The People We Hate at the Wedding is a 2022 American romantic comedy film directed by Claire Scanlon from a screenplay by the Molyneux sisters, based on the 2016 novel of the same name by Grant Ginder. American siblings Alice and Paul, estranged from their mother Donna and older half-sister Eloise, create family tension in the days leading up to their big sister's wedding in England.

The film stars Allison Janney, Ben Platt, Cynthia Addai-Robinson, and Kristen Bell. The People We Hate at the Wedding was released on Amazon Prime Video on November 18, 2022.

== Plot ==
Struggling siblings Alice and Paul live far from their family. He is a gay rehab center worker in a relationship with his live-in partner Dominic, who becomes neurotic when Dominic wants to open to other partners. Alice is an executive assistant at an architectural firm, having an affair with her married boss Jonathan. Her hopes that he will leave his wife are dashed when she discovers his wife has just had a baby.

Both siblings are estranged from their mother Donna, and their older half-sister Eloise, from Donna's first marriage to Henrique, a wealthy French-British playboy. She divorced him after discovering his infidelity. Donna later marries Bill and has a seemingly happy marriage, producing Alice and Paul. Eloise spends the summers with her father in Britain and never really connects with her half-siblings.

Years pass, and Eloise, now wealthy through her father's influence, becomes engaged to Ollie. Hoping to bridge the gap with her American family, she invites them to her wedding. The now-widowed Donna enthusiastically accepts, while Paul and Alice are less enthused, resentful of their mother's tie with Henrique. However, Eloise's well-meaning gesture to pay for Alice's very expensive hotel room upsets her, causing further resentment.

After Paul loses his job for empathizing with a patient, Dominic suggests that they save money by staying with Alcott, Dominic's gay older college professor. He tries to be open-minded when Dominic and Goulding engage in sexual activity and attempt to draw him into it, but then he leaves in a huff. Meanwhile, Donna reconnects with Henrique, having sex with him. He hints at wishing to reconcile with her, which delights Eloise but infuriates Paul and Alice.

There is a subplot involving Alice and Dennis Bottoms, a Nebraskan whom she meets on the plane and with whom she later has a fling with at the hotel. She spends a lot of time with him and enjoys his company. However, when she believes Jonathan is on his way to London, she falsely confesses to Dennis that she is in a relationship that she is ending.

Receiving another text from Jonathan saying he has arrived for the rehearsal dinner, she discovers it is actually his wife, after having suspected his infidelity. She tries to fight with Alice, and Dennis tells her he is done with her. A drunken Paul appears, having just broken up with Dominic. Discovering Henrique kissing a much younger woman, he urinates on his shoes and then punches him.

Fed up with the drama, Eloise throws all three Stevensons out and disinvites them to the wedding, but first she lashes out at Paul's misguided anger with his mother. While Donna had removed all traces of Bill's existence after his death, yet kept a photo of Henrique, Paul discovers she threatened to divorce Bill if he openly showed his unacceptance of Paul's homosexuality. This likely led to the cooling of their relationship in Bill's final years. Realizing that Donna had been protecting him, Paul weeps bitterly and makes up with her, as does Alice.

Although Dennis is upset at Alice's deception, he drives them all back to the hotel after the trio are booted from the dinner and jailed. The next morning, as the trio prepare to fly back home, a frantic Ollie looks for them as he cannot find Eloise anywhere. On a hunch, Donna correctly guesses she is at a Taco Bell restaurant (a childhood indulgence allowed by Donna but forbidden by Henrique) gorging on fast food.

Alice persuades Donna to let her talk to Eloise alone. She confesses she held a grudge against Eloise when she did not come to her aid after she suffered a miscarriage. Eloise apologizes, confessing that she stayed away because shortly before that she had learned that she can never conceive—a secret she has yet to share with Ollie—so was not emotionally available to support her sister. They make amends at last and Donna also persuades her to be honest with Ollie.

A year passes and the siblings are together again with Donna, this time much more happily. Ollie and Eloise are still a couple, having adopted a baby, and Dennis has forgiven Alice and they are together.

== Cast ==
- Kristen Bell as Alice Stevenson, Paul's older sister and an executive assistant at an architectural firm
  - Lexi Janicek as young Alice
- Allison Janney as Donna Stevenson, Alice and Paul's mother
- Ben Platt as Paul Stevenson, Alice's younger brother and a gay rehab center worker
- Cynthia Addai-Robinson as Eloise LeGranger
- Isaach de Bankolé as Henrique LeGranger
- Karan Soni as Dominic
- Dustin Milligan as Dennis Bottoms
- Tony Goldwyn as Dr. Goulding
- Jorma Taccone as Jonathan
- John Macmillan as Ollie
- Julian Ovenden as Alcott
- Rufus Jones as Tom
- Lizzy Caplan as Marissa
- D'Arcy Carden as Martha
- Andy Daly as Bill Stevenson

== Production ==
The People We Hate at the Wedding is a comedy written by the Molyneux sisters as an adaptation of the 2016 novel of the same name by Grant Ginder. The feature film from Amazon Studios and FilmNation Entertainment was announced in March 2021, when Allison Janney, Annie Murphy, and Ben Platt were cast and it was reported Claire Scanlon was set to direct. In July 2021, Kristen Bell joined the cast to replace Murphy. Production began in London in September 2021, with Cynthia Addai-Robinson, Karan Soni, Dustin Milligan, Tony Goldwyn, Isaach de Bankolé, Jorma Taccone, and Julian Ovenden being announced as part of the cast that month.

== Release ==
The film premiered on Amazon Prime Video on November 18, 2022.

== Reception ==
On the review aggregator website Rotten Tomatoes, 31% of 42 critics' reviews are positive, with an average rating of 4.1/10. The website's consensus reads: "An intriguingly cast but largely laugh-free comedy, The People We Hate at the Wedding will leave most viewers saying 'I don't.'" Metacritic, which uses a weighted average, assigned the film a score of 42 out of 100, based on 11 critics, indicating "mixed or average" reviews. Writing for The New York Times, Beandrea July praised the cast while criticizing the screenplay: "The casting director, Theo Park (“Ted Lasso”), is the film’s secret weapon, pulling together a stacked array of actors at the top and bottom of the call sheet that add luster to a comedically uneven but serviceable script."
