= Epcar =

Epcar is a surname. Notable people with the surname include:

- Jon Epcar, American drummer
- Richard Epcar (born 1955), American voice actor, director, and writer
