= River (Joni Mitchell song) =

1971 song by Joni Mitchell

Song by Joni Mitchell

from the album Blue
- Released: June 1971
- Studio: A&M (Hollywood, California)
- Genre: Folk
- Length: 4:00
- Label: Reprise
- Songwriter: Joni Mitchell
- Producer: Joni Mitchell

"River" is a song by Canadian singer songwriter Joni Mitchell, from her fourth studio album Blue (1971). Written on piano and concerned with feelings of geographical displacement and loss of a relationship, it has become a standard for artists in many music styles; and although the song is only set at Christmas time rather than being about the holiday, it has become popular as Christmas music. Although never released as a single, "River" holds second place among Mitchell's songs most recorded by other artists, with over a thousand such versions. In 2021, it was ranked at No. 247 on Rolling Stone's "Top 500 Best Songs of All Time".

== Background and themes ==
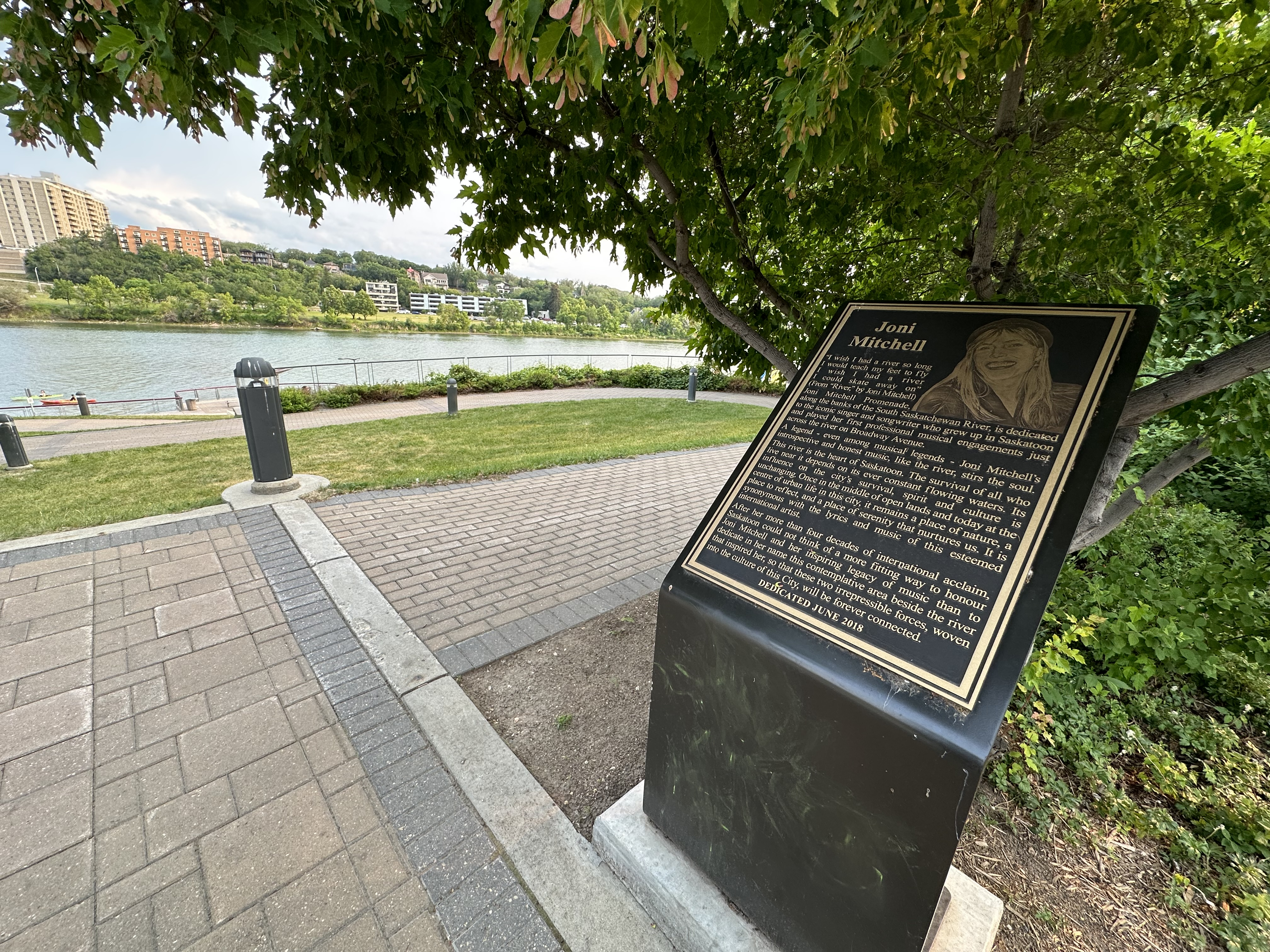
A plaque dedicated in 2018 honoring Joni Mitchell and her Saskatoon upbringing, alongside the South Saskatchewan River that inspired "River"

The refrain of the song is "I wish I had a river, I could skate away on". The first portion of the song conveys a sense of being geographically out of place, contrasting the disconcertingly warm winter climate of the Laurel Canyon, Los Angeles area with the more familiar frozen north of her Saskatoon, Saskatchewan upbringing. In his book 'Music of our Times' Canadian professor and musician Marco Adria describes ice skating "as prototypically Canadian as any other physical action." In Mitchell's own case, the notion of skating away may have extra significance because she spent a holiday season in a polio ward as a child, with fears she may never walk again.

Back in her early years as a musician, Mitchell frequently walked from the theatrical district of Saskatoon where she first started playing professionally down to the Broadway Bridge and across to the embankment along the South Saskatchewan River. In 2018, one of the two plaques erected by the city of Saskatoon to commemorate her musical beginnings there was installed at the River Landing embankment along the South Saskatchewan.

The next part of the song is about the recent breakup of a romantic relationship, with the singer longing to escape her painful emotional bonds. The key lyric is "I'm hard to handle, I'm selfish and I'm sad/Now I've gone and lost the best baby that I ever had." It is thought to be inspired by Mitchell's 1968–1970 relationship with Graham Nash.

Writer Will Blythe believes the song is connected to a visit to Chapel Hill that Mitchell made with subsequent beau James Taylor and a caroling session with his family, the Taylor family, and Mitchell. However, music historian Annie Zaleski points out that "River" already existed before this Christmas 1970 visit, and indeed had already been performed in public by Mitchell at an October 1970 concert that had been aired on BBC. Indeed, Taylor himself had been played the song by Mitchell at her Los Angeles home, soon after it was first composed by her.

== Composition and recording ==
The arrangement of the song on Blue consists of Mitchell on piano, nothing else. This accompaniment to the vocal borrows heavily from the tune to the 19th-century winter song "Jingle Bells". The song is in the key of C major, but frequently falls into the relative minor of A minor, thus giving the song more of a minor key feel. For instance, the C major can be heard under the phrase "It's coming on Christmas" while the A minor is under "I wish I had a river". The use of such minor key variations and modified chord progressions subverts the original; Salon magazine writes that "Sonically, 'River' is a moodier inversion of 'Jingle Bells,' with sleigh bells that slump and sigh, and frigid piano that rains down like a stinging ice storm."

"River" is in 4/4 time. As Salon has written, "Mitchell’s vocals are fragile but clear, capturing a protagonist exhausted by (among other things) the consequences of her own actions." The vocal range extends from G3 to E5. The instrumental outro of the song consists of Mitchell playing the melody of "Jingle Bells" with her right hand while the left had plays trichords that wander away harmonically from the key and melody, further emphasizing the dissonant feeling towards the season.

== Reactions and interpretations ==
Although the song is merely set near Christmas time, rather than being about Christmas, it has become something of a modern Christmas standard. The mood of the song is far from reflecting holiday cheer, however: Writers have assessed that "there may be no quasi-seasonal song sadder than Mitchell's"; that "there's no holiday tune that feels quite as chilly as 'River'"; and that of when it comes to "melancholy holiday music", "River" is "perhaps the saddest festive tune of them all". As such, the song is a match for those who get the winter or holiday blues.

Mitchell herself has said that "It's a Christmas song for people who are lonely at Christmas." And she commented in 2014 that, "We needed a sad Christmas song, didn't we? In the 'bah humbug' of it all?" Nonetheless, radio stations that play nothing but Christmas music during the holidays have included "River" in their rotations, making it one of more popular 'modern' compositions in the genre (and in marked contrast with the leader in that category, Mariah Carey's upbeat "All I Want for Christmas Is You").

While the song is often viewed in the context of a romantic break-up, another interpretation is that much of the song is about the daughter that Mitchell had given up for adoption some years prior. An essay by a writer at Benedictine College views the song in this light, and says that the song's themes fit the Advent season well. This is a theory that Mitchell's longtime friend Linda Ronstadt, who recorded the song in 2000, also subscribes to in part. The two had never discussed it, however, and Ronstadt has said, "But who really knows if that's what 'River' is about? The answer is: I don't know, and I bet Joni doesn't, either." James Taylor, who has also performed the song, has said that he believes the song is about a romantic break-up but that he had not discussed the matter with Mitchell concerning the identity of the person she broke the heart of, adding wryly, "There were a lot of us." Mitchell has said regarding themes of the song, "it's taking personal responsibility for the failure of a relationship."

Canadian poet and writer Mark Abley has mentioned "River" in connection to Mitchell's status as one of Saskatchewan's diaspora, saying besides referring to the land of her upbringing in her songs, it is reflected even more in her paintings, such as the praised work 40 Below 0. Beyond the specifics of geography and season and romantic break-up, "River" evokes the desire for the ability to escape a situation and start over again. The geographical contrast is also indicative of some of the contradictions of Mitchell's career, such as the tug of musical artistic ambition against record sales and popularity and that her first love was painting not music.

In any case, a variety of interpretations of "River" are possible. Indeed, an installment of the Soul Music series on BBC Radio 4 focused on the song and showed that listeners had a wide range of emotional reactions to it, including feelings relating to birth and death, home and distance, and love and loss.

== Charts ==
Chart (2019)	Peak position
Scottish Singles Sales (Official Charts)	75

== Certifications ==
Region	Certification	Certified units/sales
Canada (Music Canada)	Gold	40,000^{‡}
^{‡} Sales+streaming figures based on certification alone.

== Ellie Goulding version ==
"River"

Single by Ellie Goulding

from the EP Songbook for Christmas
- Released: 14 November 2019
- Recorded: 2019
- Length: 4:06
- Label: Polydor
- Songwriter: Joni Mitchell

Ellie Goulding singles chronology
"Return to Love" (2019)	"River" (2019)	"Worry About Me" (2020)

English singer and songwriter Ellie Goulding released a cover version of the song as a single on 14 November 2019 exclusively on Amazon Music. The song peaked at number one on the UK Singles Chart.

=== Background ===
In an interview with Billboard earlier in the year, Goulding spoke of her love for Joni Mitchell in the past, she named her as one of the first songwriters she fell in love with in her youth. She said, "Only when I got into my teens did I discover song-writing, that was when I learned the guitar, and I listened to Imogen Heap and Björk, Ani DiFranco and especially Joni Mitchell." On her social media, she said, "Joni was one of the reasons I wanted to be a songwriter. I'm honoured to have had the opportunity to cover this song."

=== Music video ===
A music video to accompany the release of "River" was first released onto YouTube on 4 December 2019. The music video was directed by David Soutar and filmed along the coastline near Dungeness. It shows Goulding and her friends picking up litter and recycled objects to make a zero-waste Christmas tree. The tree was donated to The Village Prep School in North London for the Christmas season, before being deconstructed and re-used. Goulding said, "Shooting the video in Dungeness was beautiful but a timely reminder that every single piece of plastic ever made is still on this planet. Plastic stuff is everywhere and our coastlines are suffering horrendously. It's a material that will last for hundreds of years so we need to have a plan. We wanted to show something different and to incorporate a different type of Christmas message while creating something reusable and beautiful - I'm so happy that it will live on at the Village Prep School, hopefully visiting many more schools to come."

=== Charts ===
I'm so over the moon that I got the chance to sing such a beautiful song so close to my heart by one of the best songwriters of all time – someone who inspired me greatly for the next album and it makes me so happy that people have also become new Joni fans as a result. It's been a rollercoaster of a year but can't think of a better birthday present than being the last Number 1 of the decade.

— Goulding, on her social media accounts,

On 27 December 2019, the song reached number one on the UK Singles Chart, making it the last number-one song of the decade.

The single was not released onto most common download or streaming platforms, and only available through Amazon Music and YouTube. Music industry analysts noted that it reached the top of the charts primarily on the back of passive "lean back" streams; Amazon added the song to their Christmas playlists, meaning that "River" was played whenever someone asked an Amazon Alexa smart speaker to play Christmas songs.

Chart (2019)	Peak position
UK Singles (Official Charts)	1

=== Certifications ===
Region	Certification	Certified units/sales
United Kingdom (BPI)	Silver	200,000^{‡}
^{‡} Sales+streaming figures based on certification alone.

== Other versions ==
"River" is the second-most widely recorded song in Mitchell's oeuvre: over a thousand recordings, behind only "Both Sides, Now". Many others have performed it in concert.

The song was covered by the cast of the Glee television series in 2011. The cover peaked at number forty-one on the Canadian Hot 100 and number thirty-three on the U.S. Holiday Digital Song Sales chart. The song was referenced on the television show New Girl when Jess played it repeatedly to recover from a breakup.

Linda Ronstadt covered "River" on her 2000 album Merry Little Christmas. This version was the first to be included in a Christmas album.

Heart has covered "River" during its live acoustic sets over the years.

"River" was covered by Barry Manilow on his 2002 album A Christmas Gift of Love with only one verse change involving a gender flip. It charted as a single at number seventeen on the U.S. Adult Contemporary charts.

Robert Downey Jr. sang a version of this song on the fourth season of the television series Ally McBeal and it was later included on the album A Very Ally Christmas by Vonda Shepard.

Sarah McLachlan also covered it on her 2006 album Wintersong and released it as a single. Her cover charted at number seventy-one on the Billboard Hot 100, number eight on the Billboard Adult Contemporary chart, and number two on the Canadian Singles Chart. American singer-songwriter James Taylor covered the song for his 2006 studio album James Taylor at Christmas. He had first heard the song when Mitchell played it for him at her house in 1970.

In 2006, American jazz singer Madeleine Peyroux recorded it as a duet with k. d. lang for her album Half the Perfect World.

In 2007, Herbie Hancock recorded an album of Mitchell's songs with guest vocalists called River: The Joni Letters which includes a version sung by Corinne Bailey Rae.

In 2010, Scottish musician Fran Healy performed a cover of the song for The A.V. Club's Holiday Undercover web series.

In 2017, Sam Smith covered the song as part of Spotify's Spotify Singles series. Smith's version was recorded at RAK Studios in London, England.

In 2017, Tom Chaplin of Keane covered the song on his Christmas album.

In December 2018, the song was the subject of an episode of BBC Radio 4's Soul Music, examining the song's influence on people, including Mitchell's biographer David Yaffe.

Ben Platt, as his character, Payton Hobart, performed the song during the first episode of the television series The Politician (2019), and on the soundtrack associated with the show.

A cover by Judy Collins appears on her 2019 album Winter Stories.

In the 1998 film You've Got Mail the Kathleen Kelly character, played by Meg Ryan, sub-vocalizes the song's opening lines as she types an email to the character played by Tom Hanks: It's coming on Christmas, "They're cutting down trees You know that Joni Mitchell song? I wish I had a river I could skate away on ... Such a sad song, and not really about Christmas at all but I was thinking about it tonight as I was decorating my Christmas tree …"

In 2020, Delta Goodrem covered this song and gave it a video on her Christmas album Only Santa Knows.

Darren Criss covered the song on his 2021 Christmas album A Very Darren Crissma.

On November 26, 2021, Australian singer-songwriter Gretta Ray released a cover of "River" as part of her three-song Christmas EP It's Almost Christmas in Philly.

"River" was covered by Sixpence None the Richer on its 2008 album The Dawn of Grace.

Other artists to cover "River" include Heart, LeAnn Rimes, Travis, Olivia Rodrigo, Tracey Thorn, Lighthouse Family, Weyes Blood, Indigo Girls, Holly Macve, Tom Barman and Guy Van Nueten, Harry Styles, Skye Edwards, Delta Rae.
