= Holly Macve =

Irish singer-songwriter

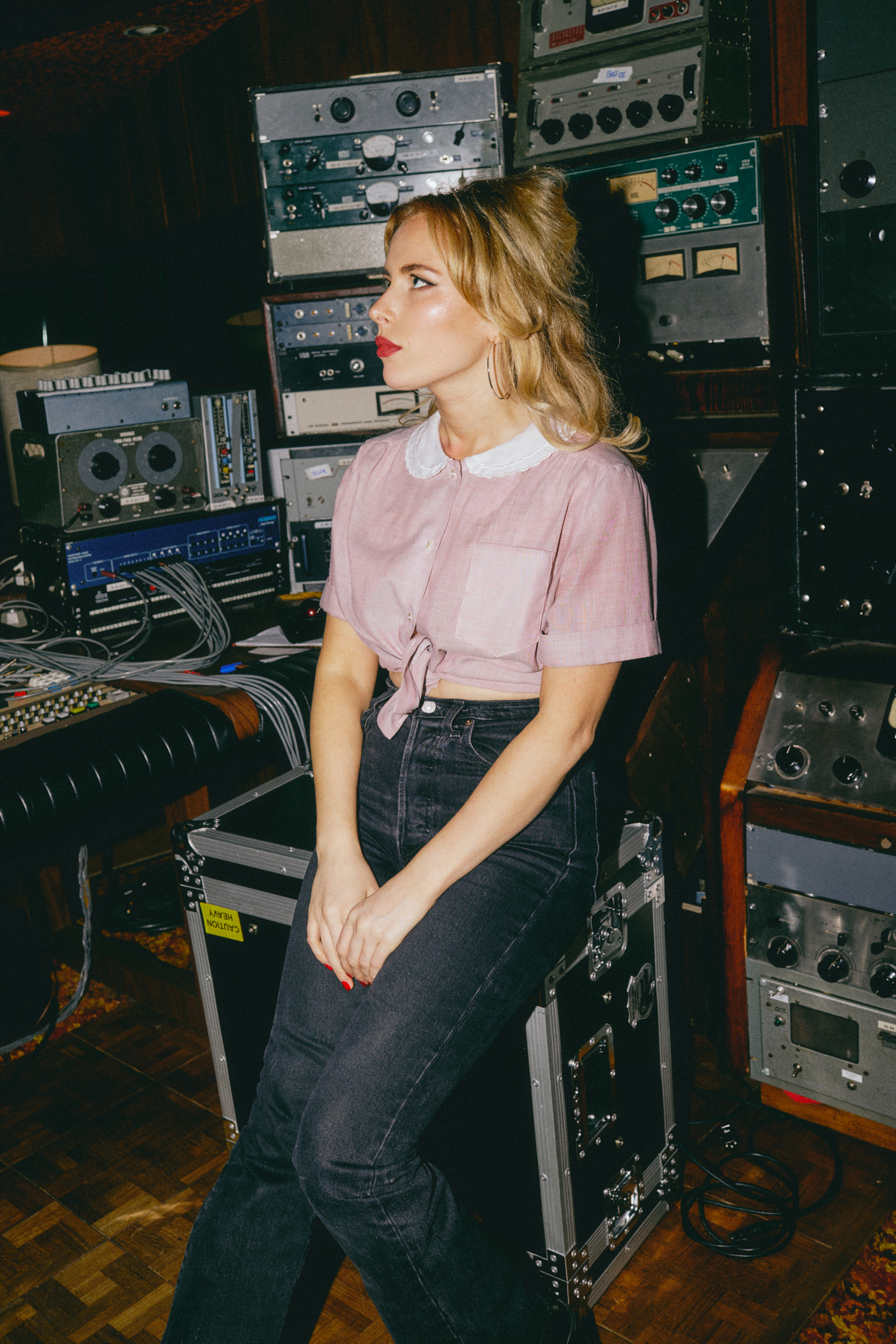
- Born: Galway, Ireland
- Occupation: Musician
- Musical career
- Genres: Alternative country; contemporary folk; dream pop; shoegaze; noir/gothic
- Works: Golden Eagle (2017); Not The Girl (2021); Wonderland (2024)
- Website: hollymacvemusic.com

Holly Macve is an Irish and British musician who performs as a solo artist. She released her first album Golden Eagle on the Bella Union label in March 2017. Her follow up album Not The Girl was released in May 2021.

== Early life ==
Born in Galway in western Ireland, Macve and her sister were whisked away "in the night" by her mother from their errant father, to live with her grandparents in Holmfirth, West Yorkshire. Macve's grandfather Duncan Druce was a classical composer.

== Music career ==
At 18, Macve moved south to Brighton where she began performing at local venues, working in a café whilst singing on open mic nights. Bella Union boss Simon Raymonde was a customer at the café, and having watched her perform, signed her to his label where she went on to record her first solo album Golden Eagle released in March 2017. The bulk of Golden Eagle was recorded in Newcastle at the home studio of producer Paul Gregory (of Bella Union label-mates Lanterns on the Lake), with extra recording in Brighton and London. On its release, Macve was described by Record Collector as "an ethereal offspring of Nick Cave blessed with the stark musical backdrop of Johnny Cash's 'American' series of recordings."

Macve has worked and toured with artists as John Grant, Villagers, Benjamin Clementine, Bill Ryder-Jones, Fiona Brice, Tony Visconti Mercury Rev and Royal Northern Sinfonia. Working with Northern Sinfonia also sparked Macve's interest in cinematic arrangements. Macve has appeared at numerous music festivals including Glastonbury, End Of The Road, Latitude, and Electric Picnic. Following her appearance at South by Southwest in Austin, Texas in 2017, Macve was labelled as one of the "top 12 notable acts" by The New York Times. Bob Boilen of NPR Music described Macve as "the best voice I heard at SXSW".

For the 2021 album Not The Girl, Macve co-produced tracks with band member Max Kinghorn-Mills. Not The Girl was mixed by Collin Dupuis, who worked on Lana Del Rey’s Ultraviolence and whom Macve considers a significant musical influence. In an interview with Rolling Stone, Del Rey was quoted as saying Macve would be the ideal person to play her in a biopic.

In October 2023 Macve released "Suburban House" featuring Lana Del Rey on her own label Loving Memory Records. Describing her collaboration with Macve, Del Rey was quoted as saying: "Ever since I heard Holly’s music I knew she had one of the most beautiful singing voices in the world. Her flawless, emotional vocals have inspired me over the last six years and I love her songs, and I’m especially proud of featuring on this one." The track is taken from her EP, "Time Is Forever" released on 2 February 2024.

On 11 October 2024. Macve released her third studio album, "Wonderland" and on 20 December 2024. she released a cover of the Joni Mitchell song, "River".

== Artistry ==
It was her mother's record collection that initially inspired the young Macve, from old blues to Bob Dylan. From these early influences, she went on to discover the likes of Leonard Cohen, Johnny Cash and Gillian Welch.

When making her second album Not the Girl, Macve listened to "loads of different things", including The Shangri-Las, The Beatles and John Lennon, John Cale, PJ Harvey, and Nick Cave.

== Discography ==
Studio albums

- Golden Eagle (2017)
- Not the Girl (2021)
- Wonderland (2024)
