= Honeymind =

Studio album by Ben Platt
- Released: May 31, 2024
- Studios: Georgia Mae (Savannah, Georgia); RCA Studio A (Nashville, Tennessee)
- Length: 48:48
- Label: Interscope
- Producers: Dave Cobb; Alex Hope; Jimmy Robbins

Ben Platt chronology
Theater Camp (Original Motion Picture Soundtrack) (2023)	Honeymind (2024)

Singles from Honeymind
- 1. "Andrew" Released: March 12, 2024; 2. "Cherry on Top" Released: April 21, 2024

Professional ratings
Review scores
Source	Rating
Slant Magazine	4/5 stars

Honeymind is the third studio album by American singer and songwriter Ben Platt, released May 31, 2024 and first since signing with Interscope. Described by Platt as a "homecoming," the album was inspired by his relationship with fiancé Noah Galvin and touches on themes of Americana and queer love.

Preceding the album's release, Platt announced on social media that the first single "Andrew" would be released on March 14, 2024. To support the upcoming album, it was announced on March 18, 2024, that Platt would hold a three-week Broadway residency at the Palace Theatre in New York City, the first announced event at the theatre since its renovations began in 2018. The residency Ben Platt: Live at the Palace ran for 18 performances from May 28, 2024, to June 15, 2024. On April 11, 2024, the album's second single "Cherry on Top" was released alongside the announcement of The Honeymind Tour, a 21-city North American tour that began on June 18, 2024, in Boston and concluded on July 27, 2024, in Seattle. The album was the first of Platt's albums to not chart on the Billboard 200.

== Track listing ==
Honeymind track listing
No.	Title	Writer(s)	Producer(s)	Length
1.	"Right Kind of Reckless"	Ben Platt; Natalie Hemby	Dave Cobb	3:28
2.	"All American Queen"	Platt; Alex Hope	Cobb	3:40
3.	"Andrew"	Platt; Hope	Cobb	4:00
4.	"Before I Knew You"	Platt; Micah Premnath; TMS	Cobb	4:11
5.	"Cherry on Top"	Platt; Ilsey Juber; Sammy Witte	Cobb	4:14
6.	"Treehouse" (featuring Brandy Clark)	Platt; Brandy Clark; Jimmy Robbins	Cobb; Robbins	3:34
7.	"Fear of Missing Out"	Hope; Donovan Woods; Platt	Cobb; Hope	3:55
8.	"Shoe to Drop"	Platt; Robbins; Laura Veltz	Cobb; Robbins	3:12
9.	"Honeymind"	Michael Pollack; Platt; Sam Roman	Cobb	3:19
10.	"Home of the Terrified"	Platt; Hope	Cobb; Hope	3:23
11.	"Need You Like This"	Platt; Hope	Cobb; Hope	4:25
12.	"The Boy Who Hung the Moon"	Platt; Robbins; Veltz	Cobb; Robbins	3:22
13.	"Monsters"	Ross Copperman; Hillary Lindsey; Platt	Cobb	4:00
Total length:				48:48

== Personnel ==
Musicians

- Ben Platt – lead vocals, backing vocals (all tracks); claps (track 2), keyboards (12)
- Dave Cobb – acoustic guitar (all tracks), electric guitar (tracks 2, 5, 8, 11, 12), bass (2)
- Philip Towns – keyboards (all tracks), claps (track 2)
- Derek Phillips – drums (tracks 1–3, 5, 7–10, 13), percussion (2, 3, 7–10, 12), claps (2)
- David Angell – violins (tracks 1, 2, 4, 5, 11, 12)
- David Davidson – violins (tracks 1, 2, 4, 5, 11, 12)
- Jenny Bifano – violins (tracks 1, 2, 4, 5, 11, 12)
- Alicia Enstrom – violins (tracks 1, 2, 4, 5, 11, 12)
- Elizabeth Lamb – violas (tracks 1, 2, 4, 5, 11, 12)
- Kristin Wilkinson – violas (tracks 1, 2, 4, 5, 11, 12)
- Austin Hoke – cello (tracks 1, 2, 4, 5, 11, 12)
- Brian Allen – bass (tracks 1, 3, 5, 7–13), claps (2)
- Ethan Barrette – claps (track 2)
- Noah Galvin – backing vocals (5)
- Brandy Clark – lead vocals (track 6)

Technical

- Pete Lyman – mastering
- Greg Koller – mixing, engineering
- Dave Cobb – vocal production
- Ethan Barrette – second engineering
- Kristin Wilkinson – string arrangement (tracks 1, 2, 4, 5, 11, 12)
- Daniel Bacigalupi – mastering assistance
- Adam Mersel – production coordination
- Andrew Brightman – production coordination

Visuals

- Vince Aung – photography
- Big Active – design

== Charts ==
Chart performance for Honeymind
Chart (2024)	Peak position
UK Americana Albums (OCC)	15
US Top Album Sales (Billboard)	24
