= Reverie (Ben Platt album) =

Studio album by Ben Platt
- Released: August 13, 2021
- Length: 39:55
- Label: Atlantic
- Producers: Ben Abraham; Jon Bellion; German; Jeff Gitty; PJ Harding; Alex Hope; Bram Inscore; Ian Kirkpatrick; The Monsters & Strangerz; Michael Pollack; Zach Skelton; Gian Stone

Ben Platt chronology
The Politician: Music from the Netflix Original Series (2019)	Reverie (2021)	Dear Evan Hansen (Original Motion Picture Soundtrack) (2021)

Singles from Reverie
- 1. "Imagine" Released: April 23, 2021; 2. "Happy to Be Sad" Released: July 16, 2021

Professional ratings
Review scores
Source	Rating
AllMusic	3/5 stars

Reverie is the second studio album by American singer and songwriter Ben Platt, released August 13, 2021, through Atlantic Records. Two singles preceded the album: "Imagine" on April 23, and "Happy to Be Sad" on July 16.

== Commercial performance ==
Reverie debuted at number 84 on the US Billboard 200 selling 6,000 pure album sales in its first week.

== Track listing ==
Reverie track listing
No.	Title	Writer(s)	Producer(s)	Length
1.	"King of the World, Pt. 1"	Ben Platt; Michael Pollack; Shane McAnally	Bram Inscore; Pollack^{[a]}; Nick Sarazen^{[a]}	1:06
2.	"Childhood Bedroom"	Platt; Julia Michaels; Ian Kirkpatrick; Gian Stone; Pollack	Stone; Kirkpatrick	3:17
3.	"Happy to Be Sad"	Platt; Pollack; Caroline Pennell; Zach Skelton	Pollack; Skelton; Stone^{[a]}	4:24
4.	"I Wanna Love You But I Don't"	Platt; Alexandra Robotham; Pollack; Stefan Johnson; Jordan Johnson; Sam Fischer	The Monsters & Strangerz; Hope; German	3:24
5.	"Leave My Mind"	Pollack; Platt; Michaels; Stone; Kirkpatrick	Stone; Kirkpatrick	3:18
6.	"Dance with You"	Ben Abraham; PJ Harding; Pollack; Stone; Platt	Pollack; Stone; Abraham; Harding	3:19
7.	"King of the World, Pt. 2"	Platt; Pollack; McAnally	Inscore; Pollack^{[a]}; Sarazen^{[a]}	1:24
8.	"Carefully"	Pollack; Platt; Robotham	Alex Hope; Pollack^{[a]}	4:45
9.	"Chasing You"	Platt; Michaels; Stone; Pollack	Stone; Pollack	3:02
10.	"Come Back"	Nate Cyphert; Platt; Pollack	Jeff Gitty	3:36
11.	"Dark Times"	Pollack; Platt; Sean Douglas; Jake Gosling	Pollack; Peter Thomas^{[a]}	4:06
12.	"Imagine"	Platt; Jonathan Bellion; Pollack; Alexander Izquierdo; J. Johnson; S. Johnson	The Monsters & Strangerz; Bellion; Stone^{[v]}; Pollack^{[v]}; S. Johnson^{[v]}	2:44
13.	"King of the World, Pt. 3"	Platt; Pollack; McAnally	Inscore; Pollack^{[a]}; Sarazen^{[a]}	1:30
Total length:				39:55

Notes

- ^{^[a]} signifies an additional producer.
- ^{^[v]} signifies a vocal producer.

== Personnel ==
- Ben Platt – vocals
- Colin Leonard – mastering
- Mitch McCarthy – mixing (tracks 1–3, 5–11)
- Manny Marroquin – mixing (tracks 4, 12)
- Gian Stone – engineering (track 12)
- Jordan K. Johnson – programming, instruments (track 12)
- Stefan Johnson – programming, instruments (track 12)
- Jon Bellion – programming, instruments (track 12)
- Michael Pollack – keyboards (track 12)
- Pierre-Luc Rioux – guitars (track 12)
- David Silberstein – production coordination (track 12)
- Jeremy Levin – production coordination (track 12)
- Christina Johnson – production coordination (track 12)
- Greg Goiterman – production coordination (track 12)
- Matty Peacock – creative direction
- Eli Russell Linnetz – album art direction

== Charts ==
Chart performance for Reverie
Chart (2021–2022)	Peak position
Australian Albums (ARIA)	67
Belgian Albums (Ultratop Flanders)	160
Hungarian Albums (MAHASZ)	36
UK Albums Sales (OCC)	32
UK Album Downloads (Official Charts)	9
US Billboard 200	84

== Release history ==
Reverie release history
Region	Date	Formats	Label	Ref.
Various	August 13, 2021	CD; digital download; streaming	Atlantic	

== Tour ==
Poster for The Reverie Tour

On August 14, 2021, Platt announced his second concert tour to promote Reverie, scheduled to begin on February 23, 2022. The tour was later postponed due to the COVID pandemic and rescheduled to begin on September 3, 2022, in Seattle, Washington before concluding in Miami, Florida on October 7, 2022, for a total of 20 stops. The tour featured Aly & AJ and Chappell Roan as its opening act. The set list included songs from Reverie, his first album Sing to Me Instead, some covers, and some Broadway tunes.

Platt played tribute to the closing of Broadway's Dear Evan Hansen on September 18, 2022, by performing "Waving Through a Window" at the Nashville stop of the tour.
