= A Girl Like Me: Letters to My Lovers =

EP by Peppermint
- Released: October 16, 2020
- Recorded: Mirrortone Studios; Hardcore Glamour Studios
- Genres: R&B; pop
- Length: 24:46
- Label: Producer Entertainment Group
- Producers: Corey TuT; Electropoint; Adam Joseph

Peppermint chronology
Blend (2018)	A Girl Like Me: Letters to My Lovers (2020)	Moment of Weakness: Letters to My Lovers (2022)

Singles from A Girl Like Me: Letters to My Lovers
- 1. "Best Sex" Released: October 2, 2020

A Girl Like Me: Letters to My Lovers is an extended play by American singer-songwriter and drag queen Peppermint. It was released on October 16, 2020 by Producer Entertainment Group and distributed by Warner's Alternative Distribution Alliance. A Girl Like Me is the first of a trilogy of EPs, with the second installment, Moment of Weakness: Letters to My Lovers, released on April 22, 2022. The lead single from the EP, "Best Sex", was released on October 2, 2020. The EP was also released alongside a short film of the same name. A remix EP called Letters (The Remixes) was released on April 16, 2021.

The EP garnered Peppermint a nomination for Outstanding Music Artist at the 2021 GLAAD Media Awards.

== Background ==
Peppermint originally planned to release a full studio album in May 2020, and issued the lead single for the project, "What You're Looking For" on February 14, 2020. However, in an interview with Entertainment Tonight on August 28, 2020, Peppermint announced that the project would in fact be a trilogy of EPs, with A Girl Like Me: Letters to My Lovers being the first in the series.

== Composition and themes ==
The album has been described as "her most personal music yet". Peppermint has said "it really does focus on my life -- who I am as a trans woman -- and everything that's happening right now [with] Black Lives Matter, Black Trans Lives Matter and a lot of the issues that we are dealing with socially." The EPs will feature collaborations with Laith Ashley, Jerome Bell, Daniel Shevlin of Well-Strung, Matt Katz-Bohen of Blondie, Corey Tut and Adam Joseph.

"Best Sex" has been described as "channel[ing] the sensuality of 90s R&B along with a dash of Vangelis-type electronica".

== Track listing ==
All tracks are written by Kya Gina Moore and produced by Electropoint Music, except where noted.

A Girl Like Me: Letters to My Lovers track listing
No.	Title	Writer(s)	Producer	Length
1.	"Submission"			0:56
2.	"Best Sex"	Kya Gina Moore; Adam Joseph	Joseph	4:45
3.	"Claimed"			0:50
4.	"Chosen One"	Moore; Joseph	Joseph	3:47
5.	"Worthy"			0:35
6.	"Girl Like Me"	Moore; Joseph	Joseph	4:17
7.	"Woke"			0:55
8.	"Will You Still Love Me Tomorrow"	Gerry Goffin; Carole King		4:12
9.	"Warmth"			0:43
10.	"Every Morning" (featuring Laith Ashley)	Moore; Joseph; Corey TuT	Corey TuT	3:46
Total length:				24:46

Letters (The Remixes) track listing
No.	Title	Length
1.	"A Girl Like Me" (Electropoint Remix)	3:58
2.	"Every Morning" (Electropoint Remix)
3.	"Chosen One" (A. J. Sealy Remix)
4.	"Every Morning" (Veggibeats Remix)
5.	"Best Sex" (Electropoint Remix)

== Personnel ==
Credits adapted from Tidal.

- Peppermint – lead vocals
- Adam Joseph – backing vocals
- Laith Ashley – featured vocals
- Daniel Shevlin – cello
- Matt Katz-Bohen – guitar, piano
- Brian Flores – guitar
- Justin Goldner – bass
- Randy Schrager – drums
- Andee Blacksugar – guitar
- Ansy Francois – horns
- Chip Tingle – horns
- Scott Englebright – horns
- Electropoint – mixing and mastering

== Release history ==
Release dates and formats for A Girl Like Me: Letters to My Lovers
Region	Date	Format	Version	Label	References
Various	October 16, 2021	digital download; streaming	Original	Producer Entertainment Group	
Various	April 16, 2021	CD	Original	Producer Entertainment Group	
Various	April 16, 2021	Digital download; streaming	Remixes	Producer Entertainment Group	
Various	May 14, 2021	Vinyl	Original	Producer Entertainment Group	
