= The Politician (soundtrack) =

The Politician: Music from the Netflix Original Series

Soundtrack album by Ben Platt
- Released: October 22, 2019
- Length: 14:46
- Label: Atlantic

Ben Platt chronology
| Sing to Me Instead (2019) | The Politician: Music from the Netflix Original Series (2019) | Reverie (2021) |

The Politician: Music from the Netflix Original Series is a soundtrack album for the Netflix series The Politician featuring Ben Platt, released by Atlantic Records on October 22, 2019. It was re-issued on July 24, 2020, with an extra track, Platt's cover of "Corner of the Sky" from the musical Pippin, following the show's second season.

== Composition ==
The collection features cover versions of Joni Mitchell's "River", Stephen Sondheim's "Unworthy of Your Love", and Billy Joel's "Vienna", as well as Platt's original song "Run Away", which also appears on his debut studio album Sing to Me Instead (2019).

== Track listing ==
1. "River" (Joni Mitchell) – 4:07
2. "Unworthy of Your Love" (Stephen Sondheim), featuring Zoey Deutch – 4:33
3. "Vienna" (Billy Joel) – 3:29
4. "Run Away" (Ben Platt) – 3:37

2020 re-issue bonus track

1. "Corner of the Sky" (Stephen Schwartz) – 3:10

Track listing adapted from Apple Music.

== Charts ==
| Chart (2019) | Peak position |
|---|---|
| US Digital Albums (Billboard) | 18 |
| US Soundtrack Albums (Billboard) | 20 |
