= Imagine (Ben Platt song) =

2021 single by Ben Platt

Single by Ben Platt

from the album Reverie
- Released: April 23, 2021
- Genre: Pop
- Length: 2:44
- Label: Atlantic
- Songwriters: Ben Platt; Michael Pollack; Jon Bellion; Eskeerdo; Stefan Johnson; The Monsters & Strangerz
- Producers: Jon Bellion; The Monsters & Strangerz

Ben Platt singles chronology
"Everything I Did to Get to You" (2020)	"Imagine" (2021)	"Happy to be Sad" (2021)

Music video
- "Imagine" on YouTube

"Imagine" is a song by American actor and singer-songwriter Ben Platt. It was written by Platt, with additional writing from Michael Pollack, Eskeerdo, Stefan Johnson, Jon Bellion and The Monsters & Strangerz, the latter two of whom also served as music producers for the song. It was released as the lead single from his second studio album, Reverie, on April 23, 2021, followed by a remixed version by Tiësto on May 28, 2021.

== Background ==
According to Platt, the song was written in 2020 while he was stuck in quarantine during the COVID-19 pandemic and during the writing process for his second solo album. He described that for both the song and its accompanying music video, he was inspired by "the way that our loved ones, the people that make life worth living, can turn the mundanity of suburbia into something magical and fantastical. Everyone has that person or people that make their world technicolor, fueling us with a love that can feel supernatural." He also stated that the song's lyrics are clearly related to his relationship with boyfriend Noah Galvin.

== Release and promotion ==
Prior to the single's release, Platt teased the chorus of the song on TikTok. The complete song was made available for pre-sale on April 20, 2021, and was released on April 23, 2021. Dutch electronic producer Tiësto released a remix of the song on May 28, 2021. An acoustic version was released on June 11, 2021.

== Music video ==
A music video for the song, directed by Matty Peacock, was released the same day as the song, which features Platt jumping on cars and levitating in mid-air in a suburban neighborhood setting.

== Live performances ==
Platt's first live performance of the song took place on the May 13, 2021 episode of The Late Late Show with James Corden. He also performed it on The Kelly Clarkson Show on June 8, 2021, as well as on the Season 20 finale of NBC's The Voice on May 25, 2021, where he also introduced a trailer for the upcoming 2021 film adaptation of Dear Evan Hansen, in which he reprises his performance in the titular role.

== Charts ==
Chart performance for "Imagine"
Chart (2021)	Peak position
Canada Hot Canadian Digital Songs (Billboard)	48
New Zealand Hot Singles (RMNZ)	33
US Adult Pop Airplay (Billboard)	27
US Digital Song Sales (Billboard)	36

== Release history ==
Release history for "Imagine"
Region	Date	Version	Format	Label
United States	April 23, 2021	Main	Digital download; streaming	Atlantic
United States	May 28, 2021	Tiësto Remix	Digital download; streaming	Atlantic
United States	June 11, 2021	Acoustic Version	Digital download; streaming	Atlantic
