= Rahne Jones =

American television actress (born 1987)

- Born: Rahne Chanae Jones
- Occupation: Actress
- Years active: 2019–present

Rahne Jones is an American television actress. She made her television debut as Skye on Netflix's The Politician in 2019. She is currently a co-host on the MTV reality show, Help! I'm in a Secret Relationship!

== Life and career ==
Jones is originally from Silver Spring, Maryland. She was named after her father, Ronnie. After graduating from Paint Branch High School in 2005, Jones attended college at Radford University on a full basketball scholarship for her freshman year. She eventually transferred to University of Maryland, Baltimore County where she got her bachelor's degree in English. After college, she worked as an inspector for the US Department of Homeland Security for 4 years before moving to NYC and pursuing theater.

Jones made her professional acting debut on the Golden Globe nominated television show The Politician which was completed after two seasons. She returned for the second season which premiered June 19, 2020.

Jones currently lives in NYC with her wife, Bridget Kelly. They have a daughter.
