= Ben Platt Live from Radio City Music Hall =

- Directed by: Alex Timbers; Sam Wrench
- Based on: Sing to Me Instead Tour
- Produced by: Gary Lanvy
- Starring: Ben Platt; Crystal Monee Hall; Kojo Littles; Allen René Louis
- Cinematography: Cameron Barnett; Brett Turnbull
- Edited by: Hamish Lyons
- Production companies: Fulwell 73; Noah Gellman Productions, LLC.
- Distributed by: Netflix
- Release date: May 20, 2020
- Running time: 85 minutes
- Country: United States
- Language: English

Ben Platt Live from Radio City Music Hall is a 2020 American concert film by actor, singer and songwriter Ben Platt. The film documents the final stop of his debut Sing to Me Instead Tour, in which the one-night-only event was recorded live on September 29, 2019, at Radio City Music Hall in New York City. The special, directed by Alex Timbers and Sam Wrench, and executive produced by Platt, Timbers, Ben Winston, Lee Lodge, Adam Mersel and Heather Reynolds, was released on Netflix on May 20, 2020.

== Cast ==
- Ben Platt

=== Background Singers ===
- Crystal Monee Hall
- Kojo Littles
- Allen René Louis

=== Musicians ===
- David Cook - Musical Director/Piano
- Mike Ricchiuti - Keyboards
- Nir Felder - Guitarist
- Justin Goldner - Guitarist
- Amanda Lo - Violin
- Reenat Pinchas – Cello
- Julia Adamy - Bassist
- Derrick Wright - Drums

== Song list ==
1. "Bad Habit"
2. "Temporary Love"
3. "Honest Man"
4. "Hurt Me Once"
5. "New"
6. "The Joke" (Brandi Carlile cover)
7. "Better"
8. "Share Your Address"
9. "Ease My Mind"
10. "Rain"
11. "In Case You Don't Live Forever"
12. "Take Me to the Pilot" (Elton John cover)
13. "Grow as We Go"
14. "Older"
15. "Run Away"

=== Notes ===
- Platt's cover of Stevie Wonder's "Overjoyed," while performed at the concert, is not featured in the special.
