= The Joke (song) =

2017 single by Brandi Carlile

Single by Brandi Carlile

from the album By the Way, I Forgive You
- Released: November 13, 2017
- Studio: RCA Studio A in Nashville
- Genre: Americana
- Length: 4:39
- Label: Low Country Sound; Elektra
- Songwriters: Brandi Carlile; Dave Cobb; Phil Hanseroth; Tim Hanseroth
- Producers: Dave Cobb; Shooter Jennings

Brandi Carlile singles chronology
"Free Ride" (2014)	"The Joke" (2017)	"Every Time I Hear That Song" (2018)

"The Joke" is a song recorded by American singer-songwriter Brandi Carlile. It was co-written by Carlile, Dave Cobb, and Phil and Tim Hanseroth, and produced by Cobb and Shooter Jennings. It was released on November 13, 2017, as the lead single off By the Way, I Forgive You, Carlile's sixth album. With music inspired by "An American Trilogy" by Elvis Presley, the lyrics are intended to uplift people who are marginalized by society. The song received widespread critical acclaim, winning two Grammy Awards.

== Writing and production ==
"The Joke" first came about when Carlile and producer and co-writer Dave Cobb started talking about Carlile's most successful single, '"The Story". Carlile told NPR "it started off with Dave insinuating that we haven't had a vocal moment like "The Story" since, well, "The Story" [...] we all went home that night and I was like, who tells you to rewrite a song that you wrote a decade ago? But it just kept nagging me – like the truth does, you know".

Cobb later played her "An American Trilogy" by Elvis Presley during a session. Cobb explained, "I was playing her Elvis Presley's "American Trilogy"...there's something magical about that recording. I mean it's the way it affects you; the way it's big in the chords, just pulling every single emotion out of you. So I played that, and then she wrote "The Joke". [laughs] I played her one of the greatest songs of all time, and then she wrote one of the greatest written since that one".

Lyrically, the song uplifts people who struggle to fit the molds made for them by modern society. Carlile said on NPR of the track, "There are so many people feeling misrepresented [today] ... So many people feeling unloved. Boys feeling marginalized and forced into these kind of awkward shapes of masculinity that they do or don't belong in ... so many men and boys are trans or disabled or shy. Little girls who got so excited for the last election, and are dealing with the fallout. The song is just for people that feel under-represented, unloved or illegal."

== Critical reception ==
The Joke was widely acclaimed by music critics, with major praise going for its melody and the subject matter in its lyrics. Magazine American Songwriter called the track's intensity "mind-blowing", and dubbed it "a true masterpiece". NPR lauded the single as "A country-rock aria dedicated to the delicate boys and striving girls born into — and, Carlile insists, destined to triumph over — this divisive time." Rolling Stone called the track an "anthemic ballad", and The A.V. Club described it as "a beacon of hope for those discouraged by today's political climate". Said Slant, "The song's chorus explodes with catharsis, big emotions that are earned by Carlile's storytelling but driven home by the cinematic arrangement." Billboard and American Songwriter ranked the song number three and number one, respectively, on their lists of the 10 greatest Brandi Carlile songs. Rolling Stone included it as #15 on its list of the most inspirational LGBTQ songs of all time, and at #195 on its 200 Greatest Country Songs of All Time ranking.

== Accolades ==
On December 7, 2018, the nominations for the 61st Annual Grammy Awards were revealed. "The Joke" was nominated in four categories, including Record of the Year and Song of the Year. Carlile was nominated for six awards total, making her the most nominated woman of 2019's ceremony. "The Joke" won the Grammy awards for Best American Roots Song and Best American Roots Performance.

== Chart performance ==
Following the song's wins and Carlile's performance of the song at the 2019 Grammys, "The Joke" debuted at number 1 on the February 23rd dated Billboard Rock Digital Song Sales chart. The song also re-entered the Hot Rock Songs chart at number 4, becoming Carlile's first song ever to reach the top 30.

== Live performances ==
On March 14, 2018, Carlile performed the song on The Late Show with Stephen Colbert, in November 2018, at the Americanafest, on February 10, 2019 at the 61st Grammy Awards and later, the same week, on The Ellen DeGeneres Show. On February 14, 2025, Carlile performed the song as part of the NBC network special, SNL50: The Homecoming Concert.

== Cover versions ==
Actor and singer Ben Platt performed the song during his Sing to Me Instead Tour in 2019. A live recording, featuring “The Joke”, was filmed at Radio City Music Hall on September 29, 2019 and released by Netflix on May 20, 2020. The deluxe version of Platt’s debut album was released on the same day and includes his live cover of “The Joke”.

== Charts ==
Chart (2018–19)	Peak position
US Bubbling Under Hot 100 (Billboard)	4
US Adult Alternative Airplay (Billboard)	4
US Hot Rock & Alternative Songs (Billboard)	4
US Rock & Alternative Airplay (Billboard)	46
