= The People We Hate at the Wedding (novel) =

Humorous Novel by Grant Grinder

- First edition (publ. Flatiron Books)
- Author: Grant Ginder
- Language: English
- Publication date: 2016

The People We Hate at the Wedding is a 2016 novel by Grant Ginder about a dysfunctional blended family who come together to celebrate the wedding of Eloise Lafarge, the eldest sibling of the family. In 2022, the novel was adapted into a movie of the same name, which was released on Amazon Prime on November 18, 2022.

== Summary ==
American siblings Paul and Alice learn their elder half-sister Eloise is getting married in England. Both siblings harbor resentment towards Eloise, the child from their mother, Donna, and her first marriage to cosmopolitan Frenchman Henrique, who left Eloise a substantial trust fund. Both siblings are also deeply unhappy with their lives. Paul works for a man he hates and is in a relationship with a narcissistic, controlling academic, while Alice is still struggling with the trauma of a stillbirth five years earlier and is having an affair with a married man.

Alice reluctantly agrees to be Eloise's bridesmaid while Paul initially declines to go due to his estrangement from their mother, Donna, but eventually agrees after losing his job in a dramatic fashion.

In London, Alice is devastated when she learns that the hotel she booked has been paid for by Eloise. Paul is pressured into a threesome by his boyfriend Mark and is dumped shortly before the wedding. Eloise meanwhile is distressed that all her attempts to reunite her family seem to go awry. She also attempts to reunite her mother and father.

The evening before the wedding Paul gets drunk and tells Eloise's future in-laws about the threesome. Eloise angrily reveals that while Paul has been mad at Donna for erasing the memory of his father after his death, Donna was actually protecting him, as his father was homophobic and never accepted Paul after he came out. Paul discovers Henrique kissing a much younger woman and urinates on him in retaliation, and is later arrested.

The wedding is eventually delayed because Eloise does not want to go through with it. She confides to Paul that she always wanted a loving, functional family and fears that whatever family she creates will be as dysfunctional as her old one. Paul pushes her to attempt to try nevertheless, and Eloise agrees to go forward with her wedding.

== Reception ==
Kirkus labelled the novel as "gleefully outrageous" and "good fun". Publishers Weekly awarded a starred review, describing that the book provided "laughter and hope".

== Adaptation ==
In 2022, the novel was adapted into a movie of the same name, and was released on Amazon Prime on November 18, 2022.
