= Justin Goldner =

American music producer

- Origin: Philadelphia, Pennsylvania
- Occupations: Producer, songwriter, musician, arranger
- Instruments: Bass, guitar, mandolin, keyboards, electronics
- Years active: 2007–present
- Website: funkybutter.com

Justin Goldner is an American music producer, songwriter, arranger and session musician originally from Philadelphia, Pennsylvania.

His performances have been featured on Grammy, Latin Grammy and Tony award-winning projects (Dear Evan Hansen), as well as the Golden Globe winning film The Greatest Showman, Disney's live-action Snow White, and television shows including Hazbin Hotel. He is a frequent contributor to projects by composers Pasek and Paul and Jason Robert Brown, including the latter’s Broadway musical The Bridges of Madison County.

Goldner has been featured in mandolin performances with Sting at Carnegie Hall and live on NBC’s Christmas at Rockefeller Center, as well as live performance with Ben Platt on the 60th Annual Grammy Awards telecast from Madison Square Garden. He also appears in Platt's Live from Radio City Music Hall concert special on Netflix.

As a music producer and songwriter, Goldner is known for drawing upon both acoustic and electronic textures. Since 2009, his work as producer and bandleader of Grace McLean & Them Apples has yielded two EPs and the full-length My Lovely Enemy, combining McLean’s vocal looping techniques with organic instruments, garnering recognition in Rolling Stone and the New York Times.

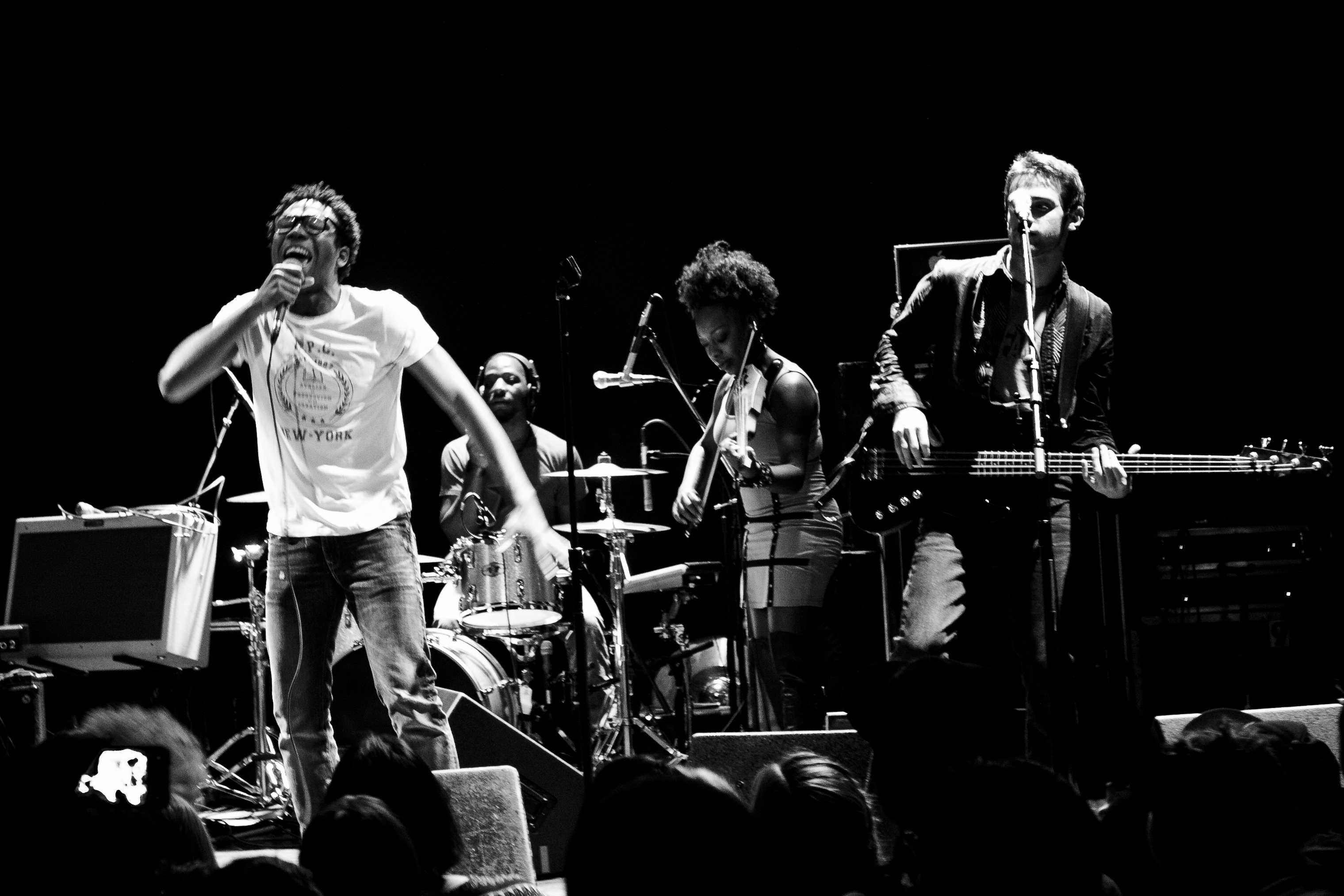
Goldner performing with Childish Gambino at Bowery Ballroom in New York

Goldner participated in developing the music for Pasek and Paul’s films The Greatest Showman, Spirited, and Lyle, Lyle Crocodile, as well as their musical Dear Evan Hansen, which he ultimately performed on Broadway and in the 2021 film adaptation. He has been featured in other performances with Ricky Martin, Macy Gray, Tori Kelly, Cynthia Erivo, Donald Glover, Shawn Mendes, Ledisi, Bruce Springsteen, James Taylor, Natasha Bedingfield, Idina Menzel, Jordin Sparks, Jin (BTS), Aloe Blacc, Lizzy McAlpine, Anaïs Mitchell, JC Chasez & Lance Bass (*NSYNC), Renée Fleming, Max Martin, Ludwig Goransson, Ariana DeBose, Stephen Sondheim, Lin-Manuel Miranda, T Bone Burnett, Alan Menken, Chris Thile, Matisyahu, Amanda Brown, Steve Martin, John Turturro, Allison Williams, Jane Monheit, Twyla Tharp, Ryan Beatty, Darren Criss, Jesse McCartney, Emily Kinney, Audra McDonald, Jeremy Jordan, Milck, Lolo, Grace Weber, Elle Varner, Lawrence, and his mentor, Meshell Ndegeocello.

Other notable production and songwriting releases have included folk-pop trio Saint Adeline's eponymous debut album, Cinco Paul & Ken Daurio's Bubble Boy, and "Destiny", included on Hasbro's Jem & The Holograms tribute album. Goldner has also performed classically with the Chelsea Symphony and Teatro Graticello, and performed live electronics and sound design with new acoustic crossover group 9 Horses. He is known as well for collaborations with global artists, including Bollywood composers Shankar Mahadevan and Vishal Bhardwaj, Latin Grammy-winning Venezuelan vocalist/trumpeter Linda Briceño and Cuban rock band Del Exilio.

== Discography ==
=== Production & Songwriting ===
- Grace McLean – My Lovely Enemy (2024)
- Mike Tedesco – Grand Delusions (2024)
- Tori Kelly – "Waving Through a Window" (2021)
- Ariana DeBose – "Shall We Dance" (2021)
- Anne of Green Gables: A New Musical (2020)
- Drew Gasparini – We Aren't Kids Anymore (2020)
- Mike Tedesco – Hardly Recognizable (2019)
- Hey Guy – "Stereo" (2019), "Every Turn" (2024)
- Jared Saltiel – Out of Clay (2018)
- 9 Horses – "The Water Understands" (2017)
- Cinco Paul – Bubble Boy [Original Cast Recording] (2017)
- Alice J Lee – "In Love With Drew", "Trouble" (2016)
- Janet Krupin – Hipster Pinup (2016)
- Saint Adeline – Saint Adeline (2016)
- Barnaby Bright – "Destiny" (released on Truly Outrageous: A Tribute to Starlight Records, 2015)
- Grace McLean & Them Apples – Natural Disaster (2015)
- Bri Arden – All The Above (2014)
- Abby Bernstein – Talk in Tongues (2012)
- Ryan Amador – Symptoms of a Wide-Eyed Being (2012)
- Grace McLean & Them Apples – Make Me Breakfast (2012)
- Carrie Manolakos – Echo (2012)
- Shaina Taub – What Otters Do (2011)

=== As a Performer ===
- Honey Don't (Original Motion Picture Soundtrack) (2025)
- Disney's Snow White (Original Motion Picture Soundtrack) (2025)
- Lila DuPont – Touch the Ground (2025)
- Jason Robert Brown and Stephen Sondheim: Live in Concert (2024)
- Hazbin Hotel (Original Soundtrack) (2024)
- Alisan Porter – The Ride (2024)
- 9 Horses – Strum (2024)
- Miles East – Between Lightning And Thunder (2024)
- Spirited (Soundtrack from the Apple Original Film) (2022)
- Lyle Lyle Crocodile (Original Motion Picture Soundtrack) (2022)
- Dear Evan Hansen (Original Motion Picture Soundtrack) (2021)
- 9 Horses – Omegah (2021)
- Janita – Here Be Dragons (2021)
- Ben Platt – Sing To Me Instead: Deluxe Edition (2020)
- Peppermint – A Girl Like Me: Letters to My Lovers (2020)
- Georgia Stitt – A Quiet Revolution (2020)
- Kathryn Allison – Something Real (2019)
- Linda Briceño – 11 (Ella Bric & the Hidden Figures) (2018)
- Jason Robert Brown – How We React and How We Recover (2018)
- Tim Kubart – Building Blocks (2018)
- Celia Woodsmith – Cast Iron Shoes (2018)
- Dear Evan Hansen (Original Broadway Cast Recording) (2017)
- The Greatest Showman (Original Motion Picture Soundtrack) (2017)
- J3PO – Memory (2017)
- Jon Epcar – Morning Drone (2017)
- Clinton Curtis – Getaway Car (2016)
- Dillon Kondor – Hostage (2016)
- Jihae – Illusion of You (2015)
- The Bridges of Madison County (Original Broadway Cast Recording) (2014)
- Del Exilio – Panamericano (2013)
- Kerrigan/Lowermilk Live (2013)
- Nick Blaemire & The Hustle (2012)
- Drew Gasparini – I Could Use A Drink (2012)

== Orchestration & Arranging ==
- Anne of Green Gables (Matte O'Brien & Matt Vinson)
- Bhangin It (Sam Willmott)
- Karate Kid (Drew Gasparini)
- Bubble Boy (Cinco Paul & Ken Daurio)
- The Louder We Get (Colleen Dauncey & Akiva Romer-Segal)
- Deathless (Zack Zadek)
- It's Kind of a Funny Story (Drew Gasparini)
- Hood (Lewis Flinn)
- The Space Between Us
- The Daughters (Shaina Taub)
- We Aren't Kids Anymore (Drew Gasparini)
