= Jon Epcar =

American drummer

- Origin: Los Angeles, California
- Genres: rock, jazz, electronic
- Instrument: drums
- Website: https://jonepcar.org

Jon Epcar is an American drummer;

== Biography ==
He is best known for his work with the band Carney and on Bono and The Edge's Broadway musical, Spider-Man: Turn Off the Dark. His playing has also been featured on recordings and performances with Carly Rae Jepsen, John Legend, Rihanna, Justin Timberlake, and Natasha Bedingfield.

In 2017, Epcar released the solo instrumental album Morning Drone, featuring collaborations with Zane Carney, Justin Goldner, Isamu McGregor, Sean Erick and Daniel Tirer, performing songs from it live at The Kennedy Center in Washington, D.C. He has also performed and toured with his former bandmate, Reeve Carney.
