= Sing to Me Instead =

Studio album by Ben Platt
- Released: March 29, 2019
- Genre: Pop
- Length: 44:49
- Label: Atlantic
- Producers: Jenn Decilveo; Finneas; Alex Hope; Michael Pollack; Jordan Riley; Andrew Wells; Eg White

Ben Platt chronology
Dear Evan Hansen (Original Broadway Cast Recording) (2017)	Sing to Me Instead (2019)	The Politician: Music from the Netflix Original Series (2019)

Singles from Sing to Me Instead
- 1. "Bad Habit" Released: February 1, 2019; 2. "Grow as We Go" Released: May 6, 2019

Sing to Me Instead is the debut studio album by American actor/singer Ben Platt. It was released on March 29, 2019. Two songs were released from the album on February 1, 2019: "Bad Habit" and "Ease My Mind". It is the actor's first creative project after originating the role of the titular character in the Broadway musical Dear Evan Hansen aside from appearing on one of Lin-Manuel Miranda's Hamildrops, "Found/Tonight".

Platt premiered the first single "Bad Habit" during a live performance and collaboration with Foley Gallery in early 2019. He later performed the song on The Late Show with Stephen Colbert on February 21, 2019. "Ease My Mind", "Grow as We Go" and "Temporary Love" were released as pre-release downloads on February 13, March 1, and March 8, 2019, respectively. Each song was accompanied with a music video premiere on YouTube. A deluxe edition of the album was released on May 20, 2020, in conjunction with the release of the Netflix special, Ben Platt Live from Radio City Music Hall.

== Track listing ==
Track listing adapted from Apple Music. Credits adapted from Spotify and Tidal.

Sing to Me Instead track listing
No.	Title	Writer(s)	Producer(s)	Length
1.	"Bad Habit"	Ben Abraham; Ben Platt; Jenn Decilveo; Jesse Thomas; Wrabel	Decilveo	4:22
2.	"Ease My Mind"	Abraham; Platt; Decilveo	Decilveo	4:37
3.	"Temporary Love"	Abraham; Platt; Decilveo; Johnny Price	Decilveo	3:37
4.	"Grow as We Go"	Alexandra Robotham; Abraham; Platt	Alex Hope	4:09
5.	"Honest Man"	Platt; Decilveo; Jordan Riley	Decilveo; Riley	3:49
6.	"Hurt Me Once"	Platt; Francis Anthony White	Eg White	4:00
7.	"New"	Andrew Wells; Audra Mae; Platt	Wells	3:10
8.	"Better"	Platt; Michael Pollack; Nate Cyphert	Decilveo	3:11
9.	"Share Your Address"	Platt; Decilveo; Cyphert; Oren Yoel	Decilveo	3:02
10.	"In Case You Don't Live Forever"	Platt; Decilveo; Pollack; Cyphert	Decilveo	3:48
11.	"Older"	Platt; Decilveo; Pollack; Cyphert	Pollack; Decilveo^{[a]}	3:27
12.	"Run Away"	Platt	Decilveo	3:37
Total length:				44:49

Sing to Me Instead digital version bonus tracks
No.	Title	Writer(s)	Producer(s)	Length
13.	"So Will I"	Platt; Finneas Baird O'Connell; Pollack	Finneas	4:11
14.	"Rain"	Alex Hope; Platt; Pollack; Samuel Harry Fisher	Hope	3:33
15.	"Honest Man" (Live from Radio City Music Hall)	Platt; Decilveo; Riley		3:59
16.	"The Joke" (Brandi Carlile cover) (Live from Radio City Music Hall)	Carlile; Dave Cobb; Phil Hanseroth; Tim Hanseroth		4:27
17.	"Share Your Address" (Live from Radio City Music Hall)	Platt; Decilveo; Cyphert; Yoel		5:09
18.	"Ease My Mind" (Live from Radio City Music Hall)	Abraham; Platt; Decilveo		4:40
19.	"Take Me to the Pilot" (Elton John cover) (Live from Radio City Music Hall)	John; Bernie Taupin		4:28
20.	"Grow as We Go" (Live from Radio City Music Hall)	Robotham; Abraham; Platt		4:13

=== Notes ===
- ^{^[a]} signifies a co-producer

== Personnel ==
Credits adapted from AllMusic.

- Jenn Decilveo – drum programming, mellotron, organ, piano, synthesizer, background vocals
- Larry Goldings – organ
- Jacob Green – electric guitar
- Alex Hope – guitars
- Sam Kauffman-Skloff – drums
- Patrick Kelly – bass
- David Levita – guitar
- Michael Pollack – piano, Juno synth
- Michael Wooten – organ
- Julia Adamy – bass (tracks 16–20)
- David Cook – piano (tracks 16–20)
- Nir Felder – guitars (tracks 16–20)
- Justin Goldner – guitars (tracks 16–20)
- Crystal Monee Hall – background vocals (tracks 16–20)
- Kojo Littles – background vocals (tracks 16–20)
- Amanda Lo – violin (track 17)
- Allen René Louis – background vocals (tracks 16–20)
- Renat Pinchas – cello (track 17)
- Mike Ricchiuti – organ (tracks 16–20)
- Derrick Wright – drums (tracks 16–20)
- Jordan Katz – trumpet
- Mike Rocha – trumpet
- Charlie Bisharat – strings
- Meredith Crawford – strings
- Ross Gasworth – strings
- Kevin Hart – string arrangements, strings
- Luanne Homzy – strings
- Benjamin Jacobson – strings
- Kevin Kumar – strings
- Jim McMillan – strings, string orchestrator
- Linnea Powell – strings
- Mary Sloan – strings

== Charts ==
Chart performance for Sing to Me Instead
Chart (2019)	Peak position
Australian Albums (ARIA)	32
Canadian Albums (Billboard)	57
Scottish Albums (Official Charts)	50
UK Albums (Official Charts)	79
US Billboard 200	18

== Release history ==
Release dates and formats for Sing to Me Instead
Region	Date	Formats	Label	Edition	Ref.
Various	March 29, 2019	CD; digital download; streaming	Atlantic	Standard	
Various	May 20, 2020	CD; digital download; streaming	Atlantic	Deluxe	
