= The Politician (TV series) =

American dramedy television series

- Genre: Satire; Comedy drama; Political satire; Cringe comedy
- Created by: Ryan Murphy; Brad Falchuk; Ian Brennan
- Starring: Ben Platt; Zoey Deutch; Lucy Boynton; Bob Balaban; David Corenswet; Julia Schlaepfer; Laura Dreyfuss; Theo Germaine; Rahne Jones; Benjamin Barrett; Jessica Lange; Gwyneth Paltrow; Judith Light; Bette Midler
- Opening theme: "Chicago" by Sufjan Stevens
- Composer: Mac Quayle
- Country of origin: United States
- Original language: English
- No. of seasons: 2
- No. of episodes: 15

Production
- Executive producers: Ryan Murphy; Brad Falchuk; Ian Brennan; Alexis Martin Woodall; Ben Platt; Gwyneth Paltrow
- Producers: Kenneth Silverstein; Todd Nenninger; Lou Eyrich; Eryn Krueger Mekash; Kristin Bernstein; Jeff Dickerson
- Cinematography: Nelson Cragg; Simon Dennis; Tim Norman
- Editors: Shelly Westerman; Danielle Wang; Peggy Tachdjian; Chris A. Peterson; Franzis Muller; Erick Fefferman; Lisa Trulli; Lauren Stewart; Tom Kipley
- Camera setup: Single-camera
- Running time: 28–62 minutes
- Production companies: Prospect Films; Brad Falchuk Teley-Vision; Ryan Murphy Television; 20th Television (Note: Credited as Fox 21 Television Studios for seasons 1 & 2.)

Original release
- Network: Netflix
- Release: September 27, 2019 – June 19, 2020

The Politician is an American comedy-drama television series created by Ryan Murphy, Brad Falchuk, and Ian Brennan and released on Netflix. The trio also serves as executive producers with Alexis Martin Woodall, Ben Platt, and Gwyneth Paltrow. The series centers on the story of Payton Hobart (Platt), a wealthy Santa Barbaran, and each season revolves around a different political race his character is involved in.

The first season was released on Netflix on September 27, 2019. The series stars Ben Platt, Zoey Deutch, Lucy Boynton, Bob Balaban, Laura Dreyfuss, Julia Schlaepfer, Theo Germaine, Rahne Jones, and Gwyneth Paltrow. David Corenswet, Benjamin Barrett, and Jessica Lange joined the main cast in the first season, while Judith Light and Bette Midler joined the main cast in the second season. Production on the second season started in November 2019, which premiered on June 19, 2020. As of 2026 Netflix has not made any official announcement whether the show is cancelled or will receive a third season.

== Premise ==
The first season is set at the fictional Saint Sebastian High School in Santa Barbara, California. Payton Hobart, who has dreamed of being elected President of the United States since childhood, is running for student body president against the popular and athletic River Barkley. Payton, under the direction of his ambitious friends McAfee Westbrook, James Sullivan, and Alice Charles, chooses Infinity Jackson, a cancer patient and victim of Munchausen by Proxy disorder, to be his vice-president. Meanwhile, River, under the direction of his girlfriend Astrid Sloan, chooses Skye Leighton, a gender-nonconforming black classmate, to be his vice-president.

The second season is set in New York City and Albany, New York. Payton, now a student at New York University, is running for a seat in the New York State Senate against incumbent Majority Leader Dede Standish. Payton, under the direction of his former classmates and climate activist Infinity Jackson, runs an ecocentric campaign. Standish, under the direction of her conniving campaign manager Hadassah Gold, runs a more conservative campaign. Meanwhile, Payton's adoptive mother, Georgina Hobart, having also become a politician on a whim, is running to be Governor of California.

== Cast and characters ==
=== Main ===
- Ben Platt as Payton Hobart, an ambitious man who ran for student body president at St. Sebastian and later for State Senate of New York.
- Zoey Deutch as Infinity Jackson, Payton's former running mate who becomes an activist for the environment.
- Lucy Boynton as Astrid Sloan, Payton's rival and River's former girlfriend.
- Bob Balaban as Keaton Hobart (season 1), Payton's adoptive father.
- David Corenswet as River Barkley (season 1; recurring season 2), Payton's opponent for student body president.
- Julia Schlaepfer as Alice Charles, Payton's girlfriend and later fiancée.
- Laura Dreyfuss as McAfee Westbrook, Payton's campaign manager and advisor.
- Theo Germaine as James Sullivan, Payton's campaign manager and advisor.
- Rahne Jones as Skye Leighton, River's former running mate who is now helping Payton with his New York campaign.
- Benjamin Barrett as Ricardo (season 1; guest season 2), Infinity's former dim-witted boyfriend.
- Jessica Lange as Dusty Jackson (season 1), Infinity's grandmother and former caretaker.
- Gwyneth Paltrow as Georgina Hobart, Payton's adoptive mother.
- Judith Light as Dede Standish (season 2; guest season 1), the New York State Senate Majority Leader.
- Bette Midler as Hadassah Gold (season 2; guest season 1), Dede's Chief of Staff.

=== Recurring ===
- Ryan J. Haddad as Andrew Cashman, a former student with cerebral palsy at St. Sebastian who is now helping Payton with his New York campaign.
- Kobi Kumi-Diaka as Pierre Toussaint (season 1), the only Haitian student studying at St. Sebastian.
- Trevor Mahlon Eason as Martin Hobart, one of Payton's brothers.
- Trey Eason as Luther Hobart, one of Payton's brothers.
- Natasha Ofili as Principal Vaughn (season 1), the Principal at St. Sebastian who is registered deaf.
- B.K. Cannon as Kris
- Martina Navratilova as Brigitte (season 1), a horse trainer who is also Georgina's lover.
- Dylan McDermott as Theo Sloan (season 1), Astrid's father.
- January Jones as Lisbeth Sloan (season 1), Astrid's mother.
- Sam Jaeger as Tino McCutcheon (season 2; guest season 1), the Junior Senator-Elect from Texas.
- Joe Morton as Marcus Standish (season 2; guest season 1), Dede's husband.
- Teddy Sears as William Ward (season 2; guest season 1), the third in Dede and Marcus' throuple.
- Jackie Hoffman as Sherry Dougal (season 2; guest season 1), the receptionist at Dede Standish's campaign office.

=== Guest ===
- Jordan Nichole Wall as Ivy (season 1), a girl with Down's syndrome on the school bus.
- Rick Holmes as Cooper (season 1)
- Eric Nenninger as Detective (season 1)
- Rudy Pankow as Other Kid (season 1)
- Russell Posner as Elliot Beachman (season 1)
- Jake Tapper as himself, a CNN correspondent and moderator for the gubernatorial debate.
- Terry Sweeney as Buddy Broidy (season 1)
- Robin Weigert as Andi Mueller (season 2)
- Susannah Perkins as Jayne Mueller (season 2)

== Episodes ==
| Season | Episodes | Originally released |
|---|---|---|
| 1 | 8 | September 27, 2019 |
| 2 | 7 | June 19, 2020 |

=== Season 1 (2019) ===
| No. overall | No. in season | Title | Directed by | Written by | Original release date | Prod. code |
|---|---|---|---|---|---|---|
| 1 | 1 | "Pilot" | Ryan Murphy | Ryan Murphy & Brad Falchuk & Ian Brennan | September 27, 2019 | 1BAC01 |
Payton Hobart, a student at St. Sebastian High School in Santa Barbara, California, is running for student body president, which he explains to a Harvard admissions representative is one step in his dream to become President of the United States. However, he is waitlisted. He lives with his wealthy adopted family, led by the matriarch Georgina. His opponent in the race is River Barclay, a friend of Payton's with whom he'd previously had a relationship. Payton is advised by his friends McAfee, James, and his girlfriend Alice. When Payton learns that River has convinced Skye Leighton, a gender-nonconforming black classmate, to be his running mate, Payton confronts him. River informs Payton that he only did so on his girlfriend Astrid Sloan's direction, apologizes to Payton, telling him that he loves him, and commits suicide in front of Payton. Following River's death, Astrid takes his spot on the ticket, retaining Skye as her running mate. Alice and Payton agree to a public breakup to gain sympathy for him. Payton later chooses Infinity Jackson, a student suffering from cancer, as his running mate, but is told by a student named Andrew that she is faking it.
| 2 | 2 | "The Harrington Commode" | Brad Falchuk | Ryan Murphy & Brad Falchuk & Ian Brennan | September 27, 2019 | 1BAC02 |
Georgina tells Keaton, Payton's adoptive father, that she's in love with a woman and wants a divorce, leading Keaton to attempt suicide; he survives, and is put into a medically-induced coma. When Payton's adopted brothers, twins Martin and Luther, plan to use a clause in their parents' prenuptial agreement to take the fortune, Payton schemes with Keaton, who recently woke up from his coma, allowing Keaton to foil an attempt at patricide from the twins; Keaton writes the twins out of the will. Meanwhile, following a suggestion from McAfee, Payton organizes a blood drive for a campaign event, allowing them to run tests on Infinity's blood, which reveals she does not, in fact, have cancer, and that her grandmother Dusty is making her sick on purpose.
| 3 | 3 | "October Surprise" | Janet Mock | Ryan Murphy & Brad Falchuk & Ian Brennan | September 27, 2019 | 1BAC03 |
Payton meets with the Harvard Admissions representatives, who promised to remove him from the waitlist if he donates millions for a new department. Payton, however, tells them he doesn't need Harvard, which causes Harvard to accept him unconditionally. He goes to tell Alice, but finds her in bed with James. James, however, shows loyalty by tricking Astrid and Skye into making themselves look bad at a campaign event. Meanwhile, Infinity's boyfriend Ricardo gives Astrid a tape to make Payton look bad. The tap shows Infinity calling a reporter 'buttmunch' and she comes under fire, with Payton removing her from the ticket. Infinity breaks up with Ricardo, who breaks into Astrid's house and seemingly kidnaps her.
| 4 | 4 | "Gone Girl" | Helen Hunt | Ryan Murphy & Brad Falchuk & Ian Brennan | September 27, 2019 | 1BAC04 |
Infinity, after being told by Payton that her grandmother is making her sick, confronts Dusty at dinner and walks away from her. While the school community believes Astrid was kidnapped, it is revealed that Astrid convinced Ricardo to run away with her to New York City. Payton is interrogated for his possible role in Astrid's disappearance, but Georgina and Keaton pay off the officer to bring Payton back to their home. Astrid later returns home, explaining that she wanted to see another side of life, but her mother scolds her for it. Meanwhile, Skye grows disillusioned with Astrid's campaign and offers to switch tickets. Later, McAfee visits Skye at their home, where they have sex.
| 5 | 5 | "The Voter" | Ian Brennan | Ryan Murphy & Brad Falchuk & Ian Brennan | September 27, 2019 | 1BAC05 |
On the day of the election, Payton, Astrid, and their staffs all attempt to court the undecided voters, which were determined through an algorithm. One of the undecideds, Elliot Beachman, is uninterested in the election. He checks out passing women when approached by Astrid's campaign manager, punches James, and vapes through the final debate. At the debate, Skye is officially announced as Payton's new running mate, where they take shots at Astrid. Astrid announces Haitian student Pierre Toussaint as her VP, while Infinity storms in with Ricardo, announcing that Payton used her for her illness and that Astrid ran off with Ricardo and had sex with him. Payton has a one-on-one with Elliot where he attempts to gain Elliot's feel for the school. Elliot goes to vote, but when he sees Georgina arguing that the school is suppressing a student's vote, Elliot leaves without voting.
| 6 | 6 | "The Assassination of Payton Hobart" | Gwyneth Horder-Payton | Ian Brennan | September 27, 2019 | 1BAC06 |
On election day, Astrid tells Payton she's dropping out; Payton wins the election but is deprived of the satisfaction of achieving his goal. This shakes his confidence, and he fails to get any initiatives passed. Skye plans with McAfee to remove Payton from office, and Payton gets sick after eating a cupcake made by McAfee and Skye. After Infinity moves out, Dusty enlists Ricardo to kill Payton, blaming him for what has happened. Ricardo shoots Payton with a BB gun pellet dipped in possum guts, which will give Payton sepsis.
| 7 | 7 | "The Assassination of Payton Hobart: Part 2" | Gwyneth Horder-Payton | Ian Brennan & Brad Falchuk | September 27, 2019 | 1BAC07 |
The secrets behind Payton's campaign come to light, so he is forced to resign as president and Skye takes his place. It is also revealed that Harvard rescinded Payton's admission. Skye offers the VP spot to McAfee, but McAfee reveals she knows Skye poisoned Payton and has them arrested. Meanwhile, Keaton discovers Georgina's plan to run away with her ex-lover, so he writes her and Payton out of the will, per their agreement. Infinity learns of Ricardo's plan and tells the doctors, saving Payton's life. Infinity and Ricardo both converge on Dusty's home, which ends with Dusty accidentally shooting Ricardo. Ricardo agrees to tell the police everything Dusty did, including poisoning Infinity's mother, which led to her death. Meanwhile, Alice and James both leave Payton's team, while Astrid turns in her father to the FBI for wire fraud. Payton and Georgina drive to the train station, where Georgina tearfully departs.
| 8 | 8 | "Vienna" | Brad Falchuk | Brad Falchuk | September 27, 2019 | 1BAC08 |
Three years in the future, Payton attends New York University, where he rooms with James. He performs in cocktail lounges and suffers from borderline alcoholism. He is visited by Infinity and Skye, who have both reconciled with him. Meanwhile, McAfee, having graduated with a political science degree from Columbia, begins interning for state senate leader Dede Standish. Due to Standish not having an opponent for years, the campaign is not up to date. McAfee contacts James, and the pair pitch a possible run to Payton, since he can capitalize off of the poor state of the MTA. Payton is initially reluctant. He visits Alice before her wedding to another man, and later speaks to River's ghost, who convinces him to run. Payton returns to his dorm, where he is met by James, McAfee, and Skye, as well as Alice, who ran away from the altar, and Astrid, who has been working as a server. Astrid reveals that, while catering an event, she discovered that Standish is in a three-way marriage, a scandal that Payton can use to his advantage. With his team by his side, Payton declares his run for state senate, though all are unaware that Standish is secretly planning on running for Vice President of the United States.

=== Season 2 (2020) ===
| No. overall | No. in season | Title | Directed by | Written by | Original release date | Prod. code |
|---|---|---|---|---|---|---|
| 9 | 1 | "New York State of Mind" | Brad Falchuk | Ryan Murphy & Brad Falchuk & Ian Brennan | June 19, 2020 | 2BAC01 |
| 10 | 2 | "Conscious Unthroupling" | Gwyneth Horder-Payton | Brad Falchuk & Ian Brennan | June 19, 2020 | 2BAC02 |
| 11 | 3 | "Cancel Culture" | David Petrarca | Ryan Murphy & Brad Falchuk & Ian Brennan | June 19, 2020 | 2BAC03 |
| 12 | 4 | "Hail Mary" | Tamra Davis | Brad Falchuk & Ian Brennan | June 19, 2020 | 2BAC04 |
| 13 | 5 | "The Voters" | Ian Brennan | Ian Brennan | June 19, 2020 | 2BAC05 |
| 14 | 6 | "What's in the Box?" | Tina Mabry | Brad Falchuk & Ian Brennan | June 19, 2020 | 2BAC06 |
| 15 | 7 | "Election Day" | Gwyneth Horder-Payton | Ian Brennan & Brad Falchuk | June 19, 2020 | 2BAC07 |

== Production ==
=== Development ===
On February 5, 2018, it was announced that Netflix had given the production a two season order. The order came after a bidding war involving Hulu and Amazon. The series was created by Brad Falchuk, Ian Brennan and Ryan Murphy, all of whom will executive produce alongside Ben Platt. Production companies involved with the show include Fox 21 Television Studios and Ryan Murphy Television. In April 2020, Murphy confirmed that while a third and final season was planned, that they would "take a couple of years off and have Ben Platt get a little bit older for his final race" before resuming work on the series.

=== Casting ===
Alongside the initial series announcement, it was confirmed that Ben Platt would star in the series and that Barbra Streisand and Gwyneth Paltrow were in talks to join as series regulars. On July 16, 2018, it was announced that Zoey Deutch, Lucy Boynton, Laura Dreyfuss and Rahne Jones had been cast in main roles. On October 11, 2018, it was reported that Dylan McDermott had joined the cast. On November 4, 2018, Streisand revealed in an interview with The New Yorker that she had chosen to turn down the series in order to work on her album Walls, and that Jessica Lange had been cast in the role she had been eyed for instead. On December 3, 2018, McDermott announced in an interview with SiriusXM that January Jones had been cast to portray his wife in the series. In March 2019, it was announced Bette Midler and Judith Light would guest star in the series.

=== Filming ===
Principal photography for the first season took place on location in Fullerton Union High School, Orange County, California, and Los Angeles, California.

== Reception ==
=== Critical response ===
Critical response of The Politician
| Season | Rotten Tomatoes | Metacritic |
|---|---|---|
| 1 | 59% (95 reviews) | 66 (32 reviews) |
| 2 | 41% (22 reviews) | 45 (9 reviews) |

The review aggregator website Rotten Tomatoes reported a 59% approval rating for the first season with an average rating of 7.00/10, based on 95 reviews. The website's critical consensus reads: "While The Politician can't uphold all of its tantalizing promises, it delivers just enough soapy satire in a sumptuous setting to keep Ryan Murphy fans invested—though its [sic] unlikely to win him many new votes." Metacritic, which uses a weighted average, assigned the season a score of 66 out of 100, based on 32 critics, indicating "generally favorable reviews".

On Rotten Tomatoes, the second season received a 41% approval rating with an average rating of 6.10/10, based on 22 reviews. The website's critical consensus reads: "Shallow and messy, but not in a fun way, The Politician's second term expands its political horizons but doesn't seem to know what to do with them." Metacritic gave the second season a weighted average score of 45 out of 100 based on 9 reviews, indicating "mixed or average reviews".

=== Accolades ===
| Year | Award | Category | Nominee(s) | Result | Ref. |
|---|---|---|---|---|---|
| 2020 | GLAAD Media Awards | Outstanding Drama Series | The Politician | Nominated | |
| 2020 | Golden Globe Awards | Best Television Series – Musical or Comedy | The Politician | Nominated | |
| 2020 | Golden Globe Awards | Best Actor – Television Series Musical or Comedy | Ben Platt | Nominated | |
| 2020 | Primetime Emmy Awards | Outstanding Guest Actress in a Comedy Series | Bette Midler (for "Vienna") | Nominated | |
| 2020 | Primetime Emmy Awards | Outstanding Contemporary Costumes | Lou Eyrich, Claire Parkinson, Lily Parkinson and Nora Pederson (for "Pilot") | Nominated | |
| 2020 | Primetime Emmy Awards | Outstanding Contemporary Hairstyling | Chris Clark, Natalie Driscoll and Havana Prats (for "Pilot") | Nominated | |
| 2020 | Primetime Emmy Awards | Outstanding Main Title Design | Heidi Berg, Felix Soletic, Carlo Sa, Yongsub Song, Joe Paniagua and Rachel Fowler | Nominated | |
| 2020 | Primetime Emmy Awards | Outstanding Contemporary Make-up (Non-Prosthetic) | Autumn Butler, Caitlin Martini Emery, Debra Schrey and Emma Burton (for "The Assassination Of Payton Hobart") | Nominated | |
| 2021 | Primetime Emmy Awards | Outstanding Contemporary Costumes | Claire Parkinson, Lily Parkinson, James Hammer and Laura Steinmann (for "New York State of Mind") | Nominated | |
| 2021 | Primetime Emmy Awards | Outstanding Contemporary Hairstyling | Liliana Maggio, Timothy Harvey, Lisa Thomas, Josh First and Matthew Wilson (for "What's In The Box?") | Nominated | |
| 2021 | Primetime Emmy Awards | Outstanding Contemporary Makeup (Non-Prosthetic) | Sherri Berman Laurence, Nicky Pattison Illum, Charles Zambrano, Oslyn Holder and Amy Duskin (for "What's In The Box?") | Nominated | |

== See also ==
- The Politician (soundtrack)
