= Grant Ginder =

American author (born 1983)

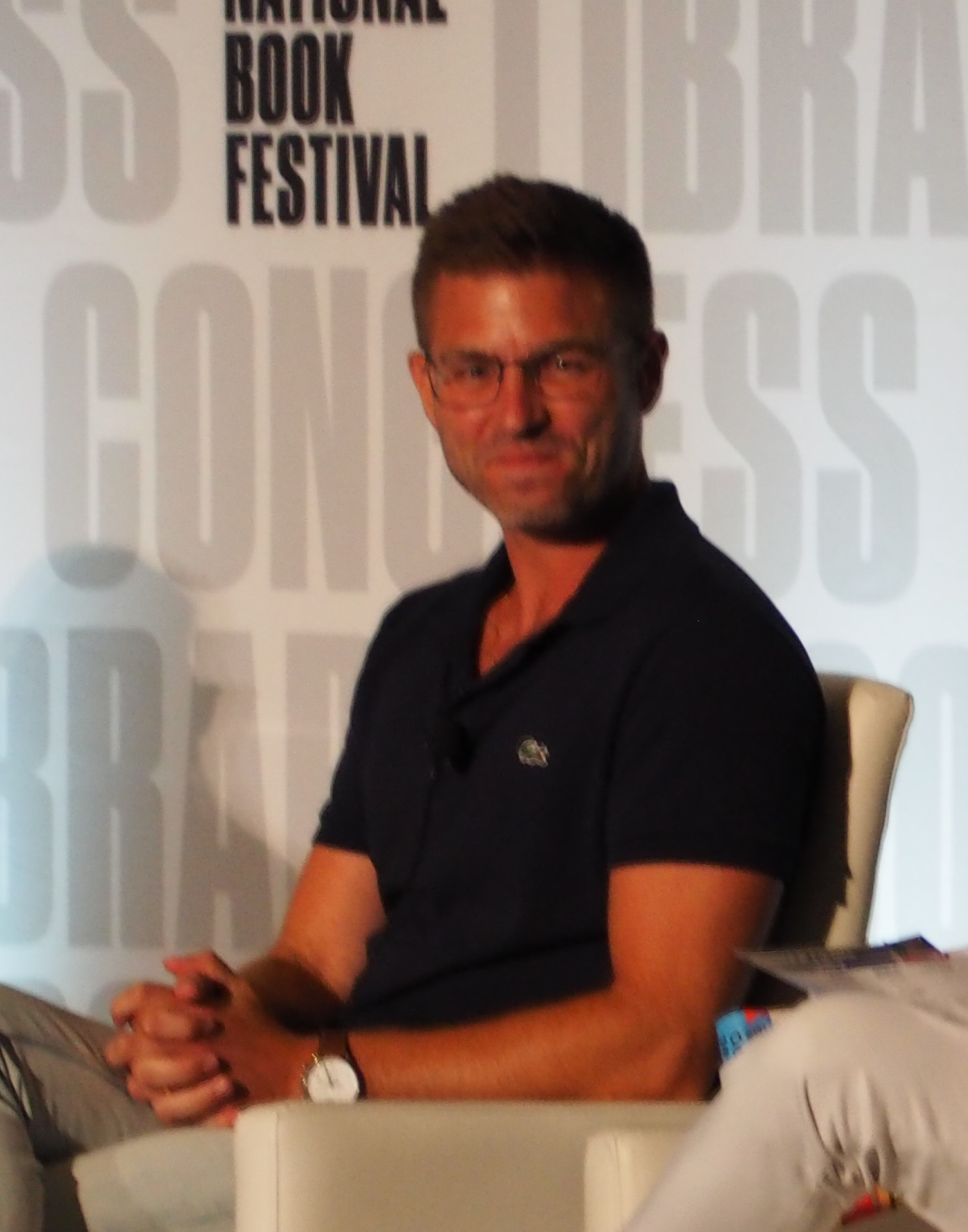
- Born: 1982 or 1983 (age 43–44)
- Education: University of Pennsylvania (BA); New York University (MFA)
- Occupation: Novelist
- Writing career
- Period: 2009–present
- Website: grantginder.wordpress.com

Grant Ginder (born 1982/1983) is an American novelist, academic, and former political aide.

== Background and education ==
Ginder grew up in Laguna Beach, California. He received a Bachelor of Arts from the University of Pennsylvania and a Master of Fine Arts from New York University. At the latter, Ginder studied under novelists Junot Díaz and Colson Whitehead.

== Career ==
While in college, Ginder worked as an intern in the offices of U.S. Representative Loretta Sanchez. Upon completing his education, Ginder served as a speechwriter for John Podesta at the Center for American Progress. In 2009, he published his first novel, This is How it Starts, a story of young government employees and interns working in Washington, D.C. Politico called the novel an examination of Washington's "power elite": "sharply observed" and "packed with sly humor."

In 2013, Ginder published the novel Driver's Education. In a starred review, the industry publication Booklist called the book, "lively, funny, gritty, and achingly real," comparing Ginder to novelists Junot Díaz and Michael Chabon. In The Boston Globe, critic Karen Campbell called the work "engaging, colorful, direct, and imaginative," and "a stirring, memorable trip." The New Yorker called the work "a sensitively observed story," about "lessons that bear repeating." As of 2026, Ginder lives in Brooklyn, and teaches writing at New York University, his alma mater.

=== Novels ===
- This Is How It Starts. Simon & Schuster. 2009. ISBN 9781416599944.
- Driver's Education. Simon & Schuster. 2013. ISBN 9781439187357.
- The People We Hate at the Wedding. Flatiron Books. 2017. ISBN 9781250095206.
- Honestly, We Meant Well. Flatiron Books. 2019. ISBN 9781250143150.
- Let's Not Do That Again. Flatiron Books. 2022. ISBN 9781250243775.
- So Old, So Young. Simon & Schuster. 2026. ISBN 9781668051771.
