= Jonah Platt =

American actor and advocate (born 1987)

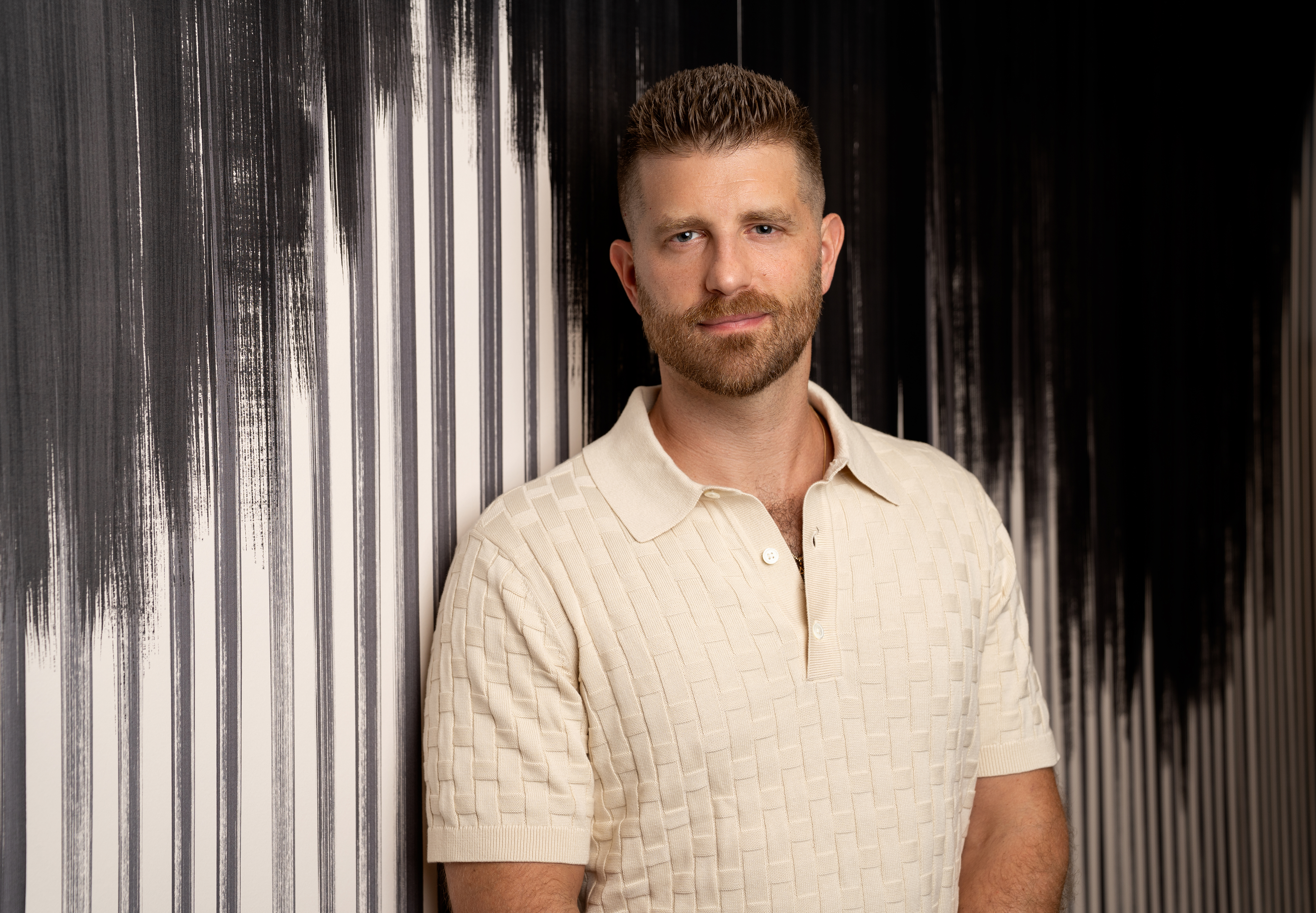
- Born: Jonah Sezzin Platt; November 17, 1986 (age 39); Los Angeles, California, U.S.
- Education: University of Pennsylvania
- Occupations: Actor; singer
- Spouse: Courtney Galiano (m. 2016)
- Children: 3
- Parent(s): Marc Platt (father); Julie Platt (mother)
- Relatives: Ben Platt (brother)
- Website: www.jonahplatt.com

Jonah Sezzin Platt (born November 17, 1986) is an American actor and singer. He has credits across stage, film and television, with his most prominent roles occurring on stage.

Since 2024, he has hosted the award-winning weekly podcast, Being Jewish with Jonah Platt, interviewing Jewish entertainers, writers, advocates, rabbis, as well as non-Jewish allies. Haaretz described it as a "top-ranked Jewish podcast".

== Early life and education ==
Platt was born in Los Angeles, one of five children of Julie and Marc Platt. His father is a film, television, and theater producer whose credits include Legally Blonde, Into the Woods, La La Land, Mary Poppins Returns, the musical Wicked, and its film adaptation. His mother has served as chair of the Board of Trustees of the Jewish Federations of North America, which oversees 146 Jewish federations across the United States and Canada. He has two sisters and two brothers, including actor Ben Platt. He and his family are Jewish.

He attended Jewish day school and sleepaway camp at Camp Ramah, affiliated with Conservative Judaism. He also participated in Birthright Israel, a free ten-day trip to Israel for young Jewish adults between the ages of 18 and 26.

He attended Harvard-Westlake School, an independent school in Los Angeles. In 2008, he graduated from the University of Pennsylvania School of Arts and Sciences with a B.A. in English with minors in Cinema Studies and Music.

He is currently pursuing his Master's in Antisemitism Studies at Gratz College.

== Career ==
=== Advocacy ===
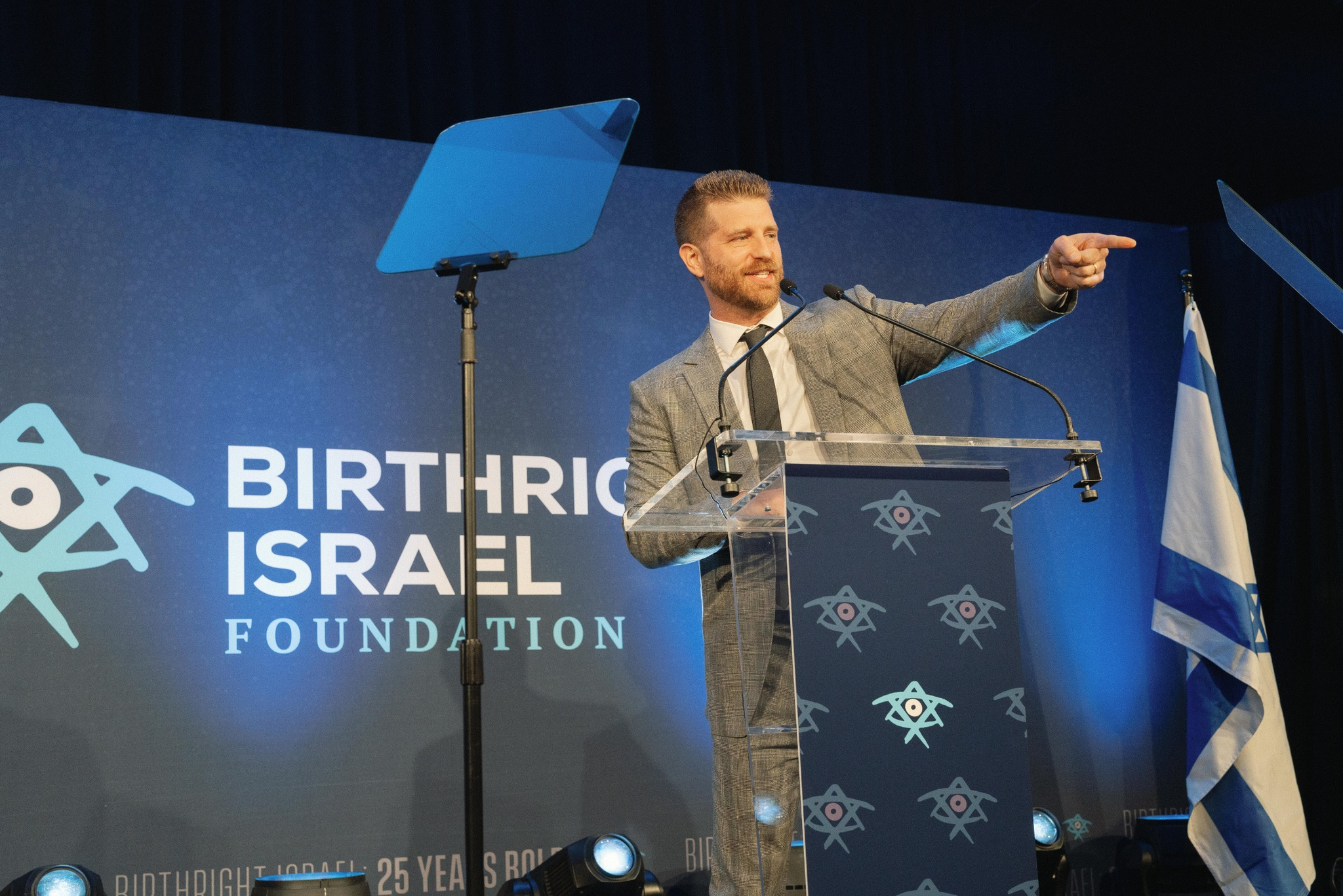
Jonah Platt at a Birthright Israel Event

In October 2023, Platt contributed a column to Variety as part of Variety's Antisemitism and Hollywood package. Platt's column advocated for more joyful Jewish narratives being told on screen.

In January 2024, he joined Julianna Margulies, David Schwimmer and Debra Messing in signing an open letter addressed to the Academy of Motion Picture Arts and Sciences, demanding it include Jews in its representation and inclusion standards.

In September 2025, he joined Messing, Liev Schreiber, Mayim Bialik and Gene Simmons in signing a letter rejecting a boycott of the Israeli film industry.

Platt sits on the board of One Mitzvah A Day, The 8 Project, American Jewish University's Maas Center, The Inheritance Theater Project, and is an associate of Hen Mazzig's Tel Aviv Institute.

Platt partners with organizations across the US as a keynote speaker. He has also appeared as an expert on networks such as CNN.

==== Podcast ====
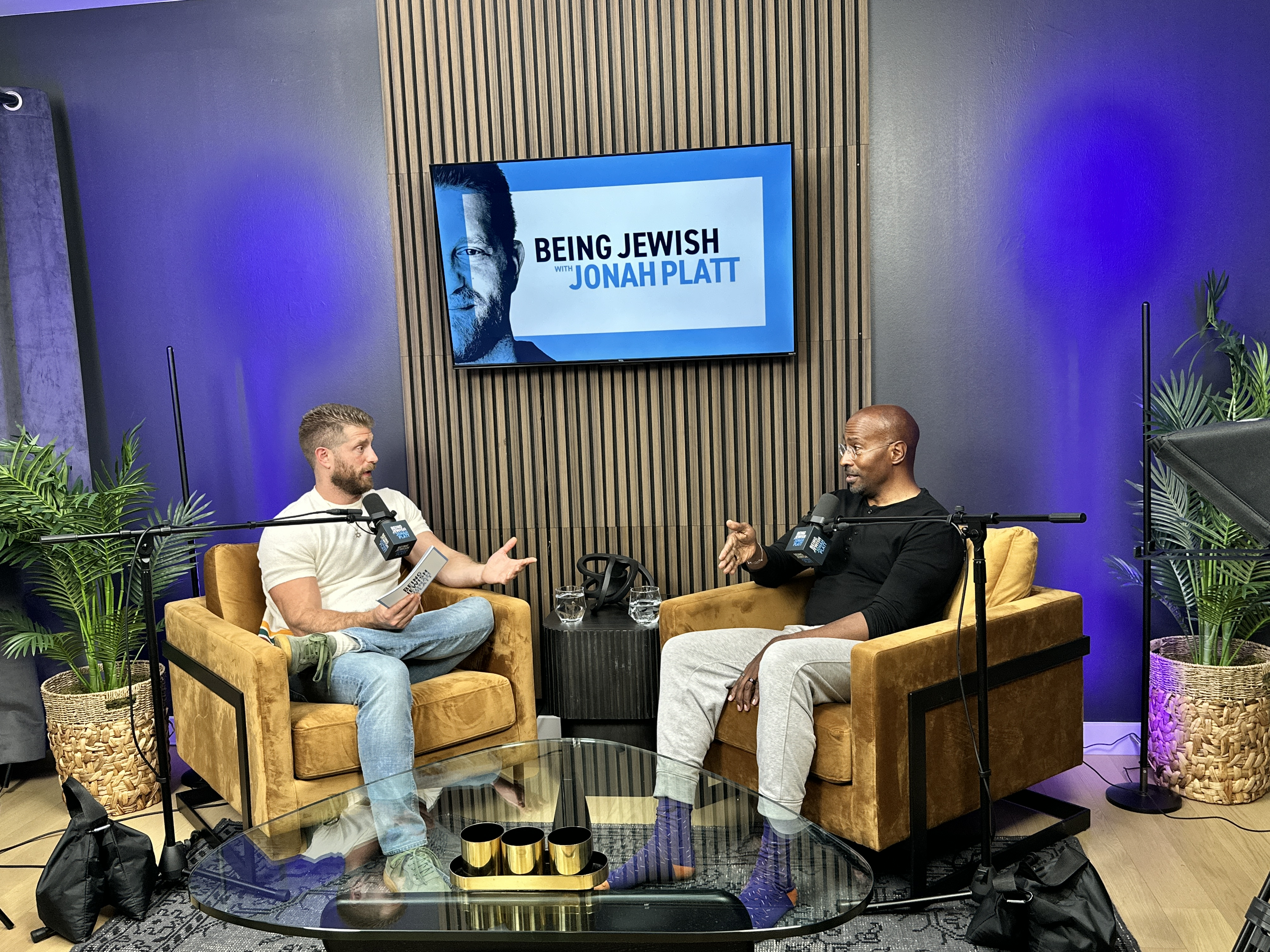
Jonah Platt on Being Jewish with Jonah Platt Podcast

In October 2024, he started the podcast, Being Jewish with Jonah Platt. His guests have included actor Skylar Astin, singer and activist Montana Tucker, Rabbi David Wolpe, writer Sarah Hurwitz, comedian Tiffany Haddish, actress Ginnifer Goodwin, actor Josh Gad, news commentator, Van Jones, newscaster Jake Tapper, food expert and author Gail Simmons, and matchmaker Aleeza Ben Shalom. Guests have also included Rabbi Angela Buchdahl, writer Dara Horn, basketball coach Bruce Pearl, actress Patricia Heaton, comedian David Baddiel, activist Noa Tishby and actor Jason Alexander.

==== Awards ====
In late 2024, California's 51st State Assembly district recognized him with a Community Excellence Award for Combating Antisemitism.

In 2025, he was awarded multiple accolades for his podcast, including honoree of Best Indie Podcast by the Webby Awards and the Religion Communicators Council Wilbur Award for Excellence in the category of Audio Productions – Extended Length. The show is also a 2025 W3 Award winner for Best Host.

In October 2025, he received the Holocaust Museum of LA's inaugural Roz & Abner Goldstine Advocacy Award.

In November 2025, American Friends of ELEM (a non-profit supporting Israeli youth at risk) honored Platt with the Lifesaver Award at the Ray Of Hope Benefit in Manhattan.

=== Stage ===
In 2013, he starred in the Los Angeles revival of the musical comedy, Bare: A Pop Opera.

In 2014, he starred as Wolf alongside Kristen Bell and Sarah Hyland in a Hollywood Bowl production of the musical, Hair. In the same year he starred as Homer in La Mirada's theatre revival of Floyd Collins. The production went on to win Best Production of a Musical (Large Theater) at the 2014 Ovation Awards.

In 2015, he made his Broadway theatre debut in Wicked, playing Fiyero.

In 2017, he played the Beast in Beauty and the Beast — A Christmas Rose, a production in Pasadena in the style of a British pantomime.

In the same year, he directed a production of Bert V. Royal's Dog Sees God: Confessions of a Teenage Blockhead. The production ran for six sold-out shows at the Blank Theater as part of the Hollywood Fringe Festival. It was partly funded by the Jewish Federation of Greater Los Angeles, with 15% of proceeds going towards the GSA Network.

In 2018, he starred as Marty Kantrowitz in the musical stage adaptation of the 1999 film, A Walk on the Moon. Platt performed at the American Conservatory Theater in San Francisco.

In 2019, he directed Carrie Manolakos and an all-star cast in a reading of the play Irena at Temple Emanuel in Beverly Hills. The story is based on the life of Irena Sendler, a Polish social worker who rescued more than 2,500 Jewish children from the Warsaw Ghetto during the Second World War.

In 2020, he starred as Davy Rothbart in the musical Found, directed by Moritz von Stuelpnagel. The production at the Los Angeles Theatre Center is based on a collection of stories written Rothbart, drawn from discarded notes and letters.

In 2023, he starred in a workshop of The Heart of Rock and Roll, directed by Gordon Greenberg.

Later in 2023, he starred alongside Bella Heathcote in Samuel Baum's play The Engagement Party at the Geffen Playhouse.

Platt is co-writing the musical adaptation of Lois Lowry's bestselling novel, The Giver.

=== Music ===
He has performed with his brothers, Ben Platt and Henry as "The Platt Brothers". He has also performed as a soloist and in duet with Ben.

=== Film ===
In 2021, he had a minor role in Aaron Sorkin's drama, Being the Ricardos, which also starred Nicole Kidman. The following year he starred in the Hulu Hannukah movie, Menorah in the Middle, alongside Lucy DeVito.

Platt is currently producing his first feature film, The Mensch, in which he will co-produce and star alongside Ginnifer Goodwin.

== Personal life ==
In 2016, he married Courtney Galiano in a Jewish ceremony officiated by Rabbi David Wolpe. The couple have three children together. His wife converted to Judaism and he is an Advisory Board Member for the American Jewish University's Miller Intro to Judaism Program.

Platt blesses each of his children at the Shabbat table every Friday, a practice he has maintained since each child was born. In 2026, he began hosting Shabbat lunches and regularly reading the weekly Torah portion.

In 2025, Platt revealed that he had received an adult diagnosis for ADHD.

== Acting credits ==
=== Theater ===
Year	Production	Role	Venue	Notes
2013	Bare: A Pop Opera	Jason McConnell	Hayworth Theatre	Los Angeles
2014	Hair	Woof	Hollywood Bowl	Los Angeles
2014	Floyd Collins	Homer	La Mirada Theatre for the Performing Arts	La Mirada, California
2015	Wicked	Fiyero	Gershwin Theatre	Broadway
2017	Beauty and the Beast — A Christmas Rose	The Beast	Pasadena Convention Center	Pasadena
2018	NASSIM	Performer	Barrow Street Theatre	New York
2018	A Walk on the Moon	Marty Kantrowitz	American Conservatory Theater	San Francisco
2020	Found	Davy Rothbart	Los Angeles Theatre Center	Los Angeles
2023	The Engagement Party	Josh	Geffen Playhouse	Los Angeles

=== Film ===
Year	Title	Role	Notes
2018	I'll Be Watching	Lieutenant Jack Rivers	
2018	The Last Breakfast Club	Bender	
2021	Pompo: The Cinéphile	Alan	
2021	Being the Ricardos	Tip Tribby	
2022	Menorah in the Middle	Ben	
2023	The List	Matt	
2024	Spread	Orson	
TBA	The Mensch	TBA	In development

=== Television ===
Year	Title	Role	Notes
2013	The Office	Frat Boy	Episode: "Finale"
2015	Parenthood	ICU Doctor	Episode: "How Did We Get Here"
2017	Curb Your Enthusiasm	Husband #4	Episode: "Fatwa!"
2018	Jesus Christ Superstar Live in Concert	Ensemble	Television special
2018–2019	Trolls: The Beat Goes On!	Milton Moss (voice)	7 episodes
2019	A Million Little Things	Singer	Episode: "The Rosary:
2020	Harley Quinn	Singing Clayface	Episode: "Something Borrowed, Something Green"
2021	Country Comfort	Lucas Presley	Episode: "Bless the Broken Road"
2022	Uncoupled	Horst	2 episodes: "Chapter 2", "Chapter 7"
2024	Mighty MonsterWheelies	Drillbert (voice)	Episode: "Rock, Rock. Who's there?"
2024	Universal Basic Guys	Interrogator/Paul	2 episodes: "Jaws of Life", "Fight or Flight"
