= Menorah in the Middle =

- Directed by: Jordan Kessler
- Starring: Lucy DeVito; Jonah Platt
- Release date: November 4, 2022 (Hulu)
- Running time: 90 minutes
- Country: United States
- Language: English

Menorah in the Middle is a 2022 American romantic comedy film directed by Jordan Kessler and starring Lucy DeVito and Jonah Platt.

== Cast ==
- Lucy DeVito as Sarah Becker
- Jonah Platt as Ben
- Cristián de la Fuente as Chad
- Laura Silverman as Becky Baum
- Sarah Silverman as Rachel Baum
- Gina Hecht as Linda
- Adam Busch as Jacob
- Bruce Nozick as Frank
- Tristan Cunningham as Juggler
- Leila Weisberg as Crafty

== Release ==
The film was released on Hulu on November 4, 2022.

== Reception ==
Barbara Shulgasser-Parker of Common Sense Media awarded the film two stars out of five.
