= Alan Dershowitz =

American lawyer and author (born 1938)

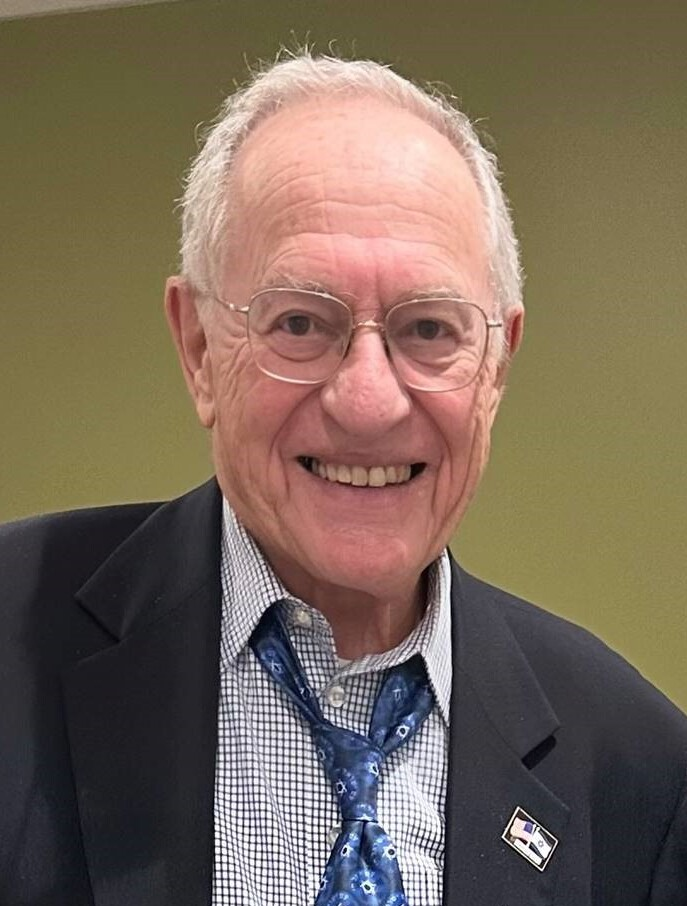
- Dershowitz in 2024
- Born: Alan Morton Dershowitz; September 1, 1938 (age 88); New York City, U.S.
- Education: Brooklyn College (BA); Yale University (LLB)
- Occupations: Attorney; law professor
- Political party: Democratic (1959–2024); Independent (2024–2026); Republican (2026–present)
- Spouses: Sue Barlach (m. 1959; div. 1976); Carolyn Cohen (m. 1986)
- Children: 3 (including Elon)
- Website: dersh.substack.com

Alan Morton Dershowitz (/ˈdɜːrʃəwɪts/ DUR-shə-wits; born September 1, 1938) is an American lawyer and law professor known for his work in U.S. constitutional and criminal law. From 1964 to 2013, he taught at Harvard Law School, where he was appointed as the Felix Frankfurter Professor of Law in 1993. Dershowitz is a regular media contributor, political commentator, and legal analyst.

Dershowitz has taken on high-profile and often unpopular causes and clients. As of 2009, he had won 13 of the 15 murder and attempted murder cases he handled as a criminal appellate lawyer. Dershowitz has represented such celebrity clients as Mike Tyson, Patty Hearst, Leona Helmsley, Julian Assange, and Jim Bakker. Major legal victories have included two successful appeals that overturned convictions, first for Harry Reems in 1976, then in 1984 for Claus von Bülow, who had been convicted of the attempted murder of his wife, Sunny. In 1995, Dershowitz served as the appellate adviser on the murder trial of O. J. Simpson as part of the legal "Dream Team" alongside Johnnie Cochran and F. Lee Bailey. He was a member of Harvey Weinstein's defense team in 2018 and of President Donald Trump's defense team in his first impeachment trial in 2020. He was a member of Jeffrey Epstein's defense team and helped to negotiate a controversial non-prosecution agreement on Epstein's behalf.

Dershowitz is the author of several books about politics and the law, including Reversal of Fortune: Inside the von Bülow Case (1985), the basis of the 1990 film; Chutzpah (1991); Reasonable Doubts: The Criminal Justice System and the O. J. Simpson Case (1996); The Case for Israel (2003); and The Case for Peace (2005). His two most recent works are The Case Against Impeaching Trump (2018) and Guilt by Accusation: The Challenge of Proving Innocence in the Age of #MeToo (2019). An ardent supporter of Israel, he has written several books on the Arab–Israeli conflict.

== Early life and education ==
Dershowitz was born in Williamsburg, Brooklyn, on September 1, 1938, the son of Claire (née Ringel) and Harry Dershowitz, an Orthodox Jewish couple. He was raised in Borough Park. His father was a founder and president of the Young Israel of Boro Park Synagogue in the 1960s, served on the board of directors of the Etz Chaim School in Borough Park, and, in retirement, was co-owner of the Manhattan-based Merit Sales Company. Dershowitz's first job was at a deli factory on Manhattan's Lower East Side in 1952, at age 14.

Dershowitz attended the Brooklyn Talmudical Academy, then the Brooklyn branch of Yeshiva University High School, from which he graduated in 1955. He played on its basketball team. He was a rebellious student, often criticized by his teachers. He later said his teachers told him to do something that "requires a big mouth and no brain ... so I became a lawyer". After graduating from high school, he studied political science at Brooklyn College, graduating in 1959 with a Bachelor of Arts, magna cum laude. He then attended Yale Law School, where he became the editor-in-chief of The Yale Law Journal. He graduated in 1962 ranked first in his class with a Bachelor of Laws. In 1997 he was a member of a Conservative minyan at Harvard Hillel but was a secular Jew.

== Legal and teaching career ==
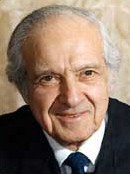
After law school, Dershowitz clerked for Judge David L. Bazelon (pictured), whom he has described as one of his most influential mentors.

After graduating from law school, Dershowitz was a law clerk for Chief Judge David L. Bazelon of the U.S. Court of Appeals for the District of Columbia Circuit from 1962 to 1963. Dershowitz described Bazelon as an influential mentor. He has said, "Bazelon was my best and worst boss at once.... He worked me to the bone; he didn't hesitate to call at 2 a.m. He taught me everything—how to be a civil libertarian, a Jewish activist, a mensch. He was halfway between a slave master and a father figure." From 1963 to 1964 Dershowitz clerked for the Justice Arthur Goldberg of the U.S. Supreme Court.

Dershowitz told Tom Van Riper of Forbes that getting a Supreme Court clerkship was probably his second big break. His first was at age 14 or 15, when a camp counselor told him he was smart but that his mind operated a little differently. He joined the Harvard Law School faculty as an assistant professor in 1964, and was made a full professor in 1967 at age 28, at that time the youngest full professor of law in the school's history. He was appointed as the Felix Frankfurter Professor of Law in 1993. Dershowitz retired from teaching at Harvard Law in 2013. He is a Distinguished Senior Fellow at the Gatestone Institute. Throughout his tenure at Harvard, Dershowitz maintained his legal practice in both criminal and civil law.

=== Notable clients ===
Dershowitz's clients have included such high-profile figures as Patty Hearst, Leona Helmsley, Jim Bakker, Mike Tyson, Michael Milken, O. J. Simpson, Kirtanananda Swami, Jeffrey Epstein, and Donald Trump.

==== Harry Reems (1976) ====
In 1976, Dershowitz handled the successful appeal of Harry Reems, who had been convicted of distribution of obscenity resulting from acting in the pornographic movie Deep Throat. Dershowitz argued against censorship of pornography on First Amendment grounds and maintained that consumption of pornography was not harmful.

==== Claus von Bülow (1984) ====
In one of his first high-profile cases, Dershowitz represented Claus von Bülow, a British socialite, on appeal for the attempted murder of his wife, Sunny von Bülow, who went into a coma in Newport, Rhode Island, in 1980 (and later died in 2008). He succeeded in having the conviction overturned, and von Bülow was acquitted in a retrial. Dershowitz told the story of the case in his book Reversal of Fortune: Inside the von Bülow case (1985), which was adapted into a movie in 1990. Dershowitz was played by actor Ron Silver, and Dershowitz himself had a cameo as a judge.

In his book Taking the Stand, Dershowitz recounts that von Bülow had a dinner party after he was found not guilty at his retrial. Dershowitz told him that he would not attend if it was a "victory party," and von Bülow assured him that it was only a dinner for "several interesting friends." Norman Mailer attended the dinner where, among other things, Dershowitz explained why the evidence pointed to von Bülow's innocence. Dershowitz described Mailer grabbing his wife's arm and saying: "Let's get out of here. I think this guy is innocent. I thought we were going to be having dinner with a man who actually tried to kill his wife. This is boring."

==== Avi Weiss (1989) ====
In 1989, Dershowitz filed a defamation suit against Cardinal Józef Glemp, then Archbishop of Warsaw, on behalf of Rabbi Avi Weiss. That summer, Weiss and six other members of New York's Jewish community had staged a protest at the Auschwitz concentration camp over the presence of a controversial convent of Carmelite nuns. Weiss and the protesters were ejected after attempting to scale a wall surrounding the convent. In an August 1989 speech, Glemp referenced the incident and ascribed a violent intent to the protesters, saying, "Recently, a squad of seven Jews from New York launched an attack on the convent at Oswiecim [Auschwitz]. They did not kill the nuns or destroy the convent only because they were stopped." In the same speech, Glemp made antisemitic remarks suggesting that Jews control the news media. The lawsuit centered on these statements. His account of the lawsuit appears in his 1991 book Chutzpah.

==== Kirtanananda Swami (1990) ====
In 1990, the federal government indicted Kīrtanānanda Swami on five counts of racketeering, six counts of mail fraud, and conspiracy to murder two of his opponents in the Hare Krishna movement (Stephen Bryant and Charles St. Denis). The government claimed that Kīrtanānanda had illegally amassed a profit of more than $10.5 million over four years. It also charged that he ordered the killings because the victims had threatened to reveal his sexual abuse of minors.

On March 29, 1991, Kīrtanānanda was convicted on nine of the 11 charges (the jury failed to reach a verdict on the murder charges), but the Court of Appeals was convinced by Dershowitz's defense and threw out the convictions, saying that child molestation evidence had unfairly prejudiced the jury against Kīrtanānanda, who was not charged with those crimes.

==== O. J. Simpson (1995) ====
During the murder trial of O. J. Simpson, Dershowitz acted as an appellate adviser to Simpson's defense team, and later wrote a book about it, Reasonable Doubts: The Criminal Justice System and the O. J. Simpson Case (1996). Dershowitz wrote: "the Simpson case will not be remembered in the next century. It will not rank as one of the trials of the century. It will not rank with the Nuremberg trials, the Rosenberg trial, Sacco and Vanzetti. It is on par with Leopold and Loeb and the Lindbergh case, all involving celebrities. It is also not one of the most important cases of my own career. I would rank it somewhere in the middle in terms of interest and importance." The case has been described as the most publicized criminal trial in American history.

==== Jeffrey Epstein (2008) ====
Dershowitz was a member of the legal defense team for the first criminal case against Jeffrey Epstein, who was investigated after accusations that he had repeatedly solicited sex from minors. Dershowitz had previously befriended Epstein through their mutual acquaintance Lynn Forester de Rothschild.

In 2006, Dershowitz was involved in efforts to discredit Epstein's young accusers.

The first investigation into Epstein concluded with a controversial non-prosecution agreement that Dershowitz helped negotiate; in June 2008, Epstein pleaded guilty to a state charge of procuring for prostitution a girl under age 18 and was sentenced to 18 months in prison. The agreement had been approved by Alexander Acosta, then the United States Attorney for the Southern District of Florida. In February 2019, Judge Kenneth Marra ruled that federal prosecutors had violated the Crime Victims' Rights Act by concluding the agreement without notifying Epstein's victims. In 2021 the Eleventh Circuit, sitting en banc, denied a victim's petition asserting that prosecutors had violated her rights under the Act, holding that it provides no judicial remedy before formal charges are filed.

In 2018 Dershowitz claimed to have broken off social contact with Epstein while still giving him legal advice.

In April 2019, Epstein victim Virginia Giuffre filed a federal civil defamation lawsuit against Dershowitz in New York. It was dismissed on November 8, 2022, and no fees were awarded to either side.

In 2025, Dershowitz said he was aware of the names associated with the Epstein list but was bound by confidentiality. It was reported that he had contributed a mocked-up fictional excerpt from Vanity Fair magazine to Jeffrey Epstein's 2003 birthday book. According to Bloomberg, Epstein gave Dershowitz's wife a new Lexus as a gift. Dershowitz said this was part of his legal fee, as his wife would drive Epstein around.

In April 2019, Dershowitz sent a letter urging the Pulitzer Prize judges not to reward the Miami Herald investigation by Julie K. Brown that had reopened the Epstein case, calling it "fake news". Brown's reporting was not a finalist that year. Lee Ann Colacioppo, editor of The Denver Post, who led one of the juries that vetted entries in the categories the Herald was thought to be a contender in, said there were "no outside pressures" on the decision, attributing the result to strong entries from other news organizations. In 2026, Brown was awarded a Pulitzer Prize special citation for the reporting.

==== Julian Assange (2011) ====
In 2011, Dershowitz served as a consultant for Julian Assange's legal team while Assange was facing the prospect of charges from the U.S. government for distributing classified documents through WikiLeaks. Of his decision to engage with Assange's team, Dershowitz said that Assange should be considered a journalist, adding, "I believe that to protect the First Amendment we need to protect new electronic media vigorously".

==== Harvey Weinstein (2018) ====
In May 2018, Dershowitz joined Harvey Weinstein's legal team as a consultant for Weinstein's lawyer Benjamin Brafman. Dershowitz advised the team on obtaining documents from The Weinstein Company related to the sexual abuse allegations against Weinstein.

==== Donald Trump (2020) ====
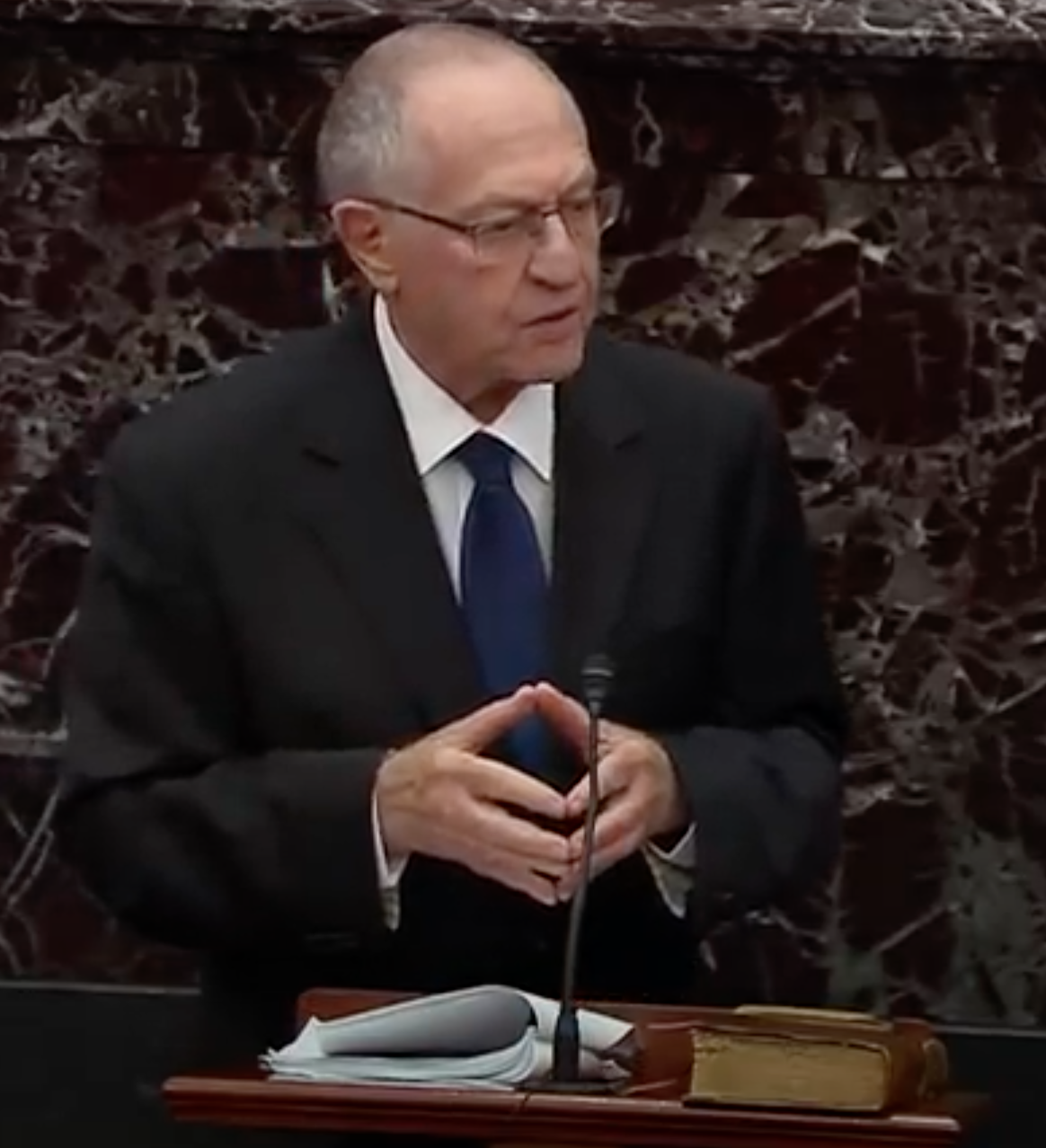
Dershowitz arguing on the Senate floor during the impeachment of Donald Trump

In January 2020, Dershowitz joined President Donald Trump's legal team as Trump was being tried on impeachment charges in the Senate. Dershowitz's addition to the team was notable, as commentators pointed out that he was a Hillary Clinton supporter and had offered occasionally controversial television defenses of Trump in the preceding two years. The statement announcing Dershowitz's joining the team said that Dershowitz was "nonpartisan when it comes to the Constitution." Dershowitz said he would not accept any compensation, and if he was paid anything, he would donate it to charity. He defended his representation of Trump, which was controversial among Trump critics, saying, "I'm there to try to defend the integrity of the constitution. That benefits President Trump in this case." Dershowitz said that his role would be limited to presenting oral arguments before the Senate opposing impeachment.

In his oral arguments, Dershowitz said that proof of a crime is required to impeach a president. Some commentators suggested that his position contradicted his statements during the impeachment of Bill Clinton, when he said no proof of a crime was required. Dershowitz later retracted his statements made during the Clinton era, saying, "To the extent there are inconsistencies between my current position and what I said 22 years ago, I am correct today .... During the Clinton impeachment, the issue was not whether a technical crime was required, because he was charged with perjury."

Some of his comments were considered to represent an overly expansive view of executive power. He argued, "If a president does something which he believes will help him get elected in the public interest, that cannot be the kind of quid pro quo that results in impeachment." Dershowitz later said his comment was mischaracterized: "a president seeking reelection cannot do anything he wants. He is not above the law. He cannot commit crimes." In 2020, Dershowitz sued CNN for alleged mischaracterization of his comments amounting to defamation. He set up a legal defense fund to cover his expenses in the lawsuit and, in 2022, CNN asked the court to force the fund to disclose its donors. Later in the year the court ordered the disclosure. The judge ruled against Dershowitz on the defamation issue in 2023. In June 2026, the Supreme Court refused to revive the suit.

After the trial, Dershowitz used his ties with the Trump administration to lobby it to give clemency to his various other clients. He played a role in at least 12 clemency grants, as well as unsuccessfully lobbying the administration to commute the 10-year sentence of George Nader, who had pleaded guilty to child pornography and sex trafficking.

== Political views, writings, and commentary ==
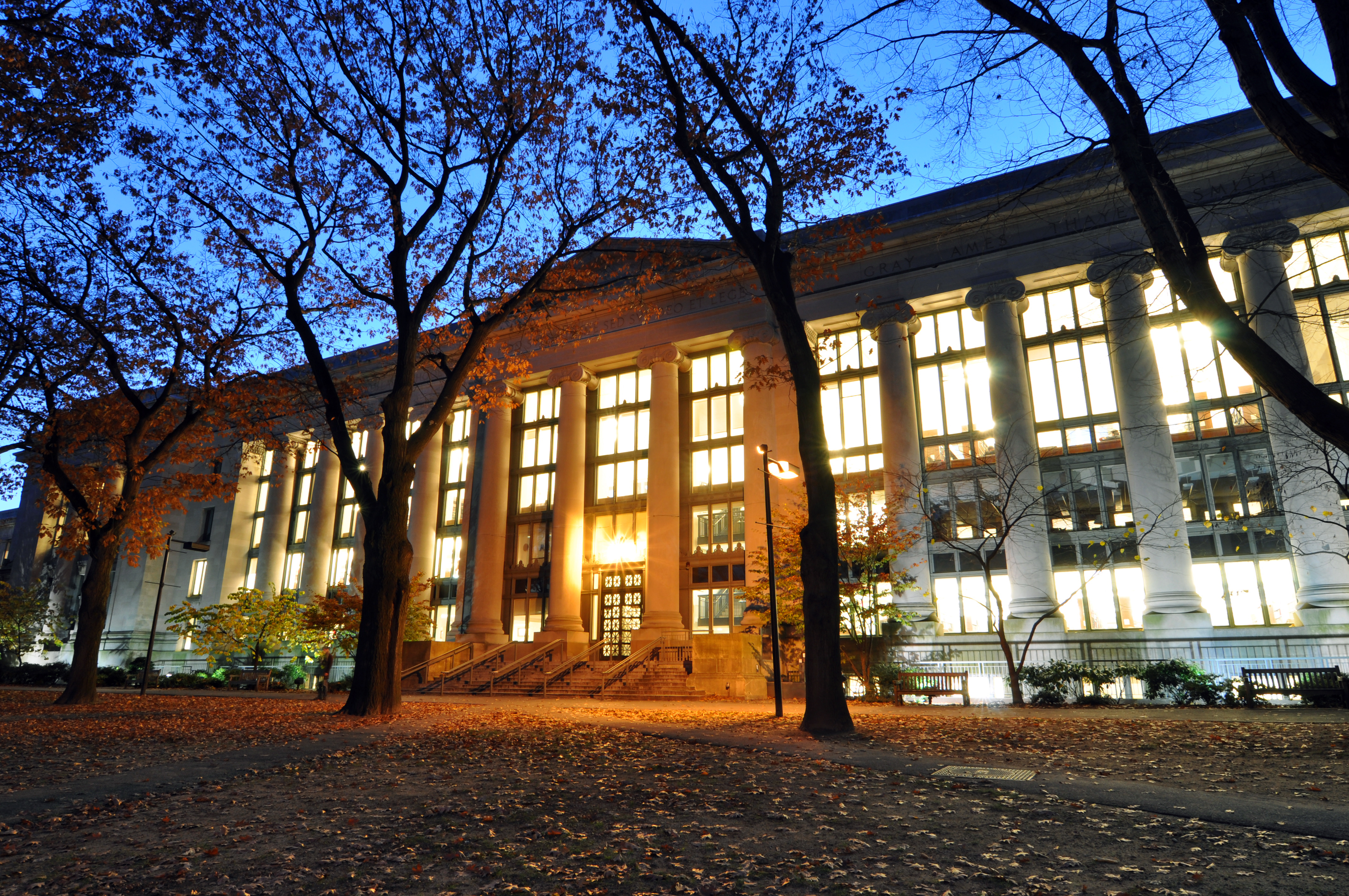
Dershowitz taught at Harvard Law School for nearly five decades, where he became the youngest tenured professor in the school's history.

=== Politics ===
Dershowitz first registered as a member of the Democratic Party in 1959. In September 2024, he renounced the party and became an independent, citing several "anti-Jewish" lawmakers in the party and the 2024 Democratic National Convention, at which Vice President Kamala Harris became the party's presidential nominee. In 2016, he said that if Keith Ellison were appointed party chair, he would leave the party; Tom Perez was appointed instead. Dershowitz endorsed Hillary Clinton in the 2008 presidential election, and later endorsed the nominee, Barack Obama. He opposed the impeachment of Bill Clinton and said he voted for Hillary Clinton in the 2016 presidential election. Dershowitz campaigned against Trump during the 2016 election and has been critical of many of his actions, including his travel ban, his rescission of protections for "Dreamers", and his failure to single out white nationalists for their provocations during protests in Charlottesville. Comparing Trump unfavorably to Hillary Clinton in October 2016, Dershowitz said, "I think there's no comparison between who has engaged in more corruption and who is more likely to continue that if elected President of the United States."

On April 20, 2026, Dershowitz published an opinion piece in The Wall Street Journal saying he had registered as a Republican.

=== Israel and the Middle East ===
Dershowitz is a strong supporter of Israel. He identifies as both "pro-Israel and pro-Palestine", writing, "I want to see a vibrant, democratic, economically viable, peaceful Palestinian state existing side by side with Israel." He has said, "were I an Israeli, I'd be a person of the left and voting the left". He also criticized President Obama's foreign policy stance toward Israel after the U.S. abstained from voting on United Nations Security Council Resolution 2334, which condemned Israel for building Israeli settlements in the occupied Palestinian territories. He has said, "I will not be a member of a party that represents itself through a chairman like Keith Ellison and through policies like that espoused by John Kerry and Barack Obama."

Dershowitz had a contract to provide advice to Joey Allaham, a lobbyist working for the Qatari government. In January 2018, Dershowitz questioned claims that Qatar funds terrorist groups, including Hamas, which is designated as a terrorist organization by several countries, including Israel, the U.S., and the European Union. Dershowitz wrote, "Qatar is quickly becoming the Israel of the Gulf States, surrounded by enemies, subject to boycotts and unrealistic demands, and struggling for its survival."

Dershowitz has engaged in public debates with several other commentators, including Meir Kahane, Noam Chomsky, and Norman Finkelstein. After former U.S. President Jimmy Carter published his book Palestine: Peace Not Apartheid (2006)—which argues that Israel's control of Palestinian land is the primary obstacle to peace—Dershowitz challenged Carter to a debate at Brandeis University. Carter declined, saying: "I don't want to have a conversation even indirectly with Dershowitz. There is no need to debate somebody who, in my opinion, knows nothing about the situation in Palestine." Carter did address Brandeis in January 2007, but only Brandeis students and staff were allowed to attend. Dershowitz was invited to respond on the same stage only after Carter had left.

In April 2009, Dershowitz took part in the Doha Debates at Georgetown University, where he spoke against the motion "this House believes it's time for the US to get tough on Israel" with Dore Gold, President of the Jerusalem Center for Public Affairs. Speakers for the motion were Avraham Burg, former chair of the Jewish Agency for Israel and former Speaker of the Knesset; and Michael Scheuer, former chief of the CIA Bin Laden Issue Station. Dershowitz's side lost the debate, with 63% of the audience voting for the motion.

In 2006, Dershowitz argued for the prosecution of Iranian president Mahmoud Ahmedinejad for incitement to genocide based on his threat of "wiping Israel off the map". His 2015 book The Case Against the Iran Deal argues that the Supreme Leader of Iran, Ali Khamenei, had urged the Iranian military "to have two nuclear bombs ready to go off in January 2005 or you're not Muslims". On February 29, 2012, Dershowitz filed an amicus brief in support of delisting the People's Mujahedin of Iran (MEK) from the US State Department list of Foreign Terrorist Organizations.

Of civilian casualties, Dershowitz has said, "In the age of terrorism, when militants don't wear uniforms, don't belong to regular armies, and easily blend into civilian populations", civilian casualties should be reexamined in terms of a "continuum of civilianality". In one example, he writes: "There is a vast difference—both moral and legal—between a 2-year-old who is killed by an enemy rocket and a 30-year-old civilian who has allowed his house to be used to store Katyusha rockets."

After Hamas's 7 October attacks in Israel, Dershowitz praised the country's military response. He often writes about the war in his newsletter.

In a May 2025 interview with The Jewish Press, Dershowitz was criticized for statements he had made about Palestine and the Gaza genocide. He had said that "Palestinians have waived their right to resistance or a state" and that "Israeli military had to do a cost-benefit analysis [when attacking hospitals and killing civilians in hopes of killing Hamas]".

==== Harvard–MIT divestment petition ====
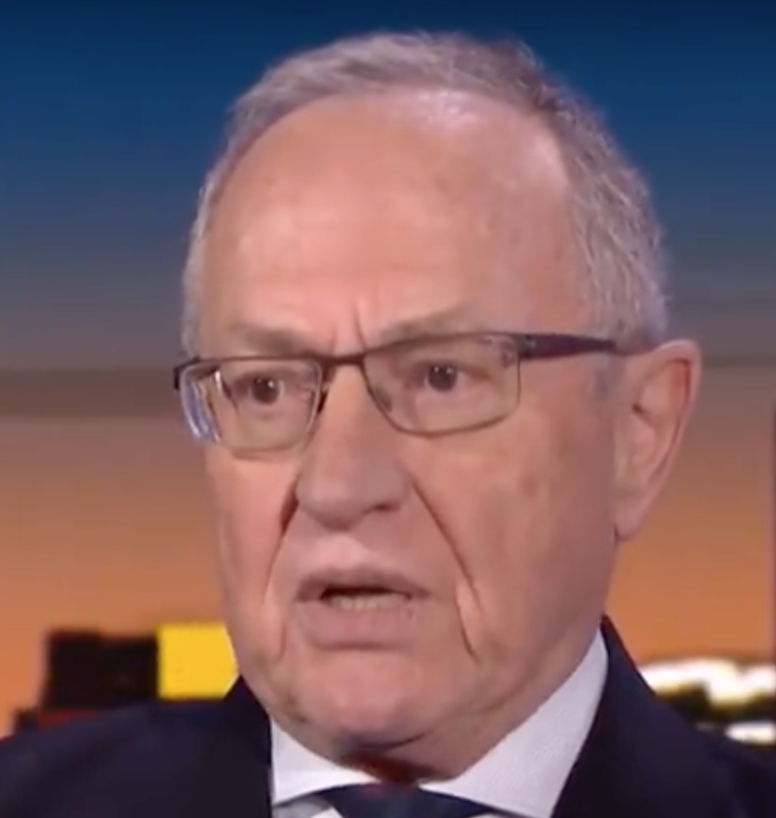
Dershowitz in 2018

Randall Adams of The Harvard Crimson wrote that, in the spring of 2002, a petition calling for Harvard and MIT to divest from Israeli and American companies that sell arms to Israel gathered over 600 signatures, including 74 from Harvard faculty and 56 from MIT faculty. Among the signatories was Harvard's Winthrop House Master Paul D. Hanson, in response to which Dershowitz staged a debate for 200 students in the Winthrop Junior Common Room. He called the petition's signatories antisemitic bigots and said they knew nothing about the Middle East. "Your House master is a bigot", he told the students, "and you ought to know that." Adams wrote that Dershowitz cited examples of human rights violations in countries that the U.S. supports, such as the execution of homosexuals in Egypt and the repression of women in Saudi Arabia, and said he would sue any professor who voted against the tenure of another academic because of the candidate's position on Israel, calling them "ignoramuses with PhDs".

=== Second Amendment and gun control ===
Dershowitz is a strong supporter of gun control. He has criticized the Second Amendment to the United States Constitution, saying that it has "no place in modern society". Dershowitz supports repealing the amendment, but vigorously opposes using the judicial system to read it out of the Constitution because that would open the way for further revisions to the Bill of Rights and Constitution by the courts, saying, "Foolish liberals who are trying to read the Second Amendment out of the Constitution by claiming it's not an individual right or that it's too much of a public safety hazard don't see the danger in the big picture. They're courting disaster by encouraging others to use the same means to eliminate portions of the Constitution they don't like."

=== Takings Clause ===
Dershowitz took on a case of a 1% shareholder of the TransPerfect company and argued that the Takings Clause of the Fifth Amendment and Due Process under both the Fifth and Fourteenth Amendments apply to individuals even in a corporate issue. He was an attorney for defendant Shirley Shawe and sought to take the case of the Delaware Chancery's forced sale of TransPerfect away from its shareholders to the Supreme Court. Dershowitz has argued that the Delaware Chancery Court violated the personal rights of an individual shareholder when it ordered the public auction on the company.

=== Capital punishment ===
Dershowitz staunchly opposes the death penalty. In 1963, as a law clerk to Justice Arthur Goldberg, he wrote a memo at Goldberg's behest that was never published as an opinion, arguing that the death penalty violated the Eighth Amendment's prohibition on cruel and unusual punishments. Dershowitz sent the memo to the NAACP LDF and the ACLU, which then waged a campaign against the death penalty that resulted in a de facto moratorium on executions beginning in 1967 and the landmark 1972 Supreme Court case Furman v. Georgia, which found the death penalty as then applied unconstitutional. The 1976 case Gregg v. Georgia upheld numerous states' revised death penalty statutes. Dershowitz has continued to criticize capital punishment.

=== Torture ===
After the September 11 attacks, Dershowitz published an article in the San Francisco Chronicle titled "Want to Torture? Get a Warrant", in which he advocated the issuance of warrants permitting the torture of terrorism suspects if there were an "absolute need to obtain immediate information in order to save lives coupled with probable cause that the suspect had such information and is unwilling to reveal it." He argued that authorities should be permitted to use non-lethal torture in a ticking time bomb scenario and that it would be less destructive to the rule of law to regulate the process than to leave it to individual law-enforcement agents' discretion. He favors preventing the government from prosecuting the subject of torture based on information revealed during such an interrogation. Robert Fothergill's 2003 play The Dershowitz Protocol is named after Dershowitz.

William F. Schulz, executive director of the U.S. section of Amnesty International, found Dershowitz's ticking-bomb scenario unrealistic because, he argued, it would require that "the authorities know that a bomb has been planted somewhere; know it is about to go off; know that the suspect in their custody has the information they need to stop it; know that the suspect will yield that information accurately in a matter of minutes if subjected to torture; and know that there is no other way to obtain it."

=== Animal rights ===
Dershowitz is one of several scholars at Harvard Law School who have expressed their support for limited animal rights. In his Rights from Wrongs: A Secular Theory of the Origins of Rights (2004), he writes that, in order to prevent human beings from treating each other the way we treat animals, we have made what he calls the "somewhat arbitrary decision" to single out our own species for different and better treatment. "Does this subject us to the charge of speciesism? Of course it does, and we cannot justify it, except by the fact that in the world in which we live, humans make the rules. That reality imposes on us a special responsibility to be fair and compassionate to those on whom we impose our rules. Hence the argument for animal rights."

=== Criticism of the American Civil Liberties Union ===
In June 2018, Dershowitz wrote an op-ed criticizing the American Civil Liberties Union, alleging that it had become a hyper-partisan organization and was no longer the nonpartisan group of politically diverse individuals sharing a commitment to core civil liberties it once was. He wrote, "The move of the ACLU to the hard-left reflects an even more dangerous and more general trend in the United States: the right is moving further right; the left is moving farther left, and the center is shrinking ... The ACLU's move from the neutral protector of civil liberties to a partisan advocate of hard-left politics is both a symptom and consequence of this change." He also criticized Trump, writing that by denying fundamental civil liberties, he was also to blame for pushing the ACLU further into partisan politics.

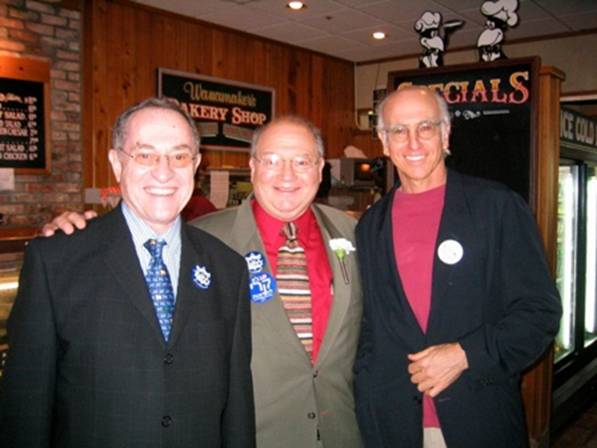
Dershowitz with Representative Gary Ackerman and Larry David in October 2004

=== Presidential candidates ===
During the 2008 Democratic Party primaries, Dershowitz endorsed Hillary Clinton, calling her "a progressive on social issues, a realist on foreign policy, a pragmatist on the economy." In 2012, he strongly supported Barack Obama's reelection, writing, "President Obama has earned my vote on the basis of his excellent judicial appointments, his consensus-building foreign policy, and the improvements he has brought about in the disastrous economy he inherited." In 2018, after a photo with Obama and Nation of Islam leader Louis Farrakhan at a 2005 meeting of the Congressional Black Caucus emerged, Dershowitz said he would never have campaigned for Obama had the photo been publicized soon after it was taken.

In the 2020 Democratic Party primaries, Dershowitz endorsed Joe Biden. He said: "I'm a strong supporter of Joe Biden. I like Joe Biden. I've liked him for a long time, and I could enthusiastically support Joe Biden." He criticized Bernie Sanders, saying: "I don't think under any circumstances I could vote for a man who went to England and campaigned for a bigot and anti-Semite like Jeremy Corbyn."

=== Donald Trump ===
Dershowitz has offered commentary on Trump's legal issues that has been polarizing among liberals and Democrats, as he has often been perceived as offering defenses of Trump's more controversial actions. He has maintained that his weighing in is apolitical, saying, "I am a liberal Democrat in politics, but a neutral civil libertarian when it comes to the Constitution."

In January 2018, Dershowitz said that attacking Trump's mental fitness was a "very dangerous" line of attack and that there was "no case" that Trump committed obstruction of justice by firing former FBI Director James Comey. He called the indictment of Michael Flynn the strangest he had ever seen because Flynn lied about something that was not illegal, and claimed that "collusion" in reference to Russian meddling in the 2016 election is not a crime. But Dershowitz said that Trump's alleged disclosure of classified information to Russia is "the most serious charge ever made against a sitting president." His 2018 book The Case Against Impeaching Trump argues against impeachment.

Dershowitz has received some criticism from liberals and praise from conservatives for his comments on these issues. He defended Supreme Court nominee Brett Kavanaugh against accusations by Julie Swetnick that Kavanaugh and Mark Judge were at a party where she was gang-raped. Dershowitz said on Fox News, "that affidavit is so deeply flawed and so open-ended that any good lawyer, any good defense attorney would be able to tear that apart in 30 seconds". He called on Swetnick's lawyer, Michael Avenatti, who was also representing Stormy Daniels, to withdraw the affidavit because of inconsistencies.

Dershowitz and others recommended that Trump commute Sholom Rubashkin's sentence for bank fraud in the Agriprocessors case.

In 2019, Dershowitz said he would "enthusiastically support Joe Biden" for president.

In 2021, Dershowitz said that Trump's rally preceding the 2021 storming of the United States Capitol was "constitutionally protected" speech. He said it would be his "honor and privilege" to defend Trump in a trial. Trump reportedly considered him for his defense team.

== Academic and other disputes ==
In 2012, after Alice Walker refused to have her novel The Color Purple translated into Hebrew and published by an Israeli firm, citing her disagreement with Israeli politics and the treatment of Palestinians, Dershowitz published an editorial in The Jerusalem Post accusing her of bigotry, calling her decision "the moral and legal equivalent of neo-Nazi author David Duke disallowing his books to be sold to Black and Jewish readers".

In November 2025, Shmuley Boteach sued Dershowitz for defamation over comments he made about Boteach allegedly taking a paid trip to Qatar.

=== Norman Finkelstein ===
Shortly after the publication of Dershowitz's The Case for Israel (2003), Norman Finkelstein of DePaul University said the book contained material plagiarized from Joan Peters's 1984 book From Time Immemorial. Dershowitz denied the allegation, and Harvard's president, Derek Bok, investigated the allegation and determined that no plagiarism had occurred. Los Angeles attorney Frank Menetrez wrote an article analyzing the dispute's details that supported Finkelstein's charges, concluding: "I don't see how Dershowitz could, purely by coincidence, have precisely reproduced all of Peters' errors [in quoting The Innocents Abroad] if he was working from the original Twain." CounterPunch published Dershowitz's response and Menetrez's reply. Dershowitz dismissed the charges as verifiably false and politically motivated by hostility to his support for Israel, and Menetrez reaffirmed his view that the evidence pointed to Dershowitz having plagiarized his sources.

In October 2006, Dershowitz wrote to DePaul University faculty members to lobby against Finkelstein's application for tenure, accusing Finkelstein of poor scholarship, lying, and antisemitism. The Middle East Studies Association, which represents scholars, sent a letter to DePaul's president expressing concern that the tenure decision had been "unduly politicized." DePaul's Arts and Sciences' Faculty Governance Council sent letters to the presidents of Harvard and DePaul complaining of Dershowitz's interference. In June 2007, in a 4–3 vote by the faculty panel, DePaul University denied Finkelstein tenure.

=== Mearsheimer and Walt ===
In March 2006, a working paper co-written by John Mearsheimer, professor of political science at the University of Chicago, and Stephen Walt, professor of international affairs at Harvard Kennedy School, titled "The Israel Lobby and U.S. Foreign Policy" was published in The London Review of Books. Mearsheimer and Walt argue that the Israel lobby wields disproportionate influence over U.S. foreign policy in the Middle East. In a March 2006 interview with The Harvard Crimson, Dershowitz called the article "one-sided" and its authors "liars" and "bigots". The next day, on MSNBC's Scarborough Country, he suggested the paper had been derived from multiple hate sites: "Every paragraph virtually is copied from a neo-Nazi Web site, from a radical Islamic Web site, from David Duke's Web site." Dershowitz subsequently wrote a report challenging the paper, arguing that it contained "three types of major errors: Quotations are wrenched out of context, important facts are misstated or omitted, and embarrassingly weak logic is employed." In a May 2006 letter in The London Review of Books, Mearsheimer and Walt denied that they had used any racist sources for their article, noting that Dershowitz had failed to offer any evidence to support his claim.

Dershowitz wrote a paper opining that criticizing the Israel lobby promoted a charged debate about what constitutes antisemitic conspiracy theorizing. Early drafts of this were sent to Jeffrey Epstein; at the time, Dershowitz was Epstein's lawyer during the child sex trafficking case.

== Personal life and family ==
Dershowitz's first wife was Sue Barlach. In his book Chutzpah, he described Barlach as an "Orthodox Jewish girl." The two met during high school at a Jewish summer camp in the Catskills. They married in 1959, when Dershowitz was 20 and Barlach was 18. Barlach and Dershowitz had two sons together: Elon Dershowitz, a film producer, and Jamin Dershowitz, an attorney who is general counsel for the Women's National Basketball Association (WNBA). Barlach and Dershowitz separated in 1973 and divorced in 1976. Although Barlach was initially given custody, Dershowitz fought for and was later awarded full custody of their children. During the divorce proceedings, Barlach alleged that Dershowitz physically abused her, resulting in the need for medical treatment and therapy. The New Yorker reported that Barlach later worked as a research librarian and "drowned in the East River, in an apparent suicide" on December 31, 1983.

Jamin Dershowitz married a Roman Catholic, which helped prompt Alan Dershowitz to write The Vanishing American Jew, dedicated to them and their children, whom Dershowitz regards as Jewish. He has two grandchildren by Jamin.

In 1986, Dershowitz married Carolyn Cohen, a retired neuropsychologist. They have one child, born in 1990. Dershowitz and Cohen divide their time between homes in Martha's Vineyard, Miami Beach, and Manhattan.

Dershowitz is a relative of Los Angeles Conservative rabbi Zvi Dershowitz.

In February 2024, Dershowitz signed the Jewish Future Promise.

== Awards and recognitions ==
Dershowitz was named a Guggenheim Fellow in 1979, and in 1983 received the William O. Douglas First Amendment Award from the Anti-Defamation League for his work on civil rights. In November 2007, he was awarded the Soviet Jewry Freedom Award by the Russian Jewish Community Foundation. In December 2011, he was awarded the Menachem Begin Award of Honor by the Menachem Begin Heritage Center at an event co-sponsored by NGO Monitor. Dershowitz was honored with a stone in the Brooklyn Botanic Garden's Celebrity Path. He has been awarded honorary doctorates in law from Yeshiva University, the Hebrew Union College, Monmouth University, University of Haifa, Syracuse University, Fitchburg State College, Bar-Ilan University, and Brooklyn College. He is a member of the International Advisory Board of NGO Monitor.

Dershowitz has appeared as himself in the television series Picket Fences, Spin City, and First Monday, and in the 2019 documentary No Safe Spaces.

== In popular culture ==
In the film Reversal of Fortune (1990), Dershowitz was portrayed by Ron Silver.

Evan Handler portrays Dershowitz in the 2016 television series The People v. O. J. Simpson: American Crime Story.

On Saturday Night Live's January 26, 2020, episode, Jon Lovitz played Dershowitz, who ends up in Hell during a near-death experience, where he encounters Jeffrey Epstein.

== Works ==
- 1982: The Best Defense. ISBN 978-0-394-50736-1.
- 1985: Reversal of Fortune: Inside the von Bülow Case. ISBN 978-0-394-53903-4.
- 1988: Taking Liberties: A Decade of Hard Cases, Bad Laws, and Bum Raps. ISBN 978-0-8092-4616-8.
- 1991: Chutzpah. ISBN 978-0-316-18137-2.
- 1992: Contrary to Popular Opinion. ISBN 978-0-88687-701-9.
- 1994: The Advocate's Devil (fiction). ISBN 978-0-446-51759-1.
- 1994: The Abuse Excuse: And Other Cop-Outs, Sob Stories, and Evasions of Responsibility. ISBN 978-0-316-18135-8.
- 1996: Reasonable Doubts: The Criminal Justice System and the O. J. Simpson Case. ISBN 978-0-684-83021-6.
- 1997: The Vanishing American Jew: In Search of Jewish Identity for the Next Century. ISBN 978-0-316-18133-4.
- 1998: Sexual McCarthyism: Clinton, Starr, and the Emerging Constitutional Crisis. ISBN 978-0-465-01628-0.
- 1999: Just Revenge (fiction). ISBN 978-0-446-60871-8.
- 2000: The Genesis of Justice: Ten Stories of Biblical Injustice that Led to the Ten Commandments and Modern Law. Warner Books. ISBN 978-0-446-67677-9.
- 2001: Letters to a Young Lawyer. Basic Books. ISBN 978-0-465-01631-0.
- 2001: Supreme Injustice: How the High Court Hijacked Election 2000. Oxford University Press. ISBN 978-0-19-514827-5.
- 2002: Why Terrorism Works: Understanding the Threat, Responding to the Challenge. Yale University Press. ISBN 978-0-300-09766-5.
- 2002: Shouting Fire: Civil Liberties in a Turbulent Age. Little Brown. ISBN 978-0-316-18141-9.
- 2003: The Case for Israel. John Wiley & Sons. ISBN 978-0-471-46502-7
- 2003: America Declares Independence. John Wiley & Sons. ISBN 978-0-471-26482-8.
- 2004: America on Trial: Inside the Legal Battles That Transformed Our Nation. Warner Books. ISBN 978-0-446-52058-4.
- 2004: Rights From Wrongs: A Secular Theory of the Origins of Rights. ISBN 978-0-465-01713-3.
- 2005: The Case for Peace: How the Arab-Israeli Conflict Can be Resolved. John Wiley & Sons. ISBN 978-0-471-74317-0; "Chapter 16" (PDF). Archived from the original (PDF) on January 1, 2006.;(111 KB).
- 2006: Preemption: A Knife That Cuts Both Ways. W.W. Norton & Company. ISBN 978-0-393-06012-6.
- 2007: Blasphemy: How the Religious Right is Hijacking the Declaration of Independence. ISBN 978-0-470-08455-7.
- 2007: Finding Jefferson: A Lost Letter, a Remarkable Discovery, and the First Amendment in an Age of Terrorism. ISBN 978-0-470-16711-3.
- 2008: Is There a Right to Remain Silent?: Coercive Interrogation and the Fifth Amendment After 9/11. ISBN 978-0-19-530779-5.
- 2008: The Case Against Israel's Enemies: Exposing Jimmy Carter and Others Who Stand in the Way of Peace. ISBN 978-0-470-37992-9.
- 2009: Mouth of Webster, Head of Clay essay in The Face in the Mirror: Writers Reflect on Their Dreams of Youth and the Reality of Age. ISBN 978-1-59102-752-2.
- 2009: The Case For Moral Clarity: Israel, Hamas and Gaza. ISBN 978-0-9661548-5-6.
- 2010: The Trials of Zion. ISBN 978-0-446-57673-4.
- 2013: Taking the Stand: My Life in the Law. ISBN 978-0307719270.
- 2014: Terror Tunnels: The Case for Israel's Just War Against Hamas. ISBN 978-0795344312.
- 2015: Abraham: The World's First (But Certainly Not Last) Jewish Lawyer (Jewish Encounters Series). ISBN 978-0805242935.
- 2016: Electile Dysfunction: A Guide for Unaroused Voters. ISBN 978-0795350214.
- 2017: Trumped Up: How Criminalization of Political Differences Endangers Democracy. ISBN 978-1974617890.
- 2018: The Case Against Impeaching Trump. ISBN 978-1510742284.
- 2018: The Case Against BDS: Why Singling Out Israel for Boycott is Anti-Semitic. (self-published), ISBN 978-1984956699.
- 2019: Defending Israel: The Story of My Relationship with My Most Challenging Client. ISBN 978-1250179975.
- 2019: Guilt by Accusation: The Challenge of Proving Innocence in the Age of #MeToo. ISBN 978-1510757561.
- 2019: Speaking for Israel: A Speechwriter Battles Anti-Israel Opinions at the United Nations with Aviva Klompas. ISBN 978-1510743915.
- 2020: Cancel Culture: The Latest Attack on Free Speech and Due Process. ISBN 978-1510764903.
- 2021: The Case Against the New Censorship: Protecting Free Speech from Big Tech, Progressives, and Universities. ISBN 978-1510767737
- 2023: Get Trump: The Threat to Civil Liberties, Due Process, and Our Constitutional Rule of Law. ISBN 978-1510777811
- 2023: War Against the Jews: How to End Hamas Barbarism ISBN 978-1510780545
- 2023: Defending Israel: Against Hamas and its Radical Left Enablers. ISBN 978-1510780521
- 2024: War on Woke: Why the New McCarthyism Is More Dangerous Than the Old. ISBN 978-1510780361
- 2024: The Ten Big Anti-Israel Lies and How to Refute them with Truth. ISBN 978-1-5107-8354-6
- 2025: The Preventive State: The Challenge of Preventing Serious Harms While Preserving Essential Liberties. ISBN 978-1-6417-7440-6
- 2026: Could President Trump Constitutionally Serve a Third Term?: My Nonpartisan Legal Analysis. ISBN 978-1-5107-8707-0

== See also ==
- List of law clerks for the second seat of the Supreme Court of the United States
