= Kidnapping of Evyatar David =

Gaza war hostage case (2023 – 2025)

- Part of the Gaza war hostage crisis
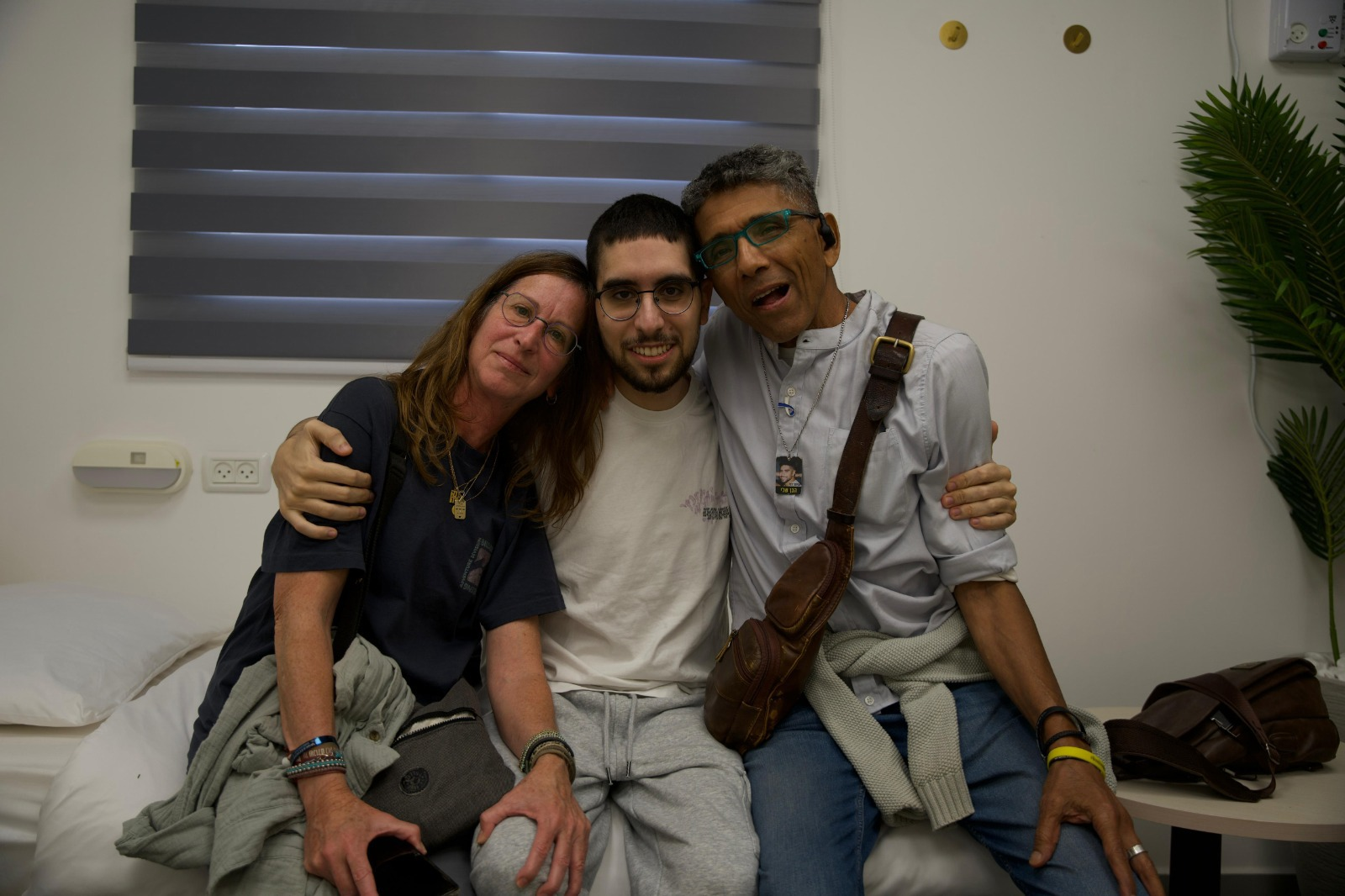
- Evyatar David (center) flanked by his parents soon after his release on October 13, 2025
- Location: Eshkol Regional Council, Israel
- Date: October 7, 2023–October 13, 2025
- Attack type: Kidnapping

Evyatar David (Hebrew: אביתר דוד) is an Israeli man who was kidnapped during the Nova music festival massacre of the October 7 attacks, and was held as a hostage by Hamas until October 13, 2025, when he was released as part of a hostage-prisoner exchange.

== Background ==
Evyatar David was born on December 24, 2000, to Avishai and Galia David. He is from Kfar Saba. He has a brother Ilay, and a sister Yeela. David had been childhood best friends with fellow hostage Guy Gilboa-Dalal, since the age of one and a half when they began Yael preschool in Kfar Saba.

== Kidnapping ==
David spent October 6, with his family before he headed out with friends to attend the Nova festival near Re'im. David was kidnapped from the Nova festival during the October 7 attacks. Reportedly after the family heard rocket fire near their home and had taken shelter, David's mother began texting with him with the last message being received at 7:43 am. He reported being shot at and trying to escape by vehicle, before the connection was lost. He was taken with his childhood best friend Guy Gilboa-Dalal. His family saw videos around about 2pm that had been sent to them showing David being led away with his hand tied by Hamas militants.

== Captivity ==
David and Gilboa-Dalal were shown in a video taken on February 22, 2025, during the January 2025 ceasefire watching the release of three other hostages, Omer Shem Tov, Eliya Cohen and Omer Wenkert, after 505 days. David and Gilboa-Dalal were not freed and remained as hostages. The video was the first sign of life from David since being kidnapped, and the first of Gilboa-Dalal since June 2024.

In March 2025 it was reported that David and Gilboa-Dalal were being held with their hands and feet tied, bags over their heads, and fed very little in complete darkness, which makes it difficult to know what they are eating. They receive one shower a month with a bucket of water. David does not have his glasses and is unable to see well.

== Starvation ==
A still image from a Hamas-released video in which David, in an emaciated state, is made to dig his own grave

In August 2025, on the day that coincided with the Jewish commemoration day of Tisha B'Av, Hamas released footage of David showing him in an severely emaciated state and forced to dig his own grave. Pale and sallow, David stated that he had not eaten in days and received little water to drink. The video was juxtaposed by footage of emaciated Gazan children. A similar video was released by Palestinian Islamic Jihad depicting hostage Rom Braslavski.

Israeli Prime Minister Benjamin Netanyahu and David's family members said that the video was proof that the hostages were being deliberately malnourished by Hamas. David's family stated that Hamas were attempting to exploit the humanitarian crisis in Gaza for propaganda purposes, and accused Hamas of purposefully restricting or diverting humanitarian aid into Gaza. David's family said that footage from the released video, such as the "large" arm of a Hamas fighter handing David a can of food, show that Hamas members are well fed amid the Gaza famine. In a letter to the United Nations Security Council, Hamas stated that the hostages "are experiencing the same conditions as the people of Gaza" who faced chronic food shortages and restrictions of aid amid Israel's 2023 blockade of the Gaza Strip. The video led to international outcry and sparked protests in Hostages Square in Tel Aviv, Israel.

An Instagram post shared by Greta Thunberg and other pro-Palestinian activists in October 2025 featured a still image of David from the August video, suggesting he is a suffering Palestinian prisoner held by Israel. The post was mocked on social media and condemned by David's sister, Yeela, and educator Aviva Klompas. Yeela David called on Thunberg to delete the post.

=== Reactions ===
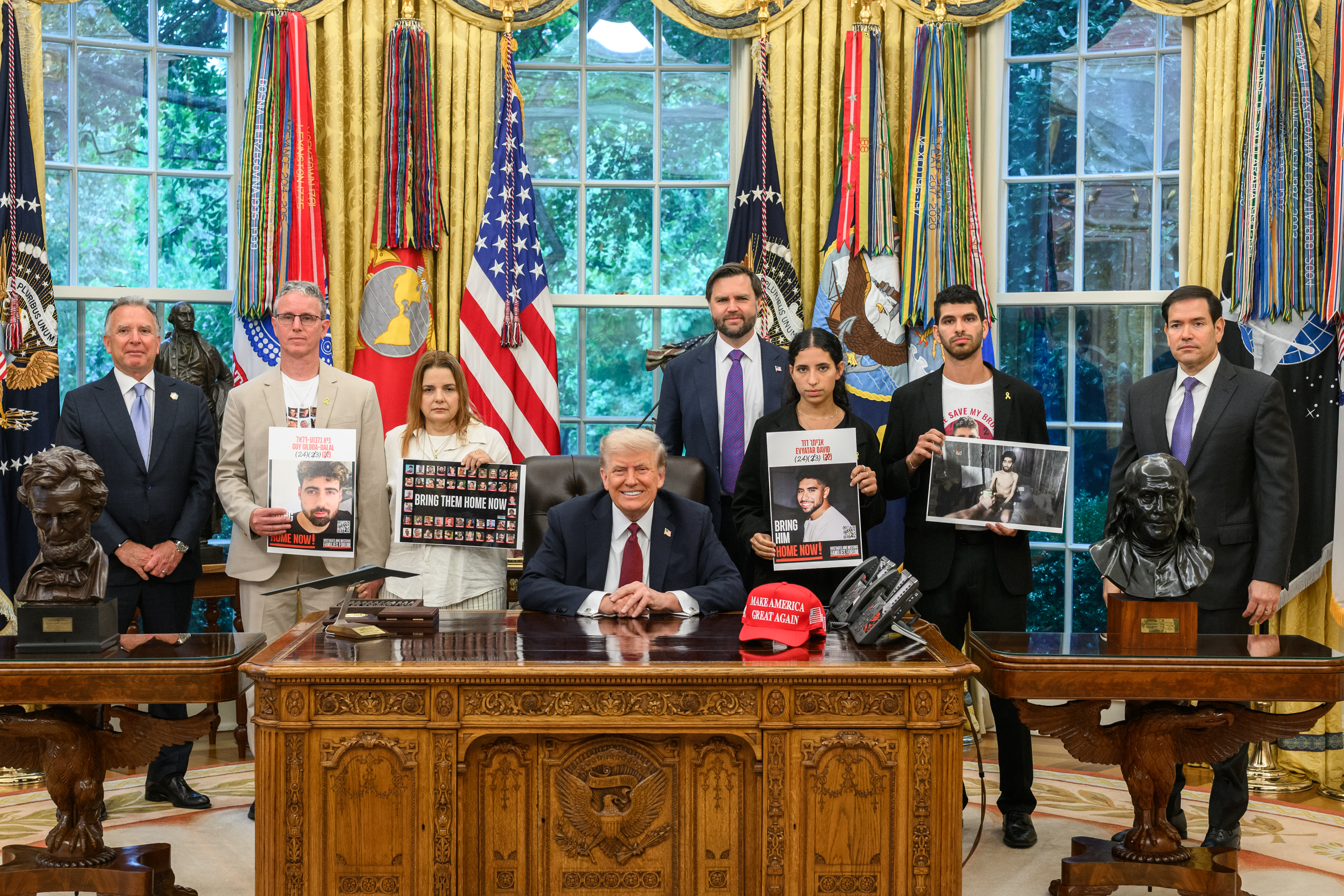
US President Donald Trump and Vice President JD Vance meet with David's family and other family and hostages in September 2025.

David's family compared it to the Holocaust, referring to him as a muselmann. They said his life was in "immediate danger", and that he had been "deliberately and cynically starved in Hamas’ tunnels in Gaza". They also describing him as "a living skeleton, buried alive." In an interview with Geoff Bennett on PBS NewsHour, David's cousin, Matan Eshet, pointed out that the Hamas captor had a much larger hand and arm than David, showing the former is well-fed. Eshet continued that the captor also is tanned, showing he has been outside regularly. The Israeli foreign ministry also mentioned the contrast in a tweet.

The video was also condemned by several world leaders:

- European Union – High Representative for Foreign Affairs Kaja Kallas said that the video exposes "the barbarity" of Hamas, calling for them to disarm and end its rule in Gaza.
- France – President Emmanuel Macron called it "abject cruelty, an unlimited inhumanity", which "embodies Hamas". France’s foreign minister also called for humanitarian aid to be supplied to the people of Gaza in massive quantities while denouncing the video he labelled as "despicable".
- Germany – Chancellor Friedrich Merz said he was "appalled" by the footage. "Hamas is torturing hostages, terrorising Israel, and using Gaza’s population as a human shield." The German government called on Israel to deliver more aid to Gaza and called the current amount "insufficient".
- ICRC – The organization stated it was "appalled" and that this is "stark evidence of the life-threatening conditions in which the hostages are being held". They called for access to the hostages to assess their condition, provide medical support, as well as contact with their families.
- Israel – Prime Minister Benjamin Netanyahu expressed "profound shock" and told hostage families that the govern "will continue constantly and relentlessly" seek their release.
- United Kingdom – Foreign Secretary David Lammy said that "images of hostages being paraded for propaganda are sickening" and the hostages must be released "unconditionally".
- United States – President Donald Trump responded to a question at a press conference, saying that the video was "horrible" and he hoped more people would see it.

The American Jewish Committee took out a full-page advertisement in The New York Times which showed side by side photos of David before his kidnapping and a still from the video, beneath the caption "Kidnapped. Starved." British singer Jessie J shared stills from the video of David on her Instagram account, calling them heart breaking and stated "To see the past become present is a horror. Never Again. Again"

Columnist Aviya Kushner wrote in The Forward that there is a stark difference between portrayals of the video in Israeli and American media. Israeli media shows the full video, while American media shows selectively-picked stills.

== Release efforts ==
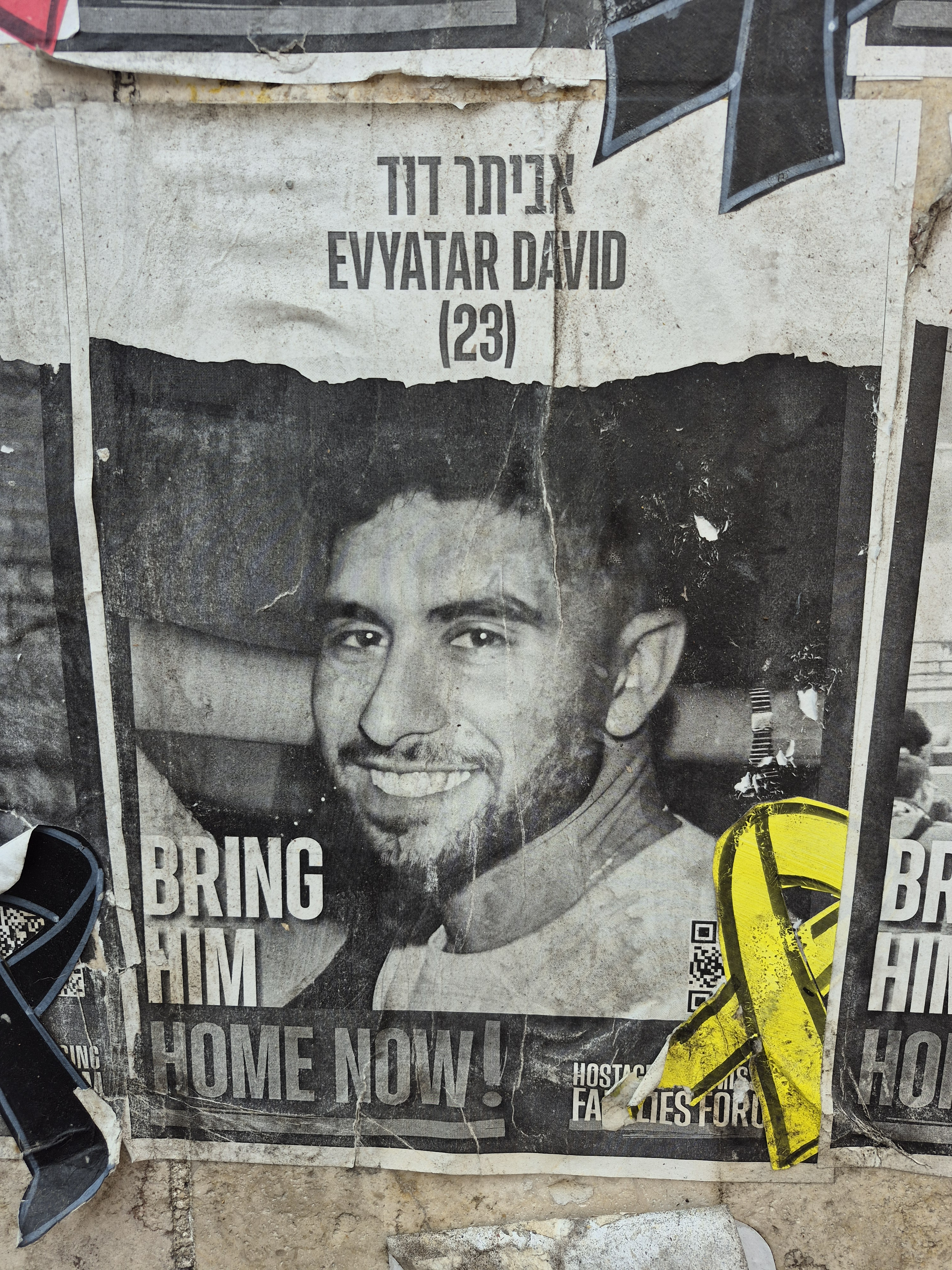
Poster calling for the release of Evyatar David in Tel Aviv

The Hostages and Missing Families Forum called on Netanyahu and the government to "expedite the negotiations and bring about the immediate return of all the hostages" when David appeared in the Hamas video in February 2025.

At a United Nations Security Council discussion on the hostage crisis, Ilay David spoke about his brother's conditions and criticized the council for their silence, and what he views as complicity in the continued crisis. Netanyahu spoke with the regional head of the International Committee of the Red Cross and "asked for his involvement in the immediate providing of food and medical care to our hostages". The Israeli government placed an advertisement photograph of David on a billboard in Times Square, with the captions "Hamas is starving the Israeli hostages" and "Ignored by the media too busy echoing Hamas propaganda". The display was intended to highlight the ongoing Gaza war hostage crisis, in light of allegations of famine in Gaza, which Israel Consul General in New York Ofir Akunis labelled a blood libel.

Ilay and Yeela David, along with former hostages Ohad and Raz Ben Ami, met with President Trump and other administration officials in September 2025. During the meeting, Trump pledged his support and commitment to bring the hostages home. Galia David and other relatives of hostages also met with French President Emmanuel Macron in Paris to reenforce the priority of freeing the hostages in any discussions.

== Release ==
As part of the Gaza Peace Plan, he was released on October 13, 2025. Prior to his release David was one of many hostages who were able to video call family members while still being held by Hamas. David and Gilboa-Dalal were reunited after their release at the Rabin Medical Center in Petah Tikva, Israel, after being separated and held separately for the last two months as hostages.

== See also ==
- List of Gaza war hostages
