= Julie Platt =

American banker and philanthropist

- Born: Julie Beren; 1957 (age 68–69); Wichita, Kansas, U.S.
- Education: University of Pennsylvania
- Occupations: Philanthropist; banker
- Spouse: Marc Platt
- Children: 5, including Ben and Jonah

Julie Platt (née Beren; born 1957) is an American banker and philanthropist.

Between 2022 and 2025, she served as the chair of the Board of Trustees of the Jewish Federations of North America, the second woman to serve as the chair for the organization, which oversees 146 Jewish federations across the United States and Canada that distribute over $3 billion each year. Amid antisemitism controversies at the University of Pennsylvania, she was appointed interim chair of the school's board of trustees in December 2023.

Platt is the wife of producer Marc Platt and the mother of actors Ben Platt and Jonah Platt.

== Personal life ==
Platt was born to Joan Schiff Beren, a noted philanthropist to Jewish causes and grew up in Wichita, Kansas, the only Jew in her public school class of about 700 students. She matriculated at the University of Pennsylvania, where in her first week on campus she met her future husband Marc Platt. After earning her bachelor's degree in 1979, she worked as a commercial banker at the now-defunct Bankers Trust in New York City.

She and her husband moved to Los Angeles. Platt and her husband have five children, including actor Ben Platt. All of the couple's children graduated from the University of Pennsylvania except for Ben, who enrolled in Columbia University before dropping out to pursue his acting career.

In 2025, Israeli President Isaac Herzog awarded Platt the Israeli Presidential Medal of Honour for her contributions to Israel and the Jewish people.

== Community leadership and philanthropy ==
Julie Platt served as chair of the Board of Trustees of the Jewish Federations of North America from 2022 to 2025, the second woman elected chair of the organization, which that oversees 146 Jewish federations across the United States and Canada that distribute over $3 billion each year. Platt led JFNA during the 2023 Israeli judicial reform and in the aftermath of the October 7 attacks on Israel.

Platt was one of the first signees of the Jewish Future Pledge, a charitable campaign modeled after The Giving Pledge to encourage American Jews to designate at least 50% of their charitable giving for Jewish or Israel-related causes.

She previously served as the chair of the Jewish Federation of Los Angeles and was on the advisory board of the Ziegler School of Rabbinic Studies at American Jewish University.

Platt has been a member of the Board of Trustees of the University of Pennsylvania since 2006 and has served as vice chair. After the resignation of board chair Scott Bok and university president Liz Magill amid antisemitism controversies, Platt became interim chair on December 10, 2023.
