= Michael Forster Rothbart =

American photojournalist

- Education: Swarthmore College
- Occupation: Photojournalist
- Notable work: Would You Stay?
- Children: 2
- Website: afterchernobyl.com

Michael Forster Rothbart is an American photojournalist. He is best known for his work documenting the human impact of nuclear disasters.

== Education and career ==
At 17, Michael Forster Rothbart joined and photographed the Icewalk North Pole expedition.

Forster Rothbart graduated from Swarthmore College in 1994 and decided to become a documentary photographer in 1996, when traveling in India. He saw a World Bank-financed dam on the Narmada River in Gujarat and found that local activist's views and community impact was undocumented.

He has worked as a staff photographer for the University of Wisconsin and as an Associated Press photographer in Central Asia. Other projects include documenting the effects of hydrofracking and USAID's programs in Central Asia.

He was a staff photographer and photo editor at SUNY Oneonta, where he also taught photojournalism. He spent 2016-2017 in Donetsk, Ukraine, reporting on the Russo-Ukrainian War for OSCE. Since 2022, he has been staff photographer and videographer at SUNY Cortland.

== Work in nuclear-affected communities ==
After receiving a U.S. Fulbright Fellowship, in 2007 Forster Rothbart interviewed and photographed residents in and around Chernobyl. For two years, he lived in Sukachi, Ukraine, a small farming village just outside the Chernobyl Exclusion Zone and also spent time in Slavutych, Ukraine, the city built after the accident to house evacuated Chernobyl plant personnel.

His photos were initially toured to American communities facing their own nuclear contamination as part of an exhibit, After Chernobyl . Forster Rothbart explained that "I created this exhibit because I want the world to know what I know: the people of Chernobyl are not victims, mutants and orphans. They are simply people living their lives, with their own joys and sorrows, hopes and fears. Like you. Like me." During each exhibit, Forster Rothbart lead photography workshops and public forums, engaging the communities in dialogue about their own local issues.

In 2012, Forster Rothbart launched a parallel project in Fukushima, Japan. He has started photographing nuclear plant workers, refugees and returning residents over a period of years.

A book of photos, interviews and essays was published October 21, 2013, by TED Books. Entitled “Would You Stay?”, it features personal narrative, photos, interviews, maps and audio recordings in an attempt to understand why people refuse to leave Chernobyl and Fukushima despite the risks. He later gave a TED talk about this work.

The National Press Photographers Association’s Best Of Photojournalism 2014 competition awarded “Would You Stay?” first place in the Multimedia Tablet/Mobile category, third place for Best Use of Multimedia and an honorable mention in the Contemporary Issues category.

== Personal life ==
Forster Rothbart is the father of two and lives in upstate New York with his spouse . He identifies as a Quaker, which he says complements work in photography, and attends Quaker meetings. He enjoys hiking and likes to take his family camping. His younger brother is author and filmmaker Davy Rothbart.
