= Jason Bitner =

American film producer

Jason Bitner (born Glen Ellyn, Illinois) is an author and project producer currently living in Chicago, Illinois. He is the co-creator of Found Magazine, a show-and-tell project celebrating found notes, letters and other ephemera; the creator of Cassette from My Ex, a storytelling project about love and mixtapes; and producer for the documentary movie La Porte, Indiana, based on Bitner's book of the same title. Bitner's work has been widely published and reviewed, and has been featured in print, web, radio, and television appearances including The New York Times, The Chicago Tribune, The Boston Globe, National Public Radio, and The New Yorker.
