= Marc Platt (producer) =

American producer (born 1957)

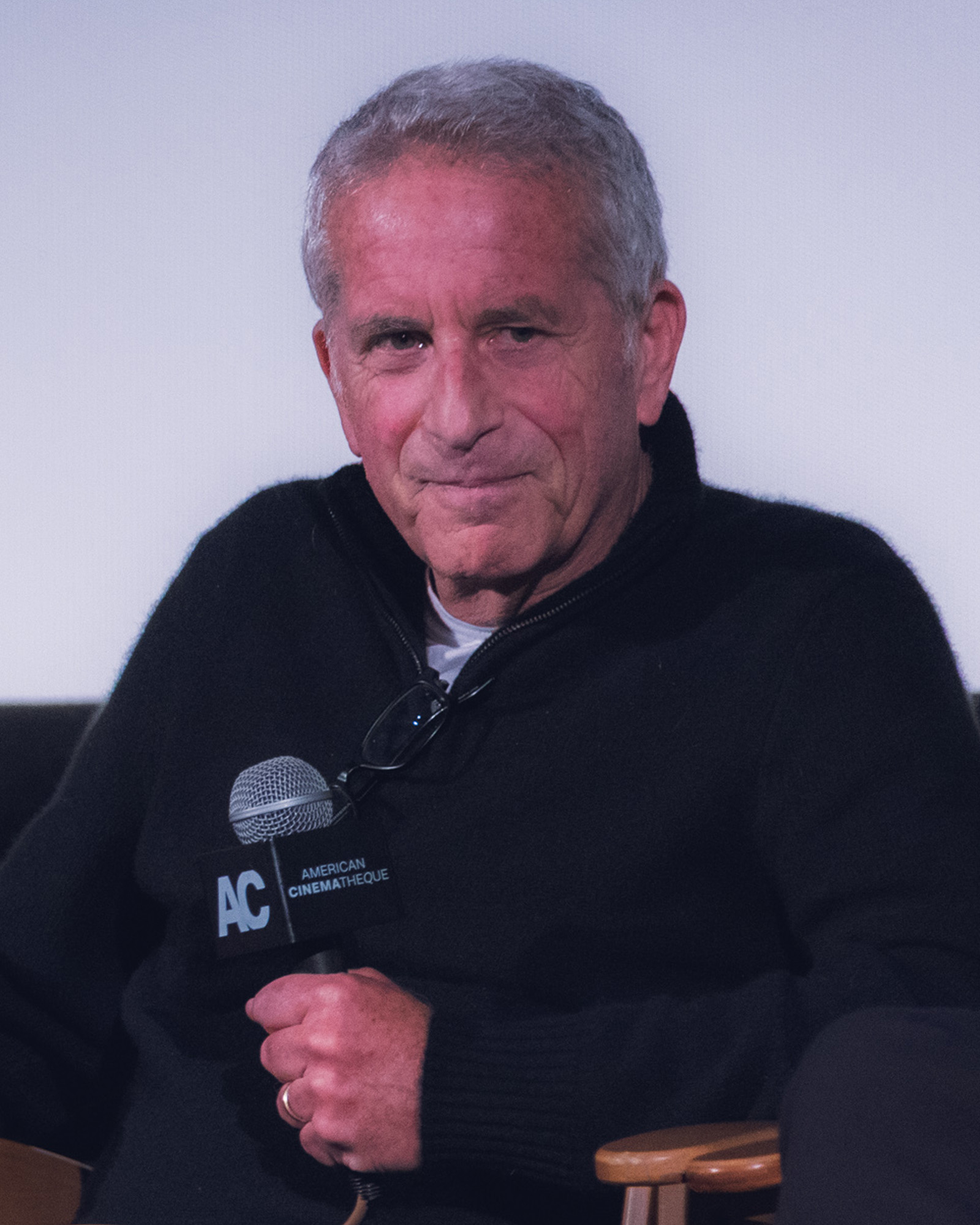
- Platt in 2025
- Born: Marc Evan Platt; April 14, 1957 (age 69); Pikesville, Maryland, U.S.
- Education: University of Pennsylvania (BA); New York University (JD)
- Occupations: Film, television and theatre producer
- Years active: 1983–present
- Known for: Filmography
- Spouse: Julie Beren (m. 1979)
- Children: 5, including Ben and Jonah
- Awards: Full list

Marc Evan Platt (born April 14, 1957) is an American producer. He has worked in film, theatre, and television, and has received numerous accolades including four Tony Awards, two Primetime Emmy Awards, two Golden Globe Awards, and a BAFTA Award, as well as nominations for four Academy Awards.

== Early life ==
Platt was born and raised in a Conservative Jewish home in Pikesville, Maryland, the son of Sue Ellen (née Sezzin), a schoolteacher, and Howard Platt, who worked in the retail shoe business. He has an older brother and a younger sister. He graduated from Pikesville High School in 1975 and the University of Pennsylvania in 1979, where he was a member of the University of Pennsylvania Glee Club. He then earned his Juris Doctor from the New York University School of Law and began his career as an entertainment attorney.

== Career ==
=== Film and television ===
Marc Platt Productions
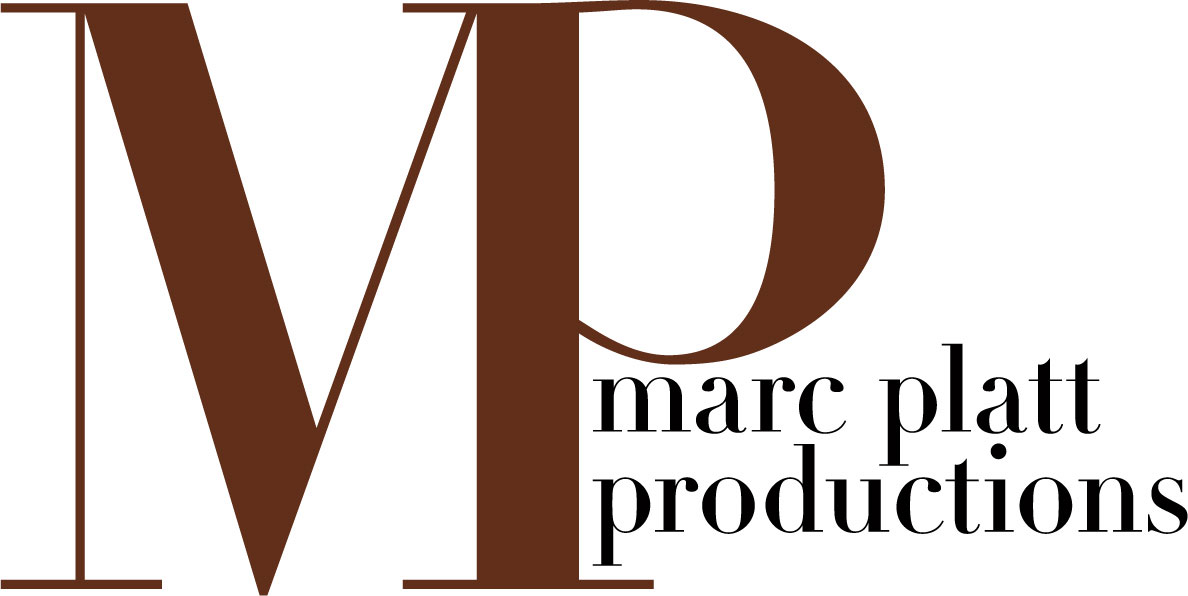
- Logo used since 2005
- Industry: Film Production; Television; Stage
- Founded: 2001; 25 years ago
- Founder: Marc Platt
- Headquarters: Universal City, California, U.S.
- Key people: Marc Platt (Principal); Adam Siegel (President)
- Website: marcplattproductions.com

Platt started producing in theatre, before moving into film. Platt was a business-affairs lawyer for (ICM) International Creative Management's superagent Sam Cohn, laying the essential groundwork of entertainment contacts. He was thirty-three years old when he replaced Mike Medavoy, at Orion Pictures, as production chief. After Orion, he served as president of production for two more movie studios: TriStar Pictures, and Universal Studios. Platt has since formed his own production company, Marc Platt Productions, within the Universal realm and continues to pursue creative projects. His company is responsible for the Legally Blonde films and the HBO miniseries Empire Falls.

Platt has produced a variety of feature films beginning with the 1987 comedy Campus Man. His films include Legally Blonde (2001), Wanted (2008), Rachel Getting Married (2008), Nine (2009), Scott Pilgrim vs. the World (2010), Drive (2011), The Girl on the Train (2016), and Cruella (2021). He also produced critically acclaimed films such as Steven Spielberg's Cold War drama Bridge of Spies (2015), Damien Chazelle's musical La La Land (2016), and Aaron Sorkin's legal drama The Trial of the Chicago 7 (2020), all of which earned him Academy Award for Best Picture nominations.

He was executive producer of the two-part docudrama The Path to 9/11, shown on ABC on the fifth anniversary of 9/11 on September 10 and 11, 2006. The film was controversial and accused of having a political agenda and fictionalising the events leading up to the September 11, 2001 attacks, especially those involving the Clinton administration.

He collaborated with Walt Disney Pictures producing numerous musicals for the studio including Into the Woods (2014), Mary Poppins Returns (2018), Aladdin (2019, as an executive producer), The Little Mermaid (2023), and Snow White (2025), as well as Universal's Wicked films (2024–2025). In 2021 he produced a film adaptation of the musical Dear Evan Hansen (2021) which featured a leading performance from his son Ben Platt, who originated the title role on Broadway. This casting, however, led to accusations of nepotism against them for having Ben, at age 27, reprise his role as the teenage title character in the film. In 2024, he collaborated with Focus Features producing coming-of-age romance film based on Hayley Kiyoko's 2023 book and her 2015 song, Girls Like Girls. For his work on television he produced Grease Live! (2016), Jesus Christ Superstar Live in Concert (2018), and Rent: Live (2019) as well as the HBO projects Empire Falls (2005), and Oslo (2021).

=== Theatre ===
Platt has produced numerous productions on the Broadway stage with his first official credit being Wicked earning his first Tony Award for Best Musical nomination. He was also nominated for Tony Award for Best Revival of a Musical for Pal Joey in 2009 and Tony Award for Best Play for Indecent in 2017. He won the Tony Award for Best Musical for The Band's Visit in 2018 and for A Strange Loop in 2022. He will also produce the upcoming stage adaptation of La La Land.

== Personal life ==
Platt and his wife Julie (née Beren) also a Penn graduate and trustee of the university, live in the Los Angeles area. They funded the construction of a performing arts rehearsal and performance space on the campus, the Platt Student Performing Arts House. Platt is a Penn Glee Club alumnus and supporter. His company has taken at least one Penn student intern a year since its inception.

The Platts have five children, including, Ben Platt and Jonah Platt, both actors and singers.

== Filmography ==
=== Film ===
Year	Tile	Credit	Notes
1987	Campus Man	Executive producer	
2001	Josie and the Pussycats		
2001	Legally Blonde		
2003	Legally Blonde 2: Red, White & Blonde		
2003	Honey		
2005	Happy Endings	Co-producer	
2005	The Perfect Man		
2007	The Seeker		
2008	Wanted		
2008	Rachel Getting Married		
2009	Legally Blondes		Direct-to-video
2009	The Other Woman		
2009	Nine		
2010	Cop Out		
2010	Scott Pilgrim vs. the World		
2010	Charlie St. Cloud		
2011	Drive		
2011	Honey 2	Executive producer	
2013	Evidence		
2013	2 Guns		
2014	Song One		
2014	Winter's Tale		
2014	We'll Never Have Paris	Executive producer	
2014	Lost River		
2014	Mockingbird		
2014	Into the Woods		
2014	Six Dance Lessons in Six Weeks	Executive producer	
2015	Ricki and the Flash		
2015	Bridge of Spies		
2016	La La Land		
2016	Honey 3: Dare to Dance	Executive producer	Direct-to-video
2016	The Girl on the Train		
2016	Billy Lynn's Long Halftime Walk		
2018	Hotel Artemis		
2018	Nappily Ever After		
2018	Mary Poppins Returns		
2019	Aladdin	Executive producer	
2020	The Trial of the Chicago 7		
2021	Thunder Force		
2021	Cruella		
2021	Dear Evan Hansen		
2022	Better Nate Than Ever		
2022	Babylon		
2023	The Little Mermaid		
2024	Players		
2024	Wicked		
2025	Snow White		
2025	How to Train Your Dragon		
2025	Wicked: For Good		
2026	Basic		
2026	Girls Like Girls		
2027	How to Train Your Dragon 2		Filming

Actor

Year	Title	Role
2022	Babylon	Producer

Thanks

Year	Tile	Role
1991	The Addams Family	Special thanks
2013	Bananas	Special thanks; short film
2016	The Comedian	The producers wish to thank the following for their assistance

Cameo appearances

Year	Title	Notes
2001	Inside 'Legally Blonde'	Documentary
2003	The Hair That Ate Hollywood	Documentary
2004	Wicked: The Road to Broadway	Documentary
2007	ShowBusiness: The Road to Broadway	Documentary
2020	Ben Platt Live from Radio City Music Hall	Concert film
2024	Wicked: The Real Story	Documentary

=== Television ===
Executive producer

Year	Title	Notes
2002	MDs	
2003	Mr. Ambassador	Television film
2003	Legally Blonde	Television pilot
2005	Empire Falls	
2005	Once Upon a Mattress	Television film
2006	The Path to 9/11	
2009−10	Taking the Stage	
2016	Grease: Live	Television special
2017	A Christmas Story Live!	Television special
2018	Jesus Christ Superstar Live in Concert	Television special
2018	A Very Wicked Halloween	Television special
2019	Rent Live!	Television special
2021	Oslo	Television film
2023	Scott Pilgrim Takes Off	
2026-present	Elle	

Actor

Year	Title	Role
2017	Curb Your Enthusiasm	Musical Director

Thanks

Year	Title	Role
2020	Saturday Night Seder	Special thanks
2024	Defying Gravity: The Curtain Rises on Wicked	With gratitude

Cameo appearances

Year	Title	Notes
2001	Backstage Pass	
2004	Broadway: The American Musical	Episode: "Putting It Together"
2008	Max on Set: Wanted	Documentary
2024	Defying Gravity: The Curtain Rises on Wicked	Television special

=== Theatre ===
- 1983: Total Abandon (play, associate producer)
- 2003–present: Wicked (musical)
- 2006: Three Days of Rain (play)
- 2008–09: Pal Joey (musical, associate producer)
- 2014: If/Then (musical)
- 2016: Oh, Hello on Broadway (Play)
- 2017: War Paint (musical)
- 2017: Indecent (play)
- 2017–19: The Band's Visit (musical)
- 2021–23: A Strange Loop (musical)
- 2022-23: Topdog/Underdog (play)
- 2023: Fat Ham (play)
- 2024: Death Becomes Her (musical)
- 2025: Buena Vista Social Club (musical)
- 2025: Purpose (play)
- TBA: La La Land (musical)

== Awards and nominations ==
Year	Award	Category	Production / Role	Result
2015	Academy Award	Best Picture	Bridge of Spies	Nominated
2016	Academy Award	Best Picture	La La Land	Nominated
2020	Academy Award	Best Picture	The Trial of the Chicago 7	Nominated
2024	Academy Award	Best Picture	Wicked	Nominated
2011	British Academy Film Award	Best Film	Drive	Nominated
2015	British Academy Film Award	Best Film	Bridge of Spies	Nominated
2016	British Academy Film Award	Best Film	La La Land	Won
2018	British Academy Film Award	Best Film	Mary Poppins Returns	Nominated
2020	British Academy Film Award	Best Film	The Trial of the Chicago 7	Nominated
2004	Tony Award	Best Musical	Wicked	Nominated
2018	Tony Award	Best Musical	The Band's Visit	Won
2022	Tony Award	Best Musical	A Strange Loop	Won
2025	Tony Award	Best Musical	Buena Vista Social Club	Nominated
2025	Tony Award	Best Musical	Death Becomes Her	Nominated
2009	Tony Award	Best Revival of a Musical	Pal Joey	Nominated
2017	Tony Award	Best Play	Indecent	Nominated
2025	Tony Award	Best Play	Purpose	Won
2023	Tony Award	Best Revival of a Play	Topdog/Underdog	Won
2009	Golden Globe Award	Best Motion Picture - Musical or Comedy	Nine	Nominated
2014	Golden Globe Award	Best Motion Picture - Musical or Comedy	Into the Woods	Nominated
2016	Golden Globe Award	Best Motion Picture - Musical or Comedy	La La Land	Won
2018	Golden Globe Award	Best Motion Picture - Musical or Comedy	Mary Poppins Returns	Nominated
2018	Golden Globe Award	Best Motion Picture - Musical or Comedy	Babylon	Nominated
2024	Golden Globe Award	Best Motion Picture - Musical or Comedy	Wicked	Nominated
2020	Golden Globe Award	Best Motion Picture – Drama	The Trial of the Chicago 7	Nominated
2024	Golden Globe Award	Cinematic and Box Office Achievement	Wicked	Won
2025	Golden Raspberry Awards	Worst Picture	Snow White	Nominated
2005	Primetime Emmy Awards	Outstanding Miniseries	Empire Falls	Nominated
2016	Primetime Emmy Awards	Outstanding Special Class Program	Grease Live!	Won
2018	Primetime Emmy Awards	Outstanding Variety Special (Live)	Jesus Christ Superstar Live in Concert	Won
2019	Primetime Emmy Awards	Outstanding Variety Special (Live)	Rent: Live	Nominated
2021	Primetime Emmy Awards	Outstanding Television Movie	Oslo	Nominated
2005	Producer's Guild of America	Outstanding Producer of Long-Form Television	Empire Falls	Nominated
2015	Producer's Guild of America	Outstanding Producer of Theatrical Motion Pictures	Bridge of Spies	Nominated
2016	Producer's Guild of America	Outstanding Producer of Theatrical Motion Pictures	La La Land	Won
2020	Producer's Guild of America	Outstanding Producer of Theatrical Motion Pictures	The Trial of the Chicago 7	Nominated
2024	Producer's Guild of America	Outstanding Producer of Theatrical Motion Pictures	Wicked	Nominated
2021	People's Choice Awards	Drama Movie of the Year	Cruella	Won
2022	North Dakota Film Society	Best Picture	Babylon	Nominated
2016	Hollywood Film Awards	Producer of the Year	Billy Lynn's Long Halftime Walk; The Girl on the Train; La La Land	Nominated
2008	Independent Spirit Awards	Best Feature	Rachel Getting Married	Nominated
2011	Independent Spirit Awards	Best Feature	Drive	Nominated
2018	CinEuphoria Awards	Best Film - International Competition	La La Land	Nominated
2023	Hollywood Music in Media Awards	Best Music Themed Film or Musical	The Little Mermaid	Nominated
2024	Hollywood Music in Media Awards	Music Themed Film, Biopic or Musical	Wicked	Nominated
2011	Online Film & Television Association	Best Picture	Drive	Nominated
2015	Online Film & Television Association	Best Picture	Bridge of Spies	Nominated
2016	Online Film & Television Association	Best Picture	La La Land	Won
