= Scott Bok =

American business executive

Scott L. Bok is an American business executive who is the chief executive officer of Greenhill & Co. He was the chair of the University of Pennsylvania board of trustees from 2021 to 2023. Bok currently serves as the Chair of the American Museum of Natural History.

== Life ==
Bok is from St. Joseph, Michigan. He earned a B.A. in political science and B.S.E. in economics in 1981 and a J.D. in 1984 from the University of Pennsylvania. From 1978 to 1980, he was a student news reporter of The Daily Pennsylvanian.

Bok worked in mergers, acquisitions, and securities law at Wachtell, Lipton, Rosen & Katz from 1984 to 1986. From 1986 to 1997, he was the managing director of the department of mergers, acquisitions, and restructuring at Morgan Stanley. Bok joined Greenhill & Co. in 1997 as its managing director, later becoming chief executive officer. On July 1, 2021, Bok succeeded David L. Cohen as the chair University of Pennsylvania board of trustees. He resigned from the board on December 9, 2023 and was succeeded by interim chair Julie Platt.
