= Jewish Future Promise =

Charitable pledge for Jewish causes

The Jewish Future Promise, originally the Jewish Future Pledge, is a charitable campaign modeled after The Giving Pledge, to encourage American Jews to designate at least 50% of their charitable giving to Jewish- or Israel-related causes. Over 100,000 people have signed the pledge since its inception in May 2020.

== History ==
Co-creators Michael Leven and Amy Holtz launched the pledge in May 2020, modeled after The Giving Pledge, to encourage American Jews to designate at least 50% of their charitable giving to Jewish- or Israel-related causes. According to Leven and Holtz, Americans will donate $68 trillion in wealth over the next generation, 20% of which will be given by Jewish donors. Its aim is for at least half of that 20%, or more than $600 billion, to go to Jewish causes, compared to the estimated 11% of donations that do now. The Pledge partnered with the Jewish Federations of North America, Jewish National Fund, and Jewish fraternity Alpha Epsilon Pi to integrate the pledge into traditional vehicles of Jewish philanthropy. The Pledge partnered with Morgan Stanley to create a donor-advised fund.

On February 8, 2024, the Pledge changed its named to the Jewish Future Promise.

=== Jewish Youth Promise ===
In 2023, the Pledge launched the Jewish Youth Promise for people aged 13-24 to commit to being active members of the Jewish community. By March 2025, the Youth Promise had surpassed 30,000 signatures, including 10,000 associated with Jewish fraternity AEPi.

== Signatories ==
As of October 2023, more than 25,000 donors, including individuals, family foundations, and families, had pledged $2.4 billion as part of the pledge. By February 2024, there were almost 50,000 signatories. According to Leven, by October 2024, there were over 80,000 signatories. The number of pledges crossed 100,000 on April 8, 2025 and surpassed 122,000 by August 2025.

Notable signers of the pledge include businessman Charles Bronfman, Home Depot founder Bernie Marcus, philanthropist Julie Platt, advocate Morton Klein, activist Noa Tishby, comedian Modi Rosenfeld, lawyer Alan Dershowitz, and actress Patricia Heaton.
