= Elon Dershowitz =

American film producer (1961–2025)

- Born: June 23, 1961; Cambridge, Massachusetts, U.S.
- Died: August 17, 2025 (aged 64)
- Relatives: Alan Dershowitz (father)

Elon Dershowitz (June 23, 1961 – August 17, 2025) was an American film producer.

== Life ==
Dershowitz was born June 23, 1961, in Cambridge, Massachusetts, to Sue Barlach and attorney Alan Dershowitz. He had a younger brother and younger half sister. At age ten, Dershowitz was diagnosed with a brain tumor and told he would not live to see his bar mitzvah. He became blind due to the brain tumor.

He graduated from Hampshire College, then worked in the Harvard Business School’s audiovisual department. Throughout his career, he produced a number of feature films, including Reversal of Fortune (1990) and The Whole Truth (2015).

Dershowitz died on August 17, 2025, at the age of 64, after suffering a stroke.
