= Rom Braslavski =

Former Israeli hostage

- רום ברסלבסקי
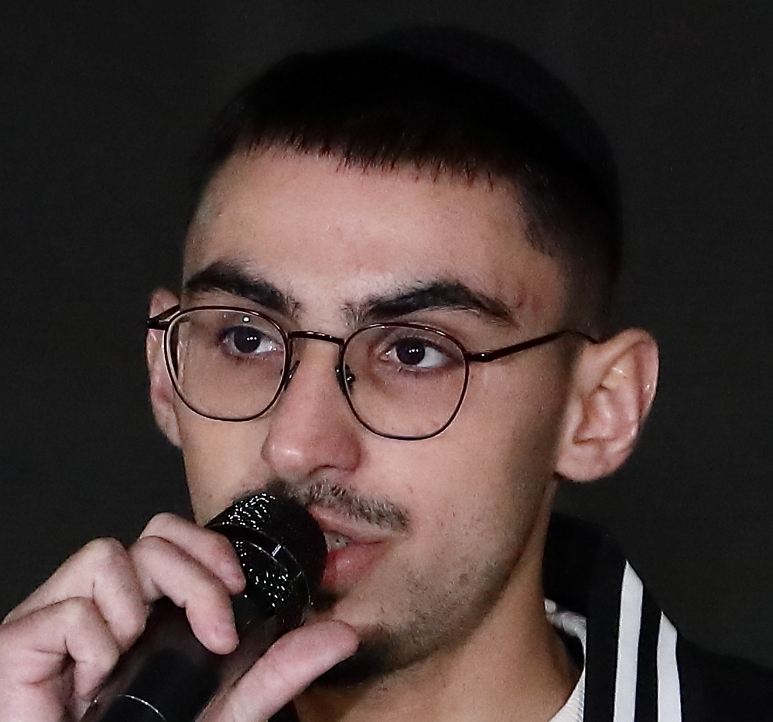
- Braslavski speaking in Hostages Square in January 2026
- Born: 2003 or 2004 (age 22–23)
- Citizenship: Israeli and German
- Known for: Being held hostage in Gaza

Rom Braslavski (Hebrew: רום ברסלבסקי; born 2003 or 2004) is a former Israeli hostage who was abducted from the Nova music festival during the October 7 attacks. At the time, he was 19 years old and working as a security guard while an active-duty soldier on leave from the Israel Defense Forces (IDF). During the ensuing Gaza war, he was held by Palestinian Islamic Jihad (PIJ) for over two years. He has reported being physically assaulted and was the first male Israeli hostage to report sexual abuse. In July 2025, PIJ and Hamas released videos of Braslavski and fellow hostage Eyvatar David in which they were emaciated and emotionally distraught. The videos led to protests and increased pressure on the Israeli government to negotiate a hostage deal with Hamas. As part of the Gaza peace plan, Braslavski was released on 13 October 2025 in the last group of living Israeli hostages. He has criticized the Israeli government for its failure to prevent the October 7 attacks and for its conduct towards the hostages. He has also spoken about dealing with post-traumatic stress disorder caused by his captivity in Gaza.

== Early life ==
Rom Braslavski was born in 2003 or 2004 and grew up in Katamonim, Jerusalem. He is the second of three brothers and has German ancestry. According to Jewish News, Braslavski and his elder brother began working at the age of 14 to support their family financially. He left school without graduating. Although he was exempt from mandatory military service, he enlisted in the IDF through the Education and Youth Corps and served in the IDF Logistic Corps. He is a resident of Pisgat Ze’ev, an Israeli settlement in East Jerusalem.

== Captivity in Gaza ==
On 7 October 2023, Braslavski was 19 years old and working as a security guard at the Nova music festival during a weekend off from his military service. At approximately 6:30 am, Palestinian militants launched an attack on the festival. According to witnesses, Braslavski helped several people escape and sustained injuries in both hands. At around 10:30 am, Braslavski contacted his mother, telling her that he was in a safe place and that he expected to be evacuated shortly. Braslavski later recounted tripping over corpses, seeing a dumpster full of bodies, and burying a dead woman while her mother called on her cellphone. In total, at least 360 people were killed and at least 40 people were taken hostage. Braslavski later stated that he attempted to escape but was captured after he inadvertently ran towards Gaza. He was taken hostage at some point between 2 and 4 pm. According to Braslavski, his captors broke his nose and kept him tied up in a bedroom for several days. He was held by PIJ and later moved to other buildings and tents, mostly in Deir al-Balah.

The first publicly available news about Braslavski was reported during the ceasefire in February 2025. Israeli hostage Sasha Trufanov was freed in the prisoner exchange and recounted briefly meeting Braslavski in Gaza in the previous year. The ceasefire ended in March 2025, and Braslavski's living conditions worsened. He later said that he refused to convert to Islam, so his captors blindfolded him, blocked his ears with stones, and reduced his rations. Additionally, they whipped and beat him multiple times per day. He has stated that his captors treated him poorly because he was a soldier and that the mistreatment intensified after he attacked one of them.

=== Videos ===
PIJ released a propaganda video of Braslavski in April 2025. According to The Times of Israel, it was probably scripted by PIJ. In it, he describes his living conditions as "hell", recounting food shortages, poor health, and bombings by the IDF. He addresses Israeli Prime Minister Benjamin Netanyahu and US President Donald Trump and asks them to secure his release. Braslavski's family expressed frustration with the Israeli government, stating that they had not been notified by any officials about the video and that they saw it on Telegram. They stated that Braslavski's appearance had declined dramatically. Three months later, in mid-July 2025, PIJ released a statement saying that it had lost contact with the group holding him and that his whereabouts were unknown. His family stated: "No one knows where Rom is – neither the IDF nor Islamic Jihad." They also accused the government of withholding information from them.

On 31 July 2025, PIJ published a second propaganda video of Braslavski which they said was filmed before they lost contact with his captors. In the video, he is visibly and severely malnourished. Distraught, he speaks about surviving on very little food, lacking the strength to stand, and feeling close to death. His father Ofir called the video "unbearable" and said that Braslavski looked like he no longer believed he would survive. A few days later, Hamas released a video of another hostage, Eyvatar David, who is also emaciated and says that he is digging his own grave. After the videos were published, Netanyahu called Braslavski's family, expressing shock and pledging to bring him home. The International Committee of the Red Cross, UK Foreign Secretary David Lammy, German Chancellor Friedrich Merz, and French President Emmanuel Macron released statements condemning the videos. New York Times columnist Bret Stephens wrote that the world outside of Israel "barely seemed to notice" the videos.

At the time, ceasefire negotiations between Israel and Hamas were stalemated, and the Israeli government was considering escalating military operations. Widespread starvation was reported in Gaza. The videos sparked outrage in the Israeli public and increased pressure on the Israeli government to negotiate a truce with Hamas. At a protest attended by tens of thousands of Israelis, Ofir publicly appealed to the government to make a deal and end the war. The Hostages and Missing Families Forum released a report with expert medical opinion estimating that Braslavski had lost 30% of his body weight and weighed 43-47 kg (95-104 lbs). The report said that the hostages were being deliberately starved and that their physical deterioration was life-threatening. Hamas stated that the hostages were eating the same amount of food as Palestinians in Gaza.

According to Braslavski, his captors sexually assaulted him after the video was published. He said that they removed his clothes and tied him up in order to humiliate him and "crush my dignity." He is the first Israeli male hostage to report sexual abuse.

=== Later months ===
Posters calling for release of Israeli hostages Alon Ohel and Rom Braslavski (January 2024)

Braslavski's family members tried to obtain US and German citizenship for him in hopes of improving his chances of release. By August 2025, Braslavski had become a dual Israeli-German citizen after Germany expedited citizenship requests for Israeli hostages.

At a meeting of the Knesset Foreign Affairs and Defense Committee in September 2025, Braslavski's father Ofir protested the IDF's plan to widen the scope of its operations in Gaza. He shouted "instead of having a toast on Rosh Hashanah, you will be drinking the blood of the hostages.....You will drink their blood because they are dead." After the meeting, several families of the hostages and their supporters marched to Netanyahu's residence. Ofir spoke about the video of his son and criticized the Israel government for "leaving" him in Gaza.

Israel and Hamas agreed to the Gaza peace plan mediated by the United States. As part of the prisoner exchange, Braslavski was released on 13 October 2025. After more than two years in captivity, he was among the 20 last living Israeli hostages freed during the Gaza war. He was taken to Sheba Medical Center at Tel Hashomer for treatment and rehabilitation. Two days after his release, his mother told Ynet that he had been tortured physically and mentally by PIJ. She said that he was force-fed prior to his release.

== Post-release activities ==
Braslavski has spoken about the ongoing physical and mental impacts of his time as a hostage. He has reported having 10 panic attacks a day and stated that he will be struggling with post-traumatic stress disorder for the rest of his life. He was invited to meet US President Donald Trump but had to cancel due to mental health issues. In June 2026, Braslavski visited Trump wearing a t-shirt that said: "Thank you very much, Trump” in Hebrew.

Braslavski has been critical of the Israeli government's failure to prevent the October 7 attacks and of its treatment of him. The month after his release, he said that he was being ignored by officials and called the NIS 60,000 ($18,600 USD) compensation he received "simply an embarrassment". He criticized the selection of Hostage Coordinator Gal Hirsch as an independence day torchbearer, calling it disrespectful to the hostage families. At events organized by the October Council, Braslavski called for all members of the Israeli government to resign and for a commission of inquiry into the October 7 attacks.

In early 2026, Braslavski reported that he was denied entry to a Tel Aviv night club where the singer Nasrin Kadri had invited him to meet her. He accused Kadri's boyfriend, David Ziton, of assaulting him "like a Hamas member", stating that the attack was "the most shocking thing that's ever happened to me". According to Walla, a video was shown in court of Ziton kicking Braslvaski on the ground. The case was closed by the police without action later that year.

The IDF reported in June 2026 that it had killed the PIJ commander who had held Braslavski hostage in an airstrike. Braslavski posted about his reaction on social media, saying that he had cried at the news. He wrote: "This is the man who, under his orders and with his own hands, abused me and almost killed me several times." Additionally, he stated: "Have fun in hell".

Braslavski is the host of a podcast, "October 8", the first episode of which was released in August 2026 and featured an interview with far-right national security minister Itamar Ben-Gvir. During the interview Braslavski asked Ben-Gvir to allow him to personally execute Hamas members convicted under the Death Penalty for Terrorists Law. Ben-Gvir pledged to "turn the world upside down" to ensure Braslavski could take part in any executions. Additionally Ben-Gvir criticized the reduction in Israeli bombing of Gaza, advocating for killing 30-40 Palestinians every night.

== See also ==
- List of Gaza war hostages
