= Found Magazine =

American zine

- Issue #4 of Found Magazine, published in 2005.
- Frequency: Irregular
- Format: Zine
- Founder: Davy Rothbart and Jason Bitner
- Founded: 2001
- Country: United States
- Based in: Ann Arbor, Michigan
- Language: English
- Website: foundmagazine.com
- OCLC: 48511847

Found Magazine, created by Davy Rothbart and Jason Bitner and based in Ann Arbor, Michigan, USA, collected and cataloged found notes, photos, and other ephemera, publishing them in an irregularly issued magazine, in books, and on its website. Items found and published have ranged from love letters to homework assignments, and they are contributed by people who find them in a variety of public places, all over the world.

== History ==
The idea of Found Magazine started when its co-creator, Davy Rothbart, found a note mistakenly left on his windshield in Logan Square, Chicago. Rothbart shared this peek into someone else's private life with his friends. He and Jason Bitner, a friend Rothbart met at an NPR pick-up basketball game in Chicago, began soliciting other found items from their circle of friends. Originally presented as photocopied fliers of some of the best finds, they realized that the volume of found material they collected warranted a full magazine. Laying the material out in a zine format, Rothbart and Bitner took their creation to a local Kinko's, intending to make 50 copies to share with their friends who provided the magazine's content. An unexpected patron, actually an off-duty Kinko's employee, left Rothbart and Bitner with 700 free copies. With such a surprising abundance, they decided to give the excess to local stores to share with everybody. With the support of Quimby's Bookstore and other Chicago independent book sellers, the magazine sold quickly. Realizing that their project appealed to more than just their friends, Rothbart and Bitner renamed their collection of photocopied finds Found Magazine #1 and started gathering material for future editions. Found has grown from a Chicago-based photocopied zine to a nationally distributed annual magazine. Still retaining the essentially zine format and look, Found is up to 9 issues. A 250-page Found book was released in May 2004. A sister magazine, Dirty Found, started publication in 2004. Dirty Found was started to provide a home for the smuttier, more explicit and generally sexually themed finds that Rothbart and Bitner wanted to segregate from the more conservative Found. Since 2008, Dirty Found has been out of print and will not be reprinted.

The success of Found allowed both Rothbart and Bitner to leave their day jobs and work full-time on the magazine and other personal projects. Rothbart moved to Ann Arbor, where Found is now headquartered, while Bitner went to New York City where he managed their East Coast office for a short period of time before leaving the project.

Found has also expanded beyond its original print format. Rothbart has gone on nationwide tours each year since 2002, reading favorite finds, featuring found or found-inspired music, and asking audiences to bring their own finds to share, while Bitner created and produced the Found website.

In December 2005 Atlantic Theatre Company, based in New York, created FOUND: A Musical, a play based entirely on pieces published in Found, turning the text from several pieces into songs, scenes and short films. Hunter Bell and Lee Overtree wrote the libretto, with songs by Eli Bolin. The show won the Elliot Norton Award for Best Fringe Production.

Currently, Rothbart lives in Los Angeles, California. Found Magazine is published by Quack!Media and managed daily by Sarah Locke.

Found Magazine issues #1, #2, #3, and #4 are no longer available for sale individually.

FOUND MAGAZINE: THE EARLY YEARS was released in fall 2014 and consists of the best of the four earliest issues.

== Publications and products ==
=== Magazines ===
- Found Magazine #1 (June 2001, 80 pages)
- Found Magazine #2 (Winter 2002, 112 pages)
- Found Magazine #3 (March 2004, 96 pages)
- Found Magazine #4 (September 2005, 96 pages)
- Found Magazine #5 (September 2007, 96 pages)
- Found Magazine #6 (December 2008, 96 pages)
- Found Magazine #7 (January 2010, 96 pages)
- Found Magazine #8 (October 2012, 96 pages)
- Found Magazine #9 (December 2013, 96 pages)
- FOUND: After Dark #1 (December 2015, 96 pages)
- Dirty Found #1 (December 2004, 80 pages)
- Dirty Found #2 (November 2005, 80 pages)
- Dirty Found #3 (March 2007, 80 pages)

=== Books ===
- Rothbart, Davy (April 27, 2004). Found: The Best Lost, Tossed, and Forgotten Items. Fireside. ISBN 978-0-7432-5114-3.
- Rothbart, Davy (May 2, 2006). Found II: More of the Best Lost, Tossed, and Forgotten Items. Fireside. ISBN 978-0-7432-7307-7.
- Bitner, Jason (November 7, 2006). Found Polaroids. Quack!Media. ISBN 978-0-7560-0606-8.
- Rothbart, Davy (May 5, 2009). Found: Requiem for a Paper Bag. Fireside. ISBN 978-1-4165-6054-8.
- Rothbart, Davy (October 10, 2014). Found Magazine: The Early Years. Quack!Media. ISBN 978-0-9800890-1-1.

=== Audio ===
- The Booty Don't Stop CD
- The Found 7"
