= Davy Rothbart =

American writer and filmmaker (born 1975)

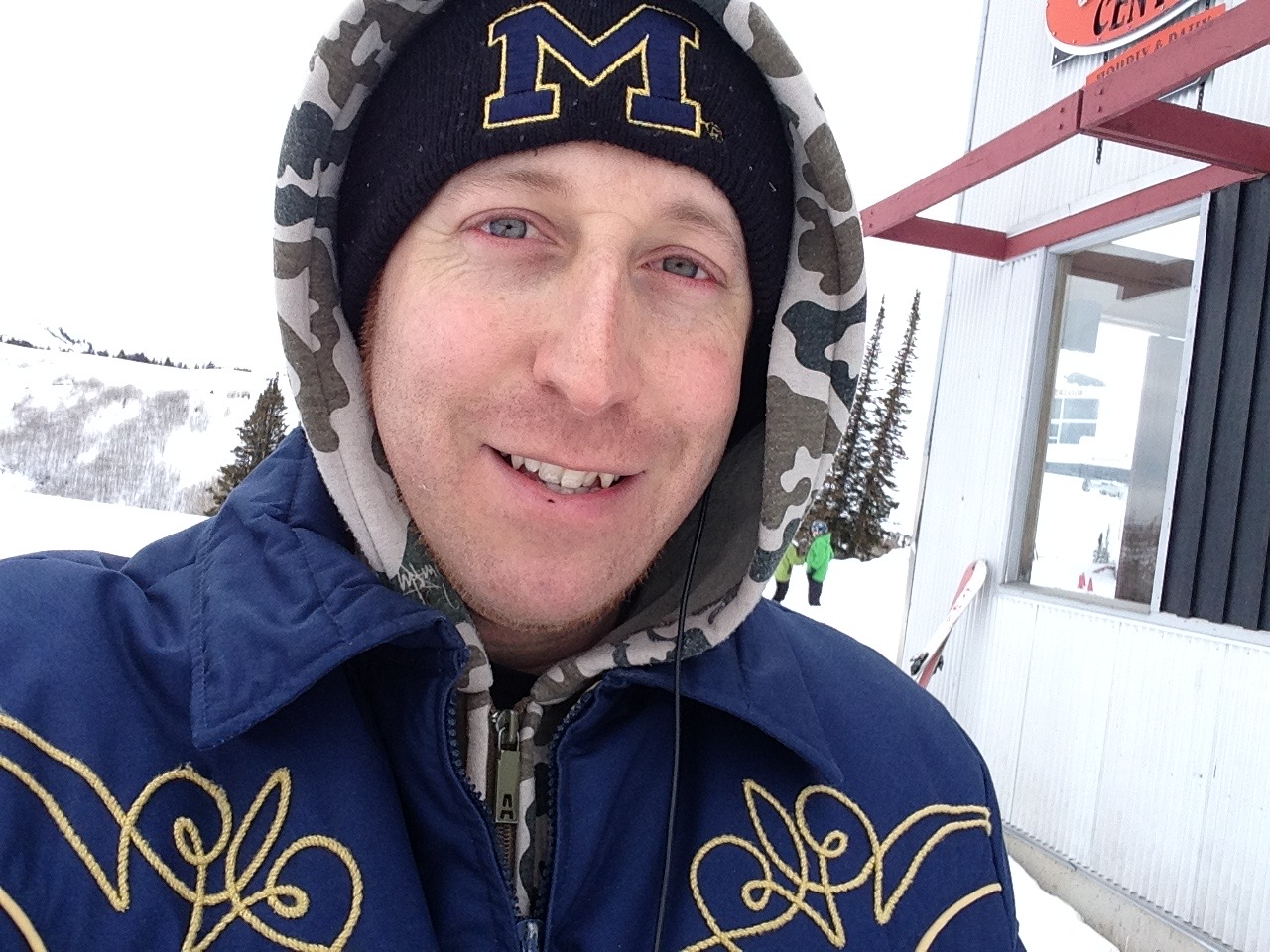
- Rothbart in 2015
- Born: David Ira Rothbart; April 11, 1975 (age 51)
- Education: University of Michigan
- Occupations: Author, filmmaker, journalist
- Website: www.foundmagazine.com

David Ira Rothbart (born April 11, 1975) is an American author, filmmaker, contributor to This American Life, and the editor/publisher of Found Magazine.

== Career ==
Davy Rothbart's magazine Found is dedicated to discarded notes, letters, flyers, photos, lists, and drawings found and sent in by readers. The magazine spawned a book, Found: The Best Lost, Tossed, and Forgotten Items from Around the World, published in April 2004. A second collection was published in May 2006, a third in May 2009. The magazine is published annually and co-edited by Rothbart's friend Sarah Locke.

Rothbart, a former Chicago Bulls ticket scalper, often tours the country to share finds and invite others to share their finds with him. His brother, musician Peter Rothbart, often accompanies him on these tours. In 2004, as he was on a tour to promote the Found book, he appeared twice on the television program the Late Show with David Letterman on CBS. He has since been featured on 20/20, MSNBC, and Last Call with Carson Daly, among other national TV and radio shows, and been profiled in The New Yorker and The New York Times.

Rothbart has toured the U.S. with his live spoken-word show, reading from Found Magazine and his own books of stories and essays.

In 2014, Found The Musical opened off-Broadway at David Mamet and William H. Macy's Atlantic Theater Company in New York City for a 12-week run. The play, written by Lee Overtree and Hunter Bell, with songs by Eli Bolin and additional materials by the Story Pirates, starred Broadway vet Nick Blaemire as Davy, with Betsy Morgan, Barrett Wilbert Weed, Community's Danny Pudi, and Daniel Everidge.

== Writing and journalism ==
The Lone Surfer of Montana, Kansas, a collection of Rothbart's short stories, was published in August 2005 by Simon & Schuster. A shorter version of the same book was previously self-published by Rothbart's own production company, 21 Balloons Productions. An Italian edition, Il Surfista Solitario del Montana, was published in 2007 by Coniglio Editore.

In September 2012, Rothbart's book of personal essays, My Heart Is An Idiot, was released by Farrar, Straus and Giroux. The book, which details Rothbart's lost loves and longtime life on the road. Upon the book's publication, Rothbart began a North American tour. The paperback version was released by Picador in September 2013. In Italy, the book was published by Baldini & Castoldi in 2014 as Il Cuore è Idiota.

When Fred Rogers of the PBS television program Mister Rogers' Neighborhood died in February 2003, The New York Times ran an Op-Ed by Rothbart about his childhood encounters with Rogers similar to his story on This American Life. Rothbart's other work on This American Life includes stories about his deaf mother, Barbara Brodsky, a channeler and meditation teacher; a longtime friend seeking advice about an unplanned pregnancy; and his Chicago ticket scalping career. Rothbart also writes for GQ, The Believer, New York Magazine, Grantland, Dwell, SLAM Magazine, Maxim, and The Sun, and has a recurring column in Los Angeles Magazine.

In February 2013, TED released Rothbart's e-book How Did You End Up Here?: The Surprising Ways Our Questions Connect Us.

At the University of Michigan, Rothbart won the Arthur Miller Award, the Lawrence Kasdan Scholarship, and nine Hopwood Awards.

== Film ==
In December 2006, Geffen Records released Rothbart's documentary film How We Survive about the punk rock band Rise Against on a DVD called Generation Lost. His second Rise Against documentary, Another Station: Another Mile, which follows the band as they write songs for a new album and perform shows around the world, was released in October 2010. In May 2011, Rothbart directed a behind-the-scenes featurette for ItGetsBetter.org about the making of Rise Against's "Make It Stop" video, which was nominated for a MTV Video Music Award.

In 2008, Easier with Practice, a film based on an article Rothbart wrote for GQ about his life on tour, was shot in Albuquerque, New Mexico. The movie, written and directed by Kyle Patrick Alvarez, stars Brian Geraghty as Davy and Kel O'Neill as Davy's brother; it premiered June 12, 2009 at the CineVegas Film Festival and was awarded the Grand Jury Prize by actor and festival chairman Dennis Hopper.

In January 2009, Rothbart filmed his first full-length narrative feature, Overhaul, which stars rapper Daniel "D Shot" Garvatt as a pizza driver in desperate circumstances on New Year's Eve. Rothbart himself delivered for Bell's Pizza in Ann Arbor, Michigan for six years. Overhaul was scheduled to be released in 2015.

From 2010 to 2012, Rothbart filmed a documentary called Medora, which follows a resilient high-school basketball team in the small, struggling town of Medora, Indiana. The film, co-directed by Rothbart and Andrew Cohn, premiered at SXSW in 2013 and was released in theaters in fall 2013. The film aired in April, 2014 on the acclaimed PBS series Independent Lens, earning an Emmy Award.

Rothbart is the subject of a documentary, directed by David Meiklejohn, called My Heart Is An Idiot, which premiered in April 2011, and screened in twenty U.S. cities that spring. He has also made token appearances as an actor, including a role as Miami night club manager Jake Sylvano in the film The Strongest Man, directed by Kenny Riches, which premiered in January, 2015 at the Sundance Film Festival.

In 2021, Rothbart's documentary 17 Blocks, which tracks the Sanford Family in Southeast Washington, D.C. over the course of 20 years, was released by MTV Documentary Films, executive produced by Sheila Nevins, with impact partners Black Lives Matter, D.C., and Everytown for Gun Safety.

Rothbart is the founder of Washington To Washington, an annual hiking adventure which brings inner-city kids from Washington, D.C., New Orleans, and Southeast Michigan to New Hampshire for a climb to the top of Mt. Washington. He directs the Found Magazine Prison Pen-Pal Program, connecting Found readers on the outside with those behind bars, and is also active with the youth writing programs 826 National, 826michigan, and 826LA.

== Personal life ==
A graduate of the alternative Community High School and the University of Michigan, Rothbart lives in Ann Arbor, Michigan and Los Angeles, California. His brother is photojournalist Michael Forster Rothbart.
