= Jordan Kessler =

American film producer

Jordan Kessler is an American film producer.

== Filmography ==
=== Producer ===
Year	Title	Role	Notes
2006	The Black Dahlia	Associate Producer	
2009	The Way of War	Executive Producer	
2009	Cummings Farm	Producer	
2010	Trance	Producer	
2010	Drones	Producer	
2010	Nine Dead	Executive Producer	
2011	Mama, I Want to Sing!	Co-Producer	
2012	Here Comes the Night	Producer	
2012	About Cherry	Producer	
2014	Life of Crime	Producer	
2014	Midnight Sex Run	Producer	

=== Actor ===
Year	Title	Role	Notes
1989	Parenthood	Matt	
