= Aviva Klompas =

Canadian-born educator and journalist

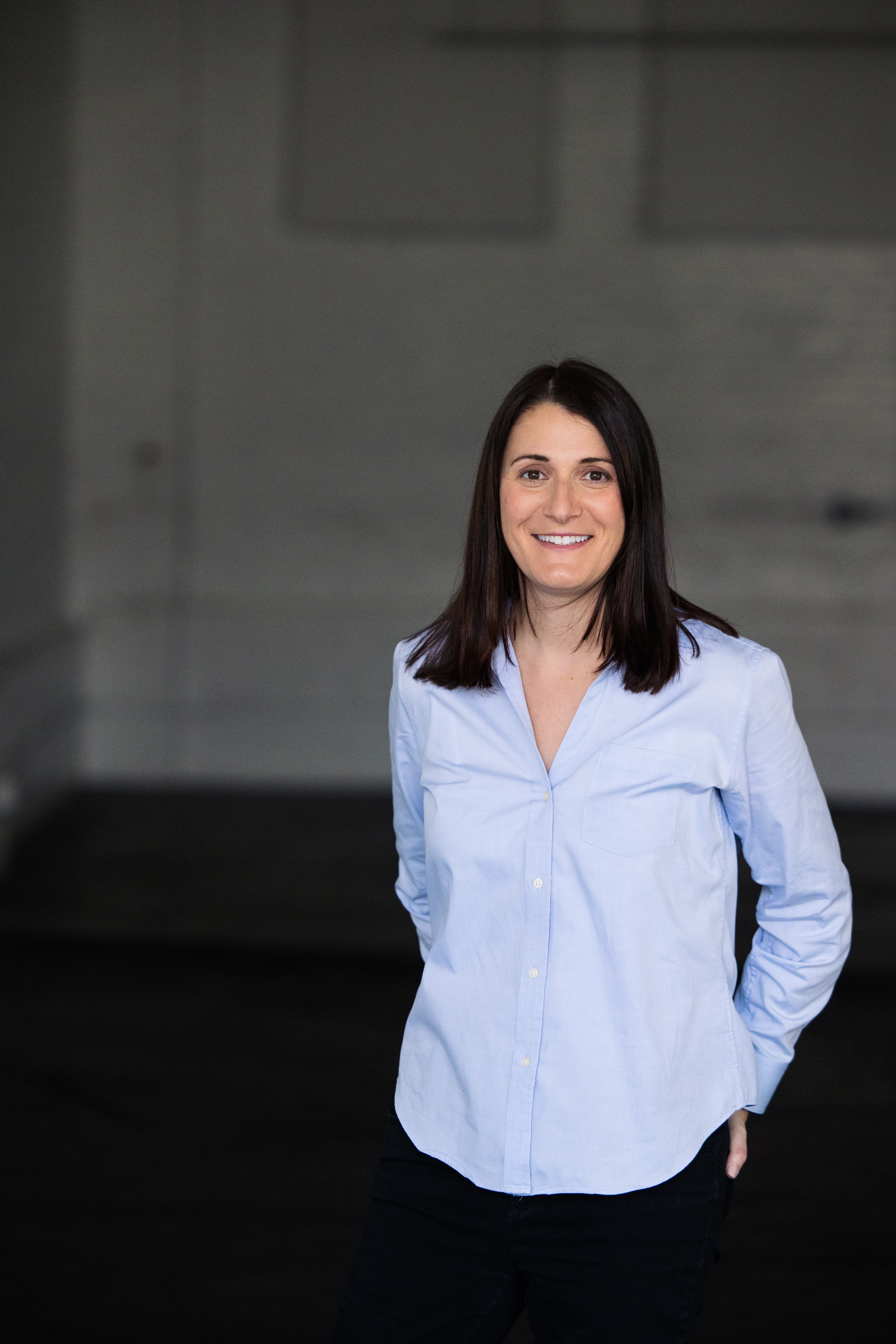
- Aviva Klompas
- Education: New York University
- Occupation: Educator

Aviva Klompas is a Canadian-American educator, author, and speech writer. She is the CEO of Boundless, a pro-Israel education group.

== Early life and education ==
Originally from Canada, Klompas earned an Honors Bachelor of Science from the University of Toronto, as well as a Masters of Public and Non-Profit Management and Policy from New York University. She has attributed her pro-Israel advocacy to the experience of leading Birthright trips.

== Career ==
Klompas worked as a Senior Policy Advisor in the Ontario government supporting efforts to resettle Syrian refugees in Canada. Klompas was the associate vice president of Israel and Global Jewish Citizenship at Combined Jewish Philanthropies. From 2013 to 2015, she was the speechwriter for Ron Prosor, Israel's ambassador to the United Nations.

She is the co-founder and CEO of Boundless, a think tank that states its goal as to "revitalize Israel education and take bold collective action to combat Jew-hatred."

Klompas is the author of 2 books: Speaking for Israel, a memoir about her time as director of speechwriting for Israel at the United Nations, and Stand-Up Nation: Israeli Resilience in the Wake of Disaster.

Klompas has written opinion pieces about Israel for several publications.

== Awards ==
Hadassah Magazine named Klompas as one of their “18 American Zionist Women You Should Know", while Algemeiner Journal named her one of the "Top 100 people positively influencing Jewish life." Klompas received a Voices of Iron from Dan Illouz for her Israel advocacy during the Swords of Iron war.
