= 7th Astra Film Awards =

Astra Film Awards

- Date: January 6, 2024
- Site: Biltmore Hotel, Los Angeles
- Hosted by: Rick Glassman
- Official website: hollywoodcreative.org

Highlights
- Best Picture: Barbie
- Most awards: Barbie (5)
- Most nominations: Barbie (10)

Television coverage
- Network: ABS-CBN News; KNEKT Television Network; YouTube (@HollywoodCreativeAlliance)

The 7th Astra Film Awards, presented by the Hollywood Creative Alliance, took place on January 6, 2024, at the Biltmore Hotel in Los Angeles. It was produced by Content.23 Media, DIGA Studios, and Vox Productions. The nominations were announced live on the official HCA YouTube channel on December 7, 2023.

The fantasy comedy Barbie led the nominations with ten, followed by The Holdovers with seven, and Oppenheimer and Spider-Man: Across the Spider-Verse with six each. Barbie ultimately won the most awards with five wins, including Best Picture and Best Actress (Margot Robbie).

The live-streamed event was broadcast globally, beginning at 6:30 p.m. PDT/9:30 p.m. EDT; Jimmy O. Yang was originally slated to serve as host, but was replaced by Rick Glassman. The organization also announced a new partnership with ABS-CBN, who served as the global broadcast partner for the HCA Astra Film Awards and HCA Astra TV Awards. Both ceremonies aired in 247 countries and territories in addition to the live-stream on HCA's YouTube channel and KNEKT.tv.

Additionally, the Astra Film Creative Arts Awards winners were announced on the same day; the ceremony took place on February 26, 2024, at City Market Social House in Los Angeles.

== Ceremony information ==
This year, several months after the Hollywood Critics Association rebranded itself as the Hollywood Creative Alliance (HCA), the organization had given its signature awards shows a new title: "The Astra Awards". The decision to rename the awards ceremonies was put to a vote by the HCA's advisory committee on November 17, 2023.

"As the Hollywood Creative Alliance expands to include creatives and other industry professionals, we wanted an award name that would be reflective of the newly relaunched organization," said HCA CEO Scott Menzel in a statement. "The name 'Astra' is a perfect award show title evoking celestial brilliance and creative mastery. It encapsulates the collaborative spirit, symbolizing individual stars and elegantly embodies the industry's aspiration, innovation, and distinction. This new name symbolizes unity amongst the diverse and inclusive membership of the Hollywood Creative Alliance."

Furthermore, the HCA announced its collaboration with producer and editor David Sandeep Robert, filmmaker Jason Strickland, and executive producer Leonard Shapiro to drive change and ensure that the work of stunt performers and international actors are acknowledged and celebrated on a global scale. In addition to advocating for stunt performers, the Hollywood Creative Alliance had also announced that it will add three new International categories to the upcoming ceremony: Best International Actor, Best International Actress, and Best International Filmmaker. "International Cinema is important to so many of us within the HCA, and we have decided to add additional categories that will allow International titles and performers to get more exposure," adds HCA Vice Chair Yong Chavez. "The HCA has always been an organization that has shown great pride in uplifting marginalized voices, and so many International actors are overlooked by awards organizations here in the US."

== Winners and nominees ==
Winners are listed first and highlighted with boldface.

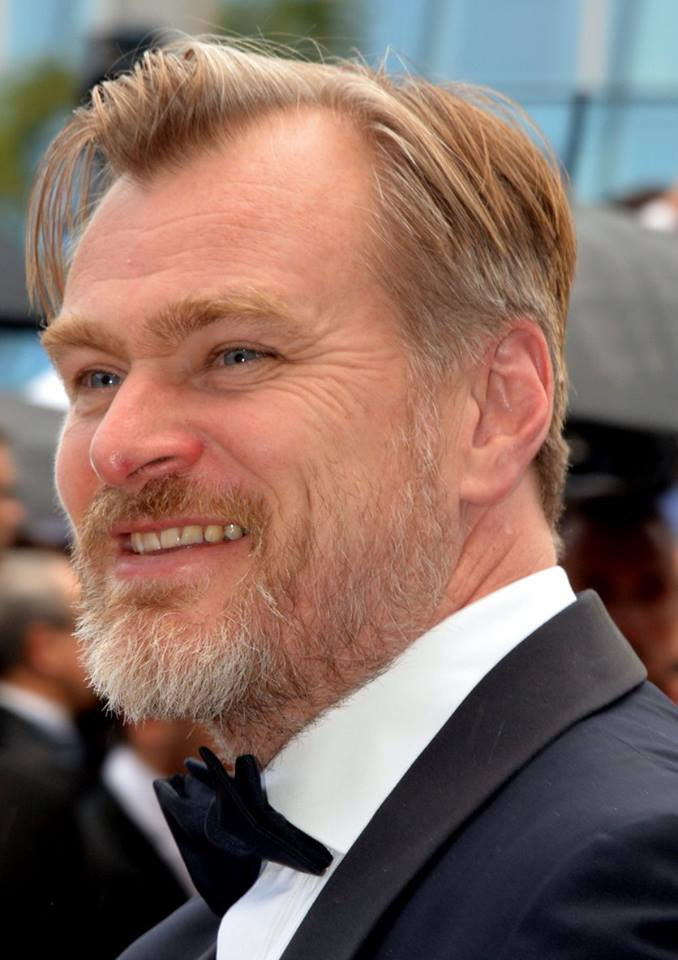
Christopher Nolan, Best Director winner

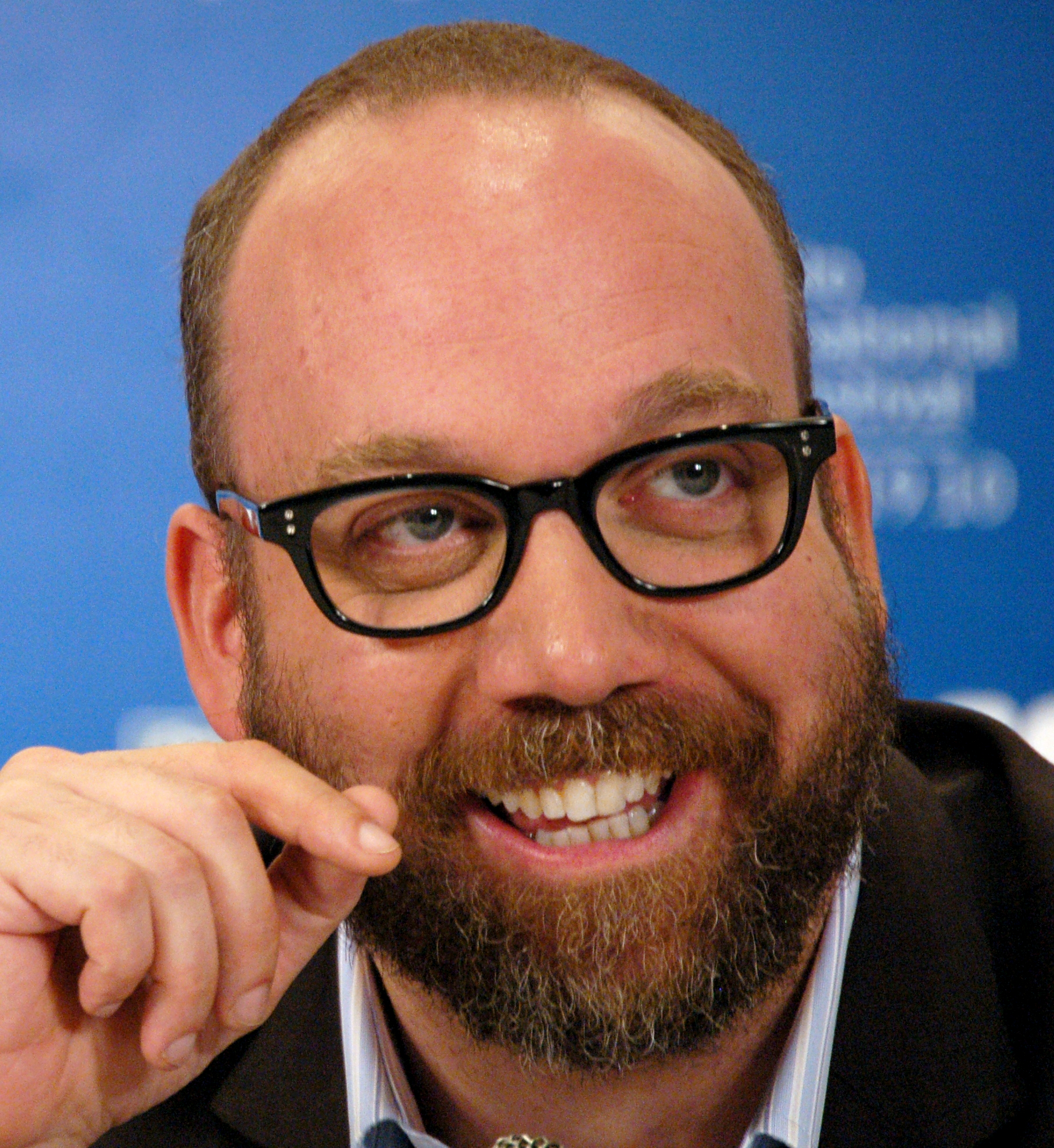
Paul Giamatti, Best Actor winner

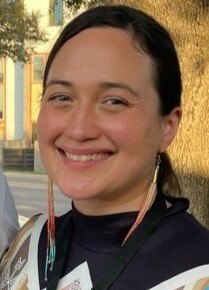
Lily Gladstone, Best Actress co-winner

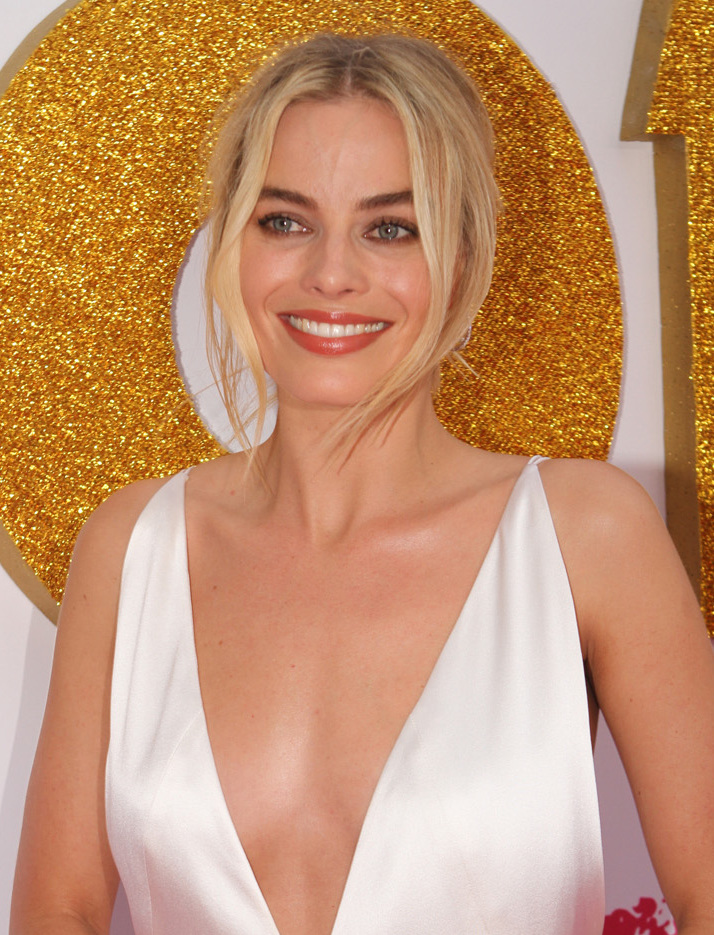
Margot Robbie, Best Actress co-winner

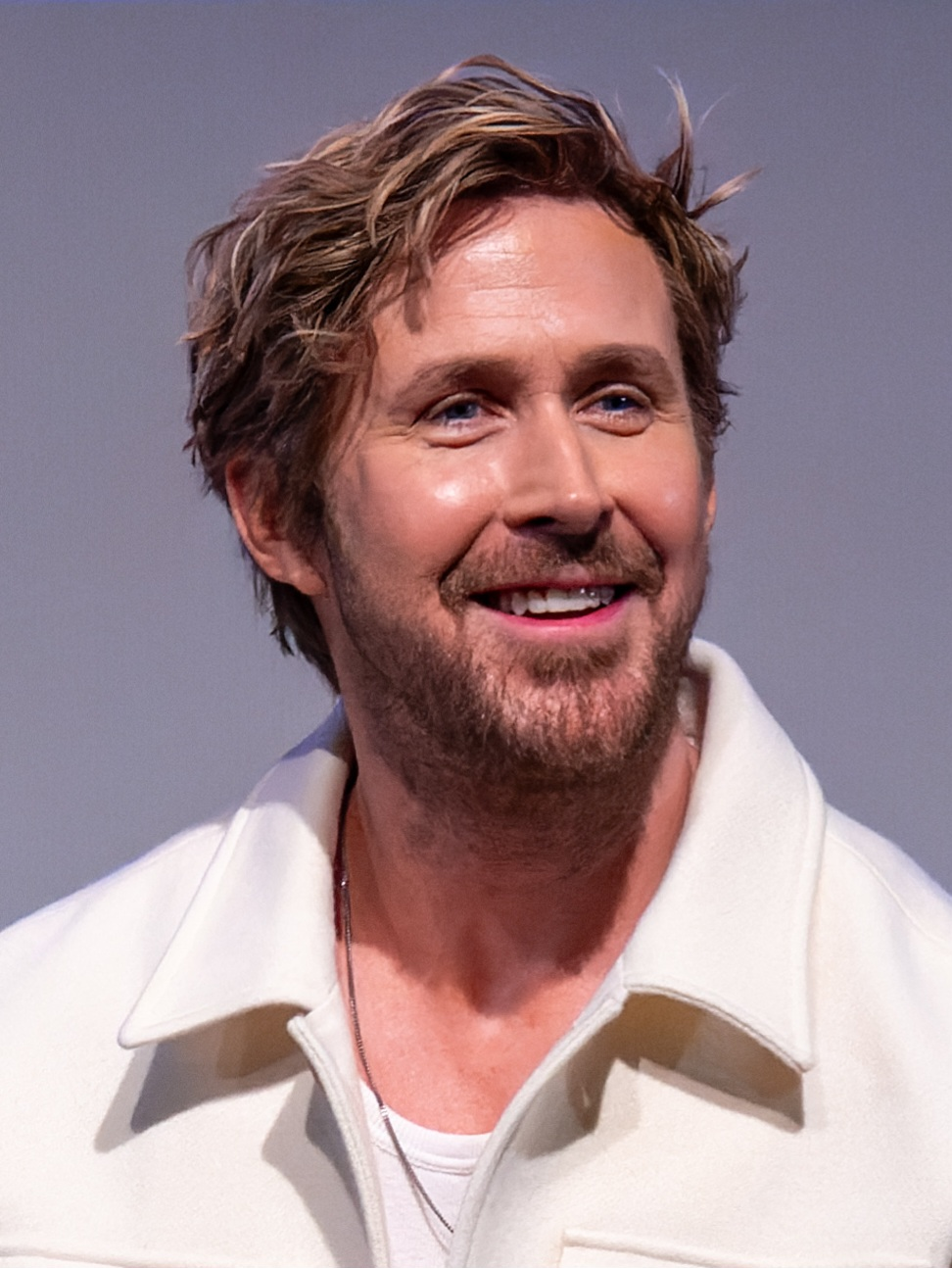
Ryan Gosling, Best Supporting Actor winner and Best Original Song co-winner

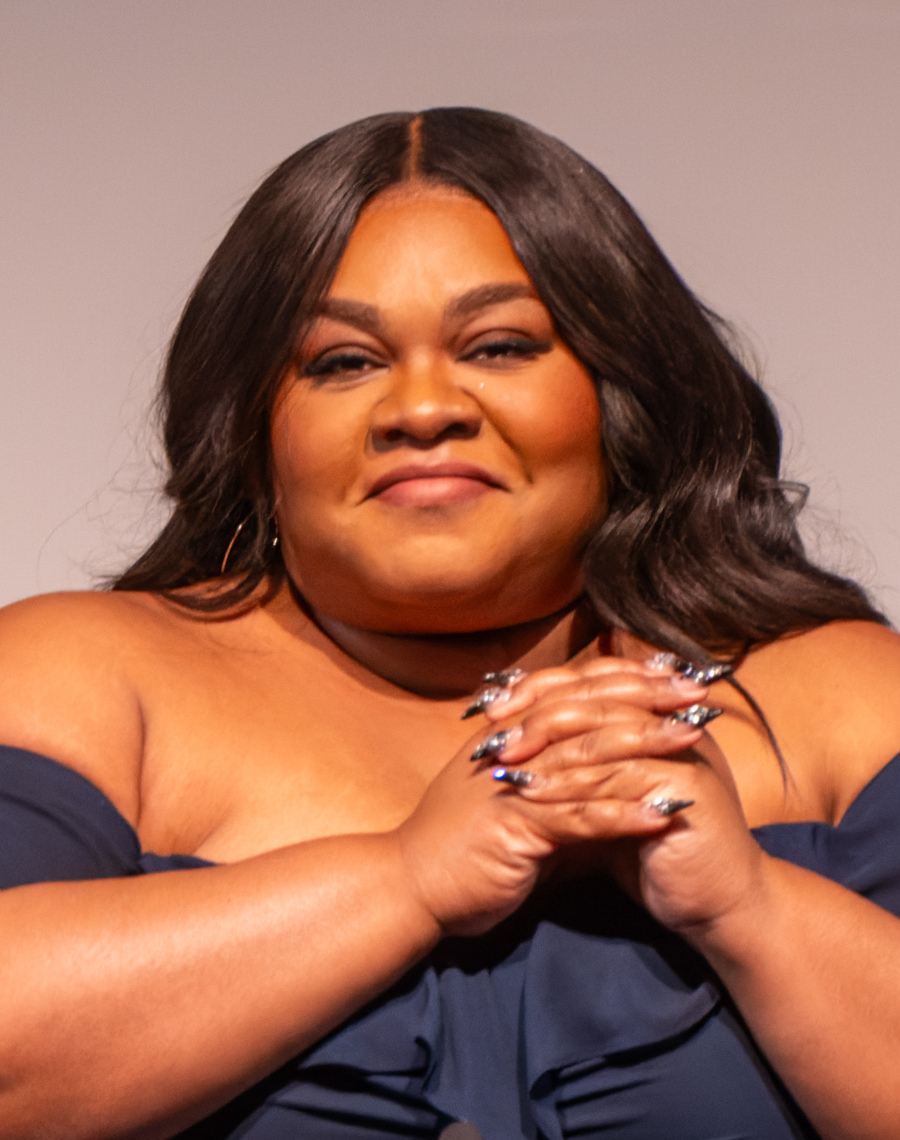
Da'Vine Joy Randolph, Best Supporting Actress winner

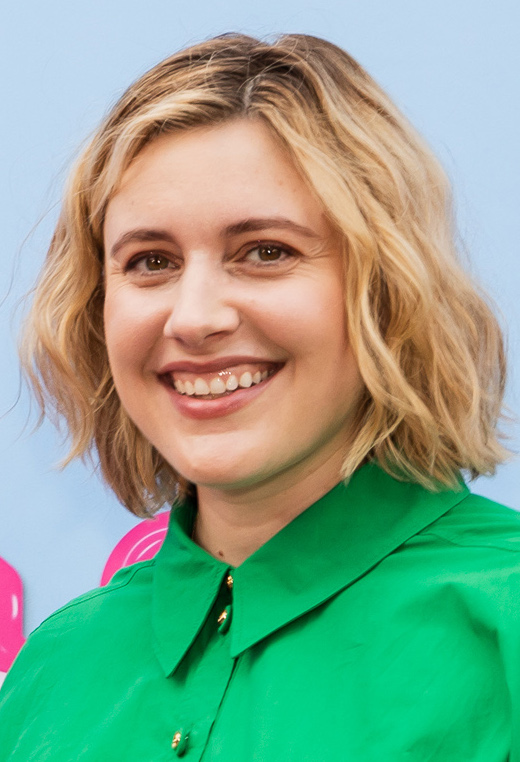
Greta Gerwig, Best Original Screenplay co-winner

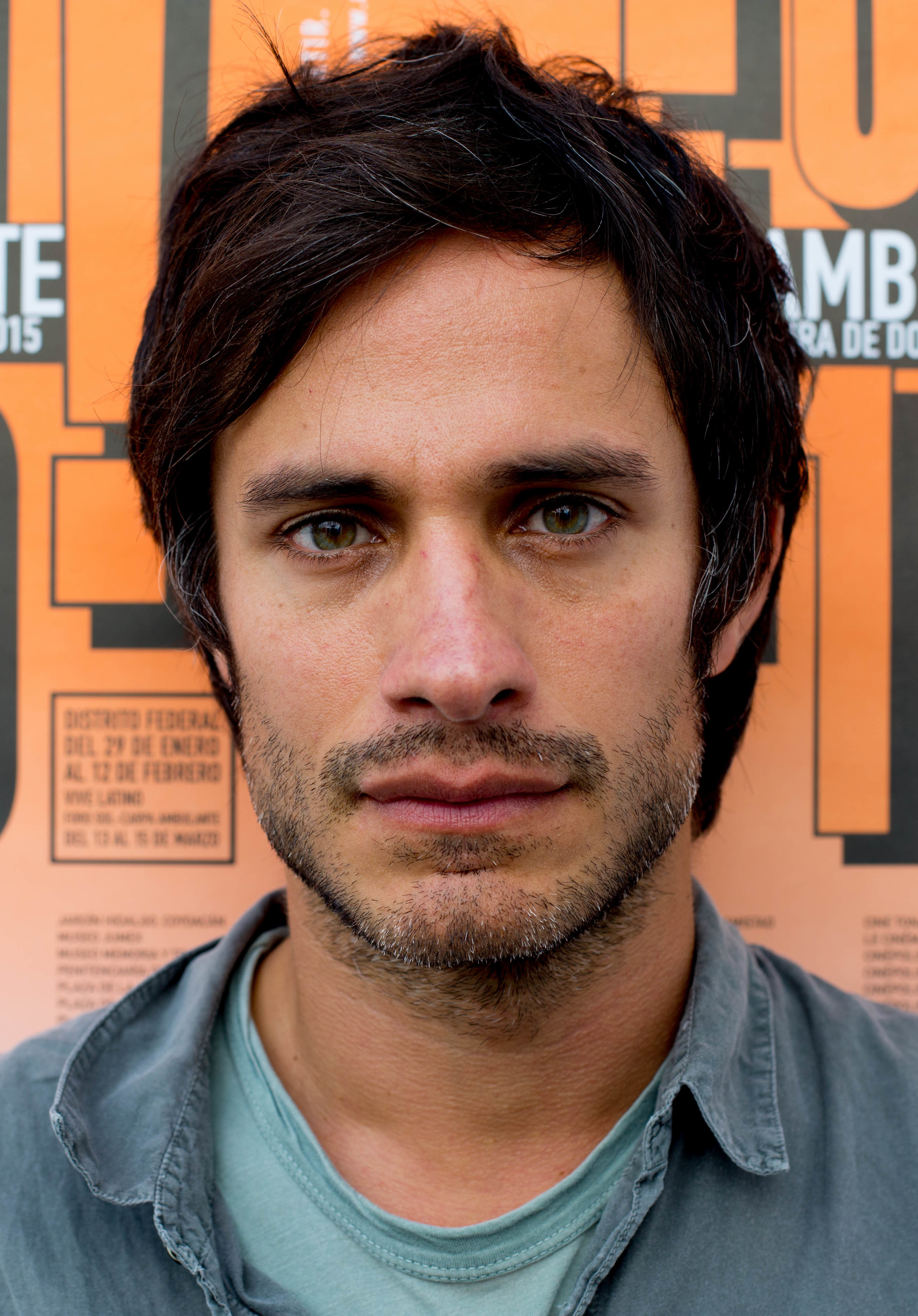
Gael García Bernal, Best International Actor winner

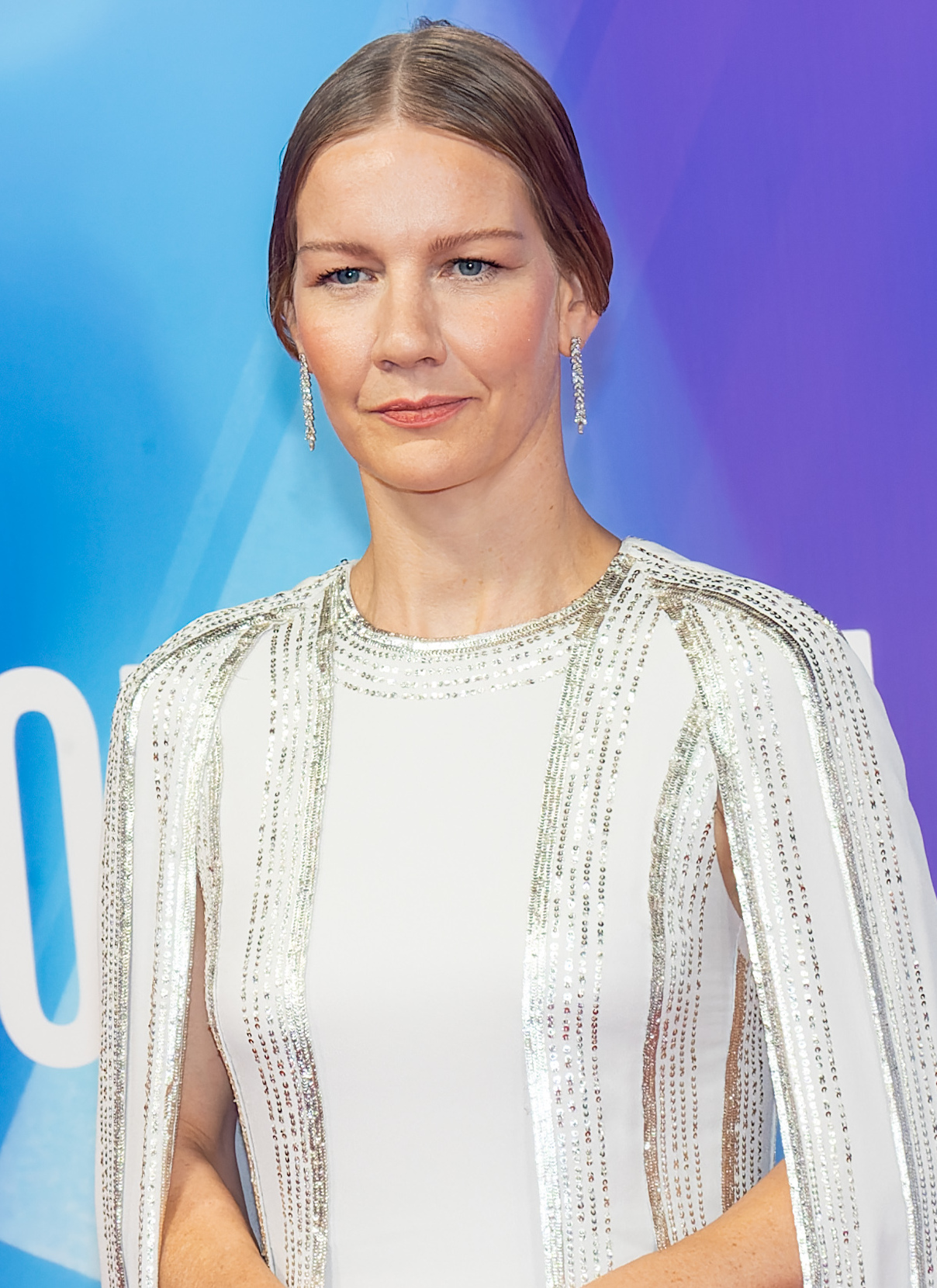
Sandra Hüller, Best International Actress winner

**Best Picture**: **Barbie (Warner Bros. Pictures)**; Air (Amazon MGM Studios); American Fiction (Orion Pictures / Amazon MGM Studios); The Color Purple (Warner Bros. Pictures); The Holdovers (Focus Features); Killers of the Flower Moon (Apple Original Films); Maestro (Netflix); Oppenheimer (Universal Pictures); Past Lives (A24); Spider-Man: Across the Spider-Verse (Sony Pictures)	**Best Director**: **Christopher Nolan – Oppenheimer**; Ben Affleck – Air; Bradley Cooper – Maestro; Emerald Fennell – Saltburn; Greta Gerwig – Barbie; Cord Jefferson – American Fiction; Yorgos Lanthimos – Poor Things; Alexander Payne – The Holdovers; Martin Scorsese – Killers of the Flower Moon; Celine Song – Past Lives
**Best Actor**: **Paul Giamatti – The Holdovers as Paul Hunham**; Bradley Cooper – Maestro as Leonard Bernstein; Colman Domingo – Rustin as Bayard Rustin; Barry Keoghan – Saltburn as Oliver Quick; Cillian Murphy – Oppenheimer as J. Robert Oppenheimer; Jeffrey Wright – American Fiction as Thelonious "Monk" Ellison	**Best Actress**: **Lily Gladstone – Killers of the Flower Moon as Mollie Burkhart (TIE)**; **Margot Robbie – Barbie as Barbie (TIE)**; Fantasia Barrino – The Color Purple as Celie Harris-Johnson; Greta Lee – Past Lives as Nora Moon; Carey Mulligan – Maestro as Felicia Montealegre; Emma Stone – Poor Things as Bella Baxter
**Best Supporting Actor**: **Ryan Gosling – Barbie as Ken**; Colman Domingo – The Color Purple as Albert "Mister" Johnson; Robert Downey Jr. – Oppenheimer as Lewis Strauss; Glenn Howerton – BlackBerry as Jim Balsillie; Charles Melton – May December as Joe Yoo; Dominic Sessa – The Holdovers as Angus Tully	**Best Supporting Actress**: **Da'Vine Joy Randolph – The Holdovers as Mary Lamb**; Danielle Brooks – The Color Purple as Sofia; Viola Davis – Air as Deloris Jordan; America Ferrera – Barbie as Gloria; Rachel McAdams – Are You There God? It's Me, Margaret. as Barbara Simon; Julianne Moore – May December as Gracie Atherton-Yoo
**Best Original Screenplay**: **Barbie – Greta Gerwig and Noah Baumbach**; Air – Alex Convery; Anatomy of a Fall – Justine Triet and Arthur Harari; The Holdovers – David Hemingson; Past Lives – Celine Song; Saltburn – Emerald Fennell	**Best Adapted Screenplay**: **American Fiction – Cord Jefferson**; Are You There God? It's Me, Margaret. – Kelly Fremon Craig; Killers of the Flower Moon – Eric Roth and Martin Scorsese; Oppenheimer – Christopher Nolan; Poor Things – Tony McNamara; Spider-Man: Across the Spider-Verse – Phil Lord, Christopher Miller, and Dave Callaham
**Best Cast Ensemble**: **The Color Purple**; Air; Barbie; The Holdovers; Killers of the Flower Moon; Oppenheimer	**Best Voice-Over Performance**: **Hailee Steinfeld – Spider-Man: Across the Spider-Verse as Gwen Stacy / Spider-Gwen**; Jack Black as Bowser – The Super Mario Bros. Movie; Bradley Cooper – Guardians of the Galaxy Vol. 3 as Rocket; Ariana DeBose – Wish as Asha; Daniel Kaluuya – Spider-Man: Across the Spider-Verse as Hobie Brown / Spider-Punk; Shameik Moore – Spider-Man: Across the Spider-Verse as Miles Morales / Spider-Man
**Best Action Feature**: **John Wick: Chapter 4**; Creed III; Dungeons & Dragons: Honor Among Thieves; Guardians of the Galaxy Vol. 3; The Killer; Mission: Impossible – Dead Reckoning Part One	**Best Animated Feature**: **Spider-Man: Across the Spider-Verse**; The Boy and the Heron; Elemental; Nimona; Suzume; Teenage Mutant Ninja Turtles: Mutant Mayhem
**Best Comedy Feature**: **Are You There God? It's Me, Margaret.**; BlackBerry; Bottoms; Joy Ride; No Hard Feelings; Theater Camp	**Best Documentary Feature**: **Still: A Michael J. Fox Movie**; 20 Days in Mariupol; American Symphony; Beyond Utopia; Little Richard: I Am Everything; Taylor Swift: The Eras Tour
**Best Horror Feature**: **M3GAN**; Evil Dead Rise; Knock at the Cabin; No One Will Save You; Scream VI; Talk to Me	**Best First Feature**: **Celine Song – Past Lives**; Chloe Domont – Fair Play; Cord Jefferson – American Fiction; Michael B. Jordan – Creed III; Adele Lim – Joy Ride; A. V. Rockwell – A Thousand and One
**Best International Feature**: **Anatomy of a Fall (France)**; Concrete Utopia (South Korea); Fallen Leaves (Finland); Jawan (India); Perfect Days (Japan); Radical (Mexico); Society of the Snow (Spain); The Taste of Things (France); The Teachers' Lounge (Germany); The Zone of Interest (United Kingdom)	**Best International Filmmaker**: **Hayao Miyazaki – The Boy and the Heron**; J. A. Bayona – Society of the Snow; Jonathan Glazer – The Zone of Interest; Trần Anh Hùng – The Taste of Things; Justine Triet – Anatomy of a Fall; Wim Wenders – Perfect Days
**Best International Actor**: **Gael García Bernal – Cassandro as Cassandro / Saúl Armendáriz**; Eugenio Derbez – Radical as Sergio; Christian Friedel – The Zone of Interest as Rudolf Höss; Mads Mikkelsen – The Promised Land as Ludvig Kahlen; Enzo Vogrincic – Society of the Snow as Numa Turcatti; Koji Yakusho – Perfect Days as Hirayama	**Best International Actress**: **Sandra Hüller – Anatomy of a Fall as Sandra Voyter**; Leonie Benesch – The Teachers' Lounge as Carla Nowak; Juliette Binoche – The Taste of Things as Eugénie; Roberta Colindrez – Cassandro as Sabrina; Layla Mohammadi – The Persian Version as Leila; Alma Pöysti – Fallen Leaves as Ansa
**Best Short Film**: **The After**; The ABCs of Book Banning; The Last Repair Shop; Once Upon a Studio; Strange Way of Life; The Wonderful Story of Henry Sugar	**Best Stunts**: **John Wick: Chapter 4**; Dungeons & Dragons: Honor Among Thieves; Fast X; Guardians of the Galaxy Vol. 3; Mission: Impossible – Dead Reckoning Part One; Polite Society
**Best Original Song**: **"I'm Just Ken" from Barbie – Written by Mark Ronson and Andrew Wyatt; Performed by Ryan Gosling**; "Camp Isn't Home" from Theater Camp – Written by Ben Platt, Noah Galvin, Molly Gordon, Nick Lieberman, and Mark Sonnenblick; Performed by Ben Platt, Molly Gordon, Noah Galvin, Alexander Bello, Bailee Bonick, Donovan Colan, Jack Sobolewski, Kyndra Sanchez, Luke Islam, Madisen Lora, and Quinn Titcomb; "Dance the Night" from Barbie – Written by Mark Ronson, Andrew Wyatt, Dua Lipa, and Caroline Ailin; Performed by Dua Lipa; "Peaches" from The Super Mario Bros. Movie – Written by Jack Black, Aaron Horvath, Michael Jelenic, Eric Osmond, and John Spiker; Performed by Jack Black; "This Wish" from Wish – Written by Julia Michaels, Benjamin Rice, and JP Saxe; Performed by Ariana DeBose; "What Was I Made For?" from Barbie – Written by Billie Eilish and Finneas O'Connell; Performed by Billie Eilish

== Honorary awards ==
- Game Changer Award – Glenn Howerton
- Acting Achievement Award – Jeffrey Wright
- Excellence in Artistry Award – Willem Dafoe
- Star on the Rise Award – Abby Ryder Fortson
- Filmmaking Achievement Award – J. A. Bayona
- Independent Filmmaker Award – Savanah Leaf
- Artisan Achievement Award – Daniel Pemberton
- Publicist of the Year Award – Marshall Weinbaum
- Breakthrough Performer Award – Danielle Brooks
- Spotlight Award – Chad Stahelski and the stunt team of John Wick: Chapter 4
- Impact Award – SAG-AFTRA and WGA strike of 2023; seven honorees from SAG-AFTRA and WGA's negotiating team and strike photographers were honored: Ellen Stutzman (WGA Chief Negotiator), Fran Drescher (SAG-AFTRA President), Adam Conover (WGA Negotiating Committee & SAG-AFTRA member), Duncan Crabtree-Ireland (SAG-AFTRA National Executive Director & Chief Negotiator), Jack E. Herman (strike photographer, SAG-AFTRA member) J.W. Hendricks (strike photographer, Pre WGA), and Jerry Jerome (strike photographer), all of whom helped shape the future of the entertainment industry through their actions in the negotiation room, on the picket line, and through social media.

== Films with multiple wins ==
The following films received multiple awards:

Wins	Film
5	Barbie
2	Anatomy of a Fall
2	The Holdovers
2	John Wick: Chapter 4
2	Spider-Man: Across the Spider-Verse

== Films with multiple nominations ==
The following films received multiple nominations:

Nominations	Film
10	Barbie
7	The Holdovers
6	Oppenheimer
6	Spider-Man: Across the Spider-Verse
5	Air
5	American Fiction
5	The Color Purple
5	Killers of the Flower Moon
5	Past Lives
4	Anatomy of a Fall
4	Maestro
3	Are You There God? It's Me, Margaret.
3	Guardians of the Galaxy Vol. 3
3	Perfect Days
3	Poor Things
3	Saltburn
3	Society of the Snow
3	The Taste of Things
3	The Zone of Interest
2	BlackBerry
2	The Boy and the Heron
2	Cassandro
2	Creed III
2	Dungeons & Dragons: Honor Among Thieves
2	Fallen Leaves
2	John Wick: Chapter 4
2	Joy Ride
2	May December
2	Mission: Impossible – Dead Reckoning Part One
2	Radical
2	The Super Mario Bros. Movie
2	The Teachers' Lounge
2	Theater Camp
2	Wish

== See also ==
- 3rd Astra TV Awards
- 2nd Astra Film Creative Arts Awards
- 6th Hollywood Critics Association Midseason Film Awards
