= Theater Camp (soundtrack) =

2023 soundtrack album

Theater Camp: Original Motion Picture Soundtrack

Soundtrack album by Ben Platt, Noah Galvin, Molly Gordon, Nick Lieberman and the cast of Theater Camp
- Released: July 14, 2023
- Recorded: 2022–2023
- Genre: Film soundtrack; musical theatre
- Length: 22:34
- Label: Interscope

Ben Platt chronology
Dear Evan Hansen (2021)	Theater Camp: Original Motion Picture Soundtrack (2023)	Honeymind (2024)

Theater Camp: Original Motion Picture Soundtrack is the soundtrack to the 2023 film of the same name directed by Molly Gordon and Nick Lieberman, released on July 14, 2023 by Interscope Records. The album consisted the original songs written by Gordon, Lieberman, Ben Platt and Noah Galvin and performed by the cast members. James McAlister and Mark Sonnenblick underscored the incidental music.

== Development ==
The music in Theater Camp were based on the fictional in-film musical Joan, Still that was underscored by the composers McCallister and Sonnenblick. Platt, who wrote songs for his musical albums described that he made his foray into writing a song for full-fledged musical performances. He co-wrote most of the songs with his partner Galvin, Gordon and Lieberman. The latter, said that he did not have a musical book specifically for the fictional musical, and creating the same with composers were challenging, who allotted three days for the musical performance.

The songs were originally written in full. However, those were partially appeared in the film with some of those songs had been excluded; those songs along with several bonus pieces were included in the soundtrack. The team improvised those songs in order to be included in the final edit.

== Critical reception ==
Variety's Peter Debruge praised the original songs about the films' fictional character Joan Rubinsky and the film itself, being "catchy" and "clever". Praising the mockumentary style, Christy Lemire of RogerEbert.com attributed that "the lyrics to some of the original songs are hilariously terrible." Associated Press claimed that with its music, the film "hits just the right note between satire and sincere". Tim Grierson, writing for Screen International commented: "What's strongest here are the original songs that go into the climactic debut of Joan, Still [...] The directors, who were part of the team that wrote the songs, make even the dopiest tune feel like these teachers' idea of Broadway excellence, and the chasm between the characters' delusion and reality is often quite charming." David Rooney of The Hollywood Reporter wrote "Its songs have some of the silliest lyrics imaginable, but the kids in the cast (plus one surprise adult star) sing the hell out of them and somehow, they're almost catchy. It's simultaneously a mess and inspired." Esther Zuckerman of Vanity Fair complimented the original music saying that it "strike a perfect balance between intentionally amateurish and earwormy".

== Track listing ==
Theater Camp: Original Motion Picture Soundtrack
No.	Title	Performer(s)	Length
1.	"Troy's Intro"	Jimmy Tatro	0:14
2.	"Joan, Still Theme"	Alexander Bello; Bailee Bonick; Donovan Colan; Jack Sobolewski; Kyndra Sanchez; Luke Islam; Madisen Lora; Quinn Titcomb	0:46
3.	"Narrator's Prologue"	Sobolewski	0:12
4.	"Women Cannot Read"	Colan; Bonick; Bello; Sobolewski; Sanchez; Islam; Lora; Titcomb	3:43
5.	"The Wall Street Noise"	Noah Galvin; Bonick; Colan; Sobolewski; Sanchez; Islam; Lora; Titcomb; Bello	3:02
6.	"Joan's Lament"	Galvin	0:17
7.	"No Tomorrow"	Galvin; Bello; Colan; Bonick; Sobolewski; Sanchez; Islam; Lora; Titcomb	4:11
8.	"Son Salutation"	Galvin; Sanchez	1:49
9.	"Narrator's Epilogue"	Sobolewski	0:24
10.	"Camp Isn't Home"	Galvin; Molly Gordon; Bello; Bonick; Colan; Sobolewski; Sanchez; Islam; Lora; Titcomb	3:43
11.	"Bonus track: Show Announcements"	Platt; Gordon	1:55
12.	"Bonus track: 'Peters, Foster, Streisand, Lupone'"	Bello; Islam	0:15
13.	"Bonus track: Auditions"	Bonick; Gordon; Nathan Lee Graham; Jonathan Lengel; Platt; Owen Thiele; Titcomb	1:19
14.	"Bonus track: 'Bye Class'"	Gordon	0:44

== Chart performance ==
Chart performance for Theater Camp
Chart (2012)	Peak position
UK Soundtrack Albums (OCC)	43
US Soundtrack Albums (Billboard)	22

== Accolades ==
"Camp Isn't Home" was poised to be in contention for the Academy Award for Best Original Song at the 96th Academy Awards, according to Variety, the Los Angeles Times, and IndieWire, with Billboard predicting it would be one of the frontrunners for the category.
