= 39th Independent Spirit Awards =

US film awards ceremony in 2024

39th Film Independent Spirit Awards
- Awarded for: Best in independent film and independent television
- Date: February 25, 2024
- Site: Santa Monica Pier; Santa Monica, California, U.S.
- Hosted by: Aidy Bryant

Highlights
- Best Feature: Past Lives
- Most awards: Film: The Holdovers (3); TV: Beef / The Last of Us (2)
- Most nominations: Film: American Fiction / May December / Past Lives (5); TV: I'm a Virgo (4)

Television coverage
- Network: YouTube (through @filmindependent + @imdb)

The 39th Film Independent Spirit Awards, honoring the best independent films and television series of 2023, were presented by Film Independent on February 25, 2024. The ceremony took place at the Santa Monica Pier in Santa Monica, California, and was hosted by American actress and comedian Aidy Bryant. For the second year in a row, the ceremony was streamed live on the YouTube channels of both IMDb and Film Independent, among other social media platforms.

The nominations were announced live via YouTube on December 5, 2023, by actors Joel Kim Booster and Natalie Morales. American Fiction, May December, and Past Lives led the film nominations, with five each, followed by The Holdovers and Passages with four apiece. For the television categories, I'm a Virgo and The Last of Us received the most nominations with four each.

The grant recipients of the Emerging Filmmakers Awards were announced on January 6, 2024.

== Expansion ==
This year, Film Independent added a new category: Best Breakthrough Performance in a New Scripted Series. The move evens the number of performance categories for film and television; three on the film side (Best Lead Performance, Best Supporting Performance, and Best Breakthrough Performance) and three on the television side (Best Lead Performance in a New Scripted Series, Best Supporting Performance in a New Scripted Series, and Best Breakthrough Performance in a New Scripted Series).

== Winners and nominees ==
=== Film ===
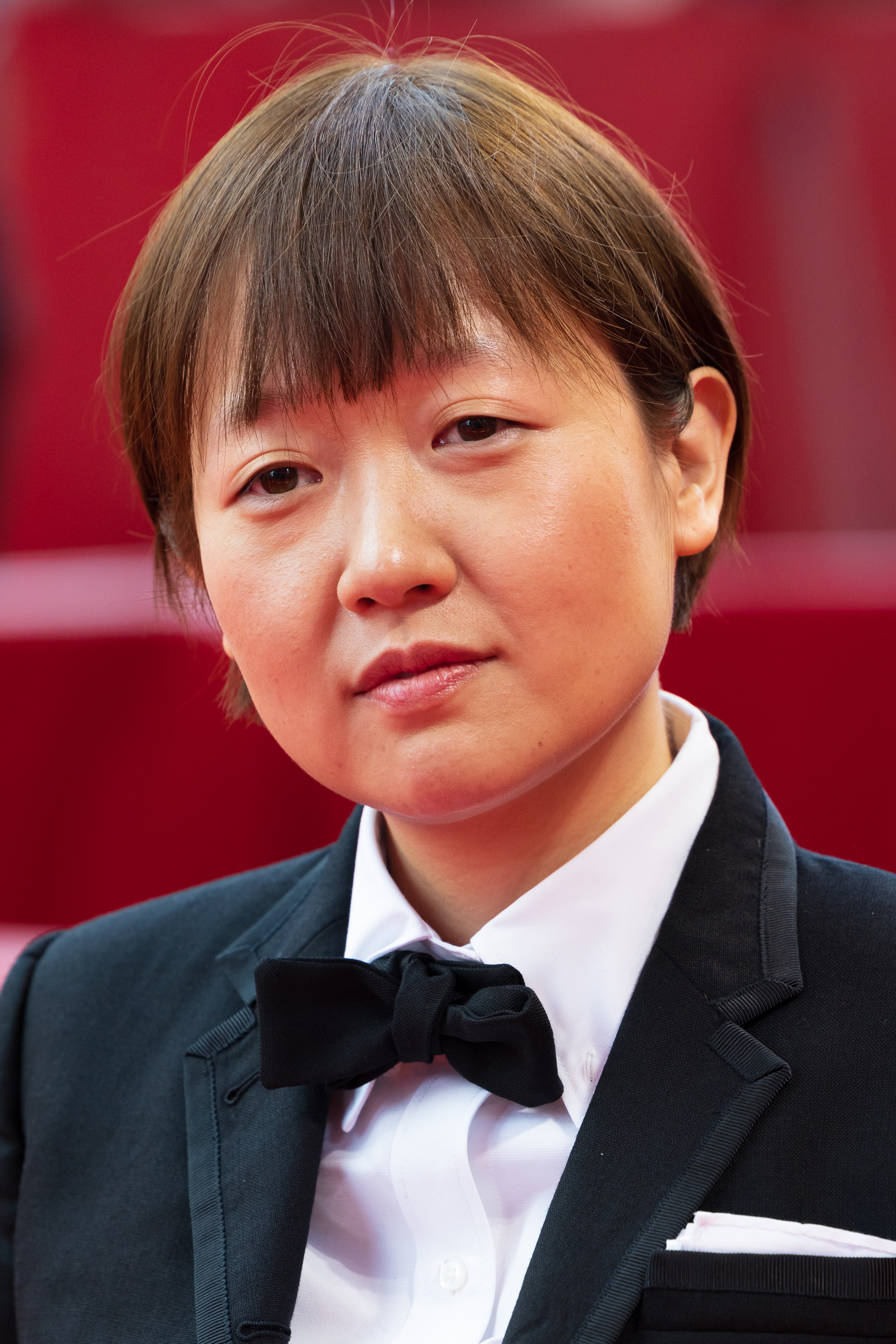
Celine Song, Best Director winner

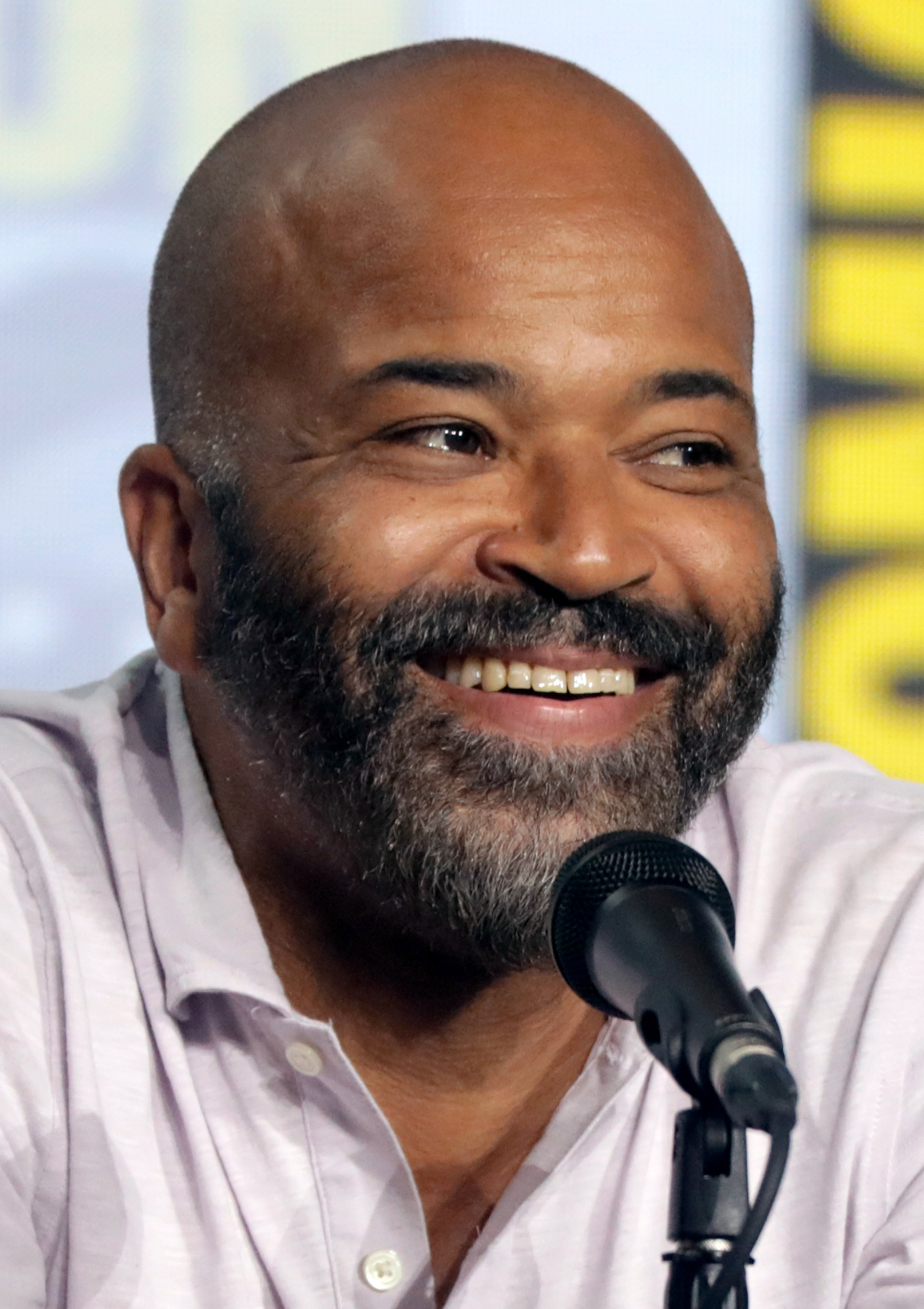
Jeffrey Wright, Best Lead Performance winner

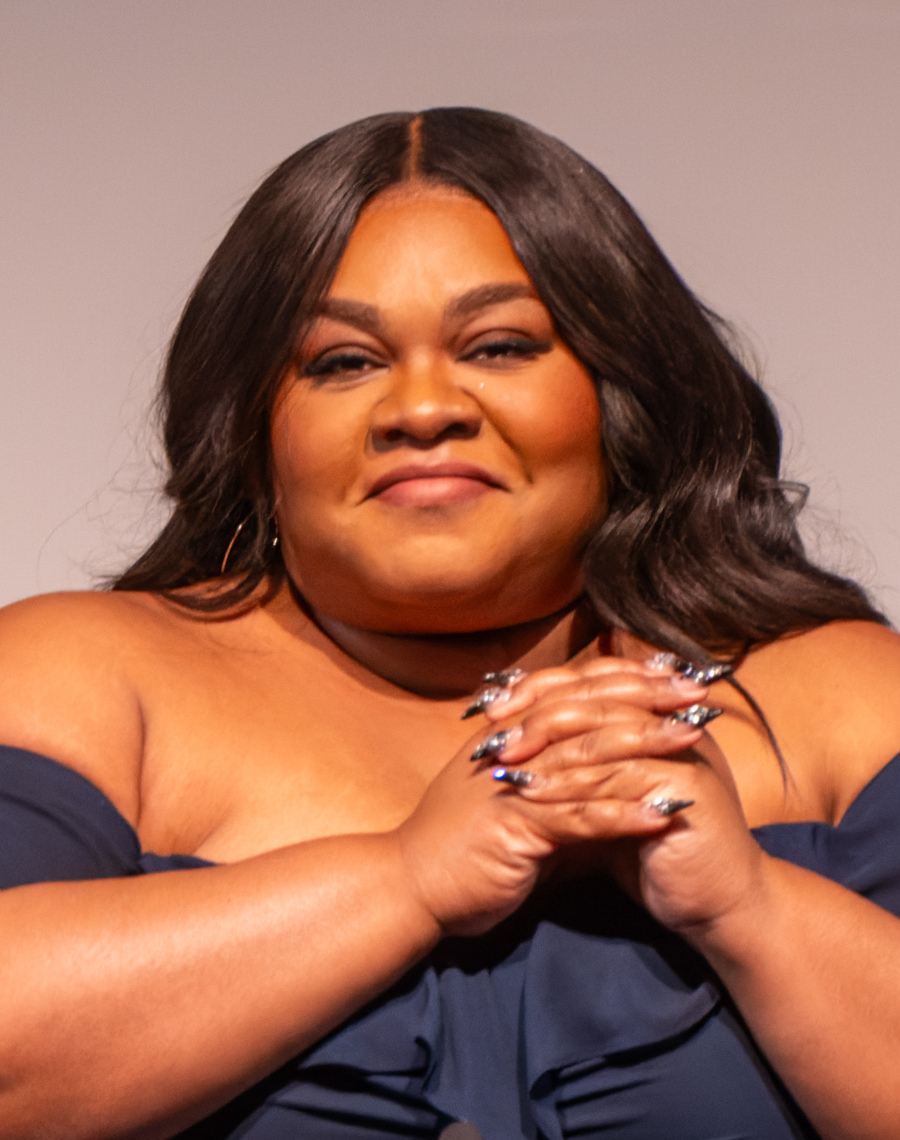
Da'Vine Joy Randolph, Best Supporting Performance winner

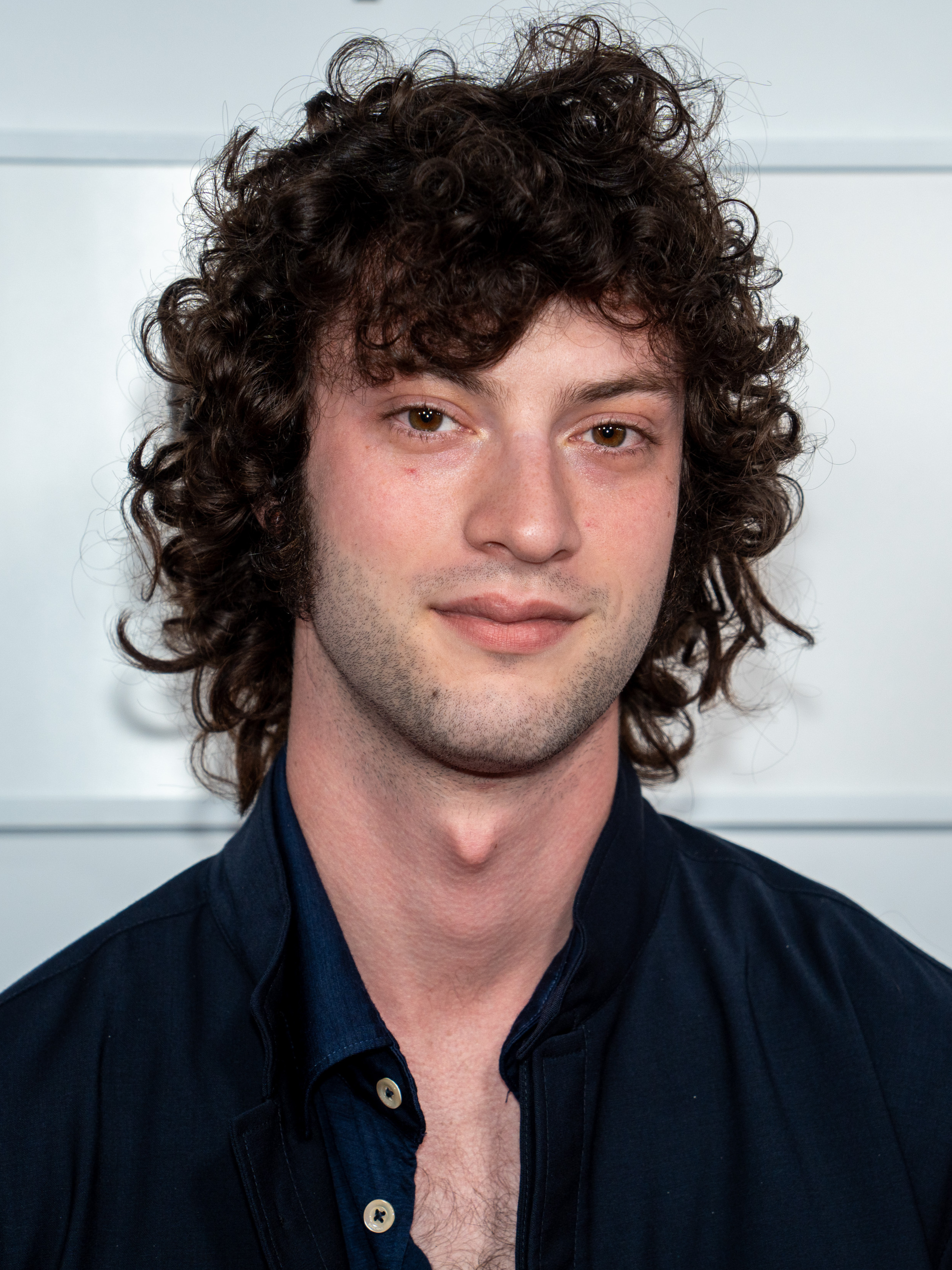
Dominic Sessa, Best Breakthrough Performance winner

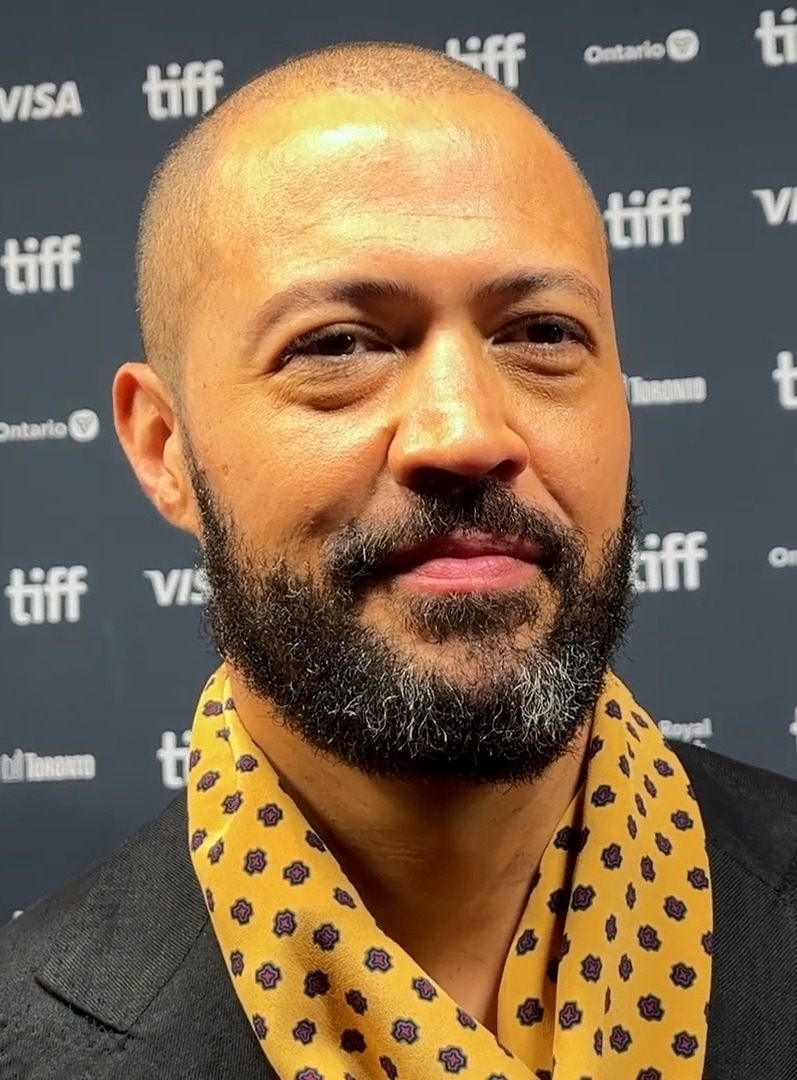
Cord Jefferson, Best Screenplay winner

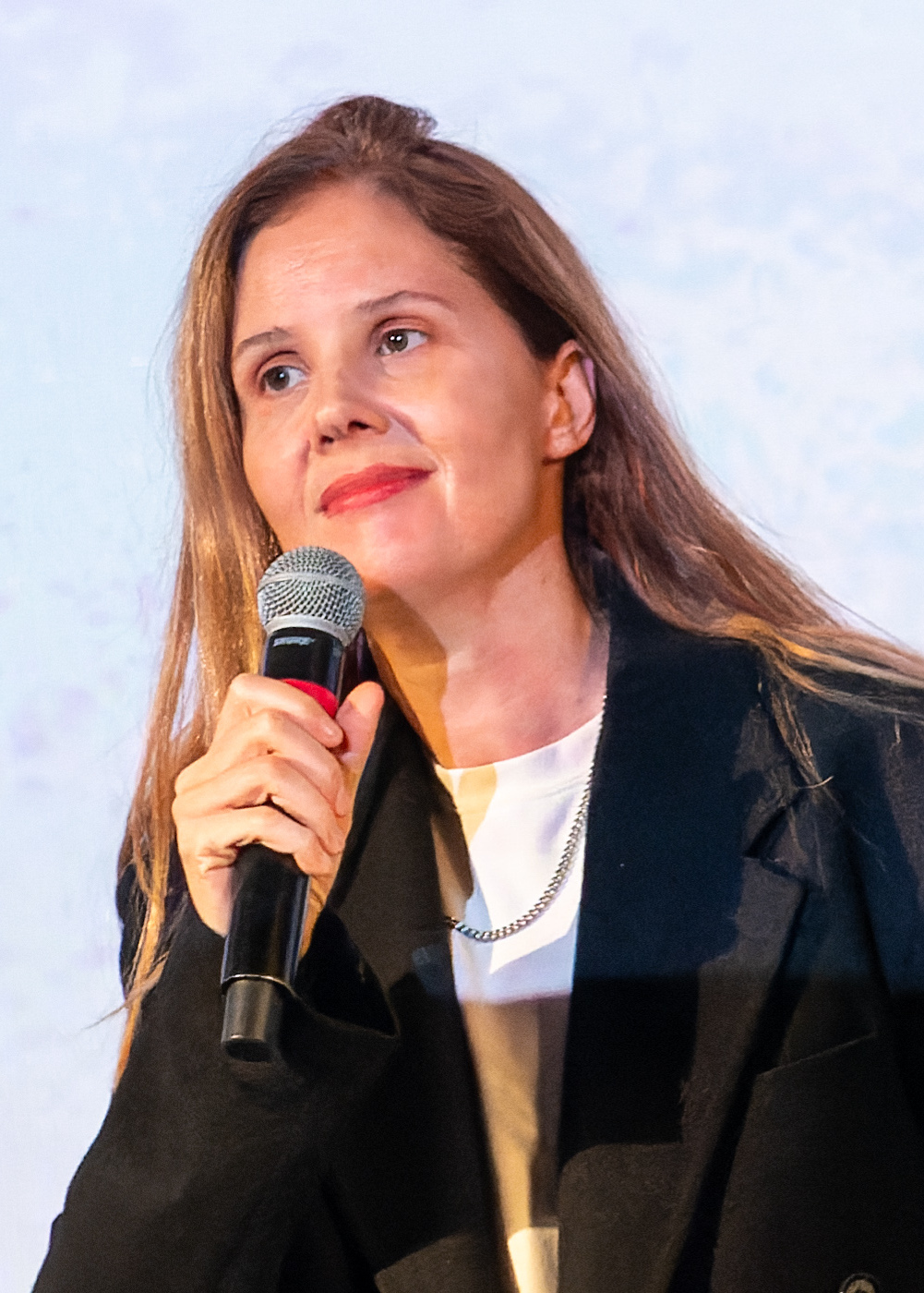
Justine Triet, Best International Film winner

Best Feature	Best Director
Past Lives – David Hinojosa, Pamela Koffler, and Christine Vachon: All of Us Strangers – Graham Broadbent, Pete Czernin, and Sarah Harvey; American Fiction – Cord Jefferson, Jermaine Johnson, Nikos Karamigios, and Ben LeClair; May December – Jessica Elbaum, Will Ferrell, Grant S. Johnson, Pamela Koffler, Tyler W. Konney, Sophie Mas, Natalie Portman, and Christine Vachon; Passages – Michel Merkt and Saïd Ben Saïd; We Grown Now – Minhal Baig and Joe Pirro	Celine Song – Past Lives: Andrew Haigh – All of Us Strangers; Todd Haynes – May December; William Oldroyd – Eileen; Ira Sachs – Passages
Best Lead Performance	Best Supporting Performance
Jeffrey Wright – American Fiction as Thelonious "Monk" Ellison: Jessica Chastain – Memory as Sylvia; Greta Lee – Past Lives as Nora Moon; Trace Lysette – Monica as Monica; Natalie Portman – May December as Elizabeth Berry; Judy Reyes – Birth/Rebirth as Celie; Franz Rogowski – Passages as Tomas; Andrew Scott – All of Us Strangers as Adam; Teyana Taylor – A Thousand and One as Inez de la Paz; Teo Yoo – Past Lives as Hae Sung	Da'Vine Joy Randolph – The Holdovers as Mary Lamb: Erika Alexander – American Fiction as Coraline; Sterling K. Brown – American Fiction as Clifford "Cliff" Ellison; Noah Galvin – Theater Camp as Glenn Winthrop; Anne Hathaway – Eileen as Rebecca; Glenn Howerton – BlackBerry as Jim Balsillie; Marin Ireland – Eileen as Rita Polk; Charles Melton – May December as Joe Yoo; Catalina Saavedra – Rotting in the Sun as Señora "Vero" Verónica; Ben Whishaw – Passages as Martin
Best Breakthrough Performance	Best Screenplay
Dominic Sessa – The Holdovers as Angus Tully: Marshawn Lynch – Bottoms as Mr. G; Atibon Nazaire – Mountains as Xavier; Tia Nomore – Earth Mama as Gia; Anaita Wali Zada – Fremont as Donya	American Fiction – Cord Jefferson: Birth/Rebirth – Laura Moss and Brendan J. O'Brien; Bottoms – Emma Seligman and Rachel Sennott; The Holdovers – David Hemingson; Past Lives – Celine Song
Best First Feature	Best First Screenplay
A Thousand and One – A. V. Rockwell (director); Julia Lebedev, Rishi Rajani, Eddie Vaisman, Lena Waithe, and Brad Weston (producers): All Dirt Roads Taste of Salt – Raven Jackson (director); Maria Altamirano, Mark Ceryak, Barry Jenkins, and Adele Romanski (producers); Chronicles of a Wandering Saint – Tomás Gómez Bustillo (director); Gewan Brown and Amanda Freedman (producers); Earth Mama – Savanah Leaf (director); Sam Bisbee, Shirley O'Connor, Medb Riordan, and Cody Ryder (producers); Upon Entry – Alejandro Rojas and Juan Sebastián Vásquez (directors); Sergio Adrià, Carlos Juárez, Alba Sotorra, Carles Torras, and Xosé Zapata (producers)	May December – Samy Burch; story by Samy Burch and Alex Mechanik: Chronicles of a Wandering Saint – Tomás Gómez Bustillo; The Starling Girl – Laurel Parmet; Theater Camp – Noah Galvin, Molly Gordon, Nick Lieberman, and Ben Platt; Upon Entry – Alejandro Rojas and Juan Sebastián Vásquez
Best Documentary Feature	Best International Film
Four Daughters – Kaouther Ben Hania (director); Nadim Cheikhrouha (producer): Bye Bye Tiberias – Lina Soualem (director); Jean-Marie Nizan (producer); Going to Mars: The Nikki Giovanni Project – Joe Brewster and Michèle Stephenson (directors); Tommy Oliver (producer); Kokomo City – D. Smith (director); Bill Butler and Harris Doran (producers); The Mother of All Lies – Asmae El Moudir (director/producer)	Anatomy of a Fall (France) – Justine Triet: Godland (Denmark / Iceland) – Hlynur Pálmason; Mami Wata (Nigeria) – C. J. "Fiery" Obasi; Tótem (Mexico) – Lila Avilés; The Zone of Interest (United Kingdom / Poland / United States) – Jonathan Glazer
Best Cinematography	Best Editing
The Holdovers – Eigil Bryld: All Dirt Roads Taste of Salt – Jomo Fray; Chronicles of a Wandering Saint – Pablo Lozano; Monica – Katelin Arizmendi; We Grown Now – Pat Scola	How to Blow Up a Pipeline – Daniel Garber: Rotting in the Sun – Santiago Cendejas, Gabriel Díaz, and Sofía Subercaseaux; Theater Camp – Jon Philpot; Upon Entry – Emanuele Tiziani; We Grown Now – Stephanie Filo

==== Films with multiple nominations and awards ====
Films that received multiple nominations
Nominations	Film
5	American Fiction
5	May December
5	Past Lives
4	The Holdovers
4	Passages
3	All of Us Strangers
3	Birth/Rebirth
3	Chronicles of a Wandering Saint
3	Eileen
3	Rotting in the Sun
3	Theater Camp
3	Upon Entry
3	We Grown Now
2	All Dirt Roads Taste of Salt
2	Bottoms
2	Earth Mama
2	Fremont
2	Monica
2	Mountains
2	A Thousand and One

Films that won multiple awards
Awards	Film
3	The Holdovers
2	American Fiction
2	Past Lives

=== Television ===
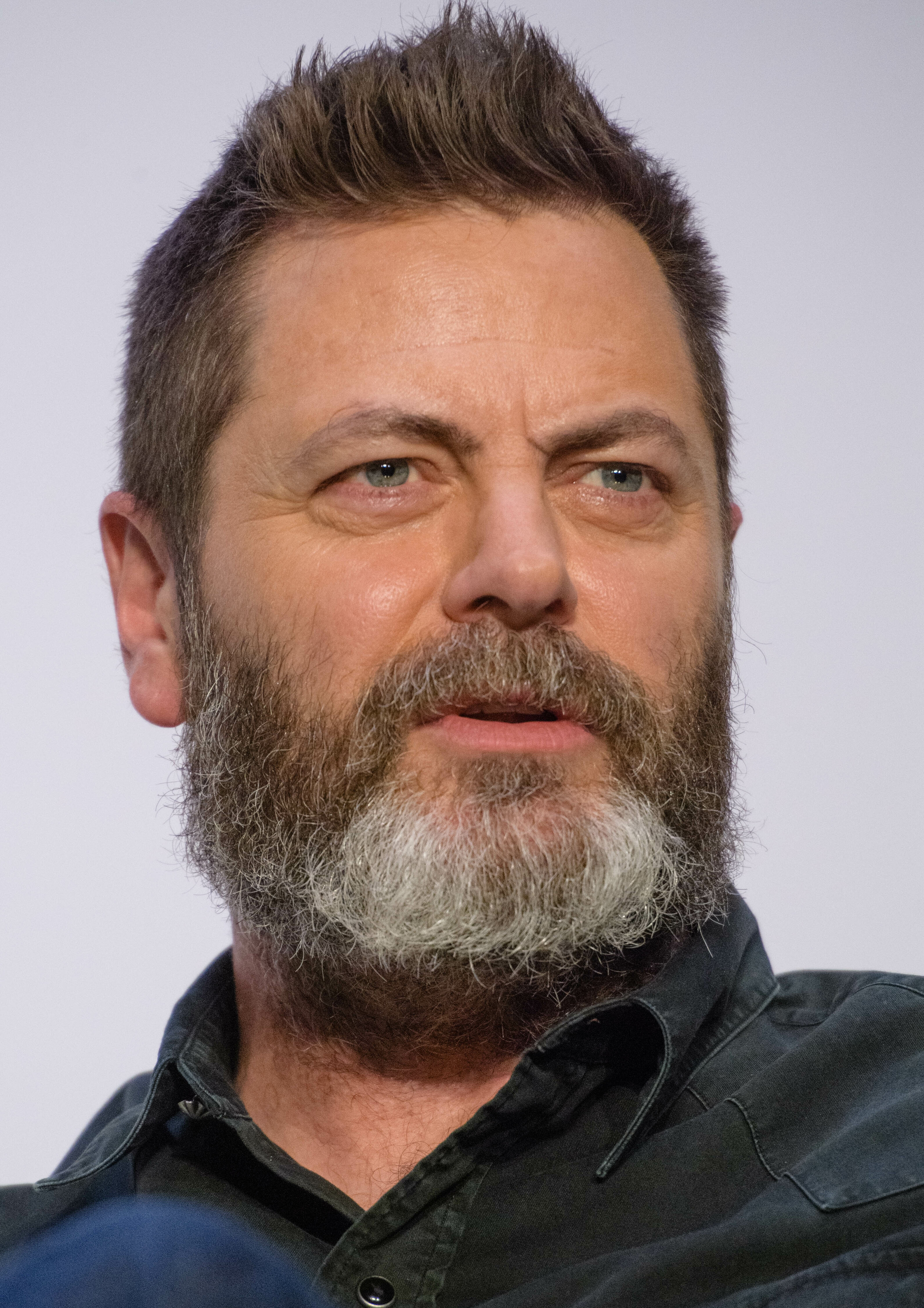
Nick Offerman, Best Supporting Performance in a New Scripted Series winner

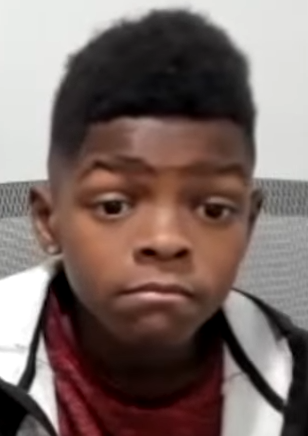
Keivonn Woodard, Best Breakthrough Performance in a New Scripted Series winner

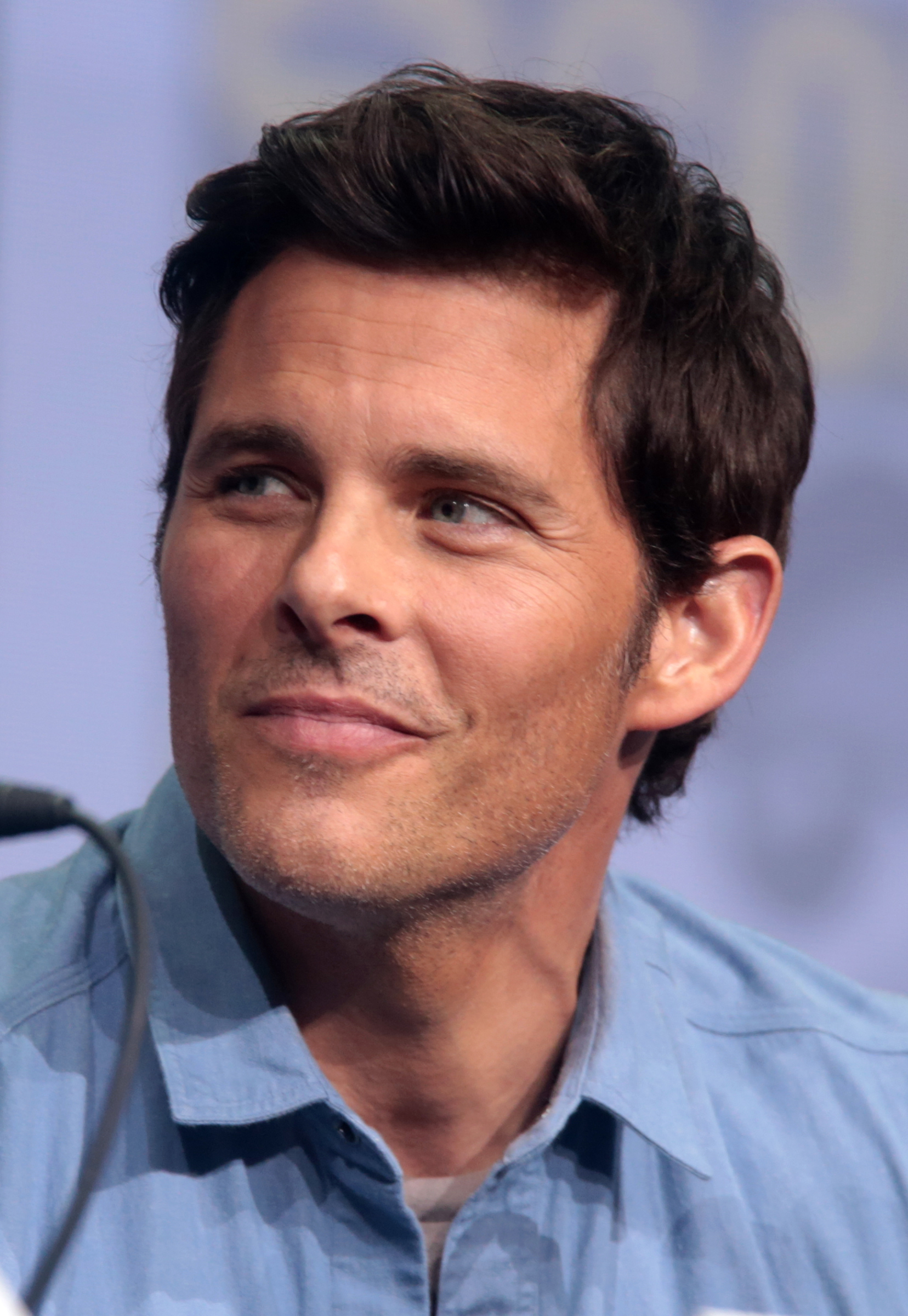
James Marsden, Best Ensemble Cast in a New Scripted Series co-winner

Best New Scripted Series	Best New Non-Scripted or Documentary Series
Beef – Lee Sung Jin (creator/executive producer); Steven Yeun, Ali Wong, Jake Schreier, Ravi Nandan, and Alli Reich (executive producers); Alice Ju and Carrie Kemper (co-executive producers) (Netflix): Dreaming Whilst Black – Adjani Salmon (creator/executive producer); Maximilian Evans, Natasha Jatania, and Laura Seixas (executive producers); Tanya Qureshi, Dhanny Joshi, Bal Samra, and Thomas Stogdon (co-executive producers) (Showtime); I'm a Virgo – Boots Riley (creator/executive producer); Tze Chun, Michael Ellenberg, Lindsey Springer, Jharrel Jerome, and Rebecca Rivo (executive producers); Marcus Gardley and Carver Karaszewski (co-executive producers) (Prime Video); Jury Duty – Lee Eisenberg and Gene Stupnitsky (creators/executive producers); David Bernad, Ruben Fleischer, Nicholas Hatton, Cody Heller, Todd Schulman, Jake Szymanski, and Andrew Weinberg (executive producers) (Freevee); Slip – Zoe Lister-Jones (creator/executive producer); Ro Donnelly, Dakota Johnson, Katie O'Connell Marsh, David Fortier, and Ivan Schneeberg (executive producers) (The Roku Channel)	Dear Mama – Lasse Järvi, Quincy "QD3" Jones III, Staci Robinson, Nelson George, Charles D. King, Peter Nelson, Adel "Future" Nur, Jamal Joseph, Ted Skillman, Allen Hughes, Steve Berman, Marc Cimino, Jody Gerson, John Janick, Nicholas Ferrall, and Nigel Sinclair (executive producers) (FX): Deadlocked: How America Shaped the Supreme Court – Vinnie Malhotra, Aaron Saidman, Eli Holzman, and Dawn Porter (executive producers) (Showtime); Murder in Big Horn – Matthew Galkin and Vinnie Malhotra (executive producers); Lisa Kalikow and Joshua Levine (co-executive producers) (Showtime); Stolen Youth: Inside the Cult at Sarah Lawrence – Mindy Goldberg, Dan Cogan, Liz Garbus, Jon Bardin, Zach Heinzerling, Krista Parris, Daniel Barban Levin, and Felicia Rosario (executive producers); Julie Gaither (co-executive producer) (Hulu); Wrestlers – Greg Whiteley and Ryan O'Dowd (executive producers); Alejandro Melendez and Adam Leibowitz (co-executive producers) (Netflix)
Best Lead Performance in a New Scripted Series	Best Supporting Performance in a New Scripted Series
Ali Wong – Beef as Amy Lau (Netflix): Emma Corrin – A Murder at the End of the World as Darby Hart (FX on Hulu); Dominique Fishback – Swarm as Andrea "Dre" Greene (Prime Video); Betty Gilpin – Mrs. Davis as Sister Simone (Peacock); Jharrel Jerome – I'm a Virgo as Cootie (Prime Video); Zoe Lister-Jones – Slip as Mae Cannon (The Roku Channel); Bel Powley – A Small Light as Miep Gies (Nat Geo); Bella Ramsey – The Last of Us as Ellie (HBO); Ramón Rodríguez – Will Trent as Will Trent (ABC); Steven Yeun – Beef as Danny Cho (Netflix)	Nick Offerman – The Last of Us as Bill (HBO): Murray Bartlett – The Last of Us as Frank (HBO); Billie Eilish – Swarm as Eva (Prime Video); Jack Farthing – Rain Dogs as Selby (HBO); Adina Porter – The Changeling as Lillian Kagwa (Apple TV+); Lewis Pullman – Lessons in Chemistry as Calvin Evans (Apple TV+); Benny Safdie – The Curse as Dougie Schecter (Showtime); Luke Tennie – Shrinking as Sean (Apple TV+); Olivia Washington – I'm a Virgo as Flora (Prime Video); Jessica Williams – Shrinking as Gaby (Apple TV+)
Best Breakthrough Performance in a New Scripted Series	Best Ensemble Cast in a New Scripted Series
Keivonn Woodard – The Last of Us as Sam (HBO): Clark Backo – The Changeling as Emma "Emmy" Valentine (Apple TV+); Aria Mia Loberti – All the Light We Cannot See as Marie-Laure LeBlanc (Netflix); Adjani Salmon – Dreaming Whilst Black as Kwabena (Showtime); Kara Young – I'm a Virgo as Jones (Prime Video)	Jury Duty – Alan Barinholtz, Susan Berger, Cassandra Blair, David Brown, Kirk Fox, Ross Kimball, Pramode Kumar, Trisha LaFache, Mekki Leeper, James Marsden, Edy Modica, Kerry O'Neill, Rashida Olayiwola, Whitney Rice, Maria Russell, Ishmel Sahid, Ben Seaward, Ron Song, and Evan Williams

==== Series with multiple nominations and awards ====
Series that received multiple nominations
Nominations	Series
4	I'm a Virgo
4	The Last of Us
3	Beef
2	The Changeling
2	Dreaming Whilst Black
2	Jury Duty
2	Shrinking
2	Slip
2	Swarm

Series that won multiple awards
Wins	Series
2	Beef
2	The Last of Us

== Special awards ==
=== John Cassavetes Award ===
(The award is given to the best feature made for under $1,000,000; award given to the writer, director, and producer)

Fremont – Babak Jalali (director/writer); Carolina Cavalli (writer); Rachael Fung, Chris Martin, Marjaneh Moghimi, George Rush, Sudnya Shroff, and Laura Wagner (producers)

- The Artifice Girl – Franklin Ritch (director/writer); Aaron B. Koontz and Ashleigh Snead (producers)
- Cadejo Blanco – Justin Lerner (director/writer/producer); Mauricio Escobar, Ryan Friedkin, and Jack Patrick Hurley (producers)
- Rotting in the Sun – Sebastián Silva (director/writer); Pedro Peirano (writer); Jacob Wasserman (producer)
- The Unknown Country – Morrisa Maltz (director/writer/producer); Lily Gladstone (writer); Lainey Bearkiller Shangreaux and Vanara Taing (writers/producers); Katherine Harper, Laura Heberton, and Tommy Heitkamp (producers)

=== Robert Altman Award ===
(The award is given to the film's director, casting director, and ensemble cast)

- Showing Up – Kelly Reichardt (director); Gayle Keller (casting director); André Benjamin, Hong Chau, Judd Hirsch, Heather Lawless, James LeGros, John Magaro, Matt Malloy, Amanda Plummer, Maryann Plunkett, Denzel Rodriguez, and Michelle Williams (cast)

== Emerging Filmmakers Awards ==
=== Producers Award ===
The award honors emerging producers who, despite highly limited resources, demonstrate the creativity, tenacity and vision required to produce quality, independent films.

- Monique Walton
  - Rachael Fung
  - Graham Swon

=== Someone to Watch Award ===
The award recognizes a talented filmmaker of singular vision who has not yet received appropriate recognition.

- Monica Sorelle – Mountains
  - Joanna Arnow – The Feeling That the Time for Doing Something Has Passed
  - Laura Moss – Birth/Rebirth

=== Truer than Fiction Award ===
The award is presented to an emerging director of non-fiction features who has not yet received significant recognition.

- Set Hernandez – Unseen
  - Jesse Short Bull and Laura Tomaselli – Lakota Nation vs. United States
  - Sierra Urich – Joonam

== Palestinian genocide protest ==
Outside the venue, a handful of protesters were located on the beach in Santa Monica playing previously recorded chants on a megaphone, such as "free Palestine", "long live Palestine" and "ceasefire now", which played on a loop throughout most of the ceremony and was audible to everyone inside; host Aidy Bryant, and winners Babak Jalali and Kelly Reichardt referenced the chants in their acceptance speeches. It was also revealed that the disruption was coming from one young male who was holding the loudspeaker and standing on the outer part of the Spirits barricade; a group of security guards and Spirits showrunners tried to reason with the protester, who was quite calm and tranquil, but to no success. Another group of Spirits security guards stood by and watched; three police officers, one in fully armed gear, looked on.

Additionally, The New York Times reporter Kyle Buchanan spoke to the protester who refused to give a statement and revealed that he is with the National Alliance Against Racist & Political Repression; the protester elaborated that The New York Times "is a publication that has been complicit in misinformation and distortion of the facts".

Furthermore, film critic Tomris Laffly was able to speak to one of the protesters, Vivian Wiseman, about disrupting awards events to keep a light on the Israeli–Palestinian conflict; Wiseman told Laffly: "We want everyone to know that the activists and the people who care are going to disrupt them wherever they go because we believe in love, we believe in peace, and we believe in liberation of the Palestinian people."

Afterward, Josh Welsh, the long-serving president of Film Independent, responded to the scene, stating: "We embrace the First Amendment and freedom of speech, and this is clearly a moment when people feel passionately about what's happening in the world and want to speak about it. We support that. Of course, we also want to honor the filmmakers here today in their moment being recognized for their beautiful work. But I think today was a beautiful show and people incorporated what was going on into their remarks in really great ways."

The following day, the Los Angeles Times revealed that filmmaker Merawi Gerima was among the protesters; Gerima previously won the John Cassavetes Award for his film Residue at the 36th Independent Spirit Awards in 2021. A video posted to the Instagram page of the U.S. Palestinian Community Network (USPCN) showed the beginning of the protest, with Gerima speaking into a loudspeaker to announce they are there on behalf of the USPCN and the National Alliance Against Racist & Political Repression. "We say it is far better to stand with the oppressed people around the world than with the oppressors here in Hollywood," Gerima said in the video, before specifically calling out multiple times actor Jeffrey Wright, star of the film American Fiction; the film won two awards, including Best Lead Performance for Wright. "It's not enough to have a film about racism, Mr. Jeffrey Wright," said Gerima. "It's not enough to have a film about oppression in the United States, Jeffrey Wright. It is far more important to stand against oppression and racism as it exists in the world today in solidarity with the Black and brown people of the planet, particularly Palestinians." Gerima stated in another video: "A whole industry of communicators is absolutely silent in the face of genocide. And so we say no business as usual, not even in Hollywood." A request for comment from Gerima was not responded to while Film Independent did not respond to a request for comment on the protest.

== See also ==
- 96th Academy Awards
- 81st Golden Globe Awards
- 77th British Academy Film Awards
- 44th Golden Raspberry Awards
- 30th Screen Actors Guild Awards
- 29th Critics' Choice Awards
