= Chronicles of a Wandering Saint =

- Directed by: Tomás Gómez Bustillo
- Written by: Tomás Gómez Bustillo
- Produced by: Gewan Brown; Amanda Freedman; Tomas Medero
- Starring: Mónica Villa; Horacio Marassi
- Cinematography: Pablo Lozano
- Music by: Felipe Delsart
- Production company: Plenty Good
- Distributed by: Hope Runs High
- Release date: 12 March 2023 (SXSW)
- Running time: 84 minutes
- Countries: Argentina; USA
- Language: Spanish

Chronicles of a Wandering Saint is a 2023 Argentine-US supernatural comedy film written and directed by Tomás Gómez Bustillo in his directorial debut. Nominated for three 2024 Independent Spirit Awards, it stars Mónica Villa.

== Synopsis ==
In a tiny Argentinian town, a pious yet competitive woman decides that staging a miracle could be her ticket to sainthood. After discovering a lost statue, she orchestrates a grand reveal that will finally anoint her as the most admired woman in town. But before the unveiling, she dies in a car accident, and in the second half of the film acts as a soul which is not seen or heard by living humans. During this period, she is forced to reevaluate everything she once took for granted.

== Release ==
Chronicles of a Wandering Saint premiered at the 2023 SXSW where it won the Adam Yauch Hornblower award. Hope Runs High acquired the film in early 2024 for theatrical release.

== Reception ==
The film was nominated for Best First Feature, Best First Screenplay, and Best Cinematography at the 2024 Film Independent Spirit Awards. J Hurtado of Screen Anarchy praised the film's script, performances and "high concept".

=== Critical response ===
On the review aggregator website Rotten Tomatoes, 100% of 32 critics' reviews are positive, with an average rating of 8.2/10. The website's consensus reads: "A humorously absurd film based on relatable human aspirations, Chronicles of a Wandering Saint is as fantastically life-affirming as it gets." Metacritic, which uses a weighted average, assigned the film a score of 76 out of 100, based on 6 critics, indicating "generally favorable" reviews.
