= Theater Camp =

2023 film by Molly Gordon and Nick Lieberman

- Theatrical release poster
- Directed by: Molly Gordon; Nick Lieberman
- Written by: Noah Galvin; Molly Gordon; Nick Lieberman; Ben Platt
- Based on: Theater Camp by Noah Galvin; Molly Gordon; Nick Lieberman; Ben Platt
- Produced by: Erik Feig; Samie Kim Falvey; Julia Hammer; Ryan Heller; Maria Zuckerman; Jessica Elbaum; Will Ferrell; Noah Galvin; Molly Gordon; Nick Lieberman; Ben Platt
- Starring: Noah Galvin; Molly Gordon; Ben Platt; Jimmy Tatro; Patti Harrison; Nathan Lee Graham; Ayo Edebiri; Owen Thiele; Caroline Aaron; Amy Sedaris
- Cinematography: Nate Hurtsellers
- Edited by: Jon Philpot
- Music by: James McAlister; Mark Sonnenblick
- Production companies: Picturestart; Topic Studios; Gloria Sanchez Productions
- Distributed by: Searchlight Pictures
- Release dates: January 21, 2023 (Sundance); July 14, 2023 (United States)
- Running time: 93 minutes
- Country: United States
- Language: English
- Box office: $4.6 million

Theater Camp is a 2023 American mockumentary comedy film directed by Molly Gordon and Nick Lieberman in both of their feature directorial debuts from a screenplay by Gordon, Lieberman, Ben Platt, and Noah Galvin. A feature-length adaptation of the 2020 short film of the same name, the film follows the counselors of an underfunded theater-focused summer camp as they band together with the founder's son to keep the camp afloat. It features an ensemble cast that includes Galvin, Gordon, Platt, Jimmy Tatro, Patti Harrison, Nathan Lee Graham, Ayo Edebiri, Owen Thiele, Caroline Aaron and Amy Sedaris. Will Ferrell serves as a producer under his Gloria Sanchez Productions banner.

Theater Camp had its world premiere at the Sundance Film Festival on January 21, 2023, where the cast was awarded the U.S. Dramatic Special Jury Award for Ensemble Cast. The film was released in the United States on July 14, 2023, by Searchlight Pictures. It received positive reviews from critics and was named one of the top 10 independent films of 2023 by the National Board of Review. Galvin received a nomination for the Independent Spirit Award for Best Supporting Performance at the 39th Independent Spirit Awards.

== Plot ==
Joan Rubinsky is the co-founder and director of AdirondACTS, a theater-focused summer camp in the Adirondacks in Upstate New York. While attending a show featuring one of her campers, a strobe light causes Joan to experience a seizure and slip into a coma. In her absence, Joan's son Troy, a professional "business influencer", inherits ownership of AdirondACTS but finds that his personality clashes with those of the theater kids. He makes various attempts to alleviate the camp's financial difficulties, including turning his cabin into an Airbnb, which he shares with guest Tim. He is assisted by Joan's staff, including Amos and Rebecca-Diane, two best friends who are also former campers and longtime staff members.

Amos and Rebecca-Diane announce the summer's slate of productions, including Joan, Still, a new original musical based on Joan's life story, which they have yet to write. During auditions, Troy is approached by Caroline, a representative of investment firm Barnswell Capital, which operates the luxurious neighboring Camp Lakeside. Barnswell offers to purchase the property after revealing to the unaware Troy that the camp is facing foreclosure.

Amos and Rebecca-Diane make progress on Joan, Still, with Rebecca-Diane promising to compose the lyrics and music for the show's finale. Meanwhile, Troy and the camp's chief technician, Glenn, attempt to raise money by having the kids act as servers during a Rotary Club event, with mixed results. As the production continues, Amos is troubled by Rebecca-Diane's continued absences, including disappearing from classes, missing her "performance night" for the campers, and failing to show up to rehearsals. Caroline winds up sleeping with Troy, who accidentally signs a contract to sell the camp.

With days remaining before the show, Amos presses Rebecca-Diane to unveil the closing number, which she has not completed. She instead performs an improvised number, sparking an argument between her and Amos. She reveals that she has been absent because she has been hired as a cruise ship performer; the revelation infuriates Amos, who resents feeling left behind in their partnership and refuses to listen to Rebecca-Diane's concerns that her career prospects are fading away. In the midst of their fight, Caroline arrives at the rehearsal, forcing Troy to reveal that the camp could be shut down.

Realizing that the sale will only take place if the bank forecloses on AdirondACTS, Troy invites the "Founding Ballers", a group of popular financial influencers, to the performance of Joan, Still, hoping to get much-needed investments. The play is thrown into jeopardy when Darla, the lead, suddenly departs for a prime movie role, but she is replaced by Glenn, who seizes the opportunity to finally show off his talent. At the end of the show, the cast performs a completed version of Rebecca-Diane's closing number and shares what they have learned from attending camp. Amos and Rebecca-Diane reconcile, with Amos deciding to remain at AdirondACTS and giving Rebecca-Diane his blessing to leave, though she tells him that she'll come and visit him as much as possible.

Although the Founding Ballers enjoy the show, they are revealed to be financially insolvent; instead, AdirondACTS is rescued from foreclosure by a significant donation from Tim, who related to the show's themes. Rebecca-Diane finds success with her cruise ship gig until she accidentally burns down the vessel trying to conduct a séance, while Glenn departs the camp to play Elphaba in Wicked at a Saratoga Springs theater. Amos dedicates himself to teaching, and Troy takes on his mother's work raising money for the camp. When the show finishes, a random hospital patient who was watching the show from a live stream praises the show, as Troy was planning to show it to his mother on the live stream but accidentally set it up in the wrong room.

Joan awakens from her coma after the show finishes, with her first words being: "Don't let Troy run the camp!". The other patient who was watching the show tells Joan how wonderful the show was.

== Cast ==
- Ben Platt as Amos Klobuchar
- Molly Gordon as Rebecca-Diane
- Noah Galvin as Glenn Winthrop
- Jimmy Tatro as Troy Rubinsky
- Caroline Aaron as Rita Cohen
- Ayo Edebiri as Janet Walch
- Nathan Lee Graham as Clive DeWitt
- Owen Thiele as Gigi Charbonier
- Amy Sedaris as Joan Rubinsky
- Patti Harrison as Caroline Krauss
- Bailee Bonick as Mackenzie Thomas
- Kyndra Sanchez as Darla Sanchez
- Donovan Colan as Devon Miller
- Vivienne Sachs as Lainy Fischer
- Alan Kim as Alan Park
- Alexander Bello as Sebastian Campbell
- Luke Islam as Christopher L
- Jack Sobolewski as Christopher S
- Quinn Titcomb as Alice Taylor
- Madisen Lora as Franny King
- Susie Essman as Woman in Hospital Bed (uncredited)

== Production ==
=== Development and casting ===
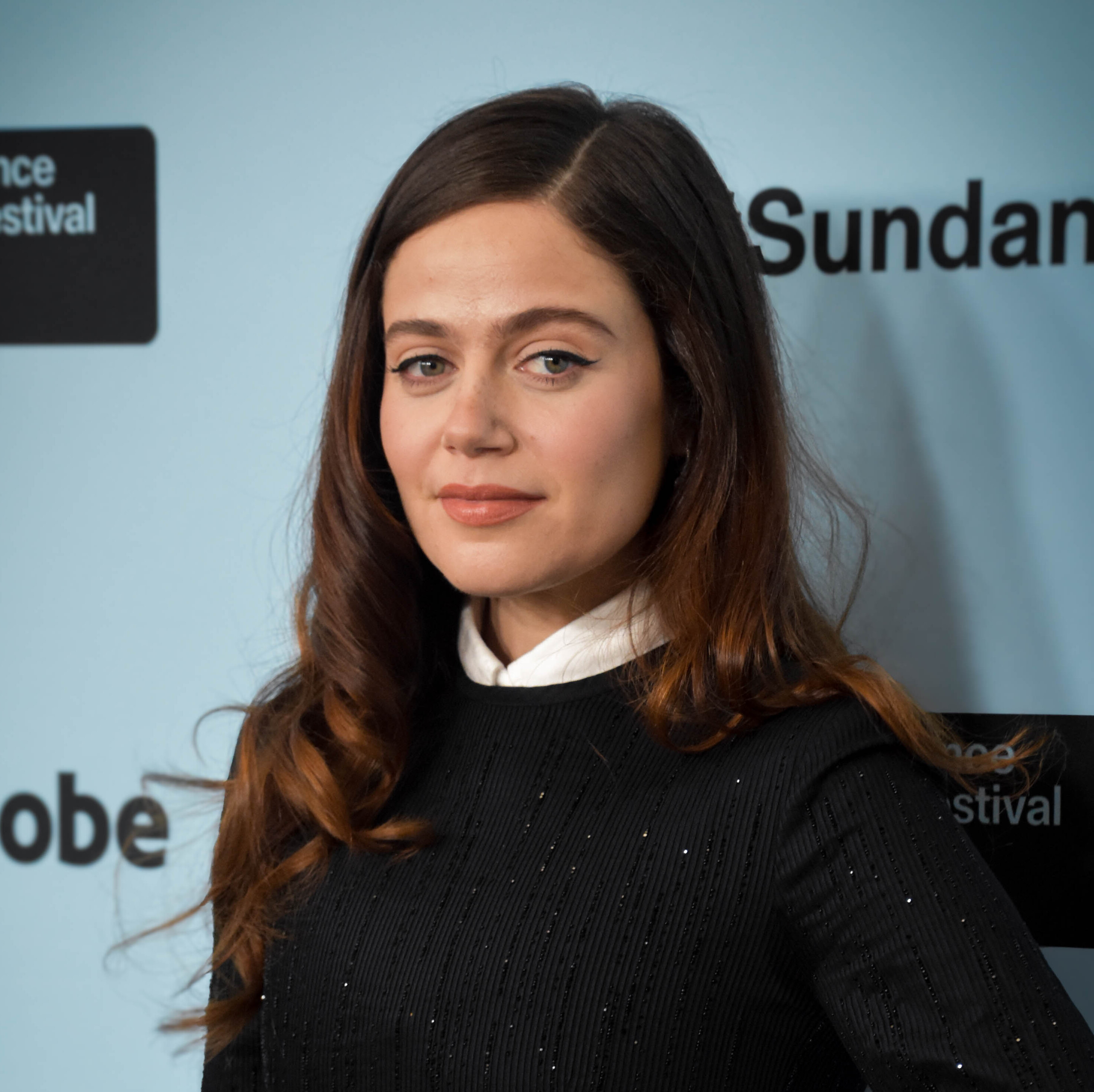
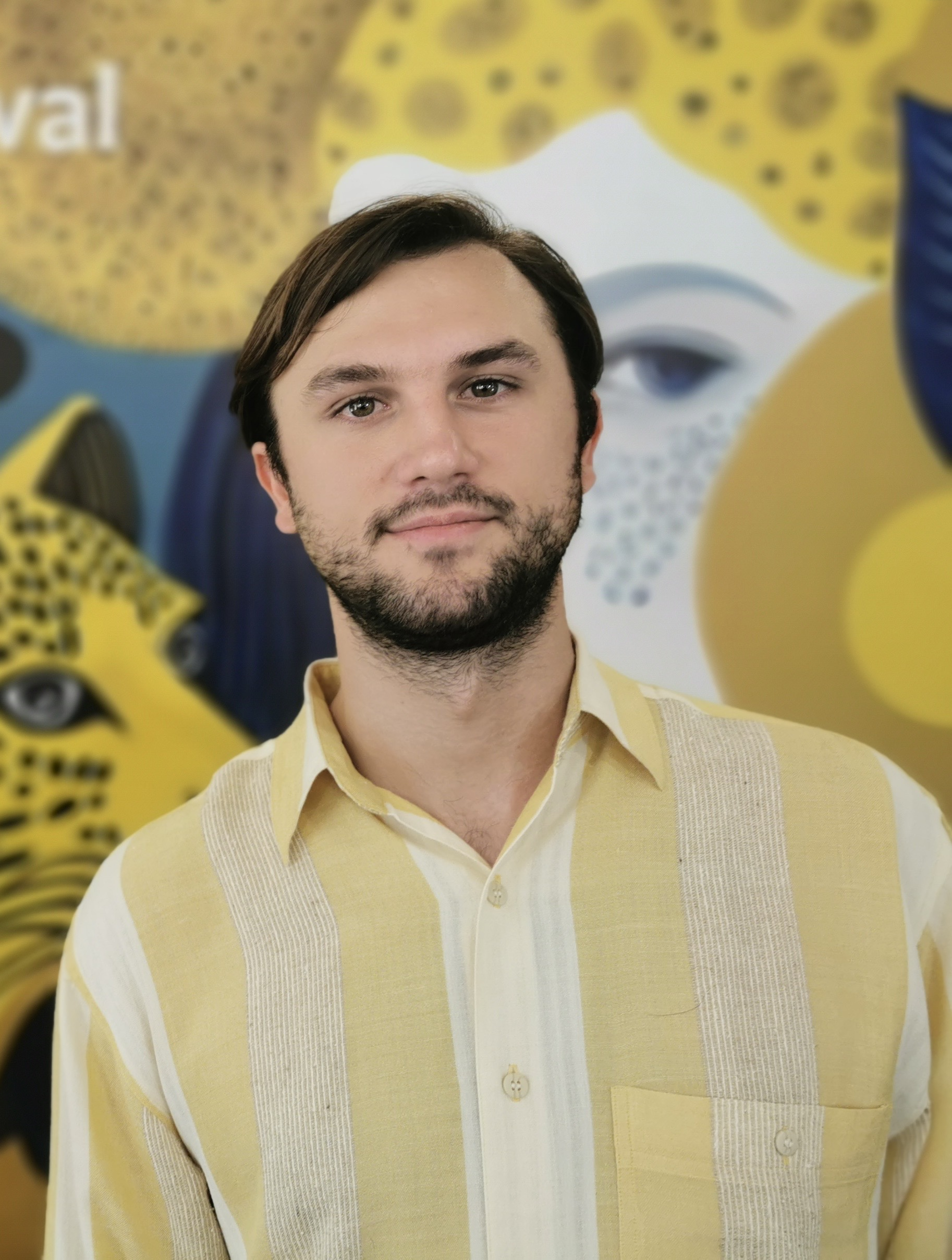
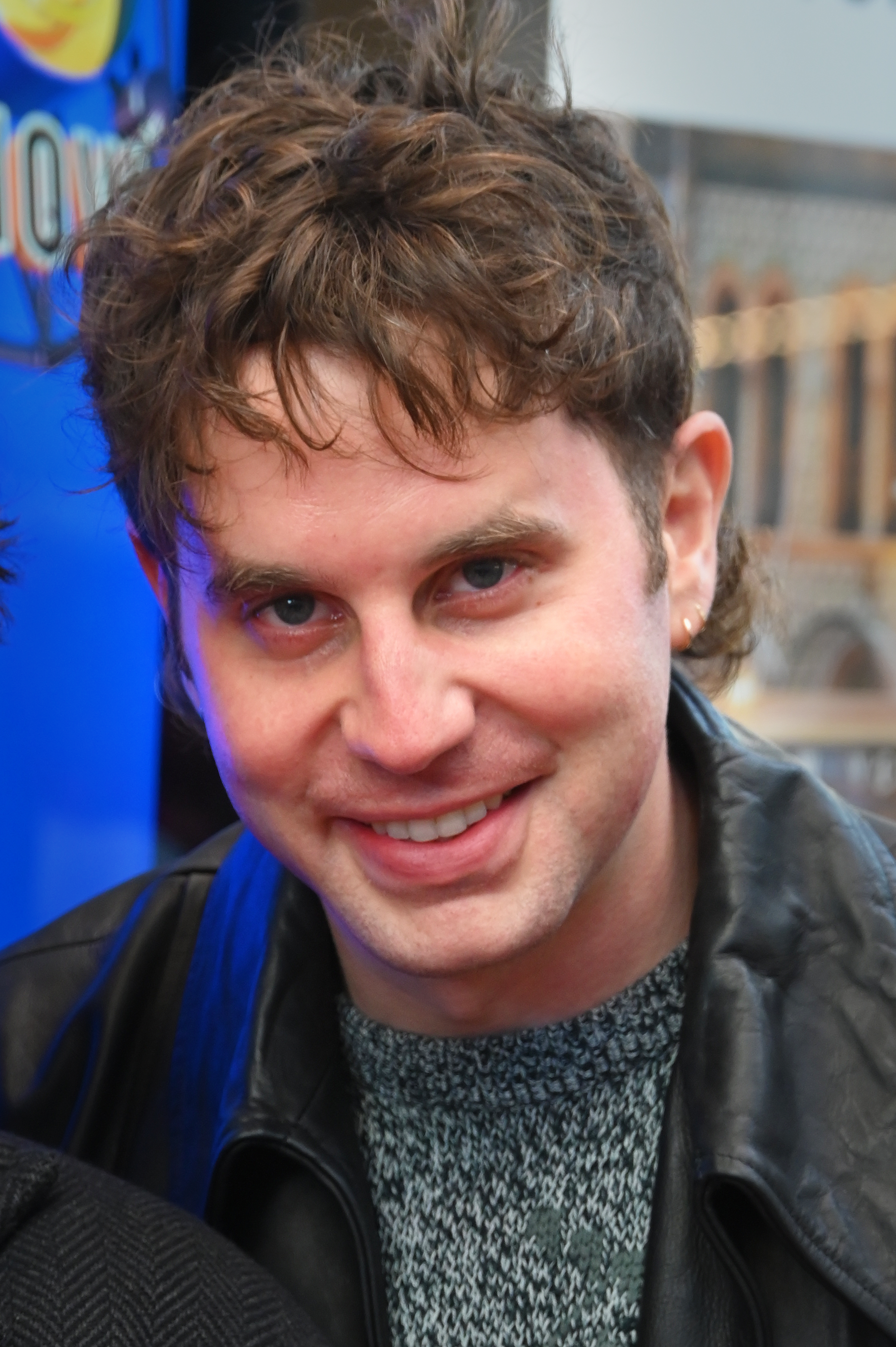
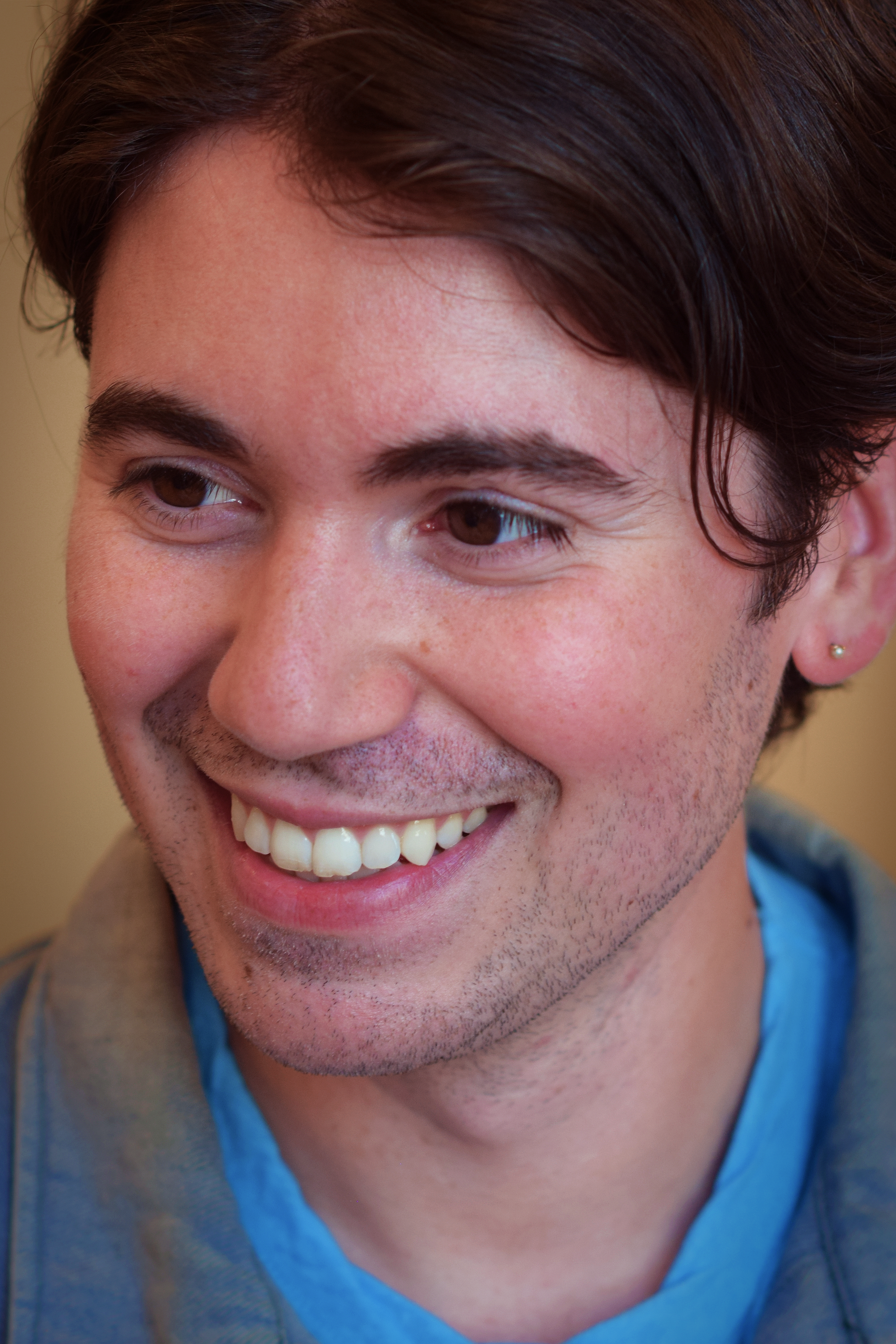
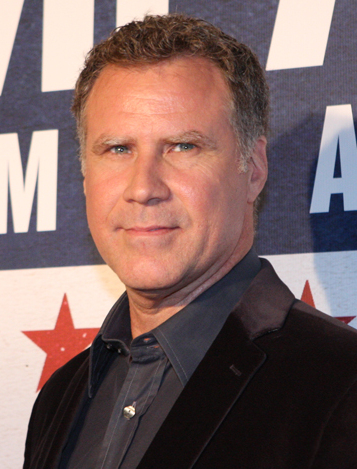
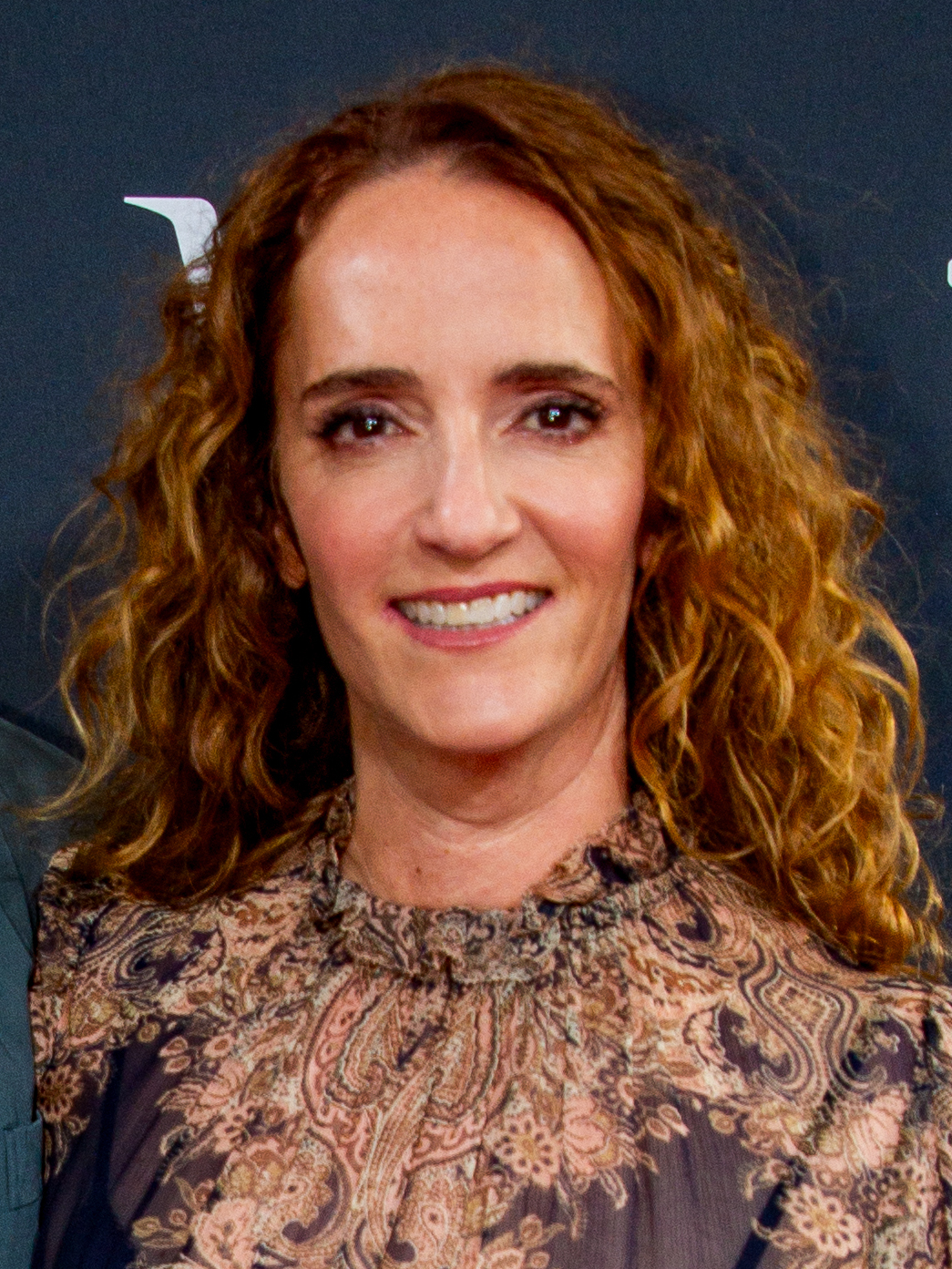
Molly Gordon and Nick Lieberman (top row) co-directed the film and also co-wrote the screenplay with actors Ben Platt (top right) and Noah Galvin (bottom left) and co-produced it with Will Ferrell and Jessica Elbaum.

In June 2022, it was reported that Molly Gordon and Nick Lieberman would direct the film from a screenplay they wrote alongside Ben Platt and Noah Galvin. Gordon, Platt, Galvin, Jimmy Tatro, Patti Harrison, Ayo Edebiri, Amy Sedaris, Caroline Aaron, Nathan Lee Graham, Owen Thiele, Alan Kim, Luke Islam, Jack Sobolewski, Kyndra Sanchez, Quinn Titcomb, Madisen Lora, Bailee Bonick, Donovan Colan, Vivienne Sachs, and Alexander Bello were set to star, and Will Ferrell would serve as a producer under his Gloria Sanchez Productions banner. The film's soundtrack was released by Interscope Records.

Platt said that due to the film's budget, only a few real Broadway songs could be used; as a result, the filmmakers wrote snippets of "musical theatre songs that don't exist" for the scene in which the campers audition.

=== Filming ===
Principal photography began on June 6, 2022, at the former URJ Kutz Camp in Warwick, New York, and wrapped on June 30, 2022. According to Tatro, most of the dialogue was improvised.

== Release ==
Theater Camp had its world premiere at the Sundance Film Festival on January 21, 2023, where it received two standing ovations from the audience, one following the film itself and after a special post-screening musical performance from the younger actors of a medley of songs from the film's finale. Shortly after, Searchlight Pictures acquired distribution rights to the film for $8 million. The film was released in select theaters on July 14, 2023.

The film was released on American subscription streaming service Hulu and through VOD on September 14, 2023.

== Reception ==
=== Box office ===
The film opened with $301,220 (or $50,203 per theater at six locations) and was the strongest limited opening for Searchlight Pictures since 2019's Jojo Rabbit ($349,000 at five locations).

=== Critical response ===
On the review aggregator website Rotten Tomatoes, 86% of 181 critics' reviews are positive, with an average rating of 7.3/10. The website's consensus reads: "Theater Camp's authentic depiction of the theater experience may not resonate as strongly with non-actors, but they'll probably be laughing too hard to seriously complain." Metacritic, which uses a weighted average, assigned the film a score of 70 out of 100, based on 41 critics, indicating "generally favorable" reviews. Audiences polled by CinemaScore gave the film an average grade of "A" on an A+ to F scale.

Filmmakers Chad Hartigan, A. V. Rockwell and Daniel Scheinert cited the film as among their favorites of 2023.

=== Accolades ===
The film's ensemble was presented with the U.S. Dramatic Special Jury Award at the 2023 Sundance Film Festival. The film was named one of the top 10 independent films of 2023 by the National Board of Review.

Award	Date of ceremony	Category	Recipient(s)	Result	Ref.
Astra Film Awards	January 6, 2024	Best Comedy Feature	Theater Camp	Nominated	
Astra Film Awards	January 6, 2024	Best Song	"Camp Isn't Home"	Nominated	
Independent Spirit Awards	February 25, 2024	Best First Screenplay	Noah Galvin, Molly Gordon, Nick Lieberman, and Ben Platt	Nominated	
Independent Spirit Awards	February 25, 2024	Best Supporting Performance	Noah Galvin	Nominated	
Independent Spirit Awards	February 25, 2024	Best Editing	Jon Philpot	Nominated	
