= Noah Galvin =

American actor and singer (born 1994)

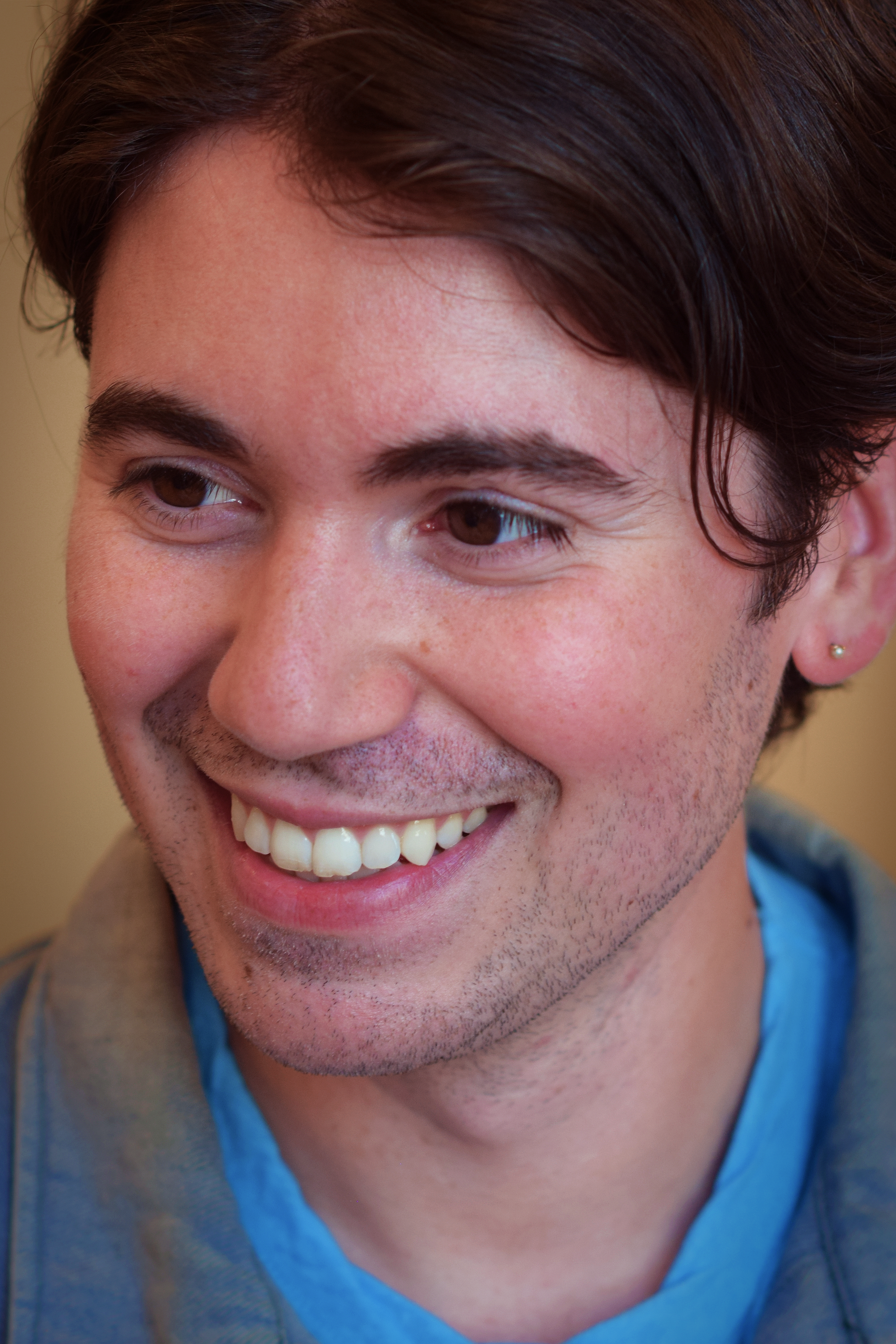
- Galvin in 2024
- Born: Noah Egidi Galvin; May 6, 1994 (age 32); Katonah, New York, U.S.
- Occupations: Actor; singer
- Years active: 2006–present
- Spouse: Ben Platt (m. 2024)

Noah Egidi Galvin (born May 6, 1994) is an American actor and singer. He portrayed Kenny O'Neal in the ABC sitcom The Real O'Neals and was the second person to perform the title role in the Broadway musical Dear Evan Hansen. He also played Dr. Asher Wolke in the TV series The Good Doctor, originated the role of the Duchess in the off-Broadway musical Alice by Heart, and sang as Brian on the cast recording of the musical adaptation of Goosebumps. For his performance in Theater Camp, Galvin received a nomination for Best Supporting Performance at the 39th Independent Spirit Awards.

== Early life ==
Galvin was born and raised in Katonah, New York. He has two siblings, including the multi-instrumentalist Yoke Lore. His father was Catholic, of Irish and Italian descent, and his mother, Abbie (née Fink), is Jewish. He was raised "both Jewish and Catholic going to CCD, Hebrew School and church", and has described himself as Jewish. Galvin's father, Austin, died in November 2023; he had Lewy body dementia.

== Acting career ==
Galvin starred in two seasons of The Real O'Neals before the show was cancelled in 2017. Prior to this, Galvin appeared Off-Broadway for companies such as Signature, Playwrights Horizons, MCC, The Public, The Culture Project, The Flea, The Wild Project, New York Theatre Workshop, the Barrow Street Theater, Rattlestick and Ensemble Studio Theater. His audiobook work includes Stephen Chbosky's The Perks of Being a Wallflower and Matthew Quick's Forgive Me, Leonard Peacock.

In August 2017, Galvin was named as a temporary replacement for the title role in Broadway's Dear Evan Hansen, assuming the role after Ben Platt's departure. Galvin took over the Evan role on November 21, 2017, and played his final performance on February 4, 2018. In May 2018, Galvin was announced as part of the ensemble for Olivia Wilde's directorial debut Booksmart. The film premiered at the South by Southwest film festival on March 10, 2019, and was released theatrically in the United States on May 24, 2019.

Galvin joined the Broadway production of Waitress, playing Ogie from April 29, 2019, to August 18, 2019, after which Todrick Hall took over the role. Galvin narrated the character part of Arthur in What If It's Us, a novel by Adam Silvera and Becky Albertalli. He also subsequently voiced the role of the character of Prince Rupert in the Gimlet podcast, The Two Princes, which was released on June 4, 2019.

On February 17, 2020, Galvin starred in Manhattan Concert Productions' one-night-only 50th anniversary concert presentation of Joseph and the Amazing Technicolor Dreamcoat at Lincoln Center.

In 2020, Galvin joined the fourth season of the television series The Good Doctor in the recurring role of Dr. Asher Wolke. In 2021, he was promoted to season regular for its fifth season. His final episode aired on April 2, 2024, during the show's seventh and final season.

On June 9, 2022, it was announced that Galvin would star in the musical comedy film Theater Camp, inspired by the 2020 short film of the same name co-written with his partner Ben Platt, Molly Gordon and Nick Lieberman. The film had its world premiere at the 2023 Sundance Film Festival on January 21, 2023, and was acquired shortly after by Searchlight Pictures for a theatrical release beginning July 14, 2023. The movie soundtrack featuring original songs written by Galvin, Platt, Gordon, and Lieberman was released on the same day by Interscope Records. The film was released on streaming service Hulu and VOD on September 14, 2023. For his role of Glenn Winthrop, Galvin received a Best Supporting Performance nomination at the 39th Independent Spirit Awards.

In December 2022, Galvin starred in Meet Cute's holiday romantic comedy, Christmasuzannukkah, with Amy Sedaris. "As a Jew who loves Christmas and Amy Sedaris, I jumped at the opportunity to celebrate both," he said. "I think everyone will find something to love about Christmasuzannukkah."

On August 29, 2024, it was announced that Galvin would star alongside Beanie Feldstein and Kevin McHale in the Kennedy Center's production of The 25th Annual Putnam County Spelling Bee from October 11–20, 2024.

In 2026, Galvin starred in the off-Broadway play The Reservoir where he was nominated for a Drama Desk for Outstanding Lead Performance in a Play.

== Personal life ==
Galvin is gay and came out to his mother when he was 14 years old. He splits his time between Manhattan and Los Angeles. On January 12, 2020, he began a relationship with Ben Platt. The pair first met in 2015 and Galvin later replaced Platt in the title role of Dear Evan Hansen in 2017. They announced their engagement on November 25, 2022, and were married over the Labor Day weekend on September 1, 2024.

== Acting credits ==
=== Film ===
Year	Title	Role	Notes
2013	Promised Land	Jackson	Short film
2014	Welcome to the Wayne	Leif Bornewell III	Short film
2018	Assassination Nation	Marty	
2019	Booksmart	George	
2020	Theater Camp	Bradley "Baby" Bjorn	Short film; also writer and producer
2023	Theater Camp	Glenn Winthrop	Also writer and producer

=== Television ===
Year	Title	Role	Note
2015	The Weekend Detectives	Josh	Episode: "Proof of Concept"
2016–2017	The Real O'Neals	Kenny O'Neal	Lead role; 29 episodes
2017	RuPaul's Drag Race	Himself (Judge)	Season 9, Episode 9
2020–2023	The Owl House	Jerbo	Voice, 3 episodes
2020–2024	The Good Doctor	Dr. Asher Wolke	Recurring role (Season 4); main role (Seasons 5–7)
2021	Zoey's Extraordinary Playlist	Therapy Patient	Episode: "Zoey's Extraordinary Double Date"
2021	The Other Two	Eddie	Episode: "Pat Connects With Her Fans"

=== Theatre ===
Year	Title	Role	Venue	Notes	Ref.
2005	Les Misérables	Gavroche	Various	National tour	
2006	The Who's Tommy	Tommy Walker	Bay Street Theatre	Regional	
2006	Ace	Billy Lucas	The Repertory Theatre	Regional	
2008	Norman's Ark	Harry Johnson	John Anson Ford Amphitheatre	Regional	
2008	Esther Demsack	Everette Brewster	The Public Theater	Off-Broadway	
2010	Our Town	Wally Webb	Barrow Street Theatre	Off-Broadway	
2010	The Burnt Part Boys	Dusty Rivers	Playwrights Horizons	Off-Broadway	
2011	Treasure Island	Jim Hawkins	Irondale Center	Off-Off-Broadway	
2013	The Power of Duff	Ricky Duff	Huntington Theatre Company	Regional	
2015	What I Did Last Summer	Charlie Higgins	Pershing Square Signature Center	Off-Broadway	
2017–2018	Dear Evan Hansen	Evan Hansen	Music Box Theatre	Broadway	
2019	Alice by Heart	Dodgy/Duchess/Dodo/Mock Mock Mock Mock Turtle	MCC Theater	Off-Broadway	
2019	Waitress	Ogie Anhorn	Brooks Atkinson Theater	Broadway	
2020	Joseph and the Amazing Technicolor Dreamcoat	Joseph	David Geffen Hall	Concert production	
2024	The 25th Annual Putnam County Spelling Bee	Leaf Coneybear	Kennedy Center	Regional	
2026	The Reservoir	Josh	Linda Gross Theater	Off-Broadway	
2026	Hit Machine	Alex	Soho Theatre	Off West End	

=== Audio ===
Year	Title	Role	Notes
2017	The Perks of Being a Wallflower	Charlie	Audiobook - Main role
2018	What If It's Us	Arthur Seuss	Audiobook - Main role
2018	The Courage To Be Disliked	Young Man	Audiobook - Main role
2019–2020	The Two Princes	Prince Rupert	Audio drama - Main role, three seasons
2021	Here's To Us	Arthur Seuss	Audiobook - Main role
2021	Goosebumps The Musical	Brian Colson	Original Studio Cast Recording
2022	Christmasuzannukah	Noah	Podcast - Main role

== Awards and nominations ==
Year	Award	Category	Work	Result	Ref.
2007	Kevin Kline Award	Outstanding Lead Actor in a Musical	Ace	Won	
2011	Lucille Lortel Award	Outstanding Featured Actor in a Play	The Burnt Part Boys	Nominated	
2023	Independent Spirit Awards	Best Supporting Performance	Theater Camp	Nominated	
2026	Drama Desk Award	Outstanding Lead Performance in a Play	The Reservoir	Nominated	
2026	Lucille Lortel Award	Outstanding Lead Performer in a Play	The Reservoir	Nominated	

== See also ==
- LGBT culture in New York City
- List of LGBT people from New York City
