= Nick Lieberman =

American filmmaker

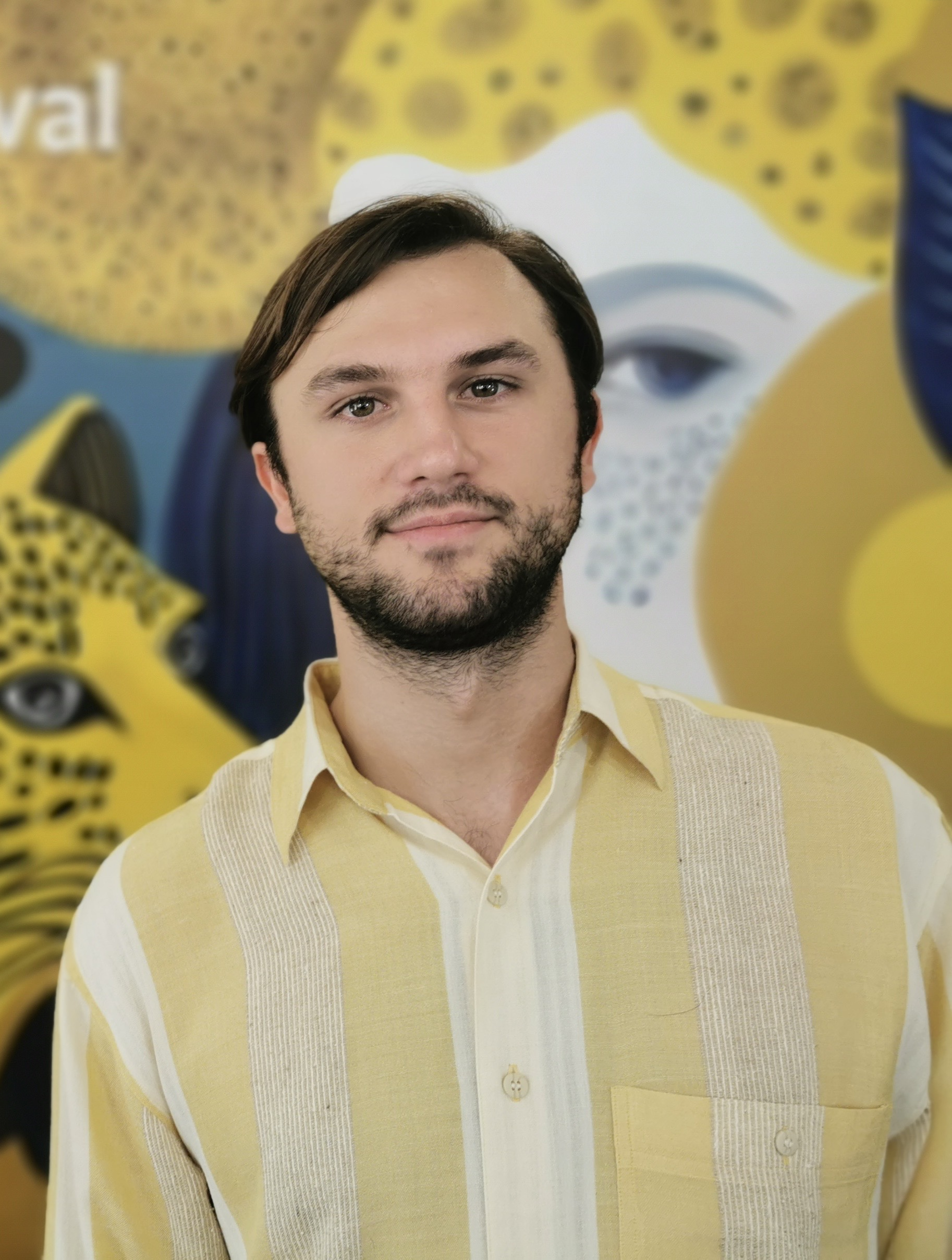
- Lieberman in 2023
- Occupations: director; screenwriter; producer; editor; cinematographer
- Years active: 2011–present
- Parents: Robert Lieberman (father); Marilu Henner (mother)

Nick Lieberman is an American filmmaker and son of Robert Lieberman and Marilu Henner. He is best known for his work on the independent mockumentary comedy film Theater Camp (2023), a feature adaptation of the 2020 short film of the same name, which he co-directed with Molly Gordon and co-wrote the screenplay with Gordon and actors Ben Platt and Noah Galvin. His breakthrough feature, it received positive reviews and was purchased by Searchlight Pictures for $8 million and was given a limited theatrical release. Prior to this, he worked on commercial projects for Samsung, Billboard, and Fendi, and music videos with artists such as Ben Platt and Remi Wolf.

== Filmography ==
- Theater Camp (2020), short film
- Theater Camp (2023), feature film, co-directed with Molly Gordon
