= Molly Gordon =

American actress (born 1994)

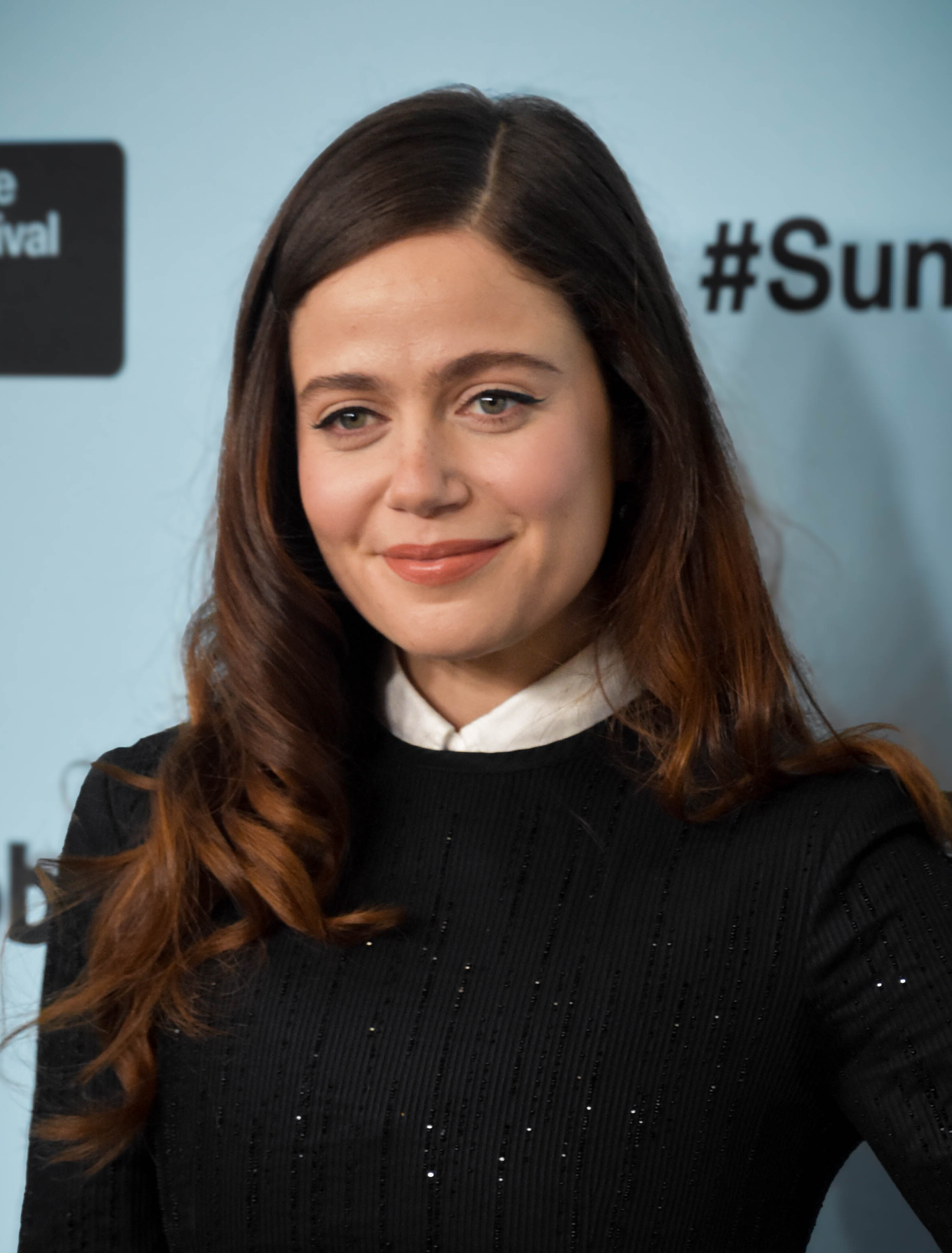
- Gordon in 2025
- Born: December 6, 1994 (age 31); Los Angeles, California, U.S.
- Occupations: Actress; director; writer
- Years active: 2001–present
- Parents: Bryan Gordon; Jessie Nelson

Molly Gordon (born December 6, 1994) is an American actress and filmmaker. She started her career in supporting roles in the studio comedy films Life of the Party (2018), and Good Boys (2019) followed by roles in independent comedy films such as Booksmart (2019), Shiva Baby (2020) and Am I OK? (2022). Gordon co-directed, co-wrote and starred in the musical comedy film Theater Camp (2023), and co-wrote and starred in Oh, Hi! (2025). On television, she portrayed Claire Dunlap in the FX on Hulu series The Bear (2023–2026), and has had recurring roles in Animal Kingdom (2016–2018) and the dramedy series Ramy (2022–2023).

== Early life ==
Gordon was born and raised in Los Angeles, to Jewish parents. She is the daughter of director Bryan Gordon and writer–director Jessie Nelson. She performed on the LA stage from a young age, and grew up with actor Ben Platt, with whom she starred in productions of Fiddler on the Roof at age four and How to Succeed in Business Without Really Trying at age five. Along with Platt and Beanie Feldstein, another childhood friend, Gordon formed a group called the Theater Geeks of America, which often performed at local retirement homes. She regularly watched the sketch-comedy series Saturday Night Live and attended performances by comedy troupe The Groundlings, leading her to an interest pursuing comedic acting. She portrayed Dot in her high school's performance of Sunday in the Park with George when she was 17. She briefly attended New York University, leaving after two weeks due to dissatisfaction with her program, and instead enrolled in night classes and worked as a hostess at Balthazar.

== Career ==
Gordon's first film appearance was in Nelson's 2001 drama film I Am Sam as Callie, followed by her portrayal of a trick-or-treater in Nora Ephron's 2005 film Bewitched.

Gordon moved to New York City in 2014 to attend New York University and to pursue acting as a profession. After leaving NYU, she performed in various minor roles in off-Broadway, television, and film productions. In August 2015, she was cast as Nicky in the TNT pilot Animal Kingdom, based on the 2010 Australian film of the same name. The pilot was picked up with a 10-episode order in December 2015, and the series debuted on June 14, 2016, with Gordon as a series regular, leaving in season 3 out of 6.

She played Maddie, the daughter of Melissa McCarthy's character, in the 2018 comedy film Life of the Party.

Gordon began rehearsals to portray Alice Spencer in the Off-Broadway production of Alice by Heart in December 2018. The musical was directed and co-written by her mother, Jessie Nelson, and Steven Sater, and opened at the MCC Theater on February 26, 2019. The show's run concluded in May 2019. Gordon portrayed Annabelle, or "Triple A," in the 2019 comedy film Booksmart, directed by Olivia Wilde. The film attracted Gordon due to its "kooky" characters that she found to "have such a grounded realism in them." In 2019, she also appeared in three episodes of Ramy Youssef and Chris Storer's Ramy.

In 2021, Gordon appeared in Emma Seligman's debut feature film Shiva Baby, playing Rachel Sennott's ex-girlfriend, Maya.

On June 9, 2022, it was announced that Gordon would produce, star in, and co-direct the musical comedy film Theater Camp, inspired by the 2020 short film of the same name cowritten with Noah Galvin, Ben Platt, and Nick Lieberman. In the film, Gordon portrays Rebecca-Diane, the musical director at AdirondACTS, a children's summer camp. The film had its world premiere at the 2023 Sundance Film Festival on January 21, 2023. While editing the film, Gordon was offered the role of Claire Dunlap, an emergency-room physician and Carmy Berzatto's love interest, in the second season of The Bear, which premiered in June 2023. She starred in and co-wrote the story for Oh, Hi!, directed and written by Sophie Brooks, premiering at the 2025 Sundance Film Festival. In 2026, Gordon played Rebecca Hampstead, the daughter of Hugh Jackman's character in the comedy film The Sheep Detectives, adapted from the 2005 book Three Bags Full.

== Acting credits ==
=== Film ===
Year	Title	Role	Notes
2001	I Am Sam	Callie	
2005	Bewitched	Trick-Or-Treater	
2015	Ithaca	Mary Arena	
2015	Love the Coopers	Lauren Hesselberg	
2018	Life of the Party	Maddie Miles	
2019	Booksmart	Annabelle "Triple A"	
2019	Good Boys	Hannah	
2020	Theater Camp	Silvia Ray	Short film, also writer and producer
2020	Shiva Baby	Maya	
2020	The Broken Hearts Gallery	Amanda	
2022	Am I OK?	Kat	
2022	There There	English Teacher	
2023	You People	Liza	
2023	Theater Camp	Rebecca-Diane	Also co-director, screenwriter, and producer
2025	Oh, Hi!	Iris	Also writer
2026	The Sheep Detectives	Rebecca Hampstead-Hardy	
TBA	Peaked †	Bobby	Also director and co-writer, Filming

=== Television ===
Year	Title	Role	Notes
2015	Sin City Saints	Megan	Episode: "Because Vegas"
2015	Orange Is the New Black	Stacy	Episode: "Don't Make Me Come Back There"
2016–2018	Animal Kingdom	Nicky Belmont	Main role, 30 episodes
2018	Our Cartoon President	Sarah Huckabee Sanders (voice)	Recurring role, 9 episodes
2019–2022	Ramy	Sarah	Recurring role, 3 episodes
2022–2023	Winning Time: The Rise of the Lakers Dynasty	Linda Zafrani	Main role, 17 episodes
2023–2026	The Bear	Claire Dunlap	Recurring role, 16 episodes

=== Theatre ===
Year	Title	Role	Venue	Notes
2014	Sweeney Todd: The Demon Barber of Fleet Street	Ensemble	Avery Fisher Hall	Concert
2014	Alice by Heart	Alice Spencer	Wheeler Opera House	Workshop
2015	Alice by Heart	Alice Spencer	MCC Theater	Workshop
2018	Alice by Heart	Alice Spencer	Vogelstein Center	Workshop
2019	Alice by Heart	Alice Spencer	MCC Theater	Off-Broadway

=== Podcasts ===
Year	Title	Role	Ref.
2022	The Big Lie	Young Woman	

== Awards and nominations ==
Year	Association	Category	Project	Result	Ref.
2023	Hollywood Music in Media Awards	Best Music Themed Film or Musical	Theater Camp	Nominated	
2023	Las Vegas Film Critics Society Awards	Breakout Filmmaker of the Year	Theater Camp	Nominated	
2023	Locarno Film Festival	Prix du public UBS (Audience Award)	Theater Camp	Nominated	
2023	Seattle International Film Festival	Best Film	Theater Camp	First runner-up	
2023	Seattle International Film Festival	Best Futurewave Feature	Theater Camp	Nominated	
2023	Sundance Film Festival	Grand Jury Prize (Dramatic)	Theater Camp	Nominated	
2023	Sundance Film Festival	Jury Award	Theater Camp	Won	
2024	Astra Film Awards	Best Song	"Camp Isn't Home" (from Theater Camp)	Nominated	
2024	Screen Actors Guild Awards	Outstanding Ensemble in a Comedy Series	The Bear	Won	
2024	Independent Spirit Awards	Best First Screenplay	Theater Camp	Nominated	
