= Roman Holiday (musical) =

- Promotional artwork
- Music: Cole Porter
- Lyrics: Cole Porter
- Book: Paul Blake, Kathy Speer, and Terry Grossman
- Setting: Rome
- Basis: 1953 film Roman Holiday
- Premiere: July 9, 2001: The Muny, St. Louis, Missouri
- Productions: 2001 St. Louis, Missouri; 2012 Minneapolis, Minnesota; 2017 San Francisco, California

Roman Holiday is a jukebox musical with music and lyrics by Cole Porter, and a book by Paul Blake. Based on the 1953 film of the same name, the musical tells the story of a young European princess and the American reporter who inadvertently aids in her escape from a whirlwind European tour, resulting in 24 hours spent in Italy's capital.

== Productions ==
Roman Holiday: the Cole Porter Musical debuted at The Muny in St. Louis, Missouri on July 9, 2001. There was a reading for the Guthrie Theatre 2012 production starring Laura Osnes and John Behlmann. A production of Roman Holiday opened the Guthrie Theatre in Minneapolis, Minnesota in 2012 from June 9 to August 19 After a substantial book rewrite and recruiting a new director, the revised production announced a pre-broadway run at the Golden Gate Theatre in San Francisco during May–June 2017, starring Stephanie Styles and Drew Gehling.

== Musical numbers ==
Guthrie Theater

Act I

- "Overture"
- "Once Upon a Time" – Princess
- "I'm Throwing a Ball Tonight" – Joe, Ensemble
- "Experiment" – Countess, Princess
- "Why Shouldn't I?" – Princess
- "Ace In the Hole" – Joe, Ensemble
- "Let's Be Buddies" – Joe, Princess
- "Look What I Found" – Joe, Princess, Ensemble
- "Wouldn't It Be Fun?" – Irving, Princess, Joe
- "Most Gentlemen Don't Like Love" – Francesca, Princess
- "Ridin' High" – Joe, Princess, Ensemble

Act II

- "Entr'acte"
- "A Picture of Me Without You" – Joe, Princess, Irving
- "Use Your Imagination" – Princess, Joe
- "Just One of Those Things" – Francesca, Male Quartet
- "Easy to Love" – Joe
- "Ev'ry Time We Say Goodbye" – Princess, Joe
- "I Sleep Easier Now" – Countess
- "Night and Day" – Joe
- "Experiment (Reprise)" – Princess

Golden Gate Theatre

Act I

- "Why Shouldn't I" – Princess
- "You Do Something to Me" – Francesca and Ensemble
- "Take Me Back to Manhattan" – Joe, Irving and Ensemble
- "Let's Step Out" – Princess
- "Let's Step Out (Reprise)" – Princess
- "Experiment" – Joe
- "Experiment Ballet" – Princess, Joe and Ensemble
- "Look What I Found" – Joe, Princess and Ensemble
- "Night and Day" – Irving and Francesca
- "Look What I Found (Reprise)" – Princess, Joe and Irving
- "Ridin' High" – Joe, Princess and Ensemble
- "Why Shouldn't I (Reprise)" – Princess

Act II

- "Most Gentlemen Don't Like Love" – Francesca and Ladies
- "Night and Day (Reprise)" – Irving
- "Use Your Imagination" – Princess and Joe
- "Begin the Beguine" – Francesca and Men
- "You Do Something to Me (Reprise)" – Irving and Francesca
- "Easy to Love" – Joe
- "Goodbye, Little Dream" – Princess
- "Just One of Those Things" – Princess and Joe
- "Experiment (Reprise)" – Princess

== Characters and original cast ==
Character	The Muny (2001)	Guthrie Reading (2012)	Guthrie Theater (2012)	Workshop (2016)	Golden Gate Theatre (2017)	Shanghai Reading (2018)
Princess Ann	Catherine Brunell	Laura Osnes	Stephanie Rothenberg	Laura Osnes	Stephanie Styles	Lorna Want
Joe Bradley	Jeff McCarthy	John Behlmann	Edward Watts	Drew Gehling	Drew Gehling	Michael Xavier
Francesca Cervelli	Priscilla Lopez		Christina Baldwin		Sara Chase	Sara Chase
Irving Radovich	Jim Walton		Jim Stanek		Jarrod Spector	
Countess	Karen Morrow		Michelle Barber		Georgia Engel	
