= Goosebumps The Musical =

Musical by John Maclay and Danny Abosch

- Phantom of the Auditorium
- Show logo
- Music: Danny Abosch
- Lyrics: John Maclay and Danny Abosch
- Book: John Maclay
- Basis: Based on Goosebumps: Phantom of the Auditorium by R.L. Stine
- Productions: 2016 world premiere

Goosebumps The Musical: Phantom of the Auditorium (also known as Goosebumps The Musical) is a musical with book and lyrics by John Maclay, and music and lyrics by Danny Abosch. It is based on Phantom of the Auditorium, book 24 of the bestselling Goosebumps book series by R.L. Stine, published by Scholastic Publishing.

== Productions ==
The musical was co-commissioned by First Stage Children's Theater and Oregon Children's Theatre, and received simultaneous World Premiere productions in Fall 2016 at the Todd Wehr Theater in Milwaukee, Wisconsin and the Newmark Theatre in Portland, Oregon. The Wisconsin production, directed by Niffer Clarke, ran from October 14 to November 13, 2016. The Oregon production, directed by Stan Foote, ran from October 22 to November 20, 2016. Both productions were well received by local reviewers. Goosebumps was also performed at Roanoke Children's Theatre in Roanoke, Virginia as the first show in their 2017–2018 season. The musical has since been produced at other theaters throughout the country.

== Plot synopsis ==
=== Act I ===
Before the action of the play, the company comes together to deliver a warning and an invitation to join them as they recount their spooky tale ("Goosebumps").

The story begins and we meet our heroine, Brooke, her best friend Zeke, and their classmates at Woods Mill Middle School. The halls are filled with the excited chatter of the students as the news spreads that this year's musical will be ("A Super Scary Play") called The Phantom. When Ms. Walker posts the cast list, Brooke and Zeke are excited to be cast as the leads, as they both love all things spooky and scary.

Rumor has it that the play is cursed. Though Ms. Walker tries to dispel the rumor, Tina, Brooke's understudy, recounts ("The Legend") of the first production 73 years ago at their very school. Ms. Walker's great grandmother, Abigail, tried to stage the play, but the boy who played the titular character vanished on opening night without a trace. The principal ordered all copies of the script be destroyed, though Abigail kept a copy in secret. Rumor has it the spirit of the boy still haunts the school, ensuring the play will never be performed.

Brooke and Zeke sneak back to the stage after rehearsal to get a better look at the trap door, put in for the play but which never has a chance to be used during the first production. Despite Ms. Walker's warning that the trap door is not safe, curiosity gets the better of Brooke and Zeke and they pull the lever and the platform plunges deep below the stage. Spooked out my what could be lurking in the darkness, they leave and make their way back to the stage. Waiting for them is the school's night janitor, Emile, who warns them to be careful or they may fall to their deaths ("Watch Your Step").

The next day, Brooke finds a creepy mask and an ominous note in her locker which proclaims "STAY AWAY FROM MY HOME SWEET HOME". Brooke thinks this is Zeke playing a joke.

Brooke shows up early for drama class, only to find an unfamiliar, and cute, boy sitting in her chair. The boy introduces himself as Brian and the two share an embarrassing, yet sweet, conversation as they introduce themselves in which Brooke can't stop babbling ("Babbling Brooke"). Brian, having moved after roles were cast, is assigned to help Tina with the scenery.

Zeke admits to Brooke that he hasn't read the play, leading to her detailing to Zeke ("The Story of the Phantom"). This play-within-the-play very much mimics the plot of Andrew Lloyd Webber's The Phantom of the Opera. The play takes place in an old theater rumored to be haunted by the titular character, The Phantom. The Phantom is not a ghost, but actually a previously renowned composer, now living in the tunnels underneath the theater due to the scars disfiguring his face making him an outcast from society. The play's heroine, Esmerelda, sees through the Phantom's outward appearance to the misunderstood artist beneath, though she is torn between her love for the Phantom and her love for her childhood friend Raoul. Raoul later attacks and kills the Phantom, who accepts his death, knowing he could never live without Esmerelda. A devastated Esmerelda flees and is never seen or heard from again. After his death, the Phantom's body disappears and it is said his spirit still haunts the theater, longing to sing one last song with his beloved Esmerelda.

There is a blackout during play rehearsal the next day and a mysterious figure dressed as the Phantom appears above the actors under a single spotlight. In a haunting voice, the figure warns the actors to "Stay away from my home sweet home!" ("Stay Away"). An ominous laugh echoes as the scene fades to black.

=== Act II ===
Shortly after the appearance of the Phantom ("Entr’acte"), Brooke confronts Zeke, telling him that he didn't scare her with his prank in rehearsal. However, Zeke insists that he doesn't know what she's talking about, claiming he was at the dentist.

During rehearsal that day, the Phantom again shows, swinging down on a rope and yelling at Brooke to “Stay away from my home sweet home!”. Brooke collapses to the floor in shock, and the Phantom disappears.("Is Somebody Down There?") As Brian rushes to Brooke's side, she starts to come to, but she looks cold and pale—as if she's seen a ghost.

After school, Tina leaves a voicemail for Brooke, wishing her well while trying to get her to quit the play and let Tina play Esmerelda's role. She also tries to get Ms. Walker to give her the part to no success. ("Understudy Buddy").

The next day, Zeke, Brian, and Brooke discover a message scrawled on the backdrop in red paint: “STAY AWAY FROM MY HOME SWEET HOME!” Brian is angered that Zeke would vandalize the backdrop, but Brooke insists that Zeke wouldn't do something like this. Tina, Ms. Walker, and Principal Stine discover the damage, when Tina discovers a trail of paint drops leading Zeke's locker, upon opening it they find a fresh can of red paint. Zeke denies the vandalism to no avail. Zeke suggests Emile planted the can, being the night janitor. Principal Stine reveals that the school has no night janitor. Ms. Walker informs Zeke that he is out of the play, if they don't have to cancel it altogether. Principal Stine adds that Zeke might be facing suspension or even harsher punishments.

Brooke, Zeke, and Brian decide to take matters into their own hands to save the play. They go through the likely suspects, ultimately deciding to investigate the trapdoor, as the Phantom only started appearing after they opened it ("Whodunit?").

Once again, the three sneak into the auditorium. Brian starts to get nervous, but is moved forward with Brooke's encouragement. Zeke gives the lever a pull, and the three go down once more, leading them into the sub-basement ("The Trapdoor").

Exploring the sub-basement leads the kids to Emile, who has been living there. He reveals there is no Phantom, and that he just used the legend to keep them away from his home. He explains that he really was a janitor many years ago, but when the school laid him off, he fell on hard times. With nowhere else to go, he figured he could live here until he got back on his feet ("Home Sweet Home"). But when the play caused the trapdoor to start being used again, he feared he would soon be found out. Zeke promises they won't tell a soul. “No,” Emile replies, “I don't imagine you will.” The trio screams, and before Emile can explain, they start to run, eventually escaping via the elevator.

The next day, Ms. Walker tells the students that a search found no sign of anyone living in the sub-basement, even the furniture they claim to have seen seeming to vanish. Nonetheless, she believes them, as they all have the same story. Zeke is cleared and returns the play.

After a few weeks of rehearsal, opening night finally arrives ("Opening Night"). Tina tells Brooke to break a leg, sincerely adding she's actually really great in the show. Zeke enters the backstage area in costume, but is dragged off by the Phantom in an identical costume. ("One Last Goal")

The play begins ("The Performance"). The Phantom enters, and Brooke, upon seeing the Phantom's green eyes behind the mask, realizes instantly it isn't Zeke. She feels that something about him is very familiar. “Please trust me,” the Phantom whispers.

Brooke and the Phantom perform the play, where he reveals how he came to be ("My Story"). The Phantom says he was cast in a play which was to be performed on that very stage. In the darkness, he couldn't see where he was going, and, unaware that his trapdoor had been left open, fell through the opening in the stage to his death. He's been haunting this theater not to prevent the play from being performed, but hoping it would be, so that he could finally perform his starring role. He is glad he has done so, but finds it bittersweet, as it means he'll have to say goodbye to someone special- "Esmerelda". He claims meeting her has made all of his suffering worthwhile, but as much as he wishes he could stay, he must move on, his one last goal now accomplished. The Phantom speaks directly to Brooke, “Thank you, for giving me an ending to my tragic play.” He backs off the stage and disappears in a burst of fog. The audience roars as the lights fade.

After the show, Ms. Walker congratulates the cast on a tremendous performance. She compliments Zeke on his performance to Brooke, albeit a bit peeved he changed lines on opening night. Brooke finds Zeke, who is shocked to learn that the show already happened, deducting he had been knocked out. Brooke tells him that someone else performed his role, and she thinks it was the boy from the first production, 73 years ago. Before Zeke can process this, the Phantom emerges from the shadows. Brooke rushes to him, and when she reaches to remove his mask, he does not resist, wanting her to finally know the truth. ("The Phantom Unmasked") Brooke sees that the Phantom is actually Brian. There is a blinding burst of light, followed by darkness. When lights return, Brian is gone. Brooke and Zeke are alone on the auditorium stage, Brooke still holding Brian's mask. Lights flicker as Brian's ghostly voice fills the auditorium: “Goodbye, Brooke.” Brooke instinctively grabs Zeke's hand as lights fade to black.

The show ends in the dimly lit cemetery we saw earlier, with a new smaller tombstone that dates back 73 years. The Company member who played Brooke enters alone and lays a rose at the grave. Slowly, through the swirls of fog, the rest of the Company members start to appear. They come together and remind us once more of their warning—that their tale would fill our souls with fright and give us goosebumps in the night. ("Goosebumps (Reprise)")

== Cast recording ==
On 29 October 2021, the Original Studio Cast Recording was released, featuring Krystina Alabado (Mean Girls) as Brooke, Noah Galvin (Dear Evan Hansen) as Brian, Will Roland (Be More Chill) as Zeke, and R. L. Stine, as well as Tony Award nominees Alex Brightman (Beetlejuice, School of Rock) as Emile, Sheryl Lee Ralph (Dreamgirls) as Ms. Walker, and Stephanie Styles (Kiss Me, Kate) as Tina. The ensemble features Arianny Escalona, Alex Gibson, AJ Lewis, Armenia Sarkissian, Shuba Vedula, and Aika Zabala.

== Song list ==
- Goosebumps (Company)
- A Super Scary Play (Brooke, Zeke, Ensemble)
- The Legend (Ms. Walker, Tina)
- Watch Your Step (Emile)
- Babbling Brooke (Brooke, Brian)
- The Story Of The Phantom (Brooke, Zeke)
- Stay Away (Brooke, Emile, Brian, Zeke, Ms Walker, Ensemble)
- Entr'act (Ensemble)
- Is Somebody Down There? (Brooke, Emile, Brian, Zeke, Ms Walker, Tina)
- Understudy Buddy (Tina, Ms Walker)
- Whodunit? (Zeke, Brooke, Ms Walker, Brian)
- The Trapdoor (Brooke, Brian, Zeke)
- My Home Sweet Home (Emile, Brooke, Brian, Zeke)
- Opening Night (Orchestra)
- One Last Goal (Orchestra)
- The Performance (Orchestra)
- My Story (Brian)
- The Phantom Unmasked (Brooke, Zeke, Ms Walker, Brian, Ensemble)
- Goosebumps (Reprise) (Company)
