= Natacha Karam =

British actress (born 1994)

- Born: 3 April 1994 (age 32); Jeddah, Saudi Arabia
- Citizenship: Ireland
- Occupation: Actress
- Years active: 2017–present
- Partner(s): John Clarence Stewart (2020–present; engaged)

Natacha Karam (born 3 April 1994) is a Saudi Arabian-born Irish and Lebanese actress. She is best known for playing action heroes, such as Jasmine "Jaz" Khan in The Brave and Marjan Marwani in 9-1-1: Lone Star.

== Biography ==
On 3 April 1994 (32 years ago), Karam was born in Jeddah, where her family was stationed, to a Northern Irish mother and a Lebanese-French father.

While Karam was growing up, her family moved around to places including Ireland, Saudi Arabia, Jordan, Bahrain, and Dubai.

In 2012, at the age of 18, Karam completed her A Levels at Dubai College, a private junior high and high school.

In 2014, at the age of 20, Karam graduated from the City Literary Institute, a community college in London.

== Career ==
In 2017, Karam began her acting career with one-off appearances in television series Silent Witness and Homeland, along with an appearance in the TV film Valentine's Again (2017).

Later in 2017, Karam landed her first major role when she was cast as Sergeant Jasmine "Jaz" Khan on the military action drama series The Brave, which ran for one season of 13 episodes on NBC.

In 2018, Karam made an appearance in the film The Hurricane Heist (2018).

In 2019, Karam appeared in an episode of the 34th season of the TV series Casualty.

In 2020, Karam appeared in the Netflix film The Old Guard (2020), in which she played the role of "Dizzy".

From 2020 to 2025, Karam was part of the main cast of the procedural drama series 9-1-1: Lone Star on Fox, playing the role of firefighter "Marjan Marwani".

In 2026, Karam guest starred on The Faithful: Women of the Bible (S01 E01-02) in the role of "Hagar", an Egyptian slave who enters the service of "Sarai" (later "Sarah"), the wife of "Abram" (later "Abraham").

== Personal life ==
Karam got engaged to her partner, actor John Clarence Stewart. She announced the engagement on her official Natacha Karam Instagram, sharing a heartfelt message about their relationship in June 2026.

This comes after the pair shared the screen on 9-1-1: Lone Star, where Stewart made a guest appearance as Joe, the on-screen partner and eventual television husband of Karam's character, Marjan Marwani

== Filmography ==
=== Film ===
Year	Title	Role	Notes
2017	Valentine's Again	Melissa	TV movie
2017	Valentine's Again	Melissa	Short
2018	The Hurricane Heist	Laurie	
2020	The Old Guard	Dizzy	

=== Television ===
Year	Title	Role	Notes
2017	Silent Witness	Tamara	Episode: "Identity: Part 1"
2017	Homeland	Mina Becker	Episode: "The Covenant"
2017–2018	The Brave	Jasmine "Jaz" Khan	Main role; 13 episodes
2019	Casualty	Ambi Busnal	Episode: "Episode #34.14"
2020–2025	9-1-1: Lone Star	Marjan Marwani	Main role; 72 episodes
2026	The Faithful: Women of the Bible	Hagar	2 episodes
