= What/If =

American television thriller miniseries (2019)

- Genre: Thriller
- Created by: Mike Kelley
- Starring: Jane Levy; Blake Jenner; Keith Powers; Samantha Marie Ware; Juan Castano; Dave Annable; Saamer Usmani; Daniella Pineda; John Clarence Stewart; Louis Herthum; Renée Zellweger
- Composer: Fil Eisler
- Country of origin: United States
- Original language: English
- No. of seasons: 1
- No. of episodes: 10

Production
- Executive producers: Mike Kelley; Melissa Loy; Alex Gartner; Charles Roven; Phillip Noyce; David Graziano; Robert Zemeckis; Jack Rapke
- Producer: Stephen Sassen
- Cinematography: Jeffrey C. Mygatt
- Editors: Mark Manos; Sue Blainey; Adam Bluming; Leah Breuer; Greg Babor
- Camera setup: Single-camera
- Running time: 44–56 minutes
- Production companies: Page Fright; Atlas Entertainment; Compari Entertainment; Warner Bros. Television

Original release
- Network: Netflix
- Release: May 24, 2019

What/If is an American thriller miniseries, created by Mike Kelley, that premiered on May 24, 2019, on Netflix. The series stars Jane Levy, Blake Jenner, Daniella Pineda, Keith Powers, Samantha Marie Ware, Dave Annable, Saamer Usmani, John Clarence Stewart, Louis Herthum, and Renée Zellweger.

== Premise ==
What/If is a neo-noir thriller that, according to Deadline Hollywood's Nellie Andreeva, explores "the ripple effects of what happens when acceptable people start doing unacceptable things. Each season will tackle a different morality tale inspired by culturally consequential source material, and the power of a single fateful decision to change the trajectory of an entire life."

== Cast and characters ==
=== Main ===
- Jane Levy as Lisa Ruiz-Donovan, the CEO and founder of a biotech startup called Emigen Molecular Sequencing
- Blake Jenner as Sean Donovan, Lisa's husband. A former pitcher for the San Francisco Giants, he now works as an EMT.
- Keith Powers as Todd Archer, Sean's best friend since high school. He works with Sean as a fellow EMT.
- Samantha Marie Ware as Angela Archer, Todd's wife. A surgical resident, she has been having an affair with Ian Evans.
- Juan Castano as Marcos Ruiz, Lisa's brother and an attorney
- Dave Annable as Dr. Ian Evans, the chief of surgery, who has been having an affair with Angela Archer
- Saamer Usmani as Avery Watkins, the new COO of Emigen Molecular Sequencing
- Daniella Pineda as Cassidy Barrett, Lisa's best friend and the CFO of Emigen Molecular Sequencing
- John Clarence Stewart as Lionel, Marcos' boyfriend and a real estate broker
- Louis Herthum as Foster, Anne's right-hand man
- Renée Zellweger as Anne Montgomery, a venture capitalist based in San Francisco

=== Recurring ===
- Derek Smith as Kevin, a go-go boy with whom Marcos and Lionel have slept with
- Nana Ghana as Sophie
- Monique Kim as Miles
- Allie MacDonald as Maddie Carter, Sean's ex-girlfriend
- Gabriel Mann as Gage Scott, Anne's business frenemy
- Julian Sands as Liam Strom, Anne's financial backer and mentor

=== Guest ===
- Marissa Cuevas as Christine, a former high-school cheer captain
- Keegan Allen as Billy, Christine's ex-boyfriend from high school and a commercial director

== Production ==
=== Development ===
On August 17, 2018, it was announced that Netflix had given the production a series order for a first season consisting of ten episodes. The series was created by Mike Kelley who was also expected to write for the series. Executive producers were slated to include Kelley, Melissa Loy, Alex Gartner, Charles Roven, Robert Zemeckis, and Jack Rapke. Additionally, Jackie Levine was slated to serve as a co-executive producer and Phillip Noyce was expected to direct and executive produce the first two episodes. Production companies involved with the series were expected to consist of Page Fright, Atlas Entertainment, Compari Entertainment, and Warner Bros. Television. On April 23, 2019, it was announced that the series would premiere on May 24, 2019.

=== Casting ===
Alongside the series order announcement, it was confirmed that Renée Zellweger had been cast in the series' lead role. In August 2018, it was announced that Jane Levy and Blake Jenner had joined the cast in starring roles. In September 2018, it was reported that Samantha Ware, Juan Castano, Keith Powers, Saamer Usmani, Dave Annable, and Louis Herthum had been cast in the series with Herthum in a recurring role.

In December 2018, it was announced that Daniella Pineda had joined the main cast in a series regular role and that Tyler Ross, Derek Smith, Nana Ghana, Monique Kim, and Marissa Cuevas would appear in a recurring capacity.

== Episodes ==
No.	Title	Directed by	Written by	Original release date	Prod. code
1	"Pilot"	Phillip Noyce	Mike Kelley	May 24, 2019	T13.21401
2	"What Now"	Phillip Noyce	Mike Kelley	May 24, 2019	T13.21402
3	"What Happened"	Russell Fine	David Graziano	May 24, 2019	T13.21403
4	"What Drama"	Jessika Borsiczky	Robin Wasserman	May 24, 2019	T13.21404
5	"What Next"	Fernando Coimbra & Jill Maxcy	Blair Singer	May 24, 2019	T13.21405
6	"What History"	Joanna Kerns	Brenna Kouf	May 24, 2019	T13.21406
7	"What Ghosts"	David Rodriguez	Elizabeth Benjamin	May 24, 2019	T13.21407
8	"What Secrets"	Maggie Kiley	Blair Singer & Mike Kelley	May 24, 2019	T13.21408
9	"WTF"	J. Miller Tobin	David Graziano & Robin Wasserman	May 24, 2019	T13.21409
10	"What Remains"	Randy Zisk	Mike Kelley	May 24, 2019	T13.21410

== Release ==
On April 23, 2019, the official teaser for the series was released. On May 13, 2019, Netflix released the official trailer for the first season.

== Reception ==
On review aggregator Rotten Tomatoes, the series holds an approval rating of 44% based on 32 reviews, with an average rating of 5.35/10. The website's critical consensus reads, "A deliriously delicious performance from Renée Zellweger can't save What/If from its own mediocrity, but boy is she fun to watch." On Metacritic, it has a weighted average score of 58 out of 100, based on 12 critics, indicating "mixed or average reviews".

Haider Rifaat of The Express Tribune wrote, "The writing is pretty much the heart of the show. Immaculate dialogues, nuanced characters and relationships, both broken and unscathed, are a few exciting features that make it compelling. Not to forgo the incredible acting prowess of Zellweger, who impeccably embraces the character of Anne. Subtle gestures, symbolic interaction and character development are some commendable aspects that intensify the actors’ performances." NPR's Linda Holmes concluded: "... it's not a good show, but it's entertaining in a very specific way. Zellweger has sunk her teeth so deeply into this notion of Welcome To Rich Prowling Cougartown that she's practically licking up bowls of milk. Everything in What/If is forever being revealed and unfurled and figuratively glitter-bombed, and if I were trying to distract myself from the problems of the world and had perhaps a tankard of wine and a dear friend at my disposal, I just might put my head on a fuzzy pillow and fire it up."
