= The Brave (TV series) =

American military drama television series

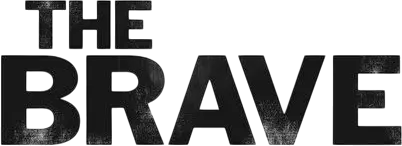
- Genre: Action; Drama; Military
- Created by: Dean Georgaris
- Starring: Anne Heche; Mike Vogel; Tate Ellington; Demetrius Grosse; Natacha Karam; Noah Mills; Sofia Pernas; Hadi Tabbal
- Composer: Toby Chu
- Country of origin: United States
- Original language: English
- No. of seasons: 1
- No. of episodes: 13

Production
- Executive producers: Brad Anderson; Avi Nir; Alon Shtruzman; Peter Traugott; Rachel Kaplan; Karni Ziv; Dean Georgaris; Matt Corman; Chris Ord
- Producer: Ben Rimmer
- Cinematography: Mike Spragg, BSC
- Editor: Jim Page
- Camera setup: Single-camera
- Running time: 42–43 minutes
- Production companies: Keshet International; Universal Television

Original release
- Network: NBC
- Release: September 25, 2017 – January 29, 2018

The Brave is an American military action drama series which depicted the missions of an elite covert operations team of the Defense Intelligence Agency (DIA), the Defense Clandestine Service. It stars Anne Heche and Mike Vogel, and was created by Dean Georgaris. The series premiered on September 25, 2017, on NBC and was canceled on May 11, 2018 after one season.

== Synopsis ==
The series revolves around the professional and personal sacrifices that the military has to face in war missions similar to the CIA's Special Operations Group. Patricia Campbell (Anne Heche), deputy director of the Defense Intelligence Agency, and her team of analysts have the most advanced surveillance technology in their hands. Captain Adam Dalton (Mike Vogel), communications director for the team and a former Delta Force operator, has the mission of finding an American doctor, who was kidnapped, and must make the mission safe and sound. Thus, his highly qualified squad must save innocent people's lives and face the most dangerous missions in the world.

== Cast and characters ==
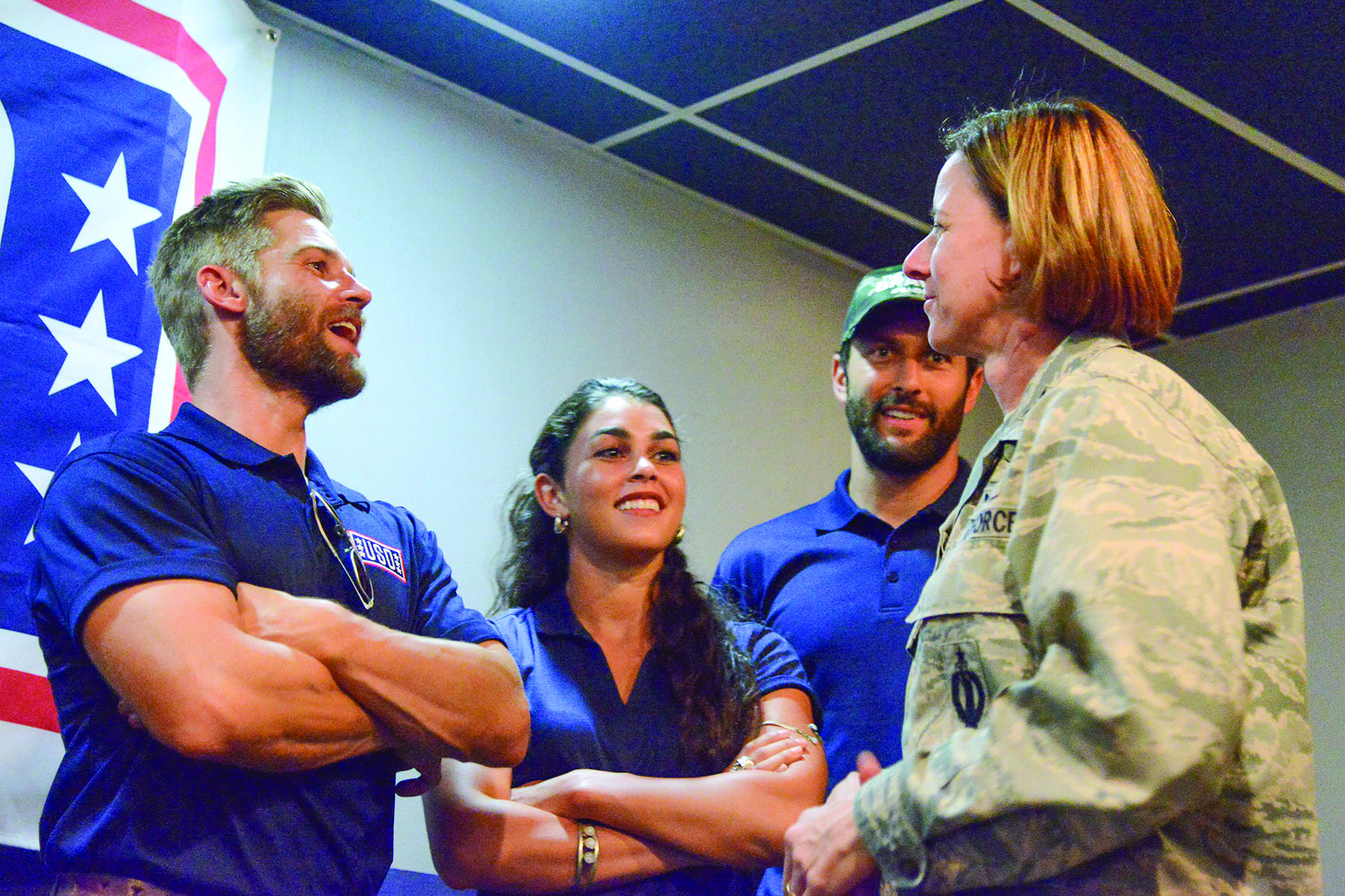
From left, cast members Mike Vogel, Natacha Karam and Noah Mills speak with 377th Air Base Wing Vice Commander Col. Dawn Nickell in 2017

=== Main ===
- Anne Heche as deputy director of the Defense Intelligence Agency Patricia Campbell
- Mike Vogel as Captain Adam "Top" Dalton, a former Delta Force operator, communications director for the team
- Tate Ellington as Noah Morgenthau, an analyst at the DIA and former CIA operative
- Demetrius Grosse as Chief Petty Officer Ezekiel "Preach" Carter, a former U.S. Navy SEAL
- Natacha Karam as Sergeant Jasmine "Jaz" Khan, the team's sniper
- Noah Mills as Sergeant Joseph J. "McG" McGuire, the team's combat medic, a former Delta Force operator
- Sofia Pernas as Hannah Rivera, a former operative turned analyst at the DIA
- Hadi Tabbal as Agent Amir Al-Raisani, intelligence director and newest member of the team

=== Recurring ===
- Bahram Khosraviani as Qassem Javad

== Production ==
NBC ordered the pilot to series on May 4, 2017, together with Rise, making both series the first regular series orders for the 2017–18 United States network television schedule. In May 2017 NBC announced that Matt Corman and Chris Ord would be the series' showrunners.

In a letter published by the 'Renew The Brave' campaign, guest star Naren Weiss wrote about the series as well as his reasoning for taking on one of the series' antagonist roles, stressing the importance of Hadi Tabbal's portrayal and character (Amir Al-Raisani) in terms of the political and entertainment landscapes of the time. Despite this and several other fan campaigns, the series was not renewed for a second season.

== Episodes ==
| No. | Title | Directed by | Written by | Original release date | US viewers (millions) |
|---|---|---|---|---|---|
| 1 | "Pilot" | Brad Anderson | Dean Georgaris | September 25, 2017 | 5.96 |
When Dr. Kimberly Wells, an American ophthalmologist with Doctors Without Borders, is kidnapped by the Al-Nusra Front, a group with terrorist ties in Northern Syria, it is up to Defense Intelligence Agency (DIA) Special Ops Capt. Adam Dalton and his team of heroic Special Ops squad of highly trained undercover specialists to stop at nothing and take action to find the terrorists responsible and bring her home safely. Across the world, D.I.A. Deputy Director Patricia Campbell and her team of analysts guide Dalton along the way through as the group learns that Wells' disappearance might have ties to something that could be catastrophic.
| 2 | "Moscow Rules" | Yves Simoneau | Dean Georgaris | October 2, 2017 | 5.17 |
The team heads to Russia to uncover the truth behind an ambush when a CIA safe house in Ukraine is attacked by rebels and one of the operatives, CIA officer Cassie Connor, is hurt and on the run. The team must locate her while evading the highly skilled Russian ops team in pursuit of her and without starting an international incident. Patricia and her team work to learn why Archer is so important for the rebels to take out and Noah reveals an unexpected connection to the case.
| 3 | "The Greater Good" | Jeffrey Nachmanoff | Story by : Dean Georgaris & Michael Alaimo; Teleplay by : Michael Alaimo | October 9, 2017 | 5.14 |
After receiving intel that a serious, yet extremely cautious and paranoid player in dealing international arms, Rainier Boothe, will be visiting Caborca, Mexico, Patricia makes a controversial decision that could lead to a big breakthrough. With Dalton's team on the ground, they must find a weak link in Boothe's men in order to carry out the mission. The team is tasked with planting a bug on Boothe aided by an undercover Mexican agent and a mole in the terrorist organization – the leader's mistress. Meanwhile, Noah discovers more about Hannah's complicated past from her work in the field.
| 4 | "Break Out" | David Straiton | Mike Daniels | October 16, 2017 | 4.97 |
The team, along with Deputy Director Patricia Campbell, enter an Afghan military prison to interrogate an American traitor who joined the Taliban and has intimate knowledge of an imminent attack on U.S. soil. When the only interrogator who can do the job is brought in to stop the attack, the Taliban prisoners stage an unexpected prison break, and Dalton's team must escape before the heavily armed Taliban reinforcements arrive.
| 5 | "Enhanced Protection" | John Terlesky | Matt Corman & Chris Ord | October 23, 2017 | 5.19 |
The DIA intercepts chatter about an impending attack on a peace summit in Nigeria which will be attended by US Ambassador, Charles Webb. Dalton and his team are assigned to the Ambassador's protection detail. The team head to the region only to find a situation different than they expected. However, the attack ends up being at a mall, and the ambassador's wife is taken hostage. The team rushes to the mall to stop the terrorists before they identify the ambassador's wife, and before they find out the prisoner they want released is already dead. Meanwhile, Campbell receives the letter her son wrote to her in the event of his death, which was just delivered. Jaz makes a connection with a little girl she meets during the mission.
| 6 | "The Seville Defection" | Tessa Blake | Mike Daniels | October 30, 2017 | 4.55 |
While the team is in Spain, a Russian spy's daughter turns to them looking to help her father defect; the team must simultaneously avoid Venezuelan and Russian operatives while Morgenthau enters the field to try and flush out a Russian mole at the NSA. Hannah also ventures out of the office to get some information of her own.
| 7 | "It's All Personal" | Breck Eisner | Jamie Pachino | November 6, 2017 | 5.18 |
When the team heads to Paris on a mission connected to Amir's past, Amir goes undercover assuming an identity as an Algerian ISIS operative, in order to infiltrate a cell in Paris that kidnapped a boy to use him as a suicide bomber. His decisions cause tension for the team as they believe that the boy is a willing participant. With stakes as high as ever, the unit learns more about their newest member and what might have brought him to them.
| 8 | "Stealth" | John Scott | Theo Travers | November 13, 2017 | 5.03 |
An undocumented Russian stealth drone flies over a nomad camp and crashes into a distant mountain. The team is informed that this drone flew over the United States without being detected by RADAR. Their mission lands them in Mongolia where they tend to wounded nomads before heading across the border into China to retrieve a piece of the drone's skin for the NSA to study. They have to evade Russians and Chinese military using old school tactics. Meanwhile, a stunning realization takes place in the D.I.A.
| 9 | "Desperate Times" | Félix Enríquez Alcalá | Denise Harkavy & Dean Georgaris | November 20, 2017 | 4.66 |
After embarking on mission after mission to keep the world safe, the team is confronted with a task that hits close to home. The mission takes them to Iran to eliminate an elusive terrorist responsible for the bombing in Turkey. When things go sideways, the only option is to risk one of their own for their final shot to settle the personal score.
| 10 | "Desperate Measures" | Marisol Adler | Matt Corman & Chris Ord | January 8, 2018 | 2.93 |
Dalton and what remains of his team try to escape with their lives as they process a devastating loss. Meanwhile, in DC, Patricia will stop at nothing to make things right, even if it means putting her career at risk.
| 11 | "Grounded" | Mikael Salomon | Sue Chung | January 15, 2018 | 3.95 |
With Jaz benched after her time as a POW, the rest of the team travels to Colombia to confront a terrorist with a hidden agenda. With Campbell on suspension, Noah is acting Deputy Director. When FARC revolutionaries take control of a flight in Colombia, negotiations mean life or death for the passengers on board and Hannah returns to the field.
| 12 | "Close to Home: Part 1" | David Boyd | Michael Alaimo | January 22, 2018 | 3.40 |
When an unlikely suspect is involved in hacking a U.S. submarine, Dalton and his team stumble upon a piece of Patricia's past. With national security and lives at stake, Patricia heads to Turkey to confront one of her most epic demons.
| 13 | "Close to Home: Part 2" | John Terlesky | Jamie Pachino & Dean Georgaris | January 29, 2018 | 3.90 |
With just four short weeks before Dalton and his team finish their deployment, they continue to race the clock on a high-stakes mission. As they learn more about Hoffman, Patricia and the group attempt to use his intel to save innocent lives, but the information comes at a cost.

== Reception ==
=== Ratings ===
Viewership and ratings per episode of The Brave
| No. | Title | Air date | Rating/share (18–49) | Viewers (millions) | DVR (18–49) | DVR viewers (millions) | Total (18–49) | Total viewers (millions) |
|---|---|---|---|---|---|---|---|---|
| 1 | "Pilot" | September 25, 2017 | 1.3/5 | 5.96 | 0.9 | 3.71 | 2.2 | 9.67 |
| 2 | "Moscow Rules" | October 2, 2017 | 1.1/4 | 5.17 | —N/a | 3.12 | —N/a | 8.29 |
| 3 | "The Greater Good" | October 9, 2017 | 1.1/4 | 5.13 | 0.7 | 3.23 | 1.8 | 8.37 |
| 4 | "Break Out" | October 16, 2017 | 1.0/4 | 4.97 | —N/a | 2.90 | —N/a | 7.87 |
| 5 | "Enhanced Protection" | October 23, 2017 | 1.0/4 | 5.19 | —N/a | 2.86 | —N/a | 8.05 |
| 6 | "The Seville Deduction" | October 30, 2017 | 0.8/3 | 4.55 | 0.7 | 2.85 | 1.5 | 7.40 |
| 7 | "It's All Personal" | November 6, 2017 | 1.0/4 | 5.18 | 0.7 | 2.95 | 1.7 | 8.13 |
| 8 | "Stealth" | November 13, 2017 | 1.0/4 | 5.03 | —N/a | 2.94 | —N/a | 7.96 |
| 9 | "Desperate Times" | November 20, 2017 | 0.9/3 | 4.66 | 0.7 | 2.90 | 1.6 | 7.56 |
| 10 | "Desperate Measures" | January 8, 2018 | 0.5/2 | 2.93 | 0.7 | 3.23 | 1.2 | 6.16 |
| 11 | "Grounded" | January 15, 2018 | 0.7/3 | 3.95 | 0.6 | 2.96 | 1.3 | 6.91 |
| 12 | "Close to Home: Part 1" | January 22, 2018 | 0.7/3 | 3.40 | 0.7 | 3.30 | 1.4 | 6.70 |
| 13 | "Close to Home: Part 2" | January 29, 2018 | 0.7/3 | 3.90 | 0.7 | 2.97 | 1.4 | 6.86 |

=== Critical response ===
The review aggregator website Rotten Tomatoes reported a 42% approval rating, with an average rating of 5.75/10 based on 21 reviews. Metacritic, which uses a weighted average, assigned a score of 54 out of 100 based on 11 critics, indicating "mixed or average reviews".

== See also ==
- SEAL Team (TV series)
- Six (TV series)
