= Zoey's Extraordinary Playlist =

2020 American musical comedy-drama television series

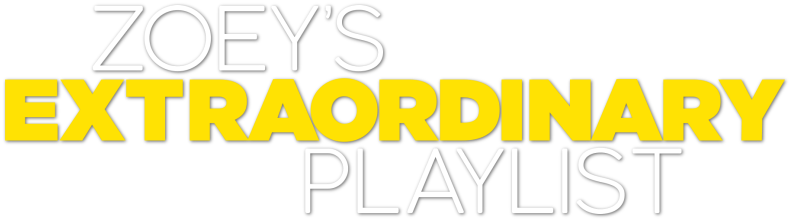
- Genre: Musical; Comedy drama
- Created by: Austin Winsberg
- Starring: Jane Levy; Skylar Astin; Alex Newell; John Clarence Stewart; Peter Gallagher; Mary Steenburgen; Lauren Graham; Andrew Leeds; Alice Lee; Michael Thomas Grant; Kapil Talwalkar
- Music by: Gabriel Mann; Mateo Messina; Craig Wedren; Bo Boddie
- Country of origin: United States
- Original language: English
- No. of seasons: 2
- No. of episodes: 25 + film

Production
- Executive producers: Richard Shepard; Daniel Inkeles; David Blackman; Jessie Henderson; Paul Feig; Eric Tannenbaum; Kim Tannenbaum; Austin Winsberg; Aaron Harberts; Gretchen J. Berg; Adam Davidson; Sam Laybourne; John Terlesky
- Producers: Dan Magnante; Mandy Moore; Michael Cedar; Michele Greco
- Production location: Richmond, British Columbia
- Cinematography: Vanja Cernjul; Shasta Spahn; Vincent De Paula; Mike Spragg
- Editors: David Dean; Annette Davey; John Koslowsky; Katie Abel; Kristi Shimek; Scott Hatcher; Mike Patterson
- Camera setup: Single-camera
- Running time: 43–44 minutes (season 1 and 2); 99 minutes (film)
- Production companies: Zihuatanejo Productions; The Tannenbaum Company; Feigco Entertainment; PolyGram Entertainment; Lionsgate Television; Universal Television

Original release
- Network: NBC
- Release: January 7, 2020 – May 16, 2021

Zoey's Extraordinary Playlist is an American jukebox musical comedy-drama television series created by Austin Winsberg that premiered on January 7, 2020, on NBC. The series stars Jane Levy as Zoey Clarke, a software developer who discovers she has the ability to hear the innermost thoughts of people as songs. Each episode features multiple song-and-dance numbers that develop the storyline, with each cast member singing their own character's songs. Except for the season 2 song "Crimson Love," the soundtrack consists entirely of previously written popular songs. The series also stars Skylar Astin, Alex Newell, John Clarence Stewart, Peter Gallagher, Mary Steenburgen, Lauren Graham, Andrew Leeds, Alice Lee, Michael Thomas Grant and Kapil Talwalkar, and Bernadette Peters. In June 2020, the series was renewed for a second season which premiered on January 5, 2021. In June 2021, the series was canceled after two seasons.

In 2021, streaming service The Roku Channel released an original two-hour holiday film. In addition to songs performed on Zoey's Extraordinary Christmas, the second original song in the series — "North Star", written by Mary Steenburgen, Caitlyn Smith and Troy Verges and sung by Tori Kelly — played during the end credit sequence.

== Cast ==
=== Main ===
- Jane Levy as Zoey Clarke, a programmer who has been recently promoted to engineering manager at San Francisco–based SPRQ Point, a tech firm specializing in smart devices and apps. An earthquake occurs while she is getting an MRI, and a huge playlist of songs on file is downloaded into her brain; she subsequently discovers her mind can now perceive the innermost thoughts of others in the form of popular songs and dance, which she refers to as "heart songs".
- Skylar Astin as Max Richman, Zoey's coworker at SPRQ Point and her closest friend, who has romantic feelings for her. They later become a couple and he inherits her power to hear "heart songs".
- Alex Newell as Mo, Zoey's genderfluid neighbor and a DJ, who tries to help her understand the extent of her power. Mo and Max open a business, a dining concept called "MaxiMo's" where food orders from different apps are coordinated, plated, and served.
- John Clarence Stewart as Simon, a new employee at SPRQ Point who bonds with Zoey over their shared tragic experiences.
- Peter Gallagher as Mitch Clarke (season 1 and film, special guest star season 2), Zoey's father. He has progressive supranuclear palsy, which causes him to lose muscular faculties (based in part on Winsberg's experiences with his own father). Mitch is unable to speak, but he can type short phrases on a computer. Zoey's new gift provides a temporary voice for him to sing out what he's really thinking.
- Mary Steenburgen as Maggie Clarke, Zoey's mother and Mitch's wife. She and Mitch ran a landscape design business prior to his diagnosis.
- Lauren Graham as Joan (season 1, special guest season 2 (Note: Credited as "Special Guest Star" but was a series regular in the first season.)), Zoey's boss at SPRQ Point. She leaves for Singapore and promotes Zoey to her position in the second season.
- Andrew Leeds as David Clarke (season 2 and film; recurring season 1), Zoey's older brother and a public defender.
- Alice Lee as Emily Kang (season 2 and film; recurring season 1), David's wife who is pregnant with their child and is a corporate lawyer.
- Michael Thomas Grant as Leif (season 2 and film; recurring season 1), a coder and professional rival of Zoey, who is part of her engineering team.
- Kapil Talwalkar as Tobin (season 2 and film; recurring season 1), a coder at SPRQ Point and Leif's best friend, who is also part of Zoey's team.

=== Recurring ===
- Stephanie Styles as Autumn (season 1), a barista who briefly dates Max as a result of Zoey's suggestion
- India de Beaufort as Jessica (season 1), Simon's fiancée
- Noah Weisberg as Danny Michael Davis, a mercurial tech billionaire and the founder and CEO of SPRQ Point
- Patrick Ortiz as Eddie (season 1), Mo's new boyfriend and a friend of Jessica
- Zak Orth as Howie (season 1), Mitch's home health aide
- Hiro Kanagawa as Dr. Hamara (season 1), who treats Mitch for his PSP
- Bernadette Peters as Deb, a recently widowed woman who Zoey meets at the funeral home. She later befriends Maggie.
- Harvey Guillén as George (season 2), a new programmer at SPRQ Point
- Jee Young Han as Jenna Kang (season 2), Emily's older sister
- Morgan Taylor Campbell as McKenzie (season 2 and film), a coder at SPRQ Point who is moved into Zoey's team
- Alvina August as Tatiana Morris (season 2), a reporter who befriends Simon
- Felix Mallard as Aiden (season 2), Zoey's neighbor and childhood friend
- Katie Findlay as Rose (season 2), a childhood friend of Max's from camp
- David St. Louis as Perry (season 2 and film), a fire marshal and love interest for Mo

=== Guest ===
- Justin Kirk as Charlie, Joan's high-profile and demanding husband (in "Zoey's Extraordinary Boss")
- Renée Elise Goldsberry as Ava Price, Joan's business rival and ambitious manager on the sixth floor of SPRQ Point (in "Zoey's Extraordinary Silence", "Zoey's Extraordinary Outburst", and "Zoey's Extraordinary Mother")
- Sandra Mae Frank as Abigail, Howie's daughter and an aspiring coder (in "Zoey's Extraordinary Silence"). She is deaf, and Zoey observes her heart-song performed in American Sign Language.
- Chip Zien as Alan, Max's father, a dentist who wants Max to return to New York and join the family business (in "Zoey's Extraordinary Trip")
- Ashlie Atkinson as Nova, a medium Zoey visits (in "Zoey's Extraordinary Mystery")
- Rocco Morris as August, Perry's son (in "Zoey's Extraordinary Mystery", "Zoey's Extraordinary Girls' Night" and film)
- Amarah Taylor as Amirah, Perry's daughter (in "Zoey's Extraordinary Mystery", "Zoey's Extraordinary Girls' Night", "Zoey's Extraordinary Goodbye" and film)
- Oscar Nunez as Dr. Tesoro, Zoey's therapist (in "Zoey's Extraordinary Girls' Night", "Zoey's Extraordinary Double Date", and "Zoey's Extraordinary Session")
- David James Elliott as Jack, the owner of a Christmas tree lot, who attracts Maggie's interest (in "Zoey's Extraordinary Christmas")

== Episodes ==
=== Series overview ===
Season	Episodes	Originally released		
Season	Episodes	First released	Last released	Network
1	12	January 7, 2020	May 3, 2020	NBC
2	13	January 5, 2021	May 16, 2021	NBC
Film		December 1, 2021		The Roku Channel

=== Season 1 (2020) ===
No. overall	No. in season	Title	Directed by	Written by	Original release date	U.S viewers (millions)
1	1	"Pilot" "Zoey's Extraordinary Power"	Richard Shepard	Austin Winsberg	January 7, 2020	2.66
Zoey is dealing with a lot in her life: she is vying for a promotion at work, and her beloved father is slowly dying from a neurological disease. Fearing that she might be developing symptoms herself, she undergoes an MRI. An earthquake during the procedure alters her brain patterns so she can now essentially read minds as people begin "singing" their private thoughts and feelings to her. She uses her power to emotionally connect with a hurting co-worker, Simon, whom she has a crush on, though she later learns that he is engaged. Later, her gift allows her to communicate with her father for the first time in months. Zoey organizes a sailing trip to lift her father's spirits, and takes charge at work in dealing with a system software bug. This impresses her boss, Joan, who agrees to give her the promotion. When she tells some of this to her close friend Max, her gift reveals that he has been secretly in love with her.
2	2	"Zoey's Extraordinary Best Friend"	Adam Davidson	Austin Winsberg	February 16, 2020	2.01
Hoping to draw Max's affections away from her, Zoey sets him up with Autumn, her favorite barista. Her latest project at work, a virtual scavenger hunt designed as part of a company promotion, goes horribly wrong when her overbearing leadership fails to motivate her team. Out of desperation, she finishes the whole project herself, upsetting Joan, who is disappointed at her inability to be an effective manager. At home, Zoey's father sings "Moondance" to her mother. Zoey believes that it is a sign he wants to get intimate. She tells her mother, who is delighted, since her husband, despite gaining more control over his muscle movements thanks to improved medication, is still unable to effectively communicate with her. Zoey takes Simon's advice and tells her team members how much she appreciates them to win their trust. Later, she and Mo discuss her power, and Zoey realizes that she may be able to use it to help people with their problems.
3	3	"Zoey's Extraordinary Boss"	Daisy von Scherler Mayer	Sam Laybourne	February 23, 2020	1.96
Zoey learns that Joan is having issues with her marriage. Initially, she decides not to get involved, but finds herself hounded by Joan's song: "(I Can't Get No) Satisfaction". Zoey opens a dialogue with Joan, who shares about her neglectful, controlling husband Charlie. Zoey also notices her mother, Maggie, is feeling unappreciated at home, constantly caring for Mitch without taking time for herself. After Maggie instigates an altercation at a grocery store, Zoey and her brother stage an intervention and suggest taking turns caring for Mitch. At the launch party where Charlie is scheduled to debut SPRQ's new smartwatch, Joan tells him their marriage is finished. At Zoey's urging, she does the product demo herself, which is well-received. Zoey overcomes her earlier reluctance and joins Simon in a dance.
4	4	"Zoey's Extraordinary Neighbor"	Adam Davidson	Gretchen J. Berg & Aaron Harberts	March 1, 2020	2.06
Zoey discovers that Mo, a choir singer in his spare time, dresses as a man while performing; when she tries to intervene, Mo angrily tells her to stay out of it. Joan becomes depressed and starts fasting, leaving Zoey concerned that her efforts to help others are backfiring. David, noticing that Mitch is upset at the thought of being unable to celebrate the birth of his grandchild, decides to throw a gender-reveal party for him. Maggie is hired to help prepare Simon's wedding, and Zoey confesses to her that her feelings for Simon stem partially from their shared experience of losing fathers. Mo stops attending church, feeling like a hypocrite, but when he sees Zoey help an agoraphobic neighbor leave her apartment for the first time, it inspires him to finally accept who he is and perform dressed as a woman.
5	5	"Zoey's Extraordinary Failure"	Darnell Martin	Jack Kenny & Austin Winsberg	March 8, 2020	1.93
A rift opens between Zoey and her brother when she reveals his fear of fatherhood to his wife Emily, harming their relationship. When she calls him to mend fences, he tells her that they need some time apart before he can forgive her. Max makes the decision to break up with Autumn after realizing that they want different things in life. Leif receives a negative peer review at work and falls into despair as he does not know how to handle criticism, so Zoey lets him blame her for the review (which Joan actually wrote) to help him move past it. Maggie contemplates shutting down the garden design business she founded with Mitch, but changes her mind when Zoey intervenes. That night, Simon comes over to her apartment to share his feelings about the anniversary of his father's death and sings her a heart song, leading to a moment of deep mutual attraction.
6	6	"Zoey's Extraordinary Night Out"	Rose Troche	Lindsey Rosin	March 15, 2020	1.93
Max learns through Zoey that Autumn is furious at him for ending their relationship; he turns to Mo, who advises him to forget the past and gives him a makeover so he can move on. Zoey decides not to attend Simon's engagement party out of fear that his fiancée Jessica believes she and Simon have feelings for each other. Instead, she goes out drinking with Joan, which eventually winds up taking them right to Simon's party. While drunk, Joan and Leif come up with a new tech idea. Mo meets Eddie, one of Jessica's bridesmen. Jessica publicly accuses Zoey of sleeping with her soon-to-be husband, and kicks her out. She then receives a call from Maggie that Mitch has injured his back while going up the stairs. Max steps up, taking Zoey to see her father, and she begins to contemplate whether they might still have a future together.
7	7	"Zoey's Extraordinary Confession"	Richie Keen	Davah Avena	March 22, 2020	1.95
Zoey decides to tell Max the truth about her power. He believes that she is mocking him and his feelings, so she tries to convince him by helping Leif and Tobin fix their friendship, which has been impacted by Leif's new project. Leif admits that he wants to focus more on work, and that he expects Tobin to do the same. Max remains unconvinced, so Zoey then tells him she always knew he loved her but never said anything. This proves to be the last straw, and he walks out. Zoey is torn and she tries to fix things for herself and Max. While Zoey is able to save their relationship by confessing her fears of commitment, Max tells her that it is not enough to fix things. Maggie hires a nurse to care for Mitch, but when she ignores his wishes, Maggie fires her and hires a more laid-back caregiver. Zoey catches Leif and Joan discussing their growing attraction towards each other and start kissing.
8	8	"Zoey's Extraordinary Glitch"	Jon Turteltaub	Samantha McIntyre	March 29, 2020	1.88
While in the midst of extreme stress to meet an impossible schedule at work, and having to make a major presentation to the CEO, Zoey receives devastating news about her father. His condition is beginning to deteriorate rapidly again, and he may have only a few weeks left to live. The extreme stress and sad news cause her power to "reverse", so that rather than hearing other people's most intimate feelings as song, Zoey herself uncontrollably sings her own innermost feelings. Ultimately she breaks into "Pressure" by Billy Joel when she is supposed to be presenting her timeline for a project to the CEO. Zoey and Joan assume they will both be fired as a result of her outburst, but the CEO is impressed by her "weirdness" and not only greenlights the project, but accepts her one year timeline. Zoey also sings out loud to both Simon and Max, revealing that she has feelings for both of them. Simon briefly kisses Zoey, and Zoey faces her father so that her powers can return to normal.
9	9	"Zoey's Extraordinary Silence"	Charles Stone III	Matthew Irving Epstein	April 5, 2020	1.94
Zoey's powers are back to normal, but she wants clarity from Simon about their kiss. She hears Howie, her father's caregiver, sing and discovers that he has a difficult relationship with his daughter, Abigail. Abigail is deaf and pursuing coding, but Howie does not want her to go abroad to Kenya to further her career. Meanwhile, Mo and Eddie have Simon and Jessica over for brunch so Mo can "read Simon the riot act" about what he is doing to Jessica and Zoey, but it becomes clear that Simon is a good person who just does not know what to do. Emily receives advice from Maggie about how to let her husband know that she wants to have sex again. Max receives a job offer from Ava Price on Floor 6, which he accepts with Zoey's approval. Zoey and Tobin talk to Abigail about her relationship with Howie and about a potential internship at SPRQ Point; ultimately Zoey helps convince Howie to let Abigail study abroad. Zoey conveys to Simon that she "can't and won't do this anymore." When Zoey returns to work the next day, she witnesses Simon and Jessica (presumably) break up.
10	10	"Zoey's Extraordinary Outburst"	Tristram Shapeero	Adam Armus	April 19, 2020	1.98
Max grows accustomed to his new job on the sixth floor, even deciding to stay and help his new team work on the fourth floor's project when they went up to take him back. Zoey thinks that he is torturing her for not supporting him; Max retorts that he wants to focus on his own happiness now rather than everyone else's. Zoey then blows up at Howie for sedating her father so he could sleep better, the drawback being that he is less responsive, and to Zoey, is one less moment to bond with him. Following a dispute with Simon over his grief and a cathartic dance party orchestrated by Mo, both Simon and Zoey help each other to acknowledge their own griefs. Joan breaks off her relationship with Leif, who copes by asking Max if he could move to the sixth floor with him. The day of Mitch and Maggie's anniversary, Zoey and Howie craft an intimate dinner for them so they can share one last romantic night together.
11	11	"Zoey's Extraordinary Mother"	Adam Davidson	Gretchen J. Berg & Aaron Harberts & Sam Laybourne	April 26, 2020	1.70
Zoey and family begin preparations for the funeral, but Maggie especially is not ready for any of it or what follows emotionally. A well-off widow named Deb is encountered by Zoey. She enlists Deb to help Maggie acknowledge the inevitability of her husband being gone. When Joan notices Zoey is unable to hold her own during the floor competition, she assures her to not let work get in the way of family and to take her time in the later transition. Max and Leif unexpectedly bond over their rejected love for Zoey and Joan, respectively. Mo wants to break up with his boyfriend when he announces the possibility of an eight-month commitment for a show; despite his heart-singing otherwise, Mo ends it. Joan and Ava learn that Leif has been transferring data for the big project to the fourth floor; they respond by calling the competition off and agreeing to start working together. This inspires Zoey and Max to begin mending their friendship. However, Ava confronts Max for his decision of allowing Leif to join the sixth floor, and fires him on the spot.
12	12	"Zoey's Extraordinary Dad"	Jon Turteltaub & Adam Davidson	Austin Winsberg	May 3, 2020	1.98
Zoey hears herself singing "Bad Moon Rising", which unsettles her, so she is waiting for the worst to happen. What is more, Zoey is going to make a huge decision about her feelings and share them with Max and Simon. Mitch's condition is not going well and the family is preparing to go through the worst possible scenario. At the end, Zoey and her family and friends attend Zoey's father's funeral and say goodbye (closing the season) with the lengthy heart song "American Pie".

=== Season 2 (2021) ===
No. overall	No. in season	Title	Directed by	Written by	Original release date	U.S viewers (millions)
13	1	"Zoey's Extraordinary Return"	John Terlesky	Austin Winsberg	January 5, 2021	3.01
After Mitch's death, Zoey has been staying with Maggie; she returns to work six weeks later and is upset over how things have changed. Zoey meets her new colleague George, and Joan offers her the job of executive of the fourth floor. Max struggles to find inspiration for his new company and stumbles upon the idea of creating a restaurant that orders food from other restaurants. Maggie struggles with Mitch's passing. David and Emily adjust to being new parents, and Maggie confesses to Zoey she feels bad about not holding Miles because she and Mitch were supposed to be grandparents together. Later, Zoey and Max kiss.
14	2	"Zoey's Extraordinary Distraction"	Anya Adams	Sam Laybourne	January 12, 2021	2.66
Zoey and Max finally get together, but their attempts at spending private time are continually thwarted by Mo and work problems. The SPRQ Point watch is malfunctioning, and Zoey's team is tasked with coming up with a fix. Max and Mo decide to go into business together, but Mo is reluctant to sign a partnership agreement. Emily's sister Jenna comes to town and is a handful.
15	3	"Zoey's Extraordinary Dreams"	John Terlesky	Samantha McIntyre	January 19, 2021	2.41
Zoey has a recurring nightmare where she sings "Nowhere to Run" in her mom's empty house. Max suggests it may be time for Zoey to move home, but she doesn't want to leave Maggie in the lurch. Zoey and Max decide it may be a good thing to press pause on their relationship. Feeling stuck, Jenna helps Maggie find her creative spark again. David and Emily look forward to Jenna leaving but are disappointed upon learning she'll be sticking around to help Maggie with the new project while Max and Mo look at spaces for their new business.
16	4	"Zoey's Extraordinary Employee"	Anya Adams	Robert Sudduth	January 26, 2021	2.31
Zoey decides to "choose happiness" but is thrown upon learning she has to fire 10 percent of the fourth floor, including one of her favorite employees. Simon, as the new company spokesman, is interviewed by Tatiana, a female reporter. Maggie's new landscaping client, Roger, flirts with her and asks her out, but Maggie feels it's too soon to date after Mitch's death, and Jenna reminds Maggie that it's okay to want to be wanted. Max feels Mo isn't pulling his weight, something which is intensified when Mo holds a karaoke cleansing. Later, Mo and Max set aside their differences and make up. Zoey discovers her childhood friend, Aiden, just moved back into the neighborhood.
17	5	"Zoey's Extraordinary Trip"	John Terlesky	Joe Port & Joe Wiseman	February 2, 2021	2.24
Zoey takes the advice of Aiden and takes a day off, doing drugs. Danny, who just got released from his house arrest, joins them. Meanwhile, Max and Mo struggle to attract investors for their restaurant which forces Max to seek help from his rich father. Max's father provides him the money but does not believe his restaurant would work. Max refuses the aid. Roger lashes out at Maggie after she refused to date him. Jenna vandalizes his car as an act of revenge but Maggie both leaves Roger's project and fires Jenna, upsetting her. Later, they make up and Jenna leaves for home. Simon realizes that his new designation is only a facade for the lack of racial diversity in the company. Disappointed, Simon blows up the company's cover.
18	6	"Zoey's Extraordinary Reckoning"	Anya Adams	Zora Bikangaga	February 9, 2021	2.19
After Simon reveals the company's truth, Danny forces Zoey to talk him into retracting his statement. She confronts Simon who refuses to draw back. She also discovers that Tobin faces racial comments on his Indian ethnicity and tries to encourage him to support Simon but he initially declines. Simon decides to quit his job, on which Zoey supports him. But when Zoey and Simon find out that Tobin opened up about his experiences and started a hashtag on the internet, and that people have opened up from several branches of the company worldwide, Simon inspires the board to bring a change in the workplace culture, that leads to ultimate success. Meanwhile, Max and Mo succeed in securing funds from Danny.
19	7	"Zoey's Extraordinary Memory"	John Terlesky	Emily Fox	March 28, 2021	1.20
Zoey wants to recreate a memory with her father on the occasion of an astrological event. Her evening is ruined by Leif, in the pains of love. Mo and Max open the MaxiMo which seems to have a great success. The episode ends with Zoey realizing that the important thing is not the event itself but the people she shares it with.
20	8	"Zoey's Extraordinary Birthday"	Shasta Spahn	Lindsey Rosin	April 4, 2021	1.18
It's Zoey's 30th birthday, and she's throwing a big party, though there's no shortage of challenges, to honor Mitch's celebratory spirit. Everyone seems to have a lover (Mo and Perry, Max and Rose, Mackenzie and Tobin, Emily and David) and Zoey is sad that she's getting her crush on Simon again. Aiden plays a song with his band (with David) in which he expresses his love for Zoey, who turns him down. The episode ends positively with Zoey and Simon starting a relationship. David leaves the band.
21	9	"Zoey's Extraordinary Mystery"	John Terlesky	Samantha McIntyre	April 11, 2021	1.43
Zoey consults a medium to contact her father, on Mo's advice, although she isn't very convinced. The session glitches Zoey's powers, and people's "heart songs" become switched. Zoey begins a frantic race to figure out who switched with Max, as Max sang an overwhelmingly sad song at MaxiMo. Her efforts lead her to realize that Maggie is feeling lonely, Rose doesn't know how to tell Max that she's a recovering alcoholic, Mo is worried about her relationship with Perry, and Simon feels that Zoe doesn't let him in emotionally. Finally, after another talk with the medium makes her realize that she's been relying on her powers instead of actually paying attention to people, Zoey realizes that Emily is suffering postpartum depression when she sings Max's heart song.
22	10	"Zoey's Extraordinary Girls' Night"	Richard Lewis	Alicia Carroll	April 18, 2021	1.20
Zoey desperately tries to help Emily, who constantly resists. Meanwhile, Deb tries to help Maggie get back into social life by taking her to the casino. Also, Mo, Max, and Simon deal with love issues: the former fails to connect with Perry's paternity; Max is afraid that when Rose leaves, she might leave him; and Simon feels excluded from Zoey's secrets, who has not yet confessed to having powers. Ultimately, Emily admits that she needs help to Zoey and, later, to David. Zoey goes to a psychologist, to whom she has disclosed her powers.
23	11	"Zoey's Extraordinary Double Date"	Mandy Moore	Emily Fox & Robert Sudduth	May 2, 2021	1.30
Zoey decides, with the help of her new therapist, to dedicate an entire weekend to Simon. Together they participate in a race with Max and Rose. Everyone is excited except Zoey and Max. At the end of the race, they find themselves at MaxiMo where Mo is meeting Perry's ex-husband. Zoey promised to help the man with the date, but she just ruins things. Furthermore, Max alludes to the fact that he has decided to move to New York with Rose, which makes Zoey sad. Meanwhile, Deb worries about Maggie, who appears to have developed a gambling addiction. On the contrary, she was trying to get rid of the money earned from her last job, but instead of getting rid of it, she earns more and more by continuing to win. With that money, she decides to go on vacation with Deb.
24	12	"Zoey's Extraordinary Session"	Richard J. Lewis	Celeste Klaus & Sam Laybourne	May 9, 2021	1.31
In a session with her new therapist, Zoey looks back on the first day at SPRQ Point. Mitch calls Zoey saying Maggie and he are heading to the hospital after Maggie experienced a hard time breathing. After the call, Zoey and Max team up as they have to complete three challenges set by Danny. After finishing the first two tasks and being placed second, Zoey gets a call from Mitch saying Maggie is in the hospital and she had a mini-heart attack. Zoey leaves SPRQ Point and gets a car, driven by Mo, to head to the hospital. During the drive, Max and Zoey find a way to finish the last challenge. When Zoey arrives at the hospital, she and Mitch (with David and his girlfriend) head to the room to check on Maggie. After a few moments, Mitch and Maggie sing a duet about how they can get through. Max comes to visit Zoey, telling her she got a job at SPRQ Point along with Leif. But actually, Max got the job and he demanded to Danny that Zoey should get the job because she's better at coding than he is.
25	13	"Zoey's Extraordinary Goodbye"	John Terlesky	Austin Winsberg	May 16, 2021	1.28
Zoey and Simon break up. Perry expresses his interest in getting back together with Mo, who is reluctant at first. Zoey learns the truth about how Max surrendered his spot at SPRQ Point for her, which upsets her. The two fight and Max confesses that he did it because he knew how much working at SPRQ Point meant to Zoey. Danny confronts another tech company whose employees are people of color. After Simon and Danny converse about this, the latter offers the former the opportunity of working in SPRQ Point's incubation program. Maggie reconnects with an old crush. Maggie later announces that she is reentering the dating game after learning that her old crush is married. Zoey reconnects with Mitch via a dream and realizes that she avoids feeling high emotions out of fear of loss and hurt. She goes to the airport with Mo to confess her feelings to Max, but retreats after hearing his heart song for Rose. Max surprises her by the Golden Bridge and says that he and Rose broke up at the airport since it is obvious that Max still loves Zoey. Zoey confesses her feelings to Max via a heart song, which he actually hears, much to their mutual astonishment.

=== Zoey's Extraordinary Christmas Film (2021) ===
No.	Title	Directed by	Written by	Original release date
26	"Zoey's Extraordinary Christmas"	Richard Shepard	Story by : Austin Winsberg and Sam Laybourne and Samantha McIntyre; Teleplay by : Austin Winsberg	December 1, 2021
Having shared Zoey's powers for two weeks, Max thinks using them to help people is easy. Zoey considers how to spend her first Christmas without her father. David and Maggie both plan vacations away from San Francisco, and Max is surprised that Zoey gives her blessing after singing a resentful heart song. Zoey's coworkers downplay their holiday plans, but a heart song reveals they are all thrilled to spend time with family. After Max suggests they also leave town, Zoey admits she wants to preserve Mitch's traditions at home instead. So, she persuades her family to agree. When a heart song reveals Maggie's attraction to tree-lot owner Jack, Zoey discusses it with Maggie, who feels unready to date. However, Max invites Jack to Christmas dinner by surprise. Maggie and Jack share a kiss under the mistletoe, shocking Zoey. After Jack accidentally breaks a snowglobe Mitch treasured, the family's sad heart song leaves Max in tears. A dream of Mitch tells Zoey that he will always be with her, even if she creates new holiday traditions and allows her life to change. Max apologizes for never considering the burden presented by Zoey's powers. She concludes that he received the powers in order to experience that empathy, and he suggests she got them so she would engage with the world. They share a heart song, but then Max becomes unable to hear it anymore. They both decide they are at peace with this. At Mitch's grave, Maggie decides to find herself before dating again. A law school rival's gloating Christmas newsletter irks David and Emily. So, they create a fake newsletter of their own to send in reply. After Zoey questions their motives, Emily is touched when David writes a letter authentically sharing the challenges of the previous year. They then agree to send the fake one. Simon visits his mother and new stepfather in Las Vegas, and gives Zoey a souvenir snowglobe. Perry encourages Mo to become involved in his children's lives. But after he makes himself the star of Amirah's holiday pageant, Perry explains that it was meant to be a chance for the children to shine. So, Mo gives Amirah the first performance slot at his "Christmas Carol-oke" event at MaxiMo's, which the Clarke family attends. Later on, Max apologizes to Zoey for not understanding the burden the powers put on her. His newfound empathy had resulted in his losing the powers, in response to which Zoey says that if he wants to know what she is thinking or feeling, he can just ask her about it.

== Production ==
=== Development ===
On January 12, 2019, the production officially received a pilot order. The pilot was written by Austin Winsberg who executive produces alongside Richard Shepard, Paul Feig, Kim Tannenbaum, Eric Tannenbaum, David Blackman and Daniel Inkeles. Production companies involved with the pilot include Lionsgate Television and Universal Television. On May 12, 2019, it was announced that the production had been given a series order. A few days later, it was announced that the series would premiere as a mid-season replacement in the mid-season of 2020. The series premiered as a special preview on January 7, and moved to its regular time-slot on February 16, 2020. On June 11, 2020, NBC renewed the series for a second season, following significant gains among digital viewership and strong fan support in USA Today's annual Save Our Shows poll. The second season premiered on January 5, 2021. On June 9, 2021, NBC canceled the series after two seasons, but was expected to shop to other networks. On August 5, 2021, it was announced that streaming service The Roku Channel was nearing a deal for a two-hour wrap-up movie, with potential of leading to more episodes. TVLine reported on September 8, 2021, that the movie — Zoey's Extraordinary Christmas — was scheduled to begin production in Vancouver within the month. An excerpt of the movie was posted to YouTube on November 1, 2021, promoting a full release of the movie on December 1, 2021.

=== Casting ===
In February 2019, it was announced that Jane Levy, Skylar Astin, Alex Newell and Mary Steenburgen had been cast in the pilot's leading roles. The pilot was ordered. In March 2019 it was reported that Peter Gallagher, John Clarence Stewart and Carmen Cusack had joined the cast. On May 23, 2019, Andrew Leeds was cast as David in a recurring role. On August 27, 2019, it was announced that Lauren Graham had replaced Cusack in the role of Joan. On September 6, 2019, Michael Thomas Grant, Kapil Talwalkar and Stephanie Styles were cast in recurring capacities. In September 2020, it was announced that Kapil Talwalkar, Andrew Leeds, Alice Lee, and Michael Thomas Grant had been promoted to series regulars while Harvey Guillén was cast in a recurring role for the second season. On October 29, 2020, Jee Young Han and Felix Mallard were cast in recurring roles for the second season.

Graham's character was written out in the second season as moving to Singapore, since Graham was busy filming The Mighty Ducks: Game Changers. On March 18, 2021, Katie Findlay joined the cast in a recurring role for the second season.

=== Filming ===
Principal photography for the first season began on September 3, 2019, and ended on January 30, 2020, in Richmond, British Columbia. The closing credits note that the pilot was partially filmed in San Francisco, with a number of open air musical productions shot on the downtown streets of The Embarcadero and North Beach. Mandy Moore serves as a producer and the choreographer for the series.

Filming for the second season began on September 21, 2020, and concluded on March 26, 2021. The American Pie scene in the series finale was filmed in one long take.

Filming for Zoey's Extraordinary Christmas ran from September 15, 2021, to October 8, 2021.

== Broadcast ==
Zoey's Extraordinary Playlist premiered on Tuesday, January 7, 2020, in the 10:00 p.m. (EDT) hour. The series returned on Sunday, February 16, 2020, at 9:00 p.m. and maintained that timeslot for the remainder of the first season. The second season premiered on Tuesday, January 5, 2021, at 8:00 p.m. EDT. Zoey's Extraordinary Playlist went on hiatus on February 9, 2021, and was replaced by Young Rock and Kenan. The series returned to its original timeslot on Sunday, March 28, 2021.

In the United Kingdom, the series was picked up by Channel 4 for broadcast on their E4 channel, though after a few episodes of season 2 the show was moved, at short notice, out of primetime to around 2:00am, being replaced by a repeat of Naked Attraction. In addition to E4, Channel 4 have also re-run season 1 on their 4Music channel.

In Australia, the series premiered on streaming service Stan on February 17, 2020 with each episode being released the week after its US premiere.

== List of songs performed on the show ==
This is a list of songs that have been performed on the show. The series features "musical performances that explore the innermost feelings of its characters" as they "break out into song and (sometimes) dance". Mae Abdulbaki of Cinemablend, said the show "cleverly tackles pent-up emotions and storylines through song". The seven-minute finale song for the first season – a performance of "American Pie" – featured all the lead actors, singing individually or in harmony, filmed in a one-shot, after the funeral for Zoey's father.

=== Season 1 ===
Episode	Song	Performer(s)
1.1	"Angel of the Morning" by Juice Newton	Alex Newell as Mo
1.1	"Wake Me Up Before You Go-Go" by Wham!	Alex Newell as Mo
1.1	"All by Myself" by Eric Carmen	Malinda Farrington as Lonely Woman
1.1	"Whatta Man" by Salt-N-Pepa	Connie Chen, Karriyma Pekary, and Carolyn Fluehr as Three Ogling Women
1.1	"Help!" by The Beatles	Various as Crowd
1.1	"Lean on Me" by Bill Withers	Alex Newell as Mo
1.1	"Morning Has Broken" by Eleanor Farjeon	Alex Newell as Mo
1.1	"Mad World" by Michael Andrews featuring Gary Jules	John Clarence Stewart as Simon
1.1	"All I Do Is Win" by DJ Khaled	Michael Thomas Grant as Leif
1.1	"True Colors" by Cyndi Lauper	Peter Gallagher as Mitch
1.1	"Good Morning" by Gene Kelly, Debbie Reynolds, Donald O'Connor	Alex Newell as Mo
1.1	"I Think I Love You" by The Partridge Family	Skylar Astin as Max
1.2	"I've Got the Music in Me" by Kiki Dee	Jane Levy as Zoey
1.2	"Sucker" by Jonas Brothers	Skylar Astin as Max
1.2	"I Wanna Dance with Somebody (Who Loves Me)" by Whitney Houston	Various as Crowd
1.2	"Moondance" by Van Morrison	Peter Gallagher as Mitch
1.3	"(I Can't Get No) Satisfaction" by The Rolling Stones	Lauren Graham as Joan
1.3	"How Can You Mend a Broken Heart" by The Bee Gees	Mary Steenburgen as Maggie
1.3	"Superstar" from Jesus Christ Superstar	Michael Thomas Grant, Kapil Talwalkar, various as Coders
1.3	"NO" by Meghan Trainor	John Clarence Stewart as Simon
1.3	"Roar" by Katy Perry	Lauren Graham as Joan
1.4	"Great Pretender" by The Platters	Alex Newell as Mo
1.4	"Con te partirò" by Andrea Bocelli	Skylar Astin as Max
1.4	"Margaritaville" by Jimmy Buffett	Naoko Mori as Bonnie
1.4	"Kokomo" by The Beach Boys	Naoko Mori as Bonnie
1.4	"Wrecking Ball" by Miley Cyrus	Lauren Graham as Joan
1.4	"This Little Light of Mine" by Harry Dixon Loes	Alex Newell as Mo
1.5	"Just Give Me a Reason" by P!nk (ft. Nate Ruess)	Andrew Leeds as David and Alice Lee as Emily
1.5	"(You Gotta) Fight for Your Right (to Party!)" by The Beastie Boys	Andrew Leeds as David
1.5	"Everybody Hurts" by R.E.M.	Michael Thomas Grant as Leif
1.5	"It's Your Thing" by The Isley Brothers	Peter Gallagher as Mitch
1.5	"Should I Stay or Should I Go" by The Clash	John Clarence Stewart as Simon
1.6	"You Give Love a Bad Name" by Bon Jovi	Stephanie Styles as Autumn
1.6	"Tik Tok" by Ke$ha	Lauren Graham as Joan
1.6	"Say My Name" by Destiny's Child	India de Beaufort as Jessica
1.6	"I'm Gonna Be (500 Miles)" by The Proclaimers	Skylar Astin as Max
1.7	"A Little Less Conversation" by Elvis Presley	Mary Steenburgen as Maggie
1.7	"If I Can't Have You" by Shawn Mendes	Skylar Astin as Max
1.7	"Don't Speak" by No Doubt	Kapil Talwalkar as Tobin
1.7	"Bailamos" by Enrique Inglesias	Alex Newell as Mo and Patrick Ortiz as Eddie
1.7	"I Put a Spell on You" by Screamin' Jay Hawkins	Michael Thomas Grant as Leif
1.8	"Crazy" by Gnarls Barkley	Jane Levy as Zoey
1.8	"I Saw Mommy Kissing Santa Claus" by Jimmy Boyd	Jane Levy as Zoey
1.8	"Pressure" by Billy Joel	Jane Levy as Zoey and Skylar Astin as Max
1.8	"I'm Yours" by Jason Mraz	Jane Levy as Zoey
1.8	"I Want You to Want Me" by Cheap Trick	Jane Levy as Zoey
1.8	"How Do I Live?" by LeAnn Rimes	Jane Levy as Zoey
1.9	"The Sound of Silence" by Simon & Garfunkel	Zak Orth as Howie and Peter Gallagher as Mitch
1.9	"Buttons" by The Pussycat Dolls	Alice Lee as Emily
1.9	"Fight Song" by Rachel Platten	Sandra Mae Frank as Abigail
1.9	"The Trouble with Love Is" by Kelly Clarkson	Alex Newell as Mo
1.9	"Happier" by Marshmello (ft. Bastille)	John Clarence Stewart as Simon and India de Beaufort as Jessica
1.10	"Here I Go Again" by Whitesnake	Skylar Astin as Max and John Clarence Stewart as Simon
1.10	"Let's Stay Together" by Al Green	Michael Thomas Grant as Leif
1.10	"Mad World" by Michael Andrews featuring Gary Jules	John Clarence Stewart as Simon
1.10	"The Boy Is Mine" by Brandy & Monica	Lauren Graham as Joan and Renée Elise Goldsberry as Ava
1.10	"Perfect" by Ed Sheeran	Mary Steenburgen as Maggie and Peter Gallagher as Mitch
1.11	"We Gotta Get Out of This Place" by The Animals	Mary Steenburgen as Maggie, Andrew Leeds as David, various as crowd
1.11	"Feeling Good" by Nina Simone	Bernadette Peters as Deb
1.11	"All Out of Love" by Air Supply/ "Bye Bye Bye" by *NSYNC	Michael Thomas Grant as Leif & Skylar Astin as Max
1.11	"Issues" by Julia Michaels	Alex Newell as Mo
1.11	"Get Together" by The Youngbloods	Lauren Graham as Joan and Renée Elise Goldsberry as Ava
1.12	"Bad Moon Rising" by Creedence Clearwater Revival	Jane Levy as Zoey
1.12	"Jealous" by Nick Jonas	John Clarence Stewart as Simon
1.12	"I Will Follow Him" by Peggy March	Alex Newell as Mo
1.12	"All of Me" by John Legend	Skylar Astin as Max
1.12	"I Know You Want Me (Calle Ocho)" by Pitbull	Skylar Astin as Max
1.12	"Lullaby (Goodnight My Angel)" by Billy Joel	Peter Gallagher as Mitch and Andrew Leeds as David
1.12	"Dream a Little Dream of Me"	Mary Steenburgen as Maggie
1.12	"American Pie" by Don McLean	Various as Crowd

=== Season 2 ===
Episode	Song	Performer(s)
2.1	"Rise Up" by Andra Day	Alex Newell as Mo
2.1	"Hello, Dolly!" from Hello Dolly!	Various
2.1	"Are You Gonna Be My Girl" by Jet	Skylar Astin as Max and John Clarence Stewart as Simon
2.1	"Don't Cry Out Loud" by Melissa Manchester	Harvey Guillén as George
2.1	"Carry On" by fun.	Mary Steenburgen as Maggie, Alice Lee as Emily, and Andrew Leeds as David
2.2	"Poison" by Bell Biv DeVoe	Alice Lee as Emily
2.2	"Too Good at Goodbyes" by Sam Smith	Alex Newell as Mo
2.2	"Baby Did a Bad Bad Thing" by Chris Isaak	Michael Thomas Grant as Leif
2.2	"Take Me Out to the Ball Game", music by Albert Von Tilzer, lyrics by Jack Norworth	Skylar Astin as Max
2.2	"I'll Make Love to You" by Boyz II Men	Skylar Astin as Max
2.2	"A Moment Like This" by Kelly Clarkson	Skylar Astin as Max and Jane Levy as Zoey
2.3	"Nowhere to Run" by Martha Reeves and the Vandellas	Jane Levy as Zoey
2.3	"Someone You Loved" by Lewis Capaldi	Mary Steenburgen as Maggie
2.3	"One Call Away" by Charlie Puth	Jee Young Han as Jenna
2.3	"It's the Hard-Knock Life" from Annie	Michael Thomas Grant as Leif, Kapil Talwalkar as Tobin, and Harvey Guillén as George
2.3	"Say Something" by A Great Big World and Christina Aguilera	Skylar Astin as Max
2.4	"I Want to Break Free" by Queen	Andrew Leeds as David
2.4	"Juice" by Lizzo	John Clarence Stewart as Simon
2.4	"Opposites Attract" by Paula Abdul	Alex Newell as Mo and Skylar Astin as Max
2.4	"Stronger" by Britney Spears	Harvey Guillén as George
2.4	"I'll Stand by You" by The Pretenders	Alice Lee as Emily
2.4	"Sex and Candy" by Marcy Playground	Felix Mallard as Aiden
2.5	"Unwritten" by Natasha Bedingfield	Felix Mallard as Aiden
2.5	"Starships" by Nicki Minaj	Jane Levy as Zoey, Felix Mallard as Aiden, Noah Weisberg as Danny, Various as Crowd
2.5	"Numb" by Linkin Park	Skylar Astin as Max
2.5	"Don't Let Me Be Misunderstood" by Nina Simone	John Clarence Stewart as Simon
2.6	"Black Man in a White World" by Michael Kiwanuka	John Clarence Stewart as Simon
2.6	"No More Drama" by Mary J. Blige	Alex Newell as Mo
2.6	"The Tracks of My Tears" by The Miracles	Kapil Talwalkar as Tobin
2.6	"Tightrope" by Janelle Monáe	John Clarence Stewart as Simon, Alex Newell as Mo, Alvina August as Tatiana
2.7	"Drift Away" by Dobie Gray	Andrew Leeds as David
2.7	"Tainted Love" by Gloria Jones	Michael Thomas Grant as Leif
2.7	"Let's Get Loud" by Jennifer Lopez	Alex Newell as Mo and Skylar Astin as Max
2.7	"Watermelon Sugar" by Harry Styles	Felix Mallard as Aiden
2.8	"Need You Tonight" by INXS	Skylar Astin as Max and Katie Findlay as Rose
2.8	"Don't Leave Me This Way" by Thelma Houston	John Clarence Stewart as Simon, Kapil Talwalkar as Tobin, Morgan Taylor Campbell as McKenzie, Various as Coders
2.8	"Kiss Me" by Sixpence None the Richer	Alex Newell as Mo, David St. Louis as Perry, Alice Lee as Emily, Andrew Leeds as David, Morgan Taylor Campbell as McKenzie, Alvina August as Tatiana, Various as Crowd
2.8	"Crimson Love" (original song)	Felix Mallard as Aiden and Andrew Leeds as David
2.8	"Into You" by Ariana Grande	John Clarence Stewart as Simon
2.9	"Anyone" by Demi Lovato	Skylar Astin as Max
2.9	"One" by Harry Nilsson	Kapil Talwalkar as Tobin, Morgan Taylor Campbell as McKenzie, Michael Thomas Grant as Leif, Various as Coders
2.9	"Anything You Can Do (I Can Do Better)" by Irving Berlin	Mary Steenburgen as Maggie
2.9	"The More I Drink" by Blake Shelton	Alex Newell as Mo
2.9	"The Fox (What Does the Fox Say?)" by Ylvis	John Clarence Stewart as Simon
2.9	"IDGAF" by Dua Lipa	Katie Findlay as Rose
2.9	"Love on the Brain" by Rihanna	Rocco Morris as August
2.9	"Rosanna" by Toto	Alice Lee as Emily
2.9	"Anyone" by Demi Lovato	Alice Lee as Emily
2.10	"Make You Feel My Love" by Bob Dylan	Andrew Leeds as David
2.10	"Cheap Thrills" by Sia	Bernadette Peters as Deb
2.10	"Tearin' Up My Heart" by NSYNC	John Clarence Stewart as Simon, Alex Newell as Mo, and Skylar Astin as Max
2.10	"Gasoline" by Halsey	Alice Lee as Emily
2.10	"I Look to You" by Whitney Houston	Alex Newell as Mo, Various as Choir
2.11	"Overwhelmed" by Royal & the Serpent	Noah Galvin and Becca Tobin as Therapy Patients
2.11	"Unwell" by Matchbox Twenty	David St. Louis as Perry
2.11	"Don't Stop Me Now" by Queen	John Clarence Stewart as Simon, Katie Findlay as Rose, Various as Crowd
2.11	"New York State of Mind" by Billy Joel	Skylar Astin as Max
2.11	"Suspicious Minds" by Mark James	John Clarence Stewart as Simon
2.11	"Rich Girl" by Gwen Stefani featuring Eve	Bernadette Peters as Deb and Mary Steenburgen as Maggie
2.12	"Pure Imagination" by Gene Wilder	Noah Weisberg as Danny Michael Davis
2.12	"The Climb" by Miley Cyrus	SPRQ Point Employee
2.12	"Thinking Out Loud" by Ed Sheeran	Skylar Astin as Max and Michael Thomas Grant as Leif
2.12	"Shut Up and Drive" by Rihanna	Alex Newell as Mo
2.12	"Dream a Little Dream of Me"	Peter Gallagher as Mitch and Mary Steenburgen as Maggie
2.13	"Sing" by Joe Raposo	Various as Crowd
2.13	"Shake It Off" by Taylor Swift	Various as Crowd
2.13	"We Can Work It Out" by The Beatles	Alex Newell as Mo and David St. Louis as Perry
2.13	"I Lived" by OneRepublic	Peter Gallagher as Mitch
2.13	"When a Man Loves a Woman" by Percy Sledge	Skylar Astin as Max
2.13	"I'm Still Standing" by Elton John	John Clarence Stewart as Simon
2.13	"I Melt with You" by Modern English	Jane Levy as Zoey

=== Film ===
Song	Performer(s)
"It's the Most Wonderful Time of the Year" by Andy Williams	Alex Newell as Mo
"Bad Blood" by Taylor Swift	Jane Levy as Zoey
"Home Sweet Home" by Mötley Crüe	Michael Thomas Grant as Leif, Kapil Talwalkar as Tobin, Morgan Taylor Campbell as McKenzie, Various as Crowd
"Just the Two of Us" by Grover Washington Jr. & Bill Withers	Skylar Astin as Max
"We Need A Little Christmas" by Jerry Herman	Jane Levy as Zoey
"Mele Kalikimaka" by Bing Crosby & The Andrews Sisters	Bernadette Peters as Deb
"Call Me Maybe" by Carly Rae Jepsen	Mary Steenburgen as Maggie
"Underneath the Tree" by Kelly Clarkson	Alex Newell as Mo
"Wish You Were Here" by Pink Floyd	Jane Levy as Zoey, Andrew Leeds as David, Alice Lee as Emily and Mary Steenburgen as Maggie
"Have Yourself A Merry Little Christmas" by Judy Garland	Peter Gallagher as Mitch
"Time After Time" by Cyndi Lauper	Jane Levy as Zoey and Skylar Astin as Max
"What Christmas Means to Me" by Stevie Wonder	Amarah Taylor as Amirah and David St. Louis as Perry

== Reception ==
=== Critical response ===
The review aggregator website Rotten Tomatoes reported a 76% approval rating with an average rating of 7.18/10, based on 34 reviews for the first season. The website's critical consensus states, "Though it hits the occasional sour note, Zoey's Extraordinary Playlist manages to carry a pretty enjoyable tune, thanks in large part to the always charming Jane Levy." On Metacritic, it has a weighted average score of 66 out of 100, based on 18 critics, indicating "generally favorable reviews". Mae Abdulbaki of CinemaBlend, said the show "cleverly tackles pent-up emotions and storylines through song".

On Rotten Tomatoes, the second season has an approval rating of 83% based on 6 critic reviews, with an average rating of 8.37/10.

=== Ratings ===
Viewership and ratings per season of Zoey's Extraordinary Playlist
Season	Timeslot (ET)	Episodes	First aired		Last aired		TV season	Viewership rank	Avg. viewers (millions)
Season	Timeslot (ET)	Episodes	Date	Viewers (millions)	Date	Viewers (millions)	TV season	Viewership rank	Avg. viewers (millions)
1	Sunday 9:00 p.m.	12	January 7, 2020	2.66	May 3, 2020	1.98	2019–20	102	3.06
2	Tuesday 8:00 p.m. (1−6); Sunday 9:00 p.m. (7−13)	13	January 5, 2021	3.01	May 16, 2021	1.28	2020–21	109	2.60

==== Season 1 ====
Viewership and ratings per episode of Zoey's Extraordinary Playlist
No.	Title	Air date	Rating (18–49)	Viewers (millions)	DVR (18–49)	DVR viewers (millions)	Total (18–49)	Total viewers (millions)
1	"Pilot"	January 7, 2020	0.6	2.66	—N/a	1.05	—N/a	3.71
2	"Zoey's Extraordinary Best Friend"	February 16, 2020	0.4	2.01	0.3	1.06	0.7	3.08
3	"Zoey's Extraordinary Boss"	February 23, 2020	0.5	1.96	0.2	1.01	0.7	2.96
4	"Zoey's Extraordinary Neighbor"	March 1, 2020	0.4	2.06	0.3	1.14	0.7	3.20
5	"Zoey's Extraordinary Failure"	March 8, 2020	0.3	1.93	0.3	0.89	0.6	2.82
6	"Zoey's Extraordinary Night Out"	March 15, 2020	0.4	1.93	0.3	1.06	0.7	2.99
7	"Zoey's Extraordinary Confession"	March 22, 2020	0.4	1.95	0.3	1.03	0.7	2.98
8	"Zoey's Extraordinary Glitch"	March 29, 2020	0.4	1.88	0.3	1.01	0.7	2.89
9	"Zoey's Extraordinary Silence"	April 5, 2020	0.4	1.94	0.3	1.10	0.7	3.05
10	"Zoey's Extraordinary Outburst"	April 19, 2020	0.4	1.98	—N/a	1.16	—N/a	3.14
11	"Zoey's Extraordinary Mother"	April 26, 2020	0.3	1.70	0.3	1.22	0.6	2.92
12	"Zoey's Extraordinary Dad"	May 3, 2020	0.4	1.98	0.3	0.99	0.7	2.96

==== Season 2 ====
Viewership and ratings per episode of Zoey's Extraordinary Playlist
No.	Title	Air date	Rating (18–49)	Viewers (millions)	DVR (18–49)	DVR viewers (millions)	Total (18–49)	Total viewers (millions)
1	"Zoey's Extraordinary Return"	January 5, 2021	0.5	3.01	0.2	0.81	0.7	3.82
2	"Zoey's Extraordinary Distraction"	January 12, 2021	0.5	2.66	0.2	0.71	0.7	3.37
3	"Zoey's Extraordinary Dreams"	January 19, 2021	0.4	2.41	0.2	0.62	0.6	3.03 (Note: Live+7 ratings were unavailable, so Live+3 ratings have been used instead.)
4	"Zoey's Extraordinary Employee"	January 26, 2021	0.5	2.31	—N/a	—N/a	—N/a	—N/a
5	"Zoey's Extraordinary Trip"	February 2, 2021	0.4	2.24	0.1	0.59	0.5	2.83
6	"Zoey's Extraordinary Reckoning"	February 9, 2021	0.4	2.19	—N/a	—N/a	—N/a	—N/a
7	"Zoey's Extraordinary Memory"	March 28, 2021	0.2	1.20	0.2	0.81	0.4	2.01
8	"Zoey's Extraordinary Birthday"	April 4, 2021	0.2	1.18	0.2	0.76	0.4	1.94
9	"Zoey's Extraordinary Mystery"	April 11, 2021	0.3	1.43	0.2	0.75	0.5	2.18
10	"Zoey's Extraordinary Girls' Night"	April 18, 2021	0.3	1.20	0.1	0.73	0.4	1.93
11	"Zoey's Extraordinary Double Date"	May 2, 2021	0.3	1.30	0.2	0.78	0.5	2.07
12	"Zoey's Extraordinary Session"	May 9, 2021	0.3	1.31	0.2	0.81	0.5	2.11
13	"Zoey's Extraordinary Goodbye"	May 16, 2021	0.3	1.28	0.2	0.73	0.4	2.01

=== Accolades ===
Year	Award	Category	Nominee(s)	Result	Ref.
2020	Hollywood Critics Association Midseason Awards	Best Broadcast Network Series (New or Recurring)	Zoey's Extraordinary Playlist	Runner-up	
2020	Primetime Emmy Awards	Outstanding Choreography for Scripted Programming	Mandy Moore (Routines: "All I Do Is Win" / "I've Got the Music in Me" / "Crazy")	Won	
2020	Television Critics Association Awards	Outstanding New Program	Zoey's Extraordinary Playlist	Nominated	
2021	Critics' Choice Television Awards	Best Supporting Actor in a Comedy Series	Alex Newell	Nominated	
2021	Golden Globe Awards	Best Actress – Television Series, Musical or Comedy	Jane Levy	Nominated	
2021	Hollywood Critics Association TV Awards	Best Broadcast Network Series, Comedy	Zoey's Extraordinary Playlist	Nominated	
2021	Hollywood Critics Association TV Awards	Best Actress in a Broadcast Network or Cable Series, Comedy	Jane Levy	Won	
2021	Hollywood Critics Association TV Awards	Best Supporting Actor in a Broadcast Network or Cable Series, Comedy	Skylar Astin	Nominated	
2021	Hollywood Critics Association TV Awards	Best Supporting Actor in a Broadcast Network or Cable Series, Comedy	Alex Newell	Nominated	
2021	Hollywood Critics Association TV Awards	Best Supporting Actor in a Broadcast Network or Cable Series, Comedy	John Clarence Stewart	Nominated	
2021	Hollywood Critics Association TV Awards	Best Supporting Actress in a Broadcast Network or Cable Series, Comedy	Mary Steenburgen	Won	
2021	Motion Picture Sound Editors Awards	Outstanding Achievement in Sound Editing - Episodic Short Form – Music	Jaclyn Newman Dorn (for "Pilot")	Nominated	
2021	Primetime Emmy Awards	Outstanding Guest Actress in a Comedy Series	Bernadette Peters (for "Zoey's Extraordinary Girls' Night")	Nominated	
2021	Primetime Emmy Awards	Outstanding Choreography for Scripted Programming	Mandy Moore and Luther Brown (Routines: "Black Man in a White World" / "Tightrope")	Nominated	
2021	Primetime Emmy Awards	Outstanding Choreography for Scripted Programming	Mandy Moore (Routines: "Hello Dolly" / "Starships" / "Let's Get Loud")	Nominated	
2021	Primetime Emmy Awards	Outstanding Music Direction	Harvey Mason Jr. (for "Zoey's Extraordinary Goodbye")	Nominated	
2021	Primetime Emmy Awards	Outstanding Original Music and Lyrics	"Crimson Love" – Harvey Mason Jr., Andrew Hey, Austin Winsberg and Lindsey Rosin (for "Zoey's Extraordinary Birthday")	Nominated	
2021	Television Critics Association Awards	Outstanding Achievement in Comedy	Zoey's Extraordinary Playlist	Nominated	
2022	Primetime Emmy Awards	Outstanding Television Movie	Zoey's Extraordinary Christmas	Nominated	
2022	Primetime Emmy Awards	Outstanding Choreography for Scripted Programming	Mandy Moore and Jillian Myers (Routines: It's the Most Wonderful Time of the Year/We Need a Little Christmas/Just the Two of Us)	Nominated	

== See also ==
- Jukebox musical
