= Alice Lee (actress) =

American actress

- Born: Glenview, Illinois, U.S.
- Occupations: Actress, singer
- Years active: 2009–present

Alice Lee is an American actress and singer. She is known for originating the role of Heather Duke in the Off-Broadway production of Heathers: The Musical and for the role of Emily Kang on Zoey's Extraordinary Playlist.

== Early life ==
Lee is a native of North Shore, Chicago, grew up in Glenview, and attended Glenbrook South High School. She is of Korean descent.

== Career ==
In 2009, Lee started her career in the television soap opera series As the World Turns. Lee originated the role of Heather Duke in the Off-Broadway production Heathers: The Musical in 2014, she also appeared in the reality television singing competition Rising Star. Lee played the role of Emily in the television series Zoey's Extraordinary Playlist. While she originally auditioned for the role of Mo, she was instead offered the role of Zoey's sister-in-law in the series. Since 2023, Lee has voiced Lois Lane in the animated series My Adventures with Superman. In the NBC series Suits LA, Lee played a young associate attorney, Leah Power. Lee stars in the film People We Meet on Vacation (2026).

== Filmography ==
=== Film ===
Year	Title	Role	Notes
2013	Jack, Jules, Esther and Me	Esther	
2016	Alone	Penelope's Friend	
2017	Wish Upon	Gina	
2017	Bigfoot's Love Slave	The Girl	Short film
2018	Sierra Burgess Is a Loser	Mackenzie	
2019	Brittany Runs a Marathon	Gretchen	
2024	The Union	Athena Kim	
2024	All That We Love	Maggie	
2026	People We Meet on Vacation	Rachel	

=== Television ===
Year	Title	Role	Notes
2009	As the World Turns	Mackenzie Wong	
2013	It Could Be Worse	Emily	Episode: "I Forgive You!"
2013	Smash	Bombshell Fan #1	Episode: "The Nominations"
2013	Hey Girl	Megan/Lori	2 episodes
2014	Rising Star	Contestant	3 episodes
2015	Sex & Drugs & Rock & Roll	Colleen	Episode: "What You Like is in the Lime"
2015	DeTour	Annika	TV movie
2015–2016	Faking It	Keiko Flynn	Recurring role (Seasons 2–3)
2015–2017	Switched at Birth	Skye	Recurring role (7 episodes)
2016	Grandfathered	Tory	Episode: "Budget Spa"
2016	The Mindy Project	Chloe	Episode: "Will They or Won't They"
2016	Son of Zorn	Nancy	Episode: "Defender of Teen Love"
2016	K.C. Undercover	Jane Keller	Episode: "In Too Deep"
2017	2 Broke Girls	Ashleigh	Episode: "And the Turtle Sense"
2017	Gap Year	May	Main role
2017	Indoor Boys	Alice	2 episodes
2018	Philip K. Dick's Electric Dreams	Milena	Episode: "Safe and Sound"
2018	Splitting Up Together	Grace	Episode: "Soups Jealous"
2018	Take Two	Monica	Main role
2018	Swipe Right	Britney	Recurring role, 6 episodes
2020	The Real Bros of Simi Valley	Chelsie	Recurring role, 8 episodes
2020–2021	Zoey's Extraordinary Playlist	Emily	Recurring season 1, main season 2
2021	Zoey's Extraordinary Christmas	Emily	Television film
2023–2024	Mickey Mouse Funhouse	Ye Eun	Voice role, 2 episodes
2023–present	My Adventures with Superman	Lois Lane	Main voice role
2025	Suits LA	Leah Power	Recurring role, 8 episodes

== Theatre ==
Theatre credits
Year	Title	Role	Location	Notes
2006	Spring Awakening	Ensemble, Wendla (understudy/replacement)	Eugene O'Neill Theatre	
2011	Spider-Man: Turn Off the Dark	Miss Arrow	Foxwoods Theatre	Role cut during previews
2012–2013	Bare: The Musical	Diane	New World Stages	
2013–2014	Heathers: The Musical	Heather Duke	New World Stages	

== Discography ==
Year	Title	Type	Album
2014	Heathers: The Musical [World Premiere Cast Recording]	album	
2015	"Beat This"	album track	Truly Outrageous: A Jem and the Holograms Tribute
2016	"In Love With Drew"	single	
2016	"Trouble"	single	
2023	"In My Bed"	single	
2024	"Wasted On You"	single	
