= The Faithful: Women of the Bible =

2026 American historical drama television miniseries

- Also known as: The Faithful
- Genre: Historical drama
- Created by: René Echevarria
- Starring: Minnie Driver; Jeffrey Donovan; Natacha Karam; Alexa Davalos; Tom Mison; Tom Payne; Ben Robson; Millie Brady; Blu Hunt; James Purefoy; Will Stevens; Taylor Napier
- Composer: Benjamin Wallfisch
- Country of origin: United States
- Original language: English
- No. of episodes: 3

Production
- Executive producers: Carol Mendelsohn; Julie Weitz; René Echevarria
- Camera setup: Multi-camera
- Production companies: Siesta Productions; Carol Mendelsohn Productions; Fox Entertainment Studios

Original release
- Network: Fox
- Release: March 22 – April 5, 2026

The Faithful: Women of the Bible, also known as The Faithful, is an American Biblical historical drama television miniseries which premiered on March 22, 2026 on Fox.

== Premise ==
The Faithful showcases a faithful dramatization of the Book of Genesis as told through the eyes of the courageous and passionate, yet flawed women whose descendants would shape the future of faith as it is known today. The series unfolds through the interwoven stories of five women whose lives were marked by quests for independence, deep-seated desires, and the desperate need for something far greater than they have ever known.

== Cast and characters ==
=== Part 1 ===
- Minnie Driver as Sarah
- Jeffrey Donovan as Abraham
- Natacha Karam as Hagar

=== Part 2 ===
- Alexa Davalos as Rebekah
- Tom Mison as Isaac
- Tom Payne as Jacob
- Ben Robson as Esau

=== Part 3 ===
- Millie Brady as Leah
- Blu Hunt as Rachel
- James Purefoy as Laban
- Will Stevens as Birham
- Taylor Napier as Acar

== Episodes ==
| No. | Title | Directed by | Written by | Original release date | Prod. code | U.S. viewers (millions) | Rating (18-49) |
|---|---|---|---|---|---|---|---|
| 1 | "The Woman Who Bowed to No One" | Danny Cannon | René Echevarria | March 22, 2026 | FAI-101/102 | N/A | TBA |
| 2 | "The Woman Who Risked Everything" | Catriona McKenzie | Amy Berg | March 29, 2026 | FAI-103/104 | N/A | TBA |
| 3 | "The Women Who Loved" | Daniel Barnz | Francisca X. Hu | April 5, 2026 | FAI-105/106 | N/A | TBA |

== Production ==
=== Development ===
On May 9, 2025, it was announced that Fox had ordered the series. On July 16, 2025, it was announced that Danny Cannon would direct the first episode.

=== Casting ===
On July 16, 2025, the cast of Part 1 was announced. On August 21, 2025, the cast of Part 2 was announced. On October 8, 2025, the cast of Part 3 was announced.
