= John Clarence Stewart =

American actor and singer

- Born: August 16, 1988 (age 38); Stone Mountain, Georgia, U.S.
- Education: Columbus State University (BFA); Kennesaw State University (BA)
- Occupations: Actor; singer
- Years active: 2013–present
- Partner(s): Natacha Karam (2020–present; engaged)

John Clarence Stewart (born August 16, 1988) is an American actor and singer, best known for his role as Simon on Zoey's Extraordinary Playlist (2020–21). Prior to that, Stewart was recognized for portraying Alex Wesley on Luke Cage (2016–18) and Lionel on What/If (2019).

== Early life ==
Stewart was born in 1988 in Stone Mountain, Georgia. He initially attended Shiloh High School before transferring to George Walton Academy on a football scholarship for one year. His senior year he transferred back to Shiloh High School. He performed in his school musical Once on This Island. He attended Columbus State University, graduating in 2009 with a BFA in Performance Theater. He then attended Kennesaw State University, graduating in 2012 with a BA in Theater and Performance Studies and Dance. Thereafter he performed educational theatre for Kaiser Permanente, along with many plays at Atlanta's Alliance Theatre including The Whipping Man, Choir Boy and A Christmas Carol. He also taught at the theatre's summer camp. While working on Choir Boy, John understudied the production at Manhattan Theatre Club (which co-produced with Alliance Theatre). John premiered the role of Tray in brownsville song (b-side for tray) at Actors Theatre of Louisville. Before moving to New York, John also performed in Bull Durham, a musical adaptation of the film by Ron Shelton, at the Alliance. At 24 years old he moved to New York City and then to Los Angeles to further pursue acting.

== Career ==
Stewart made his professional debut portraying John in The Whipping Man (2013) at the Alliance Theatre. He performed in additional productions by the theatre and starred as Tray in brownsville song (b-side for tray) (2014) at the Actors Theatre of Louisville, and as Wanre in Fit for a Queen (2016) at the Classical Theatre of Harlem.

In 2015, Stewart made his television debut in Gotham as Officer Griffin Katz. He continued appearing in guest roles on several television shows, with his first major television role as Alex Wesley in Luke Cage (2016–2018). In 2019 he gained further recognition for portraying Lionel in the Netflix series What/If (2019). His breakthrough role came in 2020 portraying Simon in Zoey's Extraordinary Playlist.

He will join NBC medical drama Brilliant Minds as a series regular for its second season.

== Personal life ==
Stewart is officially engaged to his long-time partner, 9-1-1: Lone Star actress Natacha Karam as of June 2026, and announced his engagement to fans on social media.

The milestone comes after the pair shared the screen on Fox's 9-1-1: Lone Star, where Stewart made a guest appearance as Joe, the on-screen partner and eventual television husband to Karam's character, Marjan Marwani.

== Filmography ==
=== Television ===
Year	Title	Role	Notes
2015	Gotham	Officer Griffin Katz	Episode: "All Happy Families Are Alike"
2015	The Mysteries of Laura	Clint	Episode: "The Mystery of the Crooked Clubber"
2015	Blue Bloods	Officer Keith Roosevelt	Episode: "The Bullitt Mustang"
2016–2018	Luke Cage	Alex Wesley	13 episodes
2017	The Good Fight	Leigh Hunter	Episode: "Inauguration"
2017	Skin Deep	Marcus	4 episodes
2019	Hawaii Five-0	Hilo	Episode: "Ke ala o ka pu"
2019	What/If	Lionel	Main role
2020–2021	Zoey's Extraordinary Playlist	Simon Haynes	Main role
2022	P-Valley	Thaddeus Wilks/Big Teak	Recurring
2023	9-1-1: Lone Star	Joe/Yusuf Adiyah	3 episodes
2025–2026	Brilliant Minds	Dr. Anthony Thorne	Main (Season 2)
