= Stephanie Styles =

American actress, singer, and dancer (born 1991)

- Born: Stephanie Noel Styles; October 7, 1991 (age 34); Houston, Texas, U.S.
- Education: University of Michigan (BFA)
- Occupations: Actress; dancer; singer
- Years active: 2002–present

Stephanie Noel Styles is an American actress, singer, and dancer. She made her professional theatre debut in a 2003 U.S. tour of The Sound of Music, and later made her Broadway debut in Roundabout Theatre's 2019 revival of Kiss Me, Kate. Her appearances on film and television include the role of Ainsley on Loot, since 2022.

== Early life and education ==
Styles was born and raised in Houston, Texas. She is the eldest daughter of Tony-award winning producer John Styles Jr. and Bridget Styles. She has a younger brother, John Henry.

Her interest in theater began at the age of four, after she saw The Phantom of the Opera in New York City, and her parents took her backstage; within weeks her parents had her enrolled at the Humphreys School of Musical Theatre in Houston, Texas.

Styles graduated from Episcopal High School in 2010 and earned the headmaster's Head of School Award. In April 2010 she represented Texas and was a semifinalist at the National Shakespeare Competition at Lincoln Center in New York City. In June 2010, Styles was named a top three finalist for the National High School Musical Theatre Awards (also known as the "Jimmy Awards") after earning the regional 2010 Tommy Tune award for best actress.

She then attended the University of Michigan, earning a BFA in musical theatre in 2014.

== Career ==
In 2003 Styles was cast as Louisa von Trapp in the national tour of The Sound of Music. In 2006 she starred as The Rose in The Little Prince at the New York City Opera.

In 2014, Styles was cast as Katherine Plumber in Disney's first North American Tour of Newsies. She left the tour along with co-star Dan DeLuca in 2015.

In 2016, Styles appeared as Suz Miller in Jenny Rachel Weiner's Kingdom Come at Roundabout Underground’s Black Box Theatre. In 2017, she portrayed Princess Ann opposite Drew Gehling in the musical Roman Holiday at the Golden Gate Theatre in San Francisco, California.

Styles made her Broadway debut as Lois Lane/Bianca in the Roundabout Theatre Company's 2019 revival of Cole Porter's musical comedy Kiss Me, Kate on March 14, 2019, starring opposite Kelli O'Hara, Will Chase, and Corbin Bleu.

On television, she has appeared in recurring roles on Zoey's Extraordinary Playlist and Loot. In 2026, Styles voiced Meg Giry in Erin A. Craig's audiobook Our Strange Duet (2026), a new reimagining and followup to Andrew Lloyd Webber's musical The Phantom of the Opera.

== Theatre credits ==
Year	Title	Role	Theatre	Ref.
2003	The Sound of Music	Louisa von Trapp	U.S. National Tour	
2005	The Little Prince	The Rose	New York City Opera	
2006	The Secret Garden	Mary Lennox	Main Street Theater	
2012	Bloody Bloody Andrew Jackson	Rachel	Hamman Hall	
2014–2015	Newsies	Katherine Plumber	1st North American Tour	
2016	Kingdom Come	Suz Miller	Roundabout Underground Black Box Theatre	
2017	Roman Holiday	Princess Ann	Golden Gate Theatre	
2019	Kiss Me, Kate	Lois Lane/Bianca	Studio 54 (Note: Broadway production)	
2021	Goosebumps The Musical: Phantom Of The Auditorium	Tina Powell	Original Studio Cast Recording	
2025	Urinetown	Hope Cladwell	Off-Broadway; Encores!	

== Filmography ==
=== Film ===
Year	Title	Role	Notes
2015	The Submarine Kid	Nurse	
2019	Booksmart	Alison	
2019	Bombshell	Olivia	

=== Television ===
Year	Title	Role	Notes
2018	Glimpse	Evelyn	Episode: "Circuits"
2018	Three Rivers	Leanne	TV movie
2018	American Vandal	Jenna Hawthorne (voice)	2 episodes
2019	Bonding	Kate	Recurring role (season 1)
2020	Zoey's Extraordinary Playlist	Autumn	Recurring role (season 1)
2021	Pretty Smart	Karen	Episode: "Here's the tea! Jayden found a pottery twunk!"
2022	Loot	Ainsley	Recurring role (season 1), main cast (seasons 2–)
2024	Curb Your Enthusiasm	Jenna	Episode: "Fish Stuck"

== Awards and nominations ==
Year	Award	Category	Nominated work	Result	Ref.
2019	Broadway.com Audience Awards	Favorite Breakthrough Performance – Female	Kiss Me, Kate	Won	

=== Special honors and awards ===
- 2010 – Top 3 finalist for the National High School Musical Theatre Award
