= List of feature films with gay characters: 2020s =

Symbol for male homosexuality

The following is a list of feature films with fictional and factual gay characters. The films were released theatrically, direct-to-video, or on a streaming platform (OTT network).

Films are in alphabetical order by year of release. Titles beginning with determiners "A", "An", and "The" are alphabetized by the first significant word.

== 2020–2024 ==
List
Year	Title	Character(s)	Actor	Notes	Country	Ref(s)
2020	The Boys in the Band	Michael	Jim Parsons	Based on the 1968 play of the same name, a group of men gather for a birthday party in New York City.	United States	
2020	The Boys in the Band	Harold	Zachary Quinto	Based on the 1968 play of the same name, a group of men gather for a birthday party in New York City.	United States	
2020	The Boys in the Band	Donald	Matt Bomer	Based on the 1968 play of the same name, a group of men gather for a birthday party in New York City.	United States	
2020	The Boys in the Band	Larry	Andrew Rannells	Based on the 1968 play of the same name, a group of men gather for a birthday party in New York City.	United States	
2020	The Boys in the Band	Cowboy	Charlie Carver	Based on the 1968 play of the same name, a group of men gather for a birthday party in New York City.	United States	
2020	The Boys in the Band	Emory	Robin de Jesús	Based on the 1968 play of the same name, a group of men gather for a birthday party in New York City.	United States	
2020	The Boys in the Band	Bernard	Michael Benjamin Washington	Based on the 1968 play of the same name, a group of men gather for a birthday party in New York City.	United States	
2020	The Boys in the Band	Hank	Tuc Watkins	Based on the 1968 play of the same name, a group of men gather for a birthday party in New York City.	United States	
2020	Breaking Fast	Kal	Michael Cassidy	Mo is a Muslim doctor in Los Angeles who is emotionally closed off following a painful breakup with his former partner Hassan.	United States	
2020	Breaking Fast	Mo	Haaz Sleiman	Mo is a Muslim doctor in Los Angeles who is emotionally closed off following a painful breakup with his former partner Hassan.	United States	
2020	Falling	John Peterson	Viggo Mortensen	John lives with his husband Eric in California.	United States	
2020	Falling	Eric Peterson	Terry Chen	John lives with his husband Eric in California.	United States	
2020	Fantasy Island	Brax Weaver / Tattoo	Jimmy O. Yang	Brax is the stepbrother of JD.	United States	
2020	Freaky	Josh Detmer	Misha Osherovich	Josh is Millie's best friend.	United States	
2020	Happiest Season	John	Dan Levy	John is Abby's best friend.	United States	
2020	Isa Pang Bahaghari	Domingo "Domeng" delos Reyes	Phillip Salvador	Long-time friend of Rey, a returning seaman aiming to amend with his estranged wife and children. Domeng, a baklang martir who has unrequited love towards Rey since their teenage years, seeks to help his friend regarding his family issue.	Philippines	
2020	Joe Bell	Jadin Bell	Reid Miller	Following the true story of a man named Joe Bell, who sets out walking across America to speak out against bullying and honoring his teenage son, Jadin Bell, who died by suicide after he was bullied for being gay.	United States	
2020	Jump, Darling	Russell	Thomas Duplessie	A rookie drag queen reeling from a break-up.	Canada	
2020	My Spy	Carlos	Devere Rogers	Carlos, Sophie's neighbor, and Todd are partners.	United States	
2020	My Spy	Todd	Noah Danby	Carlos, Sophie's neighbor, and Todd are partners.	United States	
2020	The Old Guard	Yusuf Al-Kaysani / Joe	Marwan Kenzari	Yusuf is a Saracen who fought against the Crusaders, and Niccolò is a Genovese knight who fought in the Crusades. They are in a romantic relationship.	United States	
2020	The Old Guard	Niccolò di Genova / Nicky	Luca Marinelli	Yusuf is a Saracen who fought against the Crusaders, and Niccolò is a Genovese knight who fought in the Crusades. They are in a romantic relationship.	United States	
2020	The Prom	Barry Glickman	James Corden	Barry is a narcissistic Broadway actor.	United States	
2020	Riders of Justice	Bodashka	Gustav Lindh	Bodashka is a trafficked Ukrainian sex slave.	Denmark, Estonia	
2020	Shubh Mangal Zyada Saavdhan	Kartik Singh	Ayushmann Khurrana	Kartik is an out young man in love with Aman, who is closeted. It is the first Bollywood feature film to show two men kissing passionately.	India	
2020	Shubh Mangal Zyada Saavdhan	Aman Tripathi	Jitendra Kumar	Kartik is an out young man in love with Aman, who is closeted. It is the first Bollywood feature film to show two men kissing passionately.	India	
2020	Stage Mother	Ricky Metcalf	Eldon Thiele	Following a conservative church choir director who inherits a drag club in San Francisco started by her deceased son Ricky, from whom she was estranged after he came out as gay.	United States	
2020	Summer of 85	Alexis Robin	Félix Lefebvre	The intense friendship and romance of teenagers Alexis and David during a summer in Normandy in 1985.	France	
2020	Supernova	Sam	Colin Firth	Sam and Tusker are partners for 20 years and amateur astronomers.	United Kingdom	
2020	Supernova	Tusker	Stanley Tucci	Sam and Tusker are partners for 20 years and amateur astronomers.	United Kingdom	
2020	The Thing About Harry	Sam Baselli	Jake Borelli	Sam connects with his high school bully Harry, who reveals to him that he is pansexual. Sam begins a romantic relationship with Harry, and they later marry.	United States	
2020	Uncle Frank	Frank Bledsoe	Paul Bettany	A college professor who has been living with a man named Walid ("Wally") for over ten years and tries to come out to his family.	United States	
2020	Your Name Engraved Herein	Chang Jia-han	Edward Chen Hao-Sen	Chang Jia-han and Wang Po Tea are students who fall in love.	Taiwan	
2020	Your Name Engraved Herein	Wang Po Te	Jing-Hua Tseng	Chang Jia-han and Wang Po Tea are students who fall in love.	Taiwan	
2021	Benediction	Siegfried Sassoon	Jack Lowden	Following the life of Siegfried Sassoon, a British poet and decorated World War I combat veteran who was sent to a psychiatric facility for his anti-war stance. He had love affairs with several men during the 1920s.	United Kingdom	
2021	Benediction	Siegfried Sassoon	Peter Capaldi	Following the life of Siegfried Sassoon, a British poet and decorated World War I combat veteran who was sent to a psychiatric facility for his anti-war stance. He had love affairs with several men during the 1920s.	United States	
2021	Candyman	Troy Cartwright	Nathan Stewart-Jarrett	Grady's partner is Troy, Brianna's brother.	United States, Canada	
2021	Candyman	Grady Greenberg	Kyle Kaminsky	Grady's partner is Troy, Brianna's brother.	United States, Canada	
2021	Cruella	Artie	John McCrea	Artie is the first openly gay character in a live-action Disney film.	United States	
2021	Dear Evan Hansen	Jared Kalwani	Nik Dodani	Jared is Evan's friend.	United States	
2021	The Dig	Stuart Piggott	Ben Chaplin	In the movie, the marriage between real life archeologists Stuart Piggott and his wife Peggy is portrayed as a May–September relationship between the young, fresh-out-of-grad school Peggy and the older, closeted gay man Stuart.	United Kingdom	
2021	Everybody's Talking About Jamie	Jamie New / Mimi Me	Max Harwood	Jamie wants to be a drag queen.	United Kingdom, United States	
2021	The Fallout	Nick Feinstein	Will Ropp	Nick is Vada's best friend.	United States	
2021	The French Dispatch	Roebuck Wright	Jeffrey Wright	Wright is an American author who chose exile in Ennui-sur-Blasé. He became a food writer, and his report here is centered on Lieutenant Nescaffier, the greatest chef of police cuisine.	United States	
2021	Great Freedom	Hans Hoffmann	Franz Rogowski	In post-World War II West Germany, Hans is imprisoned by the post war government having previously been imprisoned in a concentration camp for infringing the Nazi anti-gay laws, which are still on the statute. Hans develops a relationship with his cellmate Viktor, a convicted murderer.	Austria, Germany	
2021	Great Freedom	Viktor Kohl	Georg Friedrich	In post-World War II West Germany, Hans is imprisoned by the post war government having previously been imprisoned in a concentration camp for infringing the Nazi anti-gay laws, which are still on the statute. Hans develops a relationship with his cellmate Viktor, a convicted murderer.	Austria, Germany	
2021	Halloween Kills	Big John	Scott MacArthur	Big John and Little John live together as a couple in Michael Myers' former house.	United States	
2021	Halloween Kills	Little John	Michael McDonald	Big John and Little John live together as a couple in Michael Myers' former house.	United States	
2021	Jungle Cruise	McGregor Houghton	Jack Whitehall	McGregor is the heroine's brother and reluctant assistant. He turned down three engagements with women because of his sexual orientation.	United States	
2021	Licorice Pizza	Joel Wachs	Benny Safdie	Joel is a politician running for Mayor of Los Angeles.	United States	
2021	Mascarpone	Antonio	Giancarlo Commare	Antonio is a gay man searching his path in life after his husband Enrico breaks up with him. He is helped by Denis and Luca, who also sleep with him.	Italy	
2021	Mascarpone	Denis	Eduardo Valdarnini	Antonio is a gay man searching his path in life after his husband Enrico breaks up with him. He is helped by Denis and Luca, who also sleep with him.	Italy	
2021	Mascarpone	Enrico	Fabio Fappiano	Antonio is a gay man searching his path in life after his husband Enrico breaks up with him. He is helped by Denis and Luca, who also sleep with him.	Italy	
2021	Mascarpone	Luca	Gianmarco Saurino	Antonio is a gay man searching his path in life after his husband Enrico breaks up with him. He is helped by Denis and Luca, who also sleep with him.	Italy	
2021	Moneyboys	Liang Fei	Kai Ko	Featuring the journey of Liang Fei, whose world collapses when he realizes that his family accepts his money but not his homosexuality.	Taiwan, Austria, France, Belgium	
2021	No Time to Die	Q	Ben Whishaw	When James Bond and Moneypenny arrived at Q's house, Q was setting up a date for himself and another man.	United Kingdom, United States	
2021	Operation Hyacinth	Arek	Hubert Miłkowski	Arek is an informant in the investigation of murdered gay men.	Poland	
2021	The Power of the Dog	Phil Burbank	Benedict Cumberbatch	Phil is a repressed homosexual, and a charismatic rancher who likes to torment his brother's wife and step-son.	United Kingdom, Australia, United States, Canada, New Zealand	
2021	Single All the Way	Peter	Michael Urie	Peter asks his best friend Nick to pose as his boyfriend, and they develop feelings for each other. James is the blind date that Peter's mother sets him up with.	United States	
2021	Single All the Way	Nick	Philemon Chambers	Peter asks his best friend Nick to pose as his boyfriend, and they develop feelings for each other. James is the blind date that Peter's mother sets him up with.	United States	
2021	Single All the Way	James	Luke Macfarlane	Peter asks his best friend Nick to pose as his boyfriend, and they develop feelings for each other. James is the blind date that Peter's mother sets him up with.	United States	
2021	Swan Song	Dustin	Michael Urie	Dustin is Rita's nephew.	United States	
2021	Swan Song	Pat Pitsenbarger	Udo Kier	Dustin is Rita's nephew.	United States	
2021	Tick, Tick... Boom!	Michael	Robin de Jesús	Michael is Jonathan's best friend.	United States	
2022	Aristotle and Dante Discover the Secrets of the Universe	Aristotle "Ari" Mendoza	Max Pelayo	Following two Mexican-American teenage boys who find an instant connection in 1987 El Paso, Texas	United States	
2022	Aristotle and Dante Discover the Secrets of the Universe	Dante Quintana	Reese Gonzales	Following two Mexican-American teenage boys who find an instant connection in 1987 El Paso, Texas	United States	
2022	Badhaai Do	Shardul Thakur	Rajkummar Rao	Shardul enters into a lavender marriage with Suman Singh to escape the pressure from their families.	India	
2022	The Blackening	Dewayne	Dewayne Perkins	Dewayne joins nine college besties at a cabin deep, deep in the woods over Juneteenth weekend when things takes a turn.	United States	
2022	Bros	Bobby Lieber	Billy Eichner	Following two men in Manhattan who avoid commitment but are drawn to each other.	United States	
2022	Bros	Aaron Shepard	Luke Macfarlane	Following two men in Manhattan who avoid commitment but are drawn to each other.	United States	
2022	Downton Abbey: A New Era	Thomas Barrow	Rob James-Collier	Uncloseted butler at the manor, he leaves to travel the world with Guy Dexter, a movie star in a film production filmed on the estate.	United Kingdom	
2022	Downton Abbey: A New Era	Thomas Barrow	Rob James-Collier	Uncloseted butler at the manor, he leaves to travel the world with Guy Dexter, a movie star in a film production filmed on the estate.	United States	
2022	Fire Island	Charlie	James Scully	Following a group of friends who go on vacation to Fire Island, only for things to become complicated by classism and romance.	United States	
2022	Fire Island	Howie	Bowen Yang	Following a group of friends who go on vacation to Fire Island, only for things to become complicated by classism and romance.	United States	
2022	Fire Island	Noah	Joel Kim Booster	Following a group of friends who go on vacation to Fire Island, only for things to become complicated by classism and romance.	United States	
2022	Fire Island	Will	Conrad Ricamora	Following a group of friends who go on vacation to Fire Island, only for things to become complicated by classism and romance.	United States	
2022	The Inspection	Ellis French	Jeremy Pope	Following a young black man who defiantly endures brutal training at a Marine Corps boot camp, seeking approval from his homophobic mother.	United States	
2022	A Madea Homecoming	Timothy "Tim" Marshall	Brandon Black	Tim is Cora's grandson and Laura's son who is struggling to come out	United States	
2022	The Holiday Sitter	Jason	George Krissa	When Sam is babysitting his sister's kids, he meets her gay neighbour Jason and begins a relationship with him.	Canada, United States	
2022	The Holiday Sitter	Sam	Jonathan Bennett	When Sam is babysitting his sister's kids, he meets her gay neighbour Jason and begins a relationship with him.	Canada, United States	
2022	My Fake Boyfriend	Andrew	Keiynan Lonsdale	Andrew is trying to find a way to get over his toxic ex-boyfriend when meddling friends Jake and Kelly get involved.	Canada	
2022	My Policeman	Patrick Hazlewood	David Dawson	Set in 1950s Brighton, Patrick is a museum curator in a relationship with a married policeman.	United States	
2022	My Policeman	Patrick Hazlewood	Rupert Everett	Set in 1950s Brighton, Patrick is a museum curator in a relationship with a married policeman.	United States	
2022	Punch	Jim	Jordan Oosterhof	Jim is a boxer growing up in a seaside town in New Zealand where homophobia is alive and kicking	New Zealand	
2022	See How They Run	Mervyn Cocker-Norris	David Oyelowo	Mervyn is a well-known playwright and screenwriter.	United States, United Kingdom	
2022	Spoiler Alert	Michael Ausiello	Jim Parsons	Based on the Ausiello's 2017 memoir Spoiler Alert: The Hero Dies.	United States	
2022	Spoiler Alert	Kit Cowan	Ben Aldridge	Based on the Ausiello's 2017 memoir Spoiler Alert: The Hero Dies.	United States	
2022	Swallowed	Benjamin	Cooper Koch	Benjamin is celebrating their last night together with his friend Dom in a small Maine town before Ben flies to Los Angeles to become a gay porn star.	United States	
2022	They/Them	Toby	Austin Crute	Toby, Stu, and Gabriel are all gay teenagers sent to a conversion camp, Whistler Camp, to cure their homosexuality.	United States	
2022	They/Them	Stu	Cooper Koch	Toby, Stu, and Gabriel are all gay teenagers sent to a conversion camp, Whistler Camp, to cure their homosexuality.	United States	
2022	They/Them	Gabriel	Darwin Del Fabro	Toby, Stu, and Gabriel are all gay teenagers sent to a conversion camp, Whistler Camp, to cure their homosexuality.	United States	
2022	Three Months	Caleb Kahn	Troye Sivan	Caleb is a South Florida boy realizes he has been exposed to HIV.	United States	
2022	Two And One	Tino	Miggy Jimenez	Tino and Chan are both "tops" and sexually incompatible. They agree to find a "bottom" to have a threesome with, and meet Joaquin.	Philippines	
2022	Two And One	Chan	Paolo Pangilinan	Tino and Chan are both "tops" and sexually incompatible. They agree to find a "bottom" to have a threesome with, and meet Joaquin.	Philippines	
2022	Two And One	Joaquin	Cedrick Juan	Tino and Chan are both "tops" and sexually incompatible. They agree to find a "bottom" to have a threesome with, and meet Joaquin.	Philippines	
2022	The Whale	Charlie	Brendan Fraser	Charlie left his family for a man, who later died. He then went on to binge eat out of pain and guilt.	United Kingdom, United States	
2022	Winter Boy	Lucas	Paul Kircher	Lucas is a teenager coping with the sudden and unexpected death of his father in an accident that may or may not have been suicide.	France	
2023	All of Us Strangers	Adam	Andrew Scott	Adam and Harry are neighbors in a modern London apartment tower, who develop a romantic relationship.	United Kingdom	
2023	All of Us Strangers	Harry	Paul Mescal	Adam and Harry are neighbors in a modern London apartment tower, who develop a romantic relationship.	United Kingdom	
2023	American Fiction	Clifford "Cliff" Ellison	Sterling K. Brown	Cliff is a plastic surgeon and brother to Monk and Lisa, who is recently uncloseted as a homosexual.	United States	
2023	Asteroid City	Conrad Earp	Edward Norton	Earp and Hall are lovers.	United States	
2023	Asteroid City	Jones Hall	Jason Schwartzman	Earp and Hall are lovers.	United States	
2023	Bones and Names	Boris	Fabian Stumm	Boris and Jonathan are a couple.	Germany	
2023	Bones and Names	Jonathan	Knut Berger	Boris and Jonathan are a couple.	Germany	
2023	Broken Heart's Trip	Alfred	Christian Bables	Plays as a host for a reality television show with five other LGBT contestants	Philippines	
2023	Cassandro	Cassandro	Gael García Bernal	Cassandro is a wrestler.	United States	
2023	The Critic	Jimmy Erskine	Ian McKellen	Erskine is a theatre critic.	United Kingdom	
2023	Dicks: The Musical	Harrison	Nathan Lane	Harrison is Craig and Trevor's newly out father.	United States	
2023	Down Low	Gary	Zachary Quinto	Gary is a newly-divorced father of two	United States	
2023	Drifter	Jonas	Gustav Schmidt	Moritz is a young man who moves to Berlin to be together with his lover Jonas. When this relationship ends, Moritz embarks on an odyssey to find his true self that takes him into Berlin's club culture.	Germany	
2023	Drifter	Moritz	Lorenz Hochhut	Moritz is a young man who moves to Berlin to be together with his lover Jonas. When this relationship ends, Moritz embarks on an odyssey to find his true self that takes him into Berlin's club culture.	Germany	
2023	Drifter	Noah	Cino Djavid	Noah has a short romantic relationship with Moritz.	Germany	
2023	Fairyland	Steve Abbott	Scoot McNairy	Shortly after the death of her mother in a car accident in 1973, Alysia Abbott moves to San Francisco to live with her father Steve Abbott, a poet and activist who has come out.	United States	
2023	Femme	Jules	Nathan Stewart-Jarrett	Jules is targeted in a horrific homophobic attack.	United States	
2023	Fireworks	Gianni Accordino	Samuele Segreto	Set in 1980s Sicily, Gianni and Nino are two teenagers that fall in love after Nino revives Gianni with mouth-to-mouth resuscitation. They face homophobic harassment after their relationship is noticed by their environment. The film is inspired by actual events.	Italy	
2023	Fireworks	Nino Scalia	Gabriele Pizzurro	Set in 1980s Sicily, Gianni and Nino are two teenagers that fall in love after Nino revives Gianni with mouth-to-mouth resuscitation. They face homophobic harassment after their relationship is noticed by their environment. The film is inspired by actual events.	Italy	
2023	Good Grief	Marc Dreyfus	Dan Levy	Oliver is Marc's late husband.	United States	
2023	Good Grief	Oliver	Luke Evans	Oliver is Marc's late husband.	United States	
2023	It's a Wonderful Knife	Jimmy Carruthers	Aiden Howard	Jimmy is the school's star quarterback and golden child of his family.	United States	
2023	Knock at the Cabin	Andrew	Ben Aldridge	Andrew and Eric are married.	United States	
2023	Knock at the Cabin	Eric	Jonathan Groff	Andrew and Eric are married.	United States	
2023	Marry My Dead Body	Mao Pang-yu (Mao Mao)	Austin Lin	Mao was discussing marriage with his boyfriend but died unjustly because of an accident.	Taiwan	
2023	Nuovo Olimpo	Enea	Damiano Gavino	Enea and Pietro are lovers.	Italy	
2023	Nuovo Olimpo	Pietro	Andrea Di Luigi	Enea and Pietro are lovers.	Italy	
2023	Our Son	Gabriel	Billy Porter	Gabriel and Nicky are a divorced couple battling for their son's custody.	United States	
2023	Our Son	Nicky	Luke Evans	Gabriel and Nicky are a divorced couple battling for their son's custody.	United States	
2023	Passages	Martin	Ben Whishaw	Martin is married to Tomas.	France	
2023	Red, White & Royal Blue	Prince Henry	Nicholas Galitzine	Henry is the spare to the British throne.	United States	
2023	Rustin	Bayard Rustin	Colman Domingo	Circling the life of civil rights activist Bayard Rustin.	United States	
2023	Strange Way of Life	Sheriff Jake	Ethan Hawke	Jake and Silva are old friends.	Spain	
2023	Strange Way of Life	Silva	Pedro Pascal	Jake and Silva are old friends.	Spain	
2023	Theater Camp	Gigi Charbonier	Owen Thiele	Charbonier is a flamboyant costume designer	United States	
2023	Unicorns	Ashiq / a.k.a. Aysha	Jason Patel	Ashiq, who was raised in a religious Muslim family, works at night as the drag queen Aysha. He falls in love with Luke Tilson, a straight mechanic.	United Kingdom, United States, Sweden	
2024	The Apprentice	Roy Cohn	Jeremy Strong	Cohn is a closeted attorney who represents and mentors Donald Trump during his early business career.	Canada, Denmark, Ireland, United States	
2024	The Astronaut Lovers	Pedro	Javier Orán	Pedro begins a playful relationship with his childhood crush Maxi, who recently broke up with his girlfriend.	Argentina, Spain	
2024	Carry-On	Mateo Flores	Tonatiuh	Flores and Jesse are married.	United States	
2024	Carry-On	Jesse	Adam Stephenson	Flores and Jesse are married.	United States	
2024	Chantal im Märchenland	Prince Bosco	Max von der Groeben	Bosco is a young prince who is in love with his stableman. Because of the homophobic world he lives in, he tries to hide his homosexuality.	Germany	
2024	Cranko	John Cranko	Sam Riley	Biopic about the life of South African ballet dancer and choreographer John Cranko.	Germany	
2024	Demons at Dawn	Marco	Axel Shuarma	Marco, a med student falls in love with the go-go dancer Orlando	Mexico	
2024	Demons at Dawn	Orlando	Luis Vegas	Marco, a med student falls in love with the go-go dancer Orlando	Mexico	
2024	Fly Me to the Moon	Lance Vespertine	Jim Rash	Vespertine is an auteur director and Kelly's friend, who goes to great lengths to shoot the perfect fake moon landing.	United States	
2024	Gotteskinder	Timo	Serafin Mishiev	Timo is part of an evangelical free church and tries to fight his homosexuality when he falls in love with his fellow student Jonas.	Germany	
2024	Griffin in Summer	Griffin Nafly	Everett Blunck	Nafly is a fourteen-year-old ambitious playwright, whose life take an unexpected turn when a handsome 25-year-old handyman named Brad hired by his mum enters the picture.	United States	
2024	High Tide	Lourenço	Marco Pigossi	Lourenço is a Brazilian Immigrant who develops a romance with Maurice, a nurse. Scott is the owner of the guest cottage Lourenço is staying in.	United States	
2024	High Tide	Maurice	James Bland	Lourenço is a Brazilian Immigrant who develops a romance with Maurice, a nurse. Scott is the owner of the guest cottage Lourenço is staying in.	United States	
2024	High Tide	Scott	Bill Irwin	Lourenço is a Brazilian Immigrant who develops a romance with Maurice, a nurse. Scott is the owner of the guest cottage Lourenço is staying in.	United States	
2024	High Tide	Todd	Bryan Batt	Lourenço is a Brazilian Immigrant who develops a romance with Maurice, a nurse. Scott is the owner of the guest cottage Lourenço is staying in.	United States	
2024	I Don't Understand You	Cole	Andrew Rannells	Cole and Dom are a couple.	United States	
2024	I Don't Understand You	Dom	Nick Kroll	Cole and Dom are a couple.	United States	
2024	Lilies Not for Me	Owen James	Fionn O'Shea	Set in 1920s Britain, Owen is a novelist confined to a medical facility to "cure" his homosexuality. Philip is a doctor who had been in a relationship with Owen.	United Kingdom, France, South Africa, United States	
2024	Lilies Not for Me	Philip	Robert Aramayo	Set in 1920s Britain, Owen is a novelist confined to a medical facility to "cure" his homosexuality. Philip is a doctor who had been in a relationship with Owen.	United Kingdom, France, South Africa, United States	
2024	Mascarpone: The Rainbow Cake	Antonio	Giancarlo Commare	Antonio is a confectioner who suffers from emotional constipation after the death of his friend Denis. After having an affair with Dario, he tries to rebuild the relationship with his former love Luca, who instead wants to marry his new boyfriend Tancredi.	Italy	
2024	Mascarpone: The Rainbow Cake	Dario	Giulio Corso	Antonio is a confectioner who suffers from emotional constipation after the death of his friend Denis. After having an affair with Dario, he tries to rebuild the relationship with his former love Luca, who instead wants to marry his new boyfriend Tancredi.	Italy	
2024	Mascarpone: The Rainbow Cake	Luca	Gianmarco Saurino	Antonio is a confectioner who suffers from emotional constipation after the death of his friend Denis. After having an affair with Dario, he tries to rebuild the relationship with his former love Luca, who instead wants to marry his new boyfriend Tancredi.	Italy	
2024	Mascarpone: The Rainbow Cake	Tancredi	Andrea Fuorto	Antonio is a confectioner who suffers from emotional constipation after the death of his friend Denis. After having an affair with Dario, he tries to rebuild the relationship with his former love Luca, who instead wants to marry his new boyfriend Tancredi.	Italy	
2024	Mother of the Bride	Clay	Michael McDonald	Clay and Scott are married and are old college friends of Lana.	United States	
2024	Mother of the Bride	Scott	Wilson Cruz	Clay and Scott are married and are old college friends of Lana.	United States	
2024	A Nice Indian Boy	Jay Kurundkar	Jonathan Groff	Jay and Naveen are in a romantic relationship.	United States	
2024	A Nice Indian Boy	Naveen Gavaskar	Karan Soni	Jay and Naveen are in a romantic relationship.	United States	
2024	On Swift Horses	Henry	Diego Calva	Korean War veteran Julius finds work in a Las Vegas casino and begins a secret romantic affair with a male co-worker, Henry.	United States	
2024	On Swift Horses	Julius	Jacob Elordi	Korean War veteran Julius finds work in a Las Vegas casino and begins a secret romantic affair with a male co-worker, Henry.	United States	
2024	Queer	William Lee	Daniel Craig	In 1940s Mexico City, American expat Lee becomes infatuated with drug user Allerton, a discharged American Navy.	Italy, United States	
2024	A Quiet Place: Day One	Eric	Joseph Quinn	Eric is a law student who joins Sam in escaping from the creatures. (His sexuality is never revealed in the film and was only described as such after release by the film's director.)	United States	
2024	The Radleys	Rowan Radley	Harry Baxendale	Rowan is the Radleys' son that lusts after his neighbor Evan.	United Kingdom	
2024	Ricky Stanicky	Wes	Jermaine Fowler	Wes is one of the three friends who created the "Ricky Stanicky" persona to avoid blame for a fire accident. He is the boyfriend of Keith.	Australia, United Kingdom, United States	
2024	Ricky Stanicky	Keith	Daniel Monks	Wes is one of the three friends who created the "Ricky Stanicky" persona to avoid blame for a fire accident. He is the boyfriend of Keith.	Australia, United Kingdom, United States	
2024	Sad Jokes	Joseph	Fabian Stumm	Joseph is a gay filmmaker who has a child with his friend Sonya.	Germany	
2024	Sebastian	Nicholas	Jonathan Hyde	Nicholas is a widowed client of Sebastian.	United Kingdom, Finland, Belgium	
2024	Smile 2	Joshua	Miles Gutierrez-Riley	Joshua is Elizabeth and Skye's assistant.	United States	
2024	Stress Positions	Terry Goon	John Early	Bahlul recovers from a broken leg while quarantining with his uncle Terry.	United States	
2024	Three Kilometres to the End of the World	Adi	Ciprian Chiujdea	Adi is a 17-year-old boy whose homosexuality conflicts with the fundamentalist views of his Romanian village.	Romania	
2024	Viet and Nam	Nam	Pham Thanh Hai	Viet and Nam are two coalminers in rural Vietnam who begin a relationship.	Vietnam, Philippines, Singapore, France, Netherlands, Italy, Germany, United States	
2024	Viet and Nam	Viet	Dao Duy Bao Dinh	Viet and Nam are two coalminers in rural Vietnam who begin a relationship.	Vietnam, Philippines, Singapore, France, Netherlands, Italy, Germany, United States	
2024	Young Hearts	Alexander	Marius De Saeger	14-year-old Elias befriends his new neighbour Alexander, a confident and openly gay boy from Brussels. As their friendship deepens, he realizes he has fallen in love with Alexander. With the emotional support of his grandfather and mother, Elias begins to discover his true nature and sexuality.	Belgium, Netherlands	
2024	Young Hearts	Elias	Lou Goossens	14-year-old Elias befriends his new neighbour Alexander, a confident and openly gay boy from Brussels. As their friendship deepens, he realizes he has fallen in love with Alexander. With the emotional support of his grandfather and mother, Elias begins to discover his true nature and sexuality.	Belgium, Netherlands	

== 2025–2029 ==
List
Year	Title	Character(s)	Actor	Notes	Country	Ref(s)
2025	Blue Moon	Lorenz Hart	Ethan Hawke	Hart is Richard Rodgers' former creative partner struggling with alcoholism and depression.	United States	
2025	The Choral	Robert	Robert Emms	Robert is navigating love and defiance, alongside Dr. Guthrie.	United Kingdom	
2025	Companion	Eli	Harvey Guillén	Eli and Patrick are dating.	United States	
2025	Companion	Patrick	Lukas Gage	Eli and Patrick are dating.	United States	
2025	The History of Sound	Lionel	Paul Mescal	Lionel and David met in 1917 while attending the Boston Music Conservatory, and after the World War I traveled together recording folk songs of their countrymen in rural Maine in the summer of 1920.	United States, United Kingdom	
2025	The History of Sound	Lionel	Chris Cooper	Lionel and David met in 1917 while attending the Boston Music Conservatory, and after the World War I traveled together recording folk songs of their countrymen in rural Maine in the summer of 1920.	United States, United Kingdom	
2025	The History of Sound	David	Josh O'Connor	Lionel and David met in 1917 while attending the Boston Music Conservatory, and after the World War I traveled together recording folk songs of their countrymen in rural Maine in the summer of 1920.	United States, United Kingdom	
2025	Honey Don't!	Mr. Siegfried	Billy Eichner	Mr. Siegfried is one of Honey's cilents who is obsessed with trying to figure out if his boyfriend is cheating on him.	United States, United Kingdom	
2025	Honey Don't!	Colligan	Christian Antidormi	Mr. Siegfried is one of Honey's cilents who is obsessed with trying to figure out if his boyfriend is cheating on him.	United States, United Kingdom	
2025	Is This Thing On?	Stephen	Sean Hayes	Stephen and Geoffrey are newlyweds.	United States	
2025	Is This Thing On?	Geoffrey	Scott Icenogle	Stephen and Geoffrey are newlyweds.	United States	
2025	Jimpa	Jimpa	John Lithgow	Jimpa is the grandfather of Frances who lives in Amsterdam.	Australia, Finland, Netherlands	
2025	Kiss of the Spider Woman	Luis Molina/ Kendall Nesbitt	Tonatiuh	Molina is a hairdresser who is serving an eight-year sentence for allegedly corrupting a minor in a 1981 Argentinian prison during the Dirty War.	United States	
2025	Magic Farm	Justin	Joe Apollonio	Justin is the sound guy of the film crew who has a crush on the inn receptionist.	Argentina, United States	
2025	Maintenance Required	Jordan	Matteo Lane	Jordan is Beau's best friend.	United States	
2025	Maspalomas	Vicente	José Ramón Soroiz	Vicente is an openly gay older man who is forced to enter a conservative nursing home after a stroke.	Spain	
2025	My Oxford Year	Charlie Butler	Harry Trevaldwyn	Charlie is a student at Oxford and friend of Anna and Jamie.	United States, United Kingdom	
2025	Night Stage	Matias	Gabriel Faryas	The actor Matias and the closeted politician Rafael discover their fetish of having sex in public places.	Brazil	
2025	Night Stage	Rafael	Cirillo Luna	The actor Matias and the closeted politician Rafael discover their fetish of having sex in public places.	Brazil	
2025	On the Road	Veneto	Victor Prieto	Veneto is a young hustler with a tragic backstory who trades sexual favors to truckers in exchange for money.	Mexico	
2025	Outerlands	Emile	Daniel K. Isaac	Emile is Cass' friend who implores them to join him at various queer nights at local bars.	United States	
2025	The Parenting	Rohan	Nik Dodani	Rohan and Josh are a couple who invite their parents for a weekend retreat at a countryside rental.	United States	
2025	The Parenting	Josh	Brandon Flynn	Rohan and Josh are a couple who invite their parents for a weekend retreat at a countryside rental.	United States	
2025	Peter Hujar's Day	Peter Hujar	Ben Whishaw	Hujar is recognized as a major American photographer of the 1970s and 80s, best known for his black-and-white portraits.	United States	
2025	Pillion	Colin	Harry Melling	Colin enters into a BDSM relationship with a biker gang leader.	United Kingdom	
2025	Plainclothes	Lucas	Tom Blyth	Lucas is an undercover officer tasked with entrapping and apprehending gay men, only to find himself drawn to one of his targets, Andrew.	United States	
2025	Plainclothes	Andrew	Russell Tovey	Lucas is an undercover officer tasked with entrapping and apprehending gay men, only to find himself drawn to one of his targets, Andrew.	United States	
2025	Strange River	Dídac	Jan Monter	Teenage Dídac experiences his sexual awakening after he meets a boy swimming in the Danube river during a cycling trip with his family.	Spain, Germany	
2025	The Threesome	Greg Demopolis	Jaboukie Young-White	Greg is Connor's best friend, who tells Connor's story with Olivia and Jenny during his wedding toast at the end of the movie.	United States	
2025	Together	Jamie McCabe	Damon Herriman	Jamie is Millie's neighbor and fellow teacher.	Australia, United States	
2025	Touch Me	Craig	Jordan Gavaris	Jordan is Joey's best and codependent friend.	United States	
2025	Twinless	Dennis	James Sweeney	Dennis is a gay man that befriends Roman, the protagonist, in a support group.	United States	
2025	Twinless	Rocky	Dylan O'Brien	Rocky is Roman's brother and a former sexual partner of Dennis.	United States	
2025	Weapons	Marcus Miller	Benedict Wong	Miller is the principal of the school the missing children attends. He is married to a man named Terry.	United States	
2025	Weapons	Terry	Clayton Farris	Miller is the principal of the school the missing children attends. He is married to a man named Terry.	United States	
2025	The Wedding Banquet	Min	Han Gi-chan	Min is in a relationship with Chris but not out to his wealthy family. When his grandmother tells him he must return to South Korea and join the family business, a mutually beneficial agreement is entered into with his lesbian friend Angela: a marriage of convenience that will make Min eligible for a green card, allowing him to remain in the United States, in exchange for funding her partner's fertility treatments (Remake of the 1993 film of the same name.)	United States	
2025	The Wedding Banquet	Chris	Bowen Yang	Min is in a relationship with Chris but not out to his wealthy family. When his grandmother tells him he must return to South Korea and join the family business, a mutually beneficial agreement is entered into with his lesbian friend Angela: a marriage of convenience that will make Min eligible for a green card, allowing him to remain in the United States, in exchange for funding her partner's fertility treatments (Remake of the 1993 film of the same name.)	United States	
2026	Bitter Christmas	Raúl	Leonardo Sbaraglia	Raúl is an aging filmmaker who has a younger partner named Santi.	Spain	
2026	Bitter Christmas	Santi	Quim Gutiérrez	Raúl is an aging filmmaker who has a younger partner named Santi.	Spain	
2026	Black Church Bay	Barry	Tom Cullen	Jasper is a sixth form student who spends a weekend sailing around Church Bay with his teacher and secret lover, Barry, but mysteriously disappears.	United Kingdom	
2026	Black Church Bay	Jasper	Joe Locke	Jasper is a sixth form student who spends a weekend sailing around Church Bay with his teacher and secret lover, Barry, but mysteriously disappears.	United Kingdom	
2026	Bookends	Nate	Noam Ash	Nate is the grandson of a Holocaust survivor, whom he moves in with after a breakup. Daniel is his love interest.	United States	
2026	Bookends	Dr. Daniel Green	Charlie Bennett	Nate is the grandson of a Holocaust survivor, whom he moves in with after a breakup. Daniel is his love interest.	United States	
2026	Club Kid	Peter	Jordan Firstman	Peter is a washed-up underground party promoter, whose life takes an unexpected turn when he is forced to care for Arlo, a 10-year-old son he never knew he had.	United States	
2026	Dust	Geert	Arieh Worthalter	Geert is Belgium pinup boy of tech innovation during the 1990's.	Belgium, France, United Kingdom, Greece	
2026	I Want Your Sex	Zap	Mason Gooding	Zap is Elliot's co-worker.	United States	
2026	In a Whisper	Daly	Unknown	The protagonist's Tunisian uncle who dies after hiding his sexuality for his whole life.	France, Tunisia	
2026	La bola negra	Alberto	Carlos González	Alberto is a student and failed playwright doing postgraduate research into queer identities and transgressive themes in the popular music of the 1920s	Spain, France	
2026	Leviticus	Naim	Joe Bird	Naim and Ryan are two outed boys trying to escape a violent entity that takes the form of the person they desire most.	Australia	
2026	Leviticus	Ryan	Stacy Clausen	Naim and Ryan are two outed boys trying to escape a violent entity that takes the form of the person they desire most.	Australia	
2026	The Man I Love	Jimmy George	Rami Malek	George is a celebrated theater actor working on a new project, who is slowly dying of AIDS complications. He lives with longterm boyfriend Dennis.	United States, France	
2026	The Man I Love	Dennis	Tom Sturridge	George is a celebrated theater actor working on a new project, who is slowly dying of AIDS complications. He lives with longterm boyfriend Dennis.	United States, France	
2026	Miss You, Love You	Jamie Simms	Andrew Rannells	Jamie is the assistant of Diane's late estranged son Tyler. He has conflicted feelings for Tyler stem from his own traumatic history of growing up gay. He came out later in life and has unrequited feelings for his boss.	United States	
2026	The Moment	Lloyd Randall	Isaac Powell	Lloyd is one of the "yes people" in Charli's life.	United Kingdom, United States	
2026	Remarkably Bright Creatures	Simon Brinks	Chris William Martin	Brinks is the supposed father of Cassmore.	United States	
2026	Roommates	Alex Weisz	Aidan Langford	Alex is Devon's closeted younger brother.	United States	
2026	Stop! That! Train!	Business Person	Jesse Tyler Ferguson	A mean gay man on the train. (Ferguson is one of several cameos in the film.)	United States	
2026	We're Nothing at All	Fai	Anson Kong	Fai and Ike are a couple facing severe abuse, poverty, and homophobia.	Hong Kong	
2026	We're Nothing at All	Ike	Ansonbean	Fai and Ike are a couple facing severe abuse, poverty, and homophobia.	Hong Kong	

== See also ==
- List of films featuring gay bathhouses
- List of gay characters in television
- List of LGBT-related films
- List of LGBT-related films by year
