= Wunderschön =

2022 German film

- Theatrical release poster
- Directed by: Karoline Herfurth
- Written by: Monika Fässler; Karoline Herfurth; Lena Stahl
- Produced by: Lothar Hellinger; Christopher Doll
- Starring: Karoline Herfurth; Nora Tschirner
- Cinematography: Daniel Gottschalk
- Edited by: Linda Bosch
- Music by: Annette Focks
- Production companies: Hellinger / Doll Filmproduktion; Warner Bros. Film Productions Germany
- Distributed by: Warner Bros. Pictures
- Release date: 3 February 2022
- Running time: 132 minutes
- Country: Germany
- Language: German
- Box office: $16 million

Wunderschön (English: Wonderfully Beautiful) is a 2022 German comedy-drama anthology film directed by Karoline Herfurth who also stars in the film.

A sequel, Wunderschöner was released in 2025.

== Plot ==
Five women of different ages are having a difficult time trying to match the image they want to create of themselves.

== Cast ==
- Karoline Herfurth as Sonja
- Nora Tschirner as Vicky
- Dilara Aylin Ziem as Leyla
- Emilia Schüle as Julie Abeck
- Martina Gedeck as Frauke Abeck
- Joachim Król as Wolfgang Abeck
- Friedrich Mücke as Milan
