= List of 2025 box office number-one films in Germany =

The following is a list of 2025 box office number-one films in Germany.

#	Weekending on	Film	Box office in €Weekend	Notes
1	5 January 2025	Mufasa: The Lion King	€4,473,738	
2	12 January 2025	Mufasa: The Lion King	€2,423,812	
3	19 January 2025	Mufasa: The Lion King	€1,888,487	
4	26 January 2025	The Three ??? and the Carpathian Dog	€1,874,760	
5	2 February 2025	Paddington in Peru	€2,383,406	
6	9 February 2025	Paddington in Peru	€2,014,619	
7	16 February 2025	Captain America: Brave New World	€3,280,894	#2 Wunderschöner
8	23 February 2025	Wunderschöner	€1,903,223	
9	2 March 2025	Bridget Jones: Mad About the Boy	€1.501.407	
10	9 March 2025	Bridget Jones: Mad About the Boy	€1.107.008	
11	16 March 2025	Bridget Jones: Mad About the Boy	€1.068.878	
12	23 March 2025	Snow White	€1.789.186	
13	30 March 2025	Snow White	€1.357.778	
14	6 April 2025	A Minecraft Movie	€8.893.710	
15	13 April 2025	A Minecraft Movie	€5.909.557	
16	20 April 2025	A Minecraft Movie	€4.372.323	
17	27 April 2025	Star Wars: Episode III – Revenge of the Sith	€4.438.922	
18	4 May 2025	Thunderbolts*	€2.636.933	
19	11 May 2025	Thunderbolts*	€1.534.270	
20	18 May 2025	Final Destination 6	€1.632.523	
21	25 May 2025	Lilo & Stitch	€7.461.465	
22	1 June 2025	Lilo & Stitch	€6.613.664	
23	8 June 2025	Lilo & Stitch	€3.990.317	
24	15 June 2025	How to Train Your Dragon	€2.209.295	
25	22 June 2025	How to Train Your Dragon	€2.209.295	
26	29 June 2025	F1	€2.518.657	
27	6 July 2025	Jurassic World Rebirth	€5.998.802	
28	13 July 2025	Jurassic World Rebirth	€4.344.707	
29	20 July 2025	Jurassic World Rebirth	€2.664.296	
30	27 July 2025	The Fantastic 4: First Steps	€2.557.768	
31	3 August 2025	Jurassic World Rebirth	€2.181.154	
32	10 August 2025	Weapons	€941.878	
33	17 August 2025	Das Kanu des Manitu	€8.383.976	
34	24 August 2025	Das Kanu des Manitu	€8.053.065	
35	31 August 2025	Das Kanu des Manitu	€5.850.175	
36	7 September 2025	The Conjuring: Last Rites	€4.191.400	
37	14 September 2025	Das Kanu des Manitu	€2.992.815	
38	21 September 2025	Demon Slayer: Kimetsu no Yaiba – The Movie: Infinity Castle	€7.147.335	
39	28 September 2025	Die Schule der magischen Tiere 4	€4.021.468	
40	5 October 2025	Die Schule der magischen Tiere 4	€4.925.781	
41	12 October 2025	Die Schule der magischen Tiere 4	€2.340.724	
42	19 October 2025	Die Schule der magischen Tiere 4	€1.984.837	
43	26 October 2025	Die Schule der magischen Tiere 4	€1.965.825	
44	2 November 2025	Pumuckl und das große Missverständnis	€1.783.370	
45	9 November 2025	Pumuckl und das große Missverständnis	€1.709.805	
46	16 November 2025	Pumuckl und das große Missverständnis	€1.032.553	
47	23 November 2025	Wicked: For Good	€2.931.808	
48	30 November 2025	Zootopia 2	€6.678.919	
49	7 December 2025	Zootopia 2	€5.483.399	
50	14 December 2025	Zootopia 2	€4.189.953	
51	21 December 2025	Avatar: Fire and Ash	€13.604.289	

== Highest-grossing ==
International film German film

Highest-grossing films of 2025 (In-year release)
Rank	Title	Distributor	Domestic gross
1	Avatar: Fire and Ash	Disney	$96,345,000
2	Das Kanu des Manitu	Constantin Film	$57,487,824
3	Zootopia 2	Universal	$52,996,000
4	A Minecraft Movie	Warner Bros.	$40,086,292
5	Lilo & Stitch	Disney	$36,494,349
6	Jurassic World Rebirth	Universal	$34,176,055
7	Die Schule der magischen Tiere 4	Leonine Studios	$27,424,490
8	Mission: Impossible - The Final Reckoning	Paramount Pictures International	$19,747,882
9	Paddington in Peru	StudioCanal	$14,095,302
10	The Three ??? and the Carpathian Dog	Sony Pictures Releasing	$10,155,125

== See also ==
- 2025 in Germany
- 2025 in film
- List of German films of 2025

Preceded by 2024 Box office number-one films	Box office number-one films 2025	Succeeded by 2026 Box office number-one films
