= SMS für Dich =

- Theatrical release poster
- Directed by: Karoline Herfurth
- Written by: Andrea Willson; Malte Welding; Karoline Herfurth; Sophie Kluge; Anike Decker
- Based on: SMS für Dich by Sofie Cramer
- Produced by: Lothar Hellinger; Christopher Doll
- Starring: Karoline Herfurth; Friedrich Mücke; Nora Tschirner; Frederick Lau; Katja Riemann
- Cinematography: Andreas Berger
- Edited by: Simon Gstöttmayr
- Music by: Annette Focks
- Production companies: Hellinger / Doll Filmproduktion; Warner Bros. Film Productions Germany
- Distributed by: Warner Bros. Pictures
- Release date: 15 September 2016
- Running time: 107 minutes
- Country: Germany
- Language: German

SMS für Dich (English: Text for You) is a 2016 German romantic drama film directed and co-written by Karoline Herfurth, based on the 2009 novel of the same name by Sofie Cramer. It stars Herfurth, Friedrich Mücke, Nora Tschirner, Frederick Lau and Katja Riemann.

== Cast ==
- Karoline Herfurth - Clara
- Friedrich Mücke - Mark
- Nora Tschirner - Katja
- Frederick Lau - David
- Katja Riemann - Henriette Boot
- Enissa Amani - Niki
- Friederike Kempter - Fiona
- Samuel Finzi - Wortmann
- Uwe Preuss - Kalle
- Cordula Stratmann - Ulli Volkowitz

== Remake ==
An American remake, titled Love Again, was written and directed by James C. Strouse, and stars Priyanka Chopra, Sam Heughan, and Celine Dion. It was released on 5 May 2023.
