= List of 2024 box office number-one films in Germany =

The following is a list of 2024 box office number-one films in Germany.

#	Date	Film	Box-office gross (week-end)	Notes
1	7 January 2024	Migration	€2.743.325	
2	14 January 2024	The Beekeeper	€1.769.521	
3	21 January 2024	Anyone But You	€1.942.306	
4	28 January 2024	Anyone But You	€2.232.544	
5	4 February 2024	Anyone But You	€1,906,155	
6	11 February 2024	Eine Million Minuten	€1,545,545	
7	18 February 2024	Eine Million Minuten	€1,441,947	
8	25 February 2024	Eine Million Minuten	€1,160,736	
9	3 March 2024	Dune: Part Two	€7,487,525	
10	10 March 2024	Dune: Part Two	€6,108,911	
11	17 March 2024	Dune: Part Two	€4,510,088	
12	24 March 2024	Dune: Part Two	€3,275,943	
13	31 March 2024	Chantal im Märchenland	€5,919,337	
14	7 April 2024	Chantal im Märchenland	€3.938.877	
15	14 April 2024	Chantal im Märchenland	€2.406.200	
16	21 April 2024	Chantal im Märchenland	€3.012.528	
17	28 April 2024	Chantal im Märchenland	€1.295.538	
18	5 May 2024	The Fall Guy	€1.323.012	
19	12 May 2024	The Garfield Movie	€1.360.084	
20	19 May 2024	The Garfield Movie	€1.150.501	
21	26 May 2024	The Garfield Movie	€850.009	
22	2 June 2024	The Garfield Movie	€1.827.705	
23	9 June 2024	Bad Boys: Ride or Die	€2.892.981	
24	16 June 2024	Inside Out 2	€7.371.344	
25	23 June 2024	Inside Out 2	€6.659.495	
26	30 June 2024	Inside Out 2	€4.917.845	
27	4 July 2024	Inside Out 2	€4.349.692	
28	11 July 2024	Despicable Me 4	€6.508.728	
29	18 July 2024	Despicable Me 4	€3.640.207	
30	25 July 2024	Deadpool & Wolverine	€7.143.814	
31	1 August 2024	Deadpool & Wolverine	€5.934.472	
32	8 August 2024	Deadpool & Wolverine	€3.880.250	
33	15 August 2024	It Ends with Us	€3.519.289	
34	22 August 2024	It Ends with Us	€2.328.870	
35	29 August 2024	It Ends with Us	€1.491.074	
36	5 September 2024	It Ends with Us	€1.335.500	
37	12 September 2024	Beetlejuice Beetlejuice	€1.682.225	
38	19 September 2024	Beetlejuice Beetlejuice	€1.011.464	
39	26 September 2024	Die Schule der magischen Tiere 3	€3.863.755	
40	3 October 2024	Die Schule der magischen Tiere 3	€4.612.763	
41	10 October 2024	Die Schule der magischen Tiere 3	€2.429.807	
42	17 October 2024	Die Schule der magischen Tiere 3	€1.911.547	
43	24 October 2024	Venom: The Last Dance	€3.799.199	
44	31 October 2024	Venom: The Last Dance	€3.392.717	
45	7 November 2024	Venom: The Last Dance	€1.851.749	
46	14 November 2024	Gladiator II	€3.708.654	
47	21 November 2024	Gladiator II	€2.491.282	
48	28 November 2024	Moana 2	€9.550.261	
49	5 December 2024	Moana 2	€6.991.162	
50	12 December 2024	Moana 2	€4.338.205	
51	19 December 2024	Mufasa: The Lion King	€4.909.603	

== Highest-grossing ==
Highest-grossing films of 2024 (In-year release)
Rank	Title	Distributor	Domestic gross
1.	Inside Out 2	Walt Disney Pictures	$56,914,837
2.	Moana 2	Walt Disney Pictures	$47,374,309
3.	Despicable Me 4	Universal Pictures International	$43,654,046
4.	Deadpool & Wolverine	Walt Disney Pictures	$41,128,265
5.	Dune: Part Two	Warner Bros	$40,099,562
6.	Mufasa: The Lion King	Walt Disney Pictures	$33,073,580
7.	Chantal im Märchenland	Constantin Film	$28,567,561
8.	[[]]	Leonine Studios	$5,701,943
9.	Bob Marley: One Love	Paramount Pictures	$4,798,136
10.	Argylle	United International Pictures	$4,032,376

== See also ==
- 2024 in Germany
- 2024 in film
- List of German films of 2024

Preceded by 2023 Box office number-one films	Box office number-one films 2024	Succeeded by 2025 Box office number-one films
