= Alexander the Great (miniseries) =

2014 German two-part documentary

- Also known as: Alexandre le Grand : de l'histoire au mythe
- German: Terra X: Alexander der Große
- Genre: Documentary
- Directed by: Christian Twente; Martin Carazo Mendez
- Country of origin: Germany
- Original language: German
- No. of series: 1
- No. of episodes: 2

Production
- Producers: ZDF; Arte; ORF
- Running time: 44 minutes
- Production company: Gruppe 5 Filmproduktion GmbH

Original release
- Network: Arte; ZDF
- Release: 25 October – 2 November 2014

Alexander the Great (German: Terra X: Alexander der Große; French: Alexandre le Grand : de l'histoire au mythe) is a 2014 documentary miniseries about Alexander the Great, a co-production of ZDF, Arte and ORF for ZDF's brand Terra X. The series premiered on 25 October 2014 on Arte as a 90-minute film, and later broadcast on ZDF as a two-part series. It has been dubbed into English and Spanish.

== Synopsis ==
Over the centuries, the myth of Alexander the Great, an illustrious conqueror of antiquity, has been enriched. History retains from him the image of a fine strategist and an ambitious monarch who managed, in little more than a decade, to constitute an immense empire going from Greece to India. But what man was he really? Based on reconstructions, the documentary attempts to unravel the legend of historical reality, looking back on Alexander's journey, from his birth in 356 ʙᴄ to his presumably illness-related death in 323 ʙᴄ.

== Cast ==
- David Schütter as Alexander the Great
- Vladi Georgiev as child Alexander
- Sascha Tschorn as Hephaestion
- Teodora Duhovnikova as Olympias
- Andrei Slabakov as Philip II of Macedon
- Stoyan Aleksiev as Aristotle
- Vladislav Violinov as Philotas
- Alexander Demandt as himself
- Hans-Joachim Gehrke as himself
- Tanja Scheer as herself

== Episodes ==
No. overall	No. in season	Title	Original title	Original release date
1	1	"The Path to Power"	Auf dem Weg zur Macht	26 October 2014
Alexander's childhood and how he becomes king of Macedon.
2	2	"Until the End of the World"	Bis ans Ende der Welt	2 November 2014
Alexander defeats Darius III and begins the conquest of Asia.

== Production ==
The shooting started on 21 February 2014 and ended on 17 June of the same year. Filming locations took place in Greece, Iran, and a studio in Bulgaria.
