= Soloalbum =

- Directed by: Gregor Schnitzler
- Starring: Matthias Schweighöfer; Nora Tschirner
- Release date: 27 March 2003
- Running time: 1h 29min
- Country: Germany
- Language: German

Soloalbum is a 2003 German comedy film based on the eponymous novel by Benjamin von Stuckrad-Barre.

== Cast ==
- Matthias Schweighöfer – Ben
- Nora Tschirner – Katharina
- Oliver Wnuk – Alf
- Christian Näthe – Christian
- Lisa Maria Potthoff – Nadja
- Leander Haußmann – Chefredakteur
- Matthias Matschke – Klaus
- Sandy Mölling – Anastacia
- Thomas D – Thomas D
- Julia Dietze – Franziska
- Wanda Perdelwitz – Madonna
- Thorsten Feller – Frederick Unger
