= David Schütter =

German actor (born 1991)

- Born: David Schütter-Wieske; 1991 (age 34–35); Hamburg, Germany
- Education: Schule für Schauspiel Hamburg
- Occupation: Actor
- Years active: 2008–present
- Relatives: Friedrich Schütter (grandfather)

David Schütter (born David Schütter-Wieske in 1991) is a German actor who has appeared in numerous films, television series and theatres. He is known for his portrayal of Pepe in Strawberry Bubblegums, Adrian Schimmel in Never Look Away, Ralph in Charlie's Angels and Folkwin Wolfspeer in Barbarians.

== Career ==
Born in Hamburg, a city in Northern Germany, David Schütter is grandson of the German actor Friedrich Schütter. He studied acting in Schule für Schauspiel Hamburg between 2009 and 2012. Before the school, he had already made his screen debut in the NDR series Die Pfefferkörner in 2008, following another appearance in Da kommt Kalle, in 2010. In 2011, he had a supporting role in the ZDF crime detective series Stubbe – Von Fall zu Fall, and another supporting role in Küstenwache in 2012.

Shortly after graduation, Schütter made his film debut in Gaming Instinct, in 2013. From 2013 to 2014 he portrayed more than 13 roles in various series, among which are Alles Klara, Marie Brand, Cologne P.D., In aller Freundschaft, Tatort, Großstadtrevier and Der Lehrer. In the last one, together with Hendrik Duryn, he played the role of a problem student named Florian Klosterkämper. He was cast in the title role of the 2014 documentary miniseries Alexander the Great, whom he played 'in a dramatic exaggeration, spitting out the big notes instead of articulating them'. He also played the lead role in the 41-minute short film Porn Punk Poetry (2014). With tattoos, bleached hair and mohawk, he embodied the 27-year-old Damon, who works as a male prostitute, but is now too old for this gay scene and is at a turning point in his life when he meets the young Russian Emma. Schütter represented 'a soul between hardship and romance'. The same year he starred in the award-winning drama film We Are Young. We Are Strong, as neo-Nazi Sandro.

Following some guest and supporting roles in Letzte Spur Berlin (2015), Alarm für Cobra 11 – Die Autobahnpolizei (2015), Weinberg (2015), Offline: Are You Ready for the Next Level? (2016), Der Kriminalist (2017), Rübezahls Schatz (2017) and Right Here Right Now (2018), Schütter starred in the second season of 4 Blocks as Matthias Keil, one of the leading roles. In the 2019 two-part television thriller Walpurgisnacht – Die Mädchen und der Tod, he embodied the amateur photographer Alexander Zimmermann, who is suspected of being a possible misogynist.

In 2020, Schütter was featured in the film Persian Lessons, the miniseries Unsere wunderbaren Jahre and the Netflix historical series Barbarians.

== Filmography ==
=== Film ===
Year	Title	Role	Notes
2013	Gaming Instinct	Grüttel	
2014	Porn Punk Poetry	Damon	Short film
2014	We Are Young. We Are Strong	Sandro	
2016	Offline: Are You Ready for the Next Level?	Ben	
2016	Unsere Zeit ist jetzt	Dawid	
2016	Heart of Stone	Bastian	
2016	Strawberry Bubblegums	Pepe	
2017	Rübezahls Schatz	Erik	TV film
2017	Der Reichstag – Geschichte eines deutschen Hauses	Ferdinand Hardekopf	Docudrama
2018	Right Here Right Now	Pablo	
2018	Never Look Away	Adrian Schimmel	
2018	Klassentreffen 1.0	Karsten	
2018	The Keeper	Richard Holthaus	
2019	Sweethearts	Charlie	
2019	Charlie's Angels	Ralph	
2020	Persian Lessons	Paul	
2025	The Tank	Lieutenant Philip Gerkens	
2026	Ghost Song		

=== Television ===
Year	Title	Role	Notes
2008	Die Pfefferkörner		2 episodes
2010	Da kommt Kalle		Episode: "Baby an Bord"
2011	Stubbe – Von Fall zu Fall		Episode: "Der Stolz der Familie"
2012	Küstenwache		Episode: "Unter dem Totenkopf"
2013	In aller Freundschaft		Episode: "Überdruck"
2013	Alles Klara	Oscar Banks	Episode: "Laubenpieper"
2013	Großstadtrevier		Episode: "Der zweite Mann"
2013	Tatort: Feuerteufel	Kollege von Ruben	
2013	Der Lehrer	Florian Klosterkämper	Episode: "Wieder so ein fieser Vollmer-Trick"
2014	Marie Brand		Episode: "Marie Brand und das Mädchen im Ring"
2014	Tatort: Kopfgeld	Lubo	
2014	Cologne P.D.		Episode: "Eine Frage der Gerechtigkeit"
2014	Alexander the Great	Alexander the Great	Docudrama; leading role
2014	Josephine Klick – Allein unter Cops	Ewald Persike	6 episodes
2015	Weinberg	Ulf	
2015	Tatort: Der große Schmerz	Lubo	
2015	Alarm für Cobra 11 – Die Autobahnpolizei		Episode: "Angst"
2015	Tatort: Das Muli	Reimers	
2015	Letzte Spur Berlin		Episode: "Monster 1/2"
2017	Der Kriminalist		Episode: "Der verlorene Sohn"
2018	4 Blocks	Matthias Keil	Leading role in seasons 2–3
2019	Walpurgisnacht – Die Mädchen und der Tod	Alexander Zimmermann	
2019	8 Days	Robin	8 episodes
2019	Schuld nach Ferdinand von Schirach		Episode: "Der kleine Mann"
2020	Unsere wunderbaren Jahre	Tommy Weidner	3 episodes
2020	Barbarians	Folkwin Wolfspeer	11 episodes
