= Saskia Rosendahl =

German actress (born 1993)

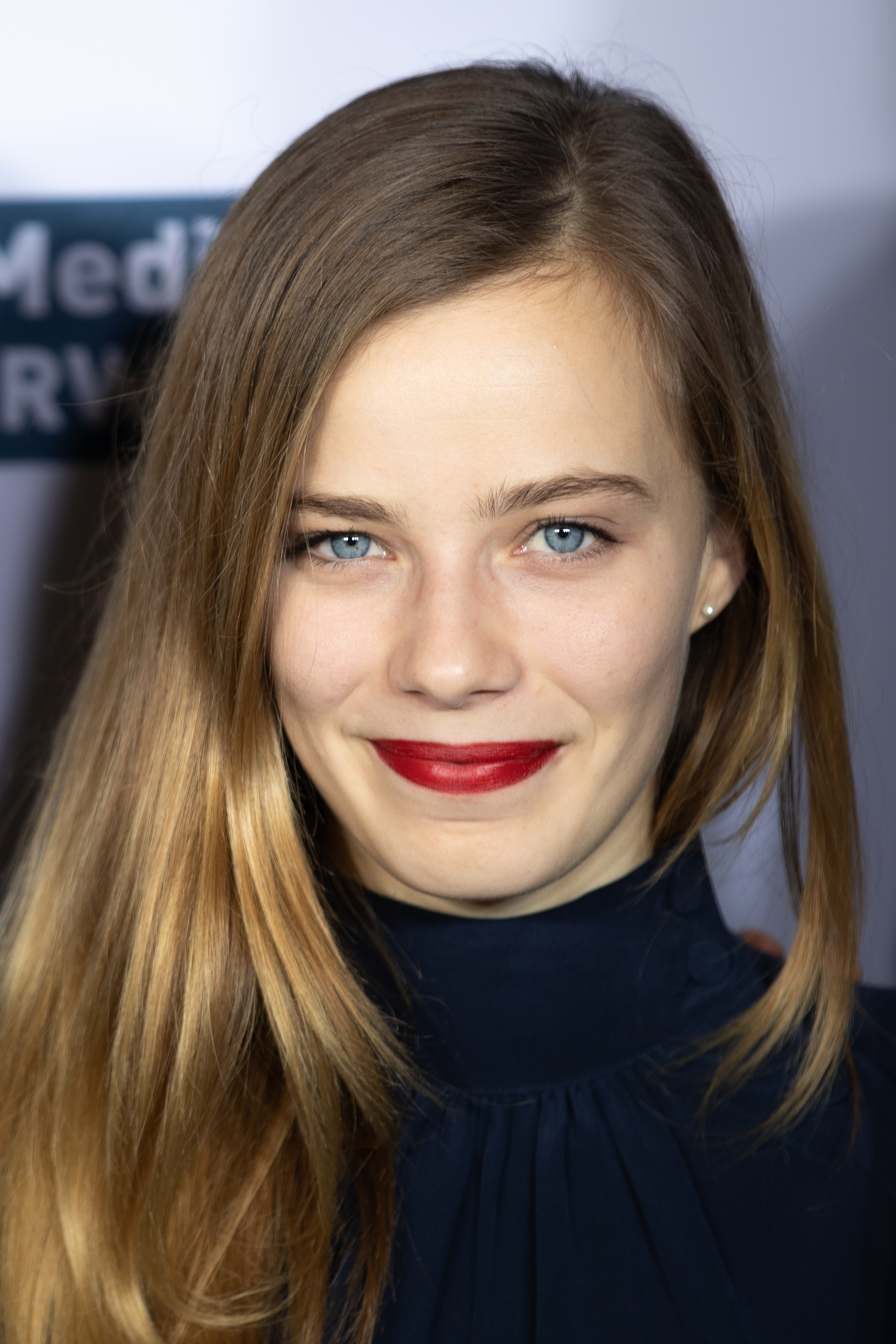
- Rosendahl in 2019
- Born: Saskia-Sophie Rosendahl; 9 July 1993 (age 32); Halle (Saale), Saxony-Anhalt, Germany
- Occupation: Actress
- Years active: 2008–present

Saskia-Sophie Rosendahl (born 9 July 1993) is a German actress. She is best known for her role in the film Lore (2012), for which she won the AACTA Award for Best Young Actor.

== Biography ==
Saskia Rosendahl began her career with the children's ballet of the Halle Opera, with which she performed various theatre appearances from 2001 to 2011. From 2008 to 2011 she worked as an actress in productions of the improvisational theatre "Kaltstart" and the New Theatre Halle. In 2010, Rosendahl made her cinema debut in Wolfgang Dinslage's film Für Elise. In 2011, while still at school, she took on the lead role in Cate Shortland's German-language anti-war drama Lore, which won the audience award at the Locarno Film Festival in 2012 and was the official Australian entry for the 2013 Academy Awards in the category “Best Foreign Language Film”. The magazine Variety praised the maturity and security of the portrayal of her complex role and called Rosendahl an "exciting new talent". At the 23rd Stockholm International Film Festival, she received the award for “Best Actress” for her role in Lore, and at the presentation of the Australian AACTA Award in 2013, she was honoured as the best young actress.

She graduated from school in 2012 and was part of the ensemble of Vivian Naefe's cinema adaptation of the book bestseller The Taste of Apple Seeds. From August to October 2012, she was directed by Denis Dercourt in a leading role in the movie A Pact in front of the camera. At the Berlinale 2013, Rosendahl was presented by the European Film Promotion as one of the ten European “Shooting Stars”. In the same year, she received a nomination for the New Faces Award for best young actress. In Lindenberg! Do your thing (2020) she plays Petra, immortalised in the song "Mädchen aus Ostberlin" by Udo Lindenberg.

== Filmography ==
Film
Year	Title	Role	Notes
2012	Für Elise	Lena	
2012	Lore	Lore	AACTA Award for Best Young Actor; Australian Film Critics Association Award for Best Actress; Berlin Film Festival Shooting Stars Award; Stockholm International Film Festival Award for Best Actress; Film Critics Circle of Australia Award for Best Performance by a Young Actor
2013	A Pact	Emelie	
2013	The Missionary	Vera	
2014	We Are Young. We Are Strong	Jenny	
2018	The Girl in the Spider's Web	Linda Ahlgren	
2018	Never Look Away	Elisabeth May	
2019	Relativity	Nora	
2020	Babylon Berlin	Malu Seegers	
2021	Fabian – Going to the Dogs	Cornelia Battenberg	
2021	No One's with the Calves	Christin	
2024	Dying	Ronja	
2024	Karigula	Rebecca	
2025	Cicadas	Isabell	It will be screened in Panorama at the 75th Berlin International Film Festival in February 2025.
