= Caroline Peters =

German actress (born 1971)

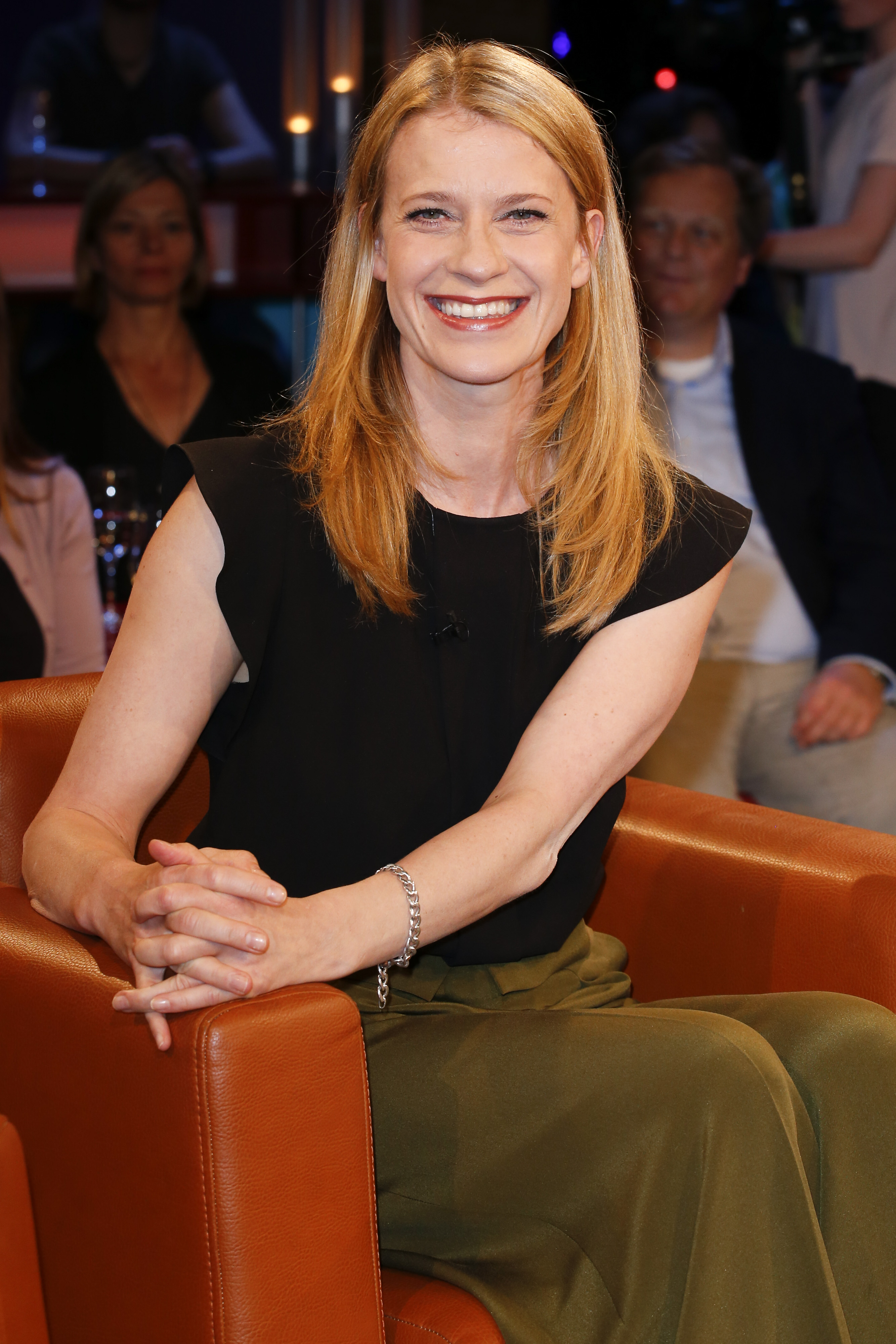
Peters in June 2016

Caroline Peters (born 1971, Mainz) is a German actress. She played Pia Himmelman in the 2004 Israeli film Walk on Water.

== Filmography ==
- Family Affairs (2022, Film) as Elisabeth Berger-Böttcher
- Dreiraumwohnung (2021, Film) as Dr. Marit Miebach
- Südpol (2019, TV Film) as Sandra Wallentin
- How About Adolf? (2018, Film) as Elisabeth Berger-Böttcher
- Womit haben wir das verdient? (2018, Film) as Wanda
- Double Room (2017, Film) as Dr. Marit Miebach
- Kalt ist die Angst (2017, TV film) as Claire Heller
- Young Light (2016, Film) as Frau Morian
- Ein Mord mit Aussicht (2015, TV film) as Sophie Haas
- Im Netz (2013, Film) as Juliane Schubert
- Sleepless (2009, TV film) as Yvonne Sagmeister
- Cutlet for Three (2009, TV film) as Eva Lorenz
- Mord mit Aussicht (TV series, 2008-2014) as Sophie Haas
- Contergan (2007, TV film) as Hanne Bauer
- November Sonne (2006)
- Arnies Welt (2005, TV film) as Hannah Bäumer
- Stromberg (TV series, 1 episode, 2005) as Kerstin Aumann
- Polizeiruf 110 (TV series, 1 episode, 2005)
- Wilsberg (TV series, 1 episode, 2005) as Susanne Diepenbrock
- Die Ärztin (2004, TV film) as Jutta Peters
- Walk on Water (2004) as Pia Himmelman
- Schöne Frauen (2004) as Kandis Zuckermann
- Tatort (TV series, 1 episode, 2003) as Katharina Stoll
- Über Nacht (2003)
- Die Affäre Semmeling (2002, TV mini-series)
- 99euro-films (segment So billig, 2001)
- Schluss mit lustig! (2001, TV film) as Connie
- Im Namen des Gesetzes (TV series, 1 episode, 1999) as Maria Schneller
- Der Pirat (1998, TV film)
- Fake Soldiers (1999) as herself

== Awards ==
- 2007: Won the Adolf Grimme Award for Arnies Welt (2005, German TV)
