= No One's with the Calves =

2021 German film

- Directed by: Sabrina Sarabi
- Starring: Saskia Rosendahl; Rick Okon
- Release date: 8 August 2021 (LFF)
- Running time: 116 minutes
- Country: Germany
- Language: German

No One's with the Calves (German: Niemand ist bei den Kälbern) is a 2021 German drama film based on the eponymous book by Alina Herbing.

== Plot ==
Christin (Saskia Rosendahl) lives with her partner Jan (Rick Okon) and his parents on a farm in Mecklenburg. She is frustrated with the life on the farm and the speechlessness that surrounds her. While out in the field she meets Klaus (Godehard Giese), a wind turbine technician.

== Cast ==
- Saskia Rosendahl - Christin
- Rick Okon - Jan
- Godehard Giese - Klaus
- Andreas Döhler - Jens
- Nico Ehrenteit - Marco
- Hendrik Heutmann - Dieter
