= Anneke Kim Sarnau =

German actress (born 1972)

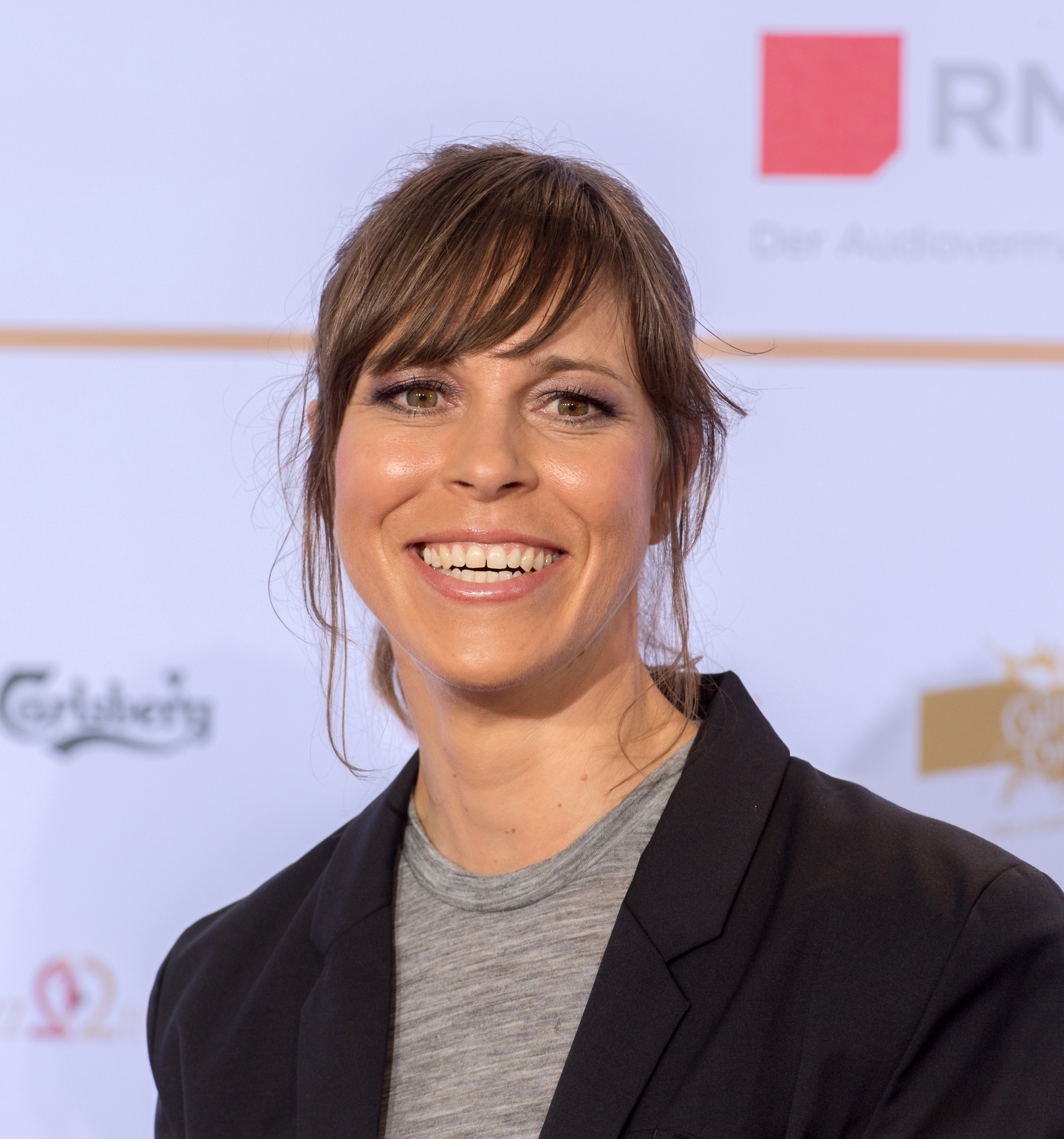
- Kim Sarnau at the Deutschen Radiopreis in 2016
- Born: 1972 (age 53–54); Klein Offenseth-Sparrieshoop, Schleswig-Holstein, West Germany
- Occupations: Theater actress; Movie actress
- Children: 2
- Awards: See Awards

Anneke Kim Sarnau (born 1972) is a German theater and movie actress living in Berlin.

== Life ==
Anneke Kim Sarnau, who comes from Klein Offenseth-Sparrieshoop, graduated from the Bismarckschule in Elmshorn and then began studying philosophy and English at the University of Kiel.

Kim Sarnau has a son born in 2011 and a daughter born in 2014.

== Filmography ==
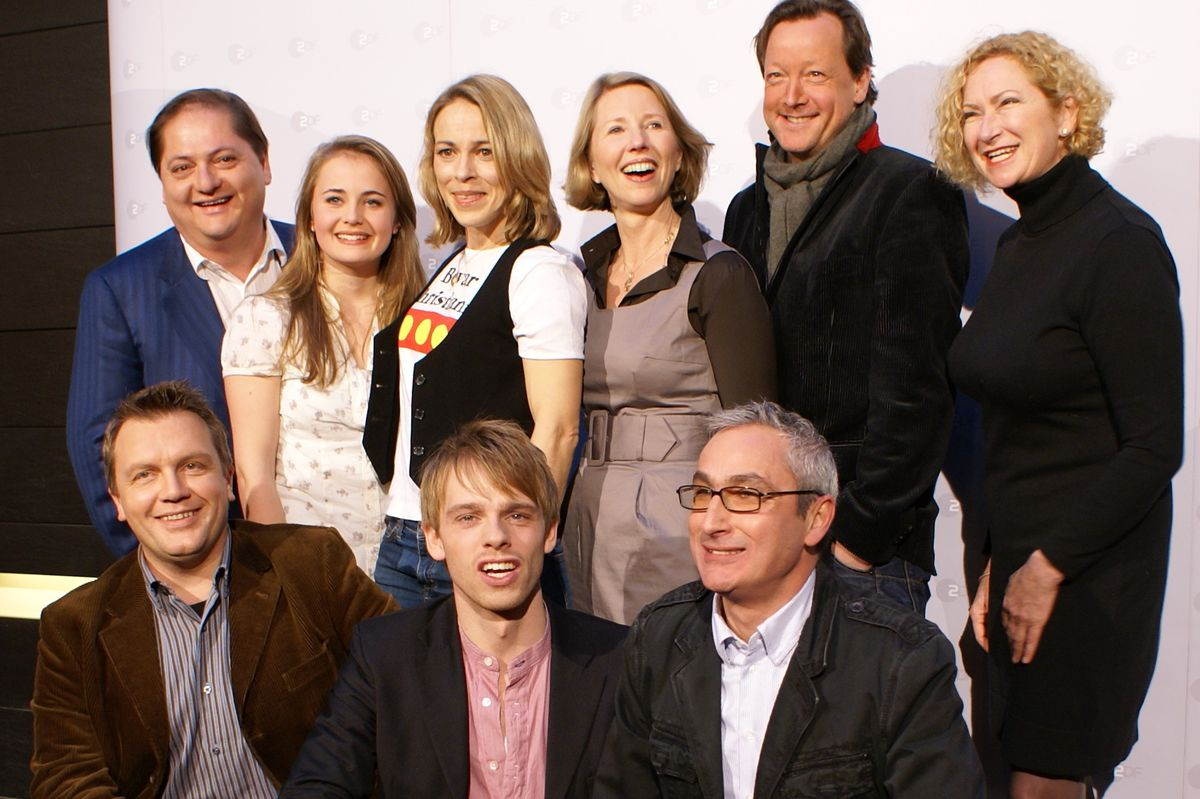
Kim Sarnau (top, third from left) with the occupation from Ein Mann, ein Fjord!

=== Cinema films ===
- 2003: They've Got Knut
- 2005: The Constant Gardener
- 2005: Fremde Haut
- 2006: FC Venus
- 2008: Up! Up! To the Sky
- 2009: Germany 09
- 2012: Pommes essen
- 2014: Honig im Kopf
- 2015: The Small and the Wicked
- 2015: 4 Kings
- 2016: Conni & Co
- 2016: Blank
- 2017: Simpel
- 2017: Rock My Heart
- 2019: Sweethearts
- 2023: Bones and Names
- 2024: A Million Minutes
- 2024: Sad Jokes
- 2025: Wunderschöner

=== TV films ===
- 2000: Vom Küssen und vom Fliegen
- 2000: Bella Block: Am Ende der Lüge
- 2000: Alarm für Cobra 11 – Die Autobahnpolizei: Schachmatt
- 2001: Ende der Saison
- 2001: Eine Hochzeit und (k)ein Todesfall
- 2002: Final Hope
- 2002: Mehr als nur Sex
- 2002: Das Duo: Totes Erbe
- 2002: Juls Freundin
- 2003: Ich liebe das Leben
- 2003: Sperling und die letzte Chance
- 2004: Kommissarin Lucas: Vertrauen bis zuletzt
- 2004: Tatort: Hundeleben
- 2005: In Sachen Kaminski
- 2005: Tatort: Am Abgrund
- 2005: Im Namen des Gesetzes: Videobeweis
- 2006: Rosa Roth: Der Tag wird kommen
- 2006: Der falsche Tod
- 2007: Prager Botschaft
- 2007–2008: Dr. Psycho – Die Bösen, die Bullen, meine Frau und ich
- 2007: Die andere Hälfte des Glücks
- 2007: Mitte 30
- 2008: Ihr könnt euch niemals sicher sein
- 2009: Ein Mann, ein Fjord!
- 2009: Die Drachen besiegen
- 2010: Ice Fever
- since 2010: Polizeiruf 110
- 2010: Tatort: Die Heilige
- 2010: Das Haus ihres Vaters
- 2011: Uns trennt das Leben
- 2013: Alles auf Schwarz – Wacken, Documentary about the Wacken Open Air
- 2013: Weit hinter dem Horizont
- 2014: Keine Zeit für Träume
- 2015: Unter Verdacht: Ein Richter
- 2015: Crossing Lines – Virus
- 2016: Couple's Retreat
- 2016: Shakespeares letzte Runde
- 2017: Getting Rid of Mum
- 2017: Götter in Weiß
- 2017: Willkommen bei den Honeckers
- 2017: Hit Mom: Murderous Christmas
- 2018: Endlich Witwer
- 2019: Das Quartett: Der lange Schatten des Todes
- 2019: The Summer After Graduation
- 2019: Käse und Blei

=== Short films ===
- 1996: Boy Meets Winona (director and script: Christian Bahlo)
- 2005: Eine einfache Liebe (director and script: Maike Mia Höhne)
- 2009: Schautag (director: Marvin Kren)
- 2016: Das Beste am Norden (director and script: Detlev Buck, Clips)

=== Voice actor roles ===
- 2011: Polizeiruf 110: Im Alter von ... (voice from Sigrid Göhler)

== Evolvements in theater ==
- 1997/1998: Alice im Wunderland, Stadttheater Klagenfurt
- 1997: Vinny, Burgtheater Wien
- 1997: Jugend ohne Gott, Burgtheater Wien
- 1997: Katzelmacher, Burgtheater Wien
- 1998: Kasimir und Karoline, Burgtheater Wien
- 1998: Die heilige Johanna der Schlachthöfe, Burgtheater Wien
- 1998: Die Riesen vom Berge, Burgtheater Wien
- 1998: Schlacht um Wien, Burgtheater Wien
- 1998: Ein Sportstück, Burgtheater Wien
- 2003/2005: Der zerbrochne Krug, Düsseldorfer Schauspielhaus
- 2004: Martha Jellnek, Hamburger Kammerspiele
- 2005/2006: Ein spanisches Stück, Deutsches Schauspielhaus Hamburg

== Audio books (selection) ==
- 2009: Tödliche Worte from Val McDermid. Random House Audio, ISBN 978-3-8371-0083-9
- 2012: Liebe Lottofee, anbei meine Zahlen für kommende Woche from Jan Hofer, gesprochen von Sarnau, Jan Hofer und Oliver Kalkofe. Random House Audio, ISBN 978-3-625-16048-9
- 2012: Tante Martha im Gepäck from Ulrike Herwig. Hörbuch Hamburg, ISBN 978-3-86909-103-7
- 2013: Das Nebelhaus von Eric Berg, voice by Sarnau and Jürgen Uter. Jumbo Neue Medien & Verlag, ISBN 978-3-8337-3222-5
- 2019: Lucy Fricke: Töchter (Betty) – director: Martin Zylka (NDR)

== Awards ==
- 2002: Adolf-Grimme-Preis with Gold for her performance in Ende der Saison
- 2002: Deutscher Fernsehpreis in the category „Beste Hauptdarstellerin“ ("Best Main Actor") for Ende der Saison and Die Hoffnung stirbt zuletzt
- 2002: Goldener Gong for Die Hoffnung stirbt zuletzt
- 2002: Special Award beim Fernsehfilmpreis der Deutschen Akademie der Darstellenden Künste for Die Hoffnung stirbt zuletzt
- 2003: Adolf-Grimme-Preis for Die Hoffnung stirbt zuletzt
- 2003: Bayerischer Fernsehpreis for Die Hoffnung stirbt zuletzt
- 2003: Lilli-Palmer-Gedächtniskamera as best young actor
- 2019: Drosteipreis, recognition award for Kulturschaffende
