= Godehard Giese =

German actor

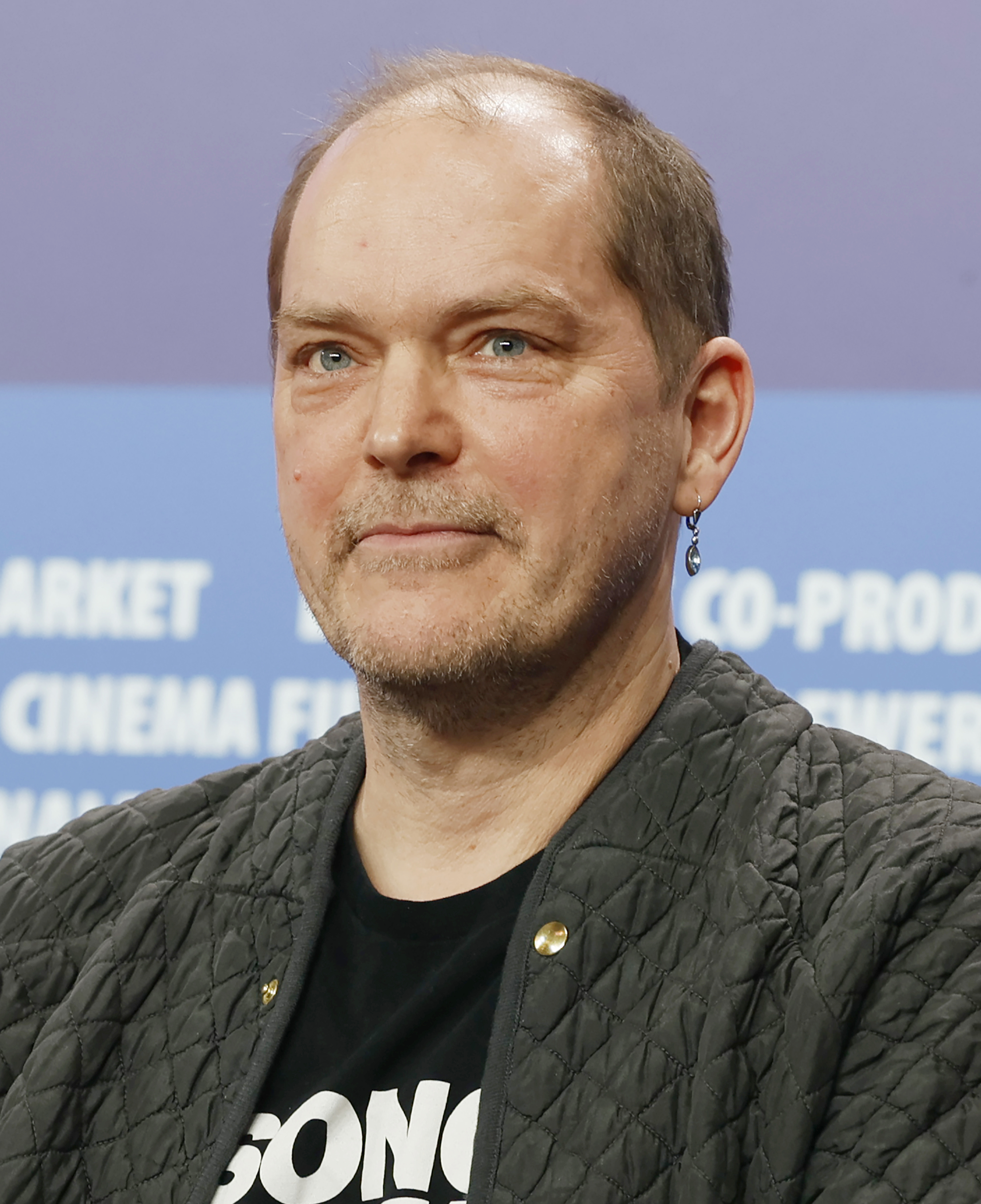
Giese in 2026

Godehard Giese (born 1972) is a German actor, known for his roles in Deutschland 83. and Babylon Berlin.

== Life ==
Giese attended Sankt-Ansgar-Schule in Hamburg in his childhood. He studied at Berlin University of the Arts from 1997 to 2000. From 2001 to 2003 he worked as an actor at a theatre in Hildesheim. He came out as gay in February 2021.

== Selected filmography ==
- Breaking Horizons (2012)
- The Book Thief (2013)
- Summers Downstairs (2015)
- A Cure for Wellness (2016)
- Alone in Berlin (2016)
- Liebmann (2016)
- Transit (2018)
- Mack the Knife: Brecht's Threepenny Film (2018)
- All My Loving (2019)
- I Was, I Am, I Will Be (2019)
- No One's with the Calves (2021)
- Bones and Names (2023)
- The Conference (2023)
- A Million Minutes (2024)
- Sad Jokes (2024)
- Wunderschöner (2025)
- Rose (2026)

== Selected television ==
- Der Kriminalist (2011)
- Deutschland 83 (2015)
- Schuld nach Ferdinand von Schirach (2015)
- Babylon Berlin (2017-)
- The Same Sky (2017)
