= Ulmens Auftrag =

- Starring: Christian Ulmen; Nora Tschirner
- Country of origin: Germany

Ulmens Auftrag is a German television series that utilized new color-enhancing "accuchrome" technology.

== See also ==
- List of German television series
