= We Are Young. We Are Strong =

2014 film

- Film poster
- German: Wir sind jung. Wir sind stark
- Directed by: Burhan Qurbani
- Written by: Martin Behnke; Burhan Qurbani
- Starring: Devid Striesow
- Production companies: UFA Fiction; ZDF; Arte
- Distributed by: UFA
- Release dates: 16 October 2014 (RFF); 22 January 2015 (Germany)
- Running time: 123 minutes
- Country: Germany
- Language: German

We Are Young. We Are Strong (German: Wir sind jung. Wir sind stark) is a 2014 German drama film directed by Burhan Qurbani, a fictionalized account of the 1992 xenophobic Rostock-Lichtenhagen riots. It was one of eight films shortlisted by Germany to be their submission for the Academy Award for Best Foreign Language Film at the 88th Academy Awards, but it lost out to Labyrinth of Lies.

== Cast ==
- Devid Striesow as Martin
- Jonas Nay as Stefan
- Trang Le Hong as Lien
- Joel Basman as Robbie
- David Schütter as Sandro
- Saskia Rosendahl as Jennie
