= Wunderschöner =

Film by Karoline Herfurth

- Theatrical release poster
- Directed by: Karoline Herfurth
- Written by: Monika Fässler; Karoline Herfurth
- Produced by: Lothar Hellinger; Christopher Doll
- Starring: Anneke Kim Sarnau; Karoline Herfurth; Emilia Schüle; Nora Tschirner
- Cinematography: Daniel Gottschalk
- Edited by: Linda Bosch
- Music by: Annette Focks
- Production companies: Hellinger / Doll Filmproduktion; Warner Bros. Film Productions Germany
- Distributed by: Warner Bros. Pictures
- Release date: 13 February 2025
- Running time: 138 minutes
- Country: Germany
- Language: German
- Box office: $14.5 million

Wunderschöner (lit.“More Beautiful”) is a 2025 German anthology film written and directed by Karoline Herfurth and co-written by Monika Fässler. It is a sequel to the 2022 film Wunderschön.

The film was released on 13 February 2025 by Warner Bros. Pictures.

== Plot ==
Nadine is determined to stay in shape, toned, and attractive. But when her husband Philipp turns to a prostitute, she plunges into a deep life crisis. What does the other woman have that she doesn't? Meanwhile, her daughter Lilly is a girl who is absorbed in her art teacher Vicky Schiller's lectures on the invisibility of ladies in history and wonders if she can even express what she doesn't want—for example, to her boyfriend Enno.

Enno is attending a course on "toxic masculinity" during the project days, led by Vicky's new colleague Trevor, who quickly piques her interest. But Vicky actually misses her partner Franz, who has retreated to the mountains indefinitely, as she's no longer sure if isolated togetherness is the right lifestyle for her. Julie also feels isolated in her new job as a production manager for a TV show.

Dealing with her overbearing colleague Paul intensifies her self-doubt: Is she really too difficult, too sensitive, too loud? But even when she raises her voice, no one seems to want to listen. Listening is also difficult for Sonja and Milan, who have since separated. They try to find common ground in family therapy, but when Sonja learns about Milan's new partner, it hits her hard. Afraid of being left alone, she ventures into dating herself – and realizes that she's looking for something completely different.

== Cast ==
- Anneke Kim Sarnau as Nadine
- Karoline Herfurth as Sonja
- Emilia Schüle as Julie
- Nora Tschirner as Vicky
- Emilia Packard as Lilly
- Friedrich Mücke as Milan
- Godehard Giese as Philipp
- Malick Bauer as Trevor
