= Ernst Stötzner =

German actor (born 1952)

- Born: 1952 (age 73–74); Frankfurt, West Germany
- Occupation: Actor
- Years active: 1983–present

Ernst Stötzner (born 1952) is a German actor, who has appeared in more than sixty films since 1983.

== Selected filmography ==
Year	Title	Role	Notes
1983	Class Enemy	Fetzer	
1989	Spider's Web		
1995	Underground	Franz	
2006	Klimt	Minister Hartl	
2010	The Coming Days		
2012	Home for the Weekend		
2016	Frantz	Dr Hans Hoffmeister	
2017	Babylon Berlin	General Major Seegers	
2017	Charité	Rudolf Virchow	
2019	Der Pass	Wolfgang Stocker	TV series
2020	Isi & Ossi	Grandpa	Movie
2023	Bones and Names	Michael	Film
