= Nora Tschirner =

German actress

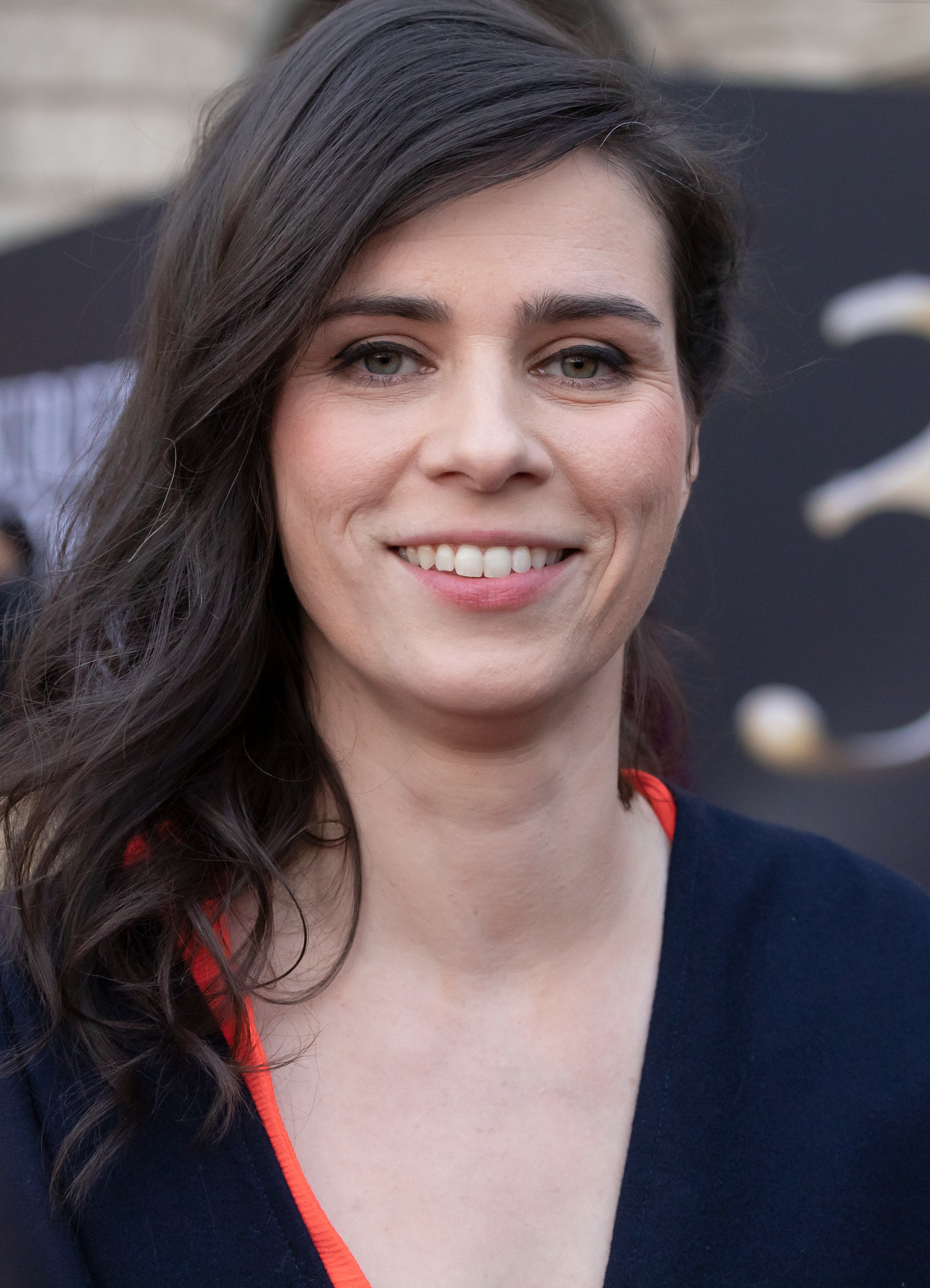
- Tschirner in 2019
- Born: Nora Marie Tschirner; 12 June 1981 (age 45); East Berlin, East Germany
- Occupation: Actress
- Years active: 2001–present

Nora Marie Tschirner (born 12 June 1981) is a German film actress, musician and former television and radio presenter.

== Early and personal life ==
Nora Tschirner was born in East Berlin (then East Germany) to the documentary film director Joachim Tschirner and the radio journalist Waltraud Tschirner. She grew up with her two older brothers in the East Berlin suburb Pankow. She attended John-Lennon-Gymnasium in Berlin, as did Sarah Kuttner, with whom she is friends. Tschirner completed her Abitur at the Rosa-Luxemburg-Oberschule in Pankow. She made her first appearance on television in 1997 with a role in the ZDF children's series Achterbahn.

Nora Tschirner has one child (born 2013), fathered by a boyfriend whose identity she has not revealed, and lives in Berlin.

== Career ==
=== Presenting ===
In 2001, she was cast as a VJ for MTV and worked for the station until 2007. In addition, she hosted the radio program "Blue Moon" on Radio Fritz (RBB) with Stephan Michme. In 2004 she appeared with Christian Ulmen in his show Ulmens Auftrag on MTV. In 2007 she hosted the First Steps Awards. She was also seen in OneRepublic's Secrets music video as the main character.

=== Acting ===
After appearing as Anya in Conny Walter's Never Mind the Wall (2001), she was the leading actress, playing Paula Behringer, in the ARD series Sternenfänger (2002). In 2003 she appeared alongside Matthias Schweighöfer as Katharina in Soloalbum, from the novel with the same title by Benjamin von Stuckrad-Barre. In 2005 she was the leading actress, playing Titzi in Anno Saul's Kebab Connection and some smaller roles in television series including Ein starkes Team and Abschnitt 40. She was the leading actress alongside Christian Ulmen in the film FC Venus. In 2006 she played in the ZDF science fiction series Ijon Tichy: Raumpilot, a filming of The Star Diaries by Stanisław Lem. It won the German Television Prize and was nominated for the Grimme-Preis. In 2007 she was the leading actress alongside Til Schweiger in the romantic comedy Keinohrhasen. For this role, she won a Bambi in the national film category in 2008. In 2012, she voiced the main role of Merida in the German dub of Brave. From 2013 to 2021, Tschirner and Christian Ulmen starred as team of investigators — who also happen to be a couple – in the Weimar-based episodes of the Tatort crime film series. In the German version of the 2013 reboot of the video game Tomb Raider, she voices the main character Lara Croft.

=== Singing ===
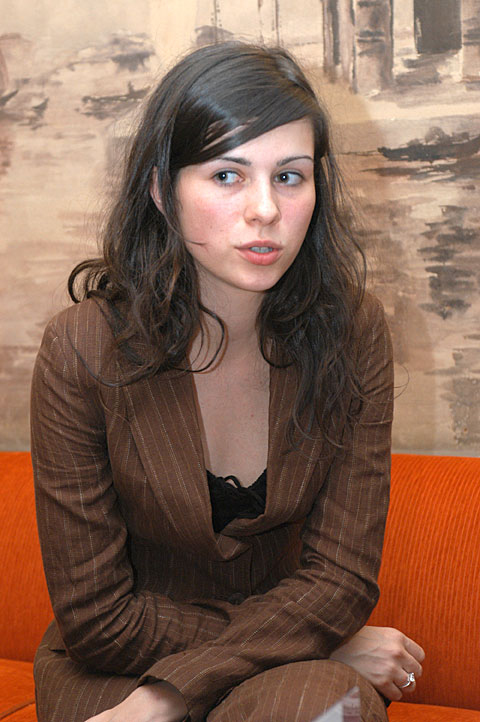
Nora Tschirner at the Premiere of Soloalbum (2003)

She participated on the songs "Das ewige Date" and "Küss mich schnell bevor Du platzt" on the album Brichst du mir das Herz, dann brech ich dir die Beine by Olli Schulz und der Hund Marie. In 2012 Nora Tschirner together with Tom Krimi and Erik Lautenschläger founded the band project "Prag". They released the "cineastic pop" album "Premiere".

== Filmography ==
=== Television ===
- 2002: Sternenfänger (series)
- 2004: Ein starkes Team: Sicherheitsstufe 1
- 2004: Ulmens Auftrag
- 2005: Nichts geht mehr (13th Street Shocking Short)
- 2006: Die ProSieben Märchenstunde, Hans im Glück as apprentice witch 'Rabea'
- 2007 & 2011: Ijon Tichy: Raumpilot (Comedy science fiction series)
- 2007: Das letzte Stück Himmel
- 2013: Tatort: Die fette Hoppe
- 2015: Tatort: Der irre Iwan
- 2016: Tatort: Der treue Roy
- 2016: Circus Halligalli
- 2017: Tatort: Der scheidende Schupo
- 2017: jerks.: Braindead
- 2017: Tatort: Der wüste Gobi
- 2018: Tatort: Der kalte Fritte
- 2018: Tatort: Die robuste Roswita
- 2019: Arthurs Gesetz (series)
- 2019: Tatort: Der höllische Heinz

=== Cinema ===
- 2001: Never Mind the Wall
- 2003: Soloalbum
- 2005: Kebab Connection
- 2006: FC Venus
- 2006: The Conclave
- 2007: Rabbits Without Ears
- 2008: La noche que dejó de llover
- 2009: The Crocodiles
- 2009: Vicky the Viking
- 2009: Mord ist mein Geschäft, Liebling
- 2009: Rabbit Without Ears 2
- 2010: The Crocodiles Strike Back
- 2010: Here Comes Lola!
- 2010: Bon Appétit
- 2011: The Crocodiles: All for One
- 2012: Offroad
- 2013: Everyone's Going to Die
- 2013: Girl on a Bicycle
- 2014: Everything Is Love
- 2016: SMS für Dich
- 2019: The Space Between the Lines
- 2022: Wunderschön (also creative producer)
- 2022: Over & Out
- 2022: Just Something Nice
- 2025: Wunderschöner
- 2025: No Hit Wonder

=== Video games ===
- 2013: Tomb Raider (German voice of Lara Croft)
- 2019: Trüberbrook

== Audiobooks ==
- 2013: Amy Silver: Du und ich und all die Jahre, publisher: Random House Audio, ISBN 978-3-8371-2503-0
- 2015: Elizabeth Little: Mördermädchen (Dear Daughter, together with Oliver Siebeck), publisher: der Hörverlag, ISBN 978-3-8445-1934-1

== Awards ==
- 2008: Bambi - film national for the performance in Keinohrhasen
- 2009: Jupiter - best actress (national) for the performance in Keinohrhasen
- 2010: GQ Woman Of The Year Award
