= Sternenfänger =

- Starring: Nora Tschirner
- Country of origin: Germany

Sternenfänger is a German television series.

== See also ==
- List of German television series
