= Karoline Herfurth =

German actress (born 1984)

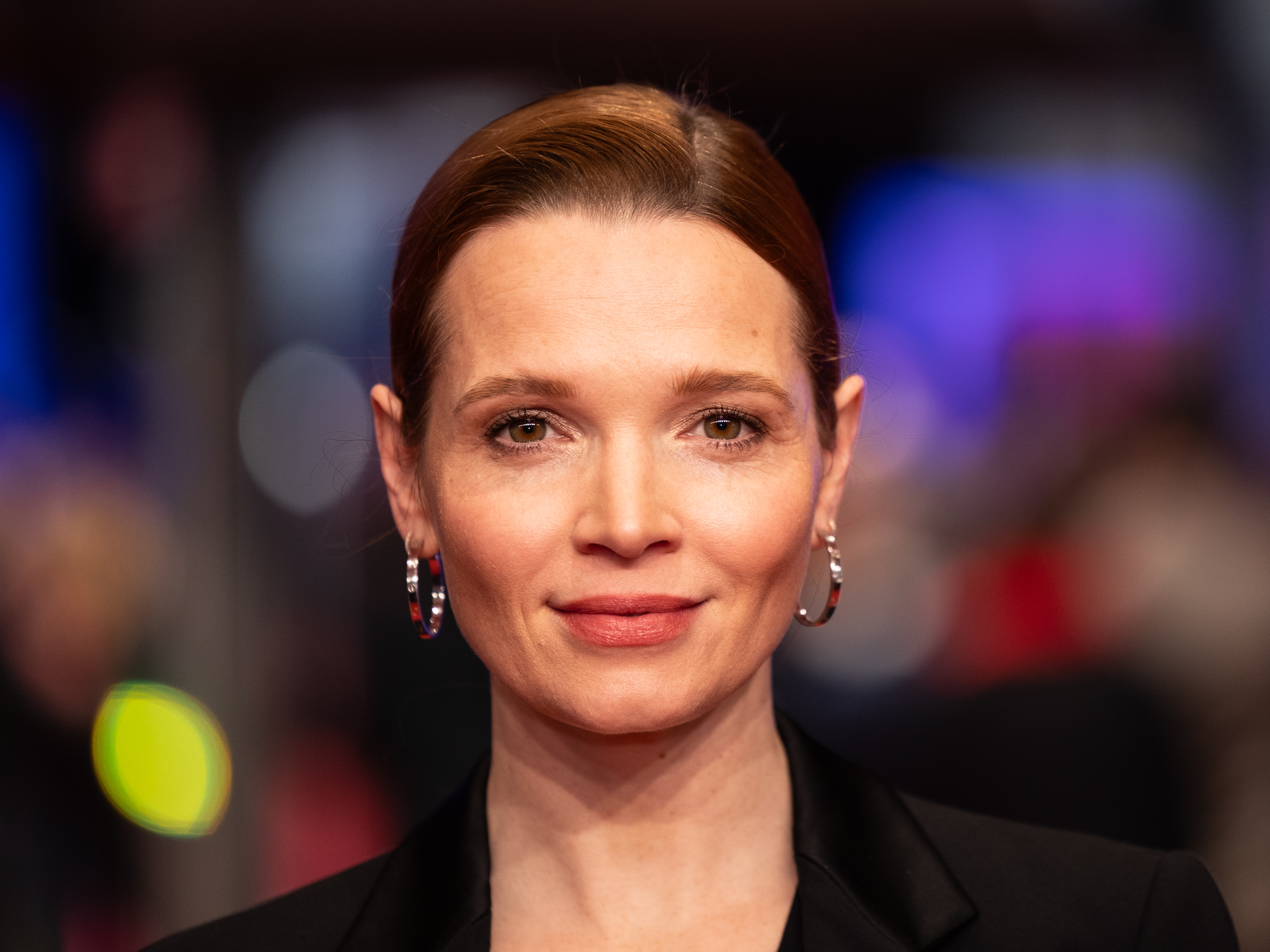
- Herfurth at the Berlinale 2024
- Born: 22 May 1984 (age 42); East Berlin, East Germany
- Occupation: Actress

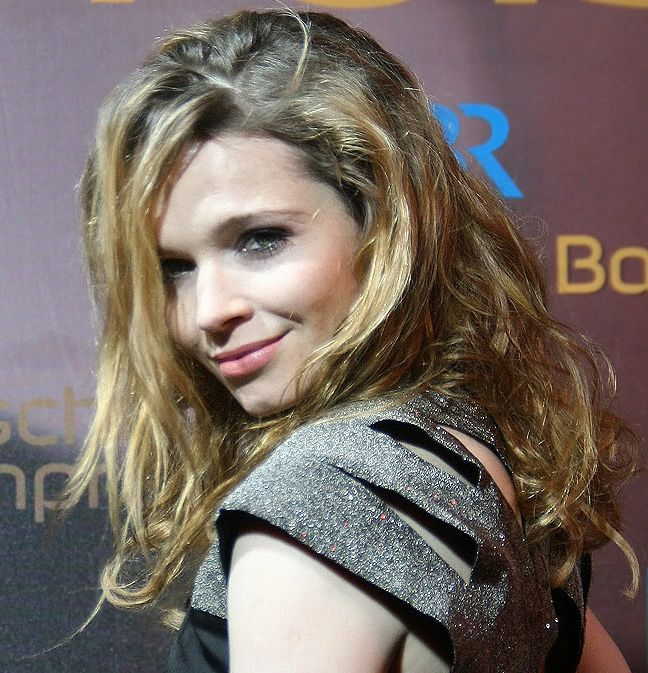
Herfurth at Bayerischer Filmpreis 2012

Karoline Herfurth (German: [kaʁoˈliːnə ˈhɛʁfʊʁt]; born 22 May 1984) is a German actress and filmmaker.

== Life and career ==
Herfurth was born in East Berlin, East Germany, the daughter of a psychologist mother and a geriatric nurse practitioner father. Her parents divorced when she was two years old. She grew up in Berlin with a brother and five half-brothers and -sisters. She went to a Waldorf school in Berlin and graduated from Ernst Busch Academy of Dramatic Arts. She learned to play the recorder and studied sociology and political sciences.

== Career ==
Herfurth had her first role in a TV-series at age ten, and her first part in a movie in 2000, when she was fifteen. She has held several parts as a teenager in German movies such as Mädchen, Mädchen (2001) and Big Girls don't cry (2002), and leading-parts both in TV productions and independent German films. For her part as Lilli Richter in Caroline Link's film A Year ago in Winter, she received the Bavarian Film-Award for best young actress in 2009.

Herfurth gave her international debut in 2006 in Perfume: The Story of a Murderer. In this adaptation of Patrick Süskind's best-selling novel Das Parfum she played the "Plum Girl", the first victim of Jean-Baptiste Grenouille. In 2008, she co-starred with Kate Winslet and Ralph Fiennes in the Academy-Award-Best-Picture-nominee The Reader.

She directed her first feature-length film SMS für Dich in 2016.

== Other activities ==
In addition to her acting career, Herfurth featured in the advertising campaigns for Jil Sander's Eve fragrance from 2011 to 2012. Since 2024, she has been the brand ambassador for cosmetics brand Weleda.

== Personal life ==
Herfurth has spoken out opposing the right-wing Pegida movement in Germany.

== Filmography ==
Film and television
Year	Title	Role	Notes
2000	Küss mich, Frosch	Mary	
2000	Crazy	Anna	
2001	Mädchen, Mädchen	Lena	titled Girls on Top in USA
2002	Big Girls Don't Cry	Steffi	
2003	Mein Name ist Bach	Prinzessin Amalie	
2004	Anemonenherz		(short)
2004	Mädchen, Mädchen 2 - Loft oder Liebe	Lena	titled Girls on Top 2 in USA
2005	Offside	Hayat	
2006	Perfume: The Story of a Murderer	The Plum Girl	
2007	Peer Gynt	Solvejg	TV
2007	Pornorama	Luzi	
2008	A Year Ago in Winter	Lilli Richter	
2008	The Reader	Marthe	
2009	Berlin 36	Gretel Bergmann	
2010	Vincent Wants to Sea	Marie	
2010	We Are the Night	Lena	
2010	So wie wir hier zusammen sind	Hilde	(short)
2011	Promising the Moon	Young Marga Baumanis	
2011	Fortress	Claudia	
2012	Zettl	Verena	
2012	Errors of the Human Body	Rebekka	
2013	Passion	Dani	
2013	Fack ju Göhte	Lisi Schnabelstedt	
2014	The Pasta Detectives	Rico's mother Tanja Doretti	
2015	Traumfrauen	Hannah Reimann	
2015	The Pasta Detectives 2	Rico's mother Tanja Doretti	
2015	Fack ju Göhte 2	Lisi Schnabelstedt	
2015	Ghosthunters on Icy Trails	Hopkins	
2016	Rico, Oskar and the Mysterious Stone	Rico's mother Tanja Doretti	
2016	SMS für Dich	Clara	Also director
2017	You Are Wanted	Lena Arandt	TV series
2018	The Little Witch	The Little Witch	
2018	Beat	Emilia	TV series
2019	Sweethearts	Franny	Also director
2019	The Perfect Secret	Carlotta Keschwari	
2022	Wunderschön	Sonja	Also director
2022	Just Something Nice	Karla	Also director
2024	A Million Minutes	Vera Küper	
2025	Wunderschöner	Sonja	Also director
