= Keren Cytter =

Israeli visual artist and writer

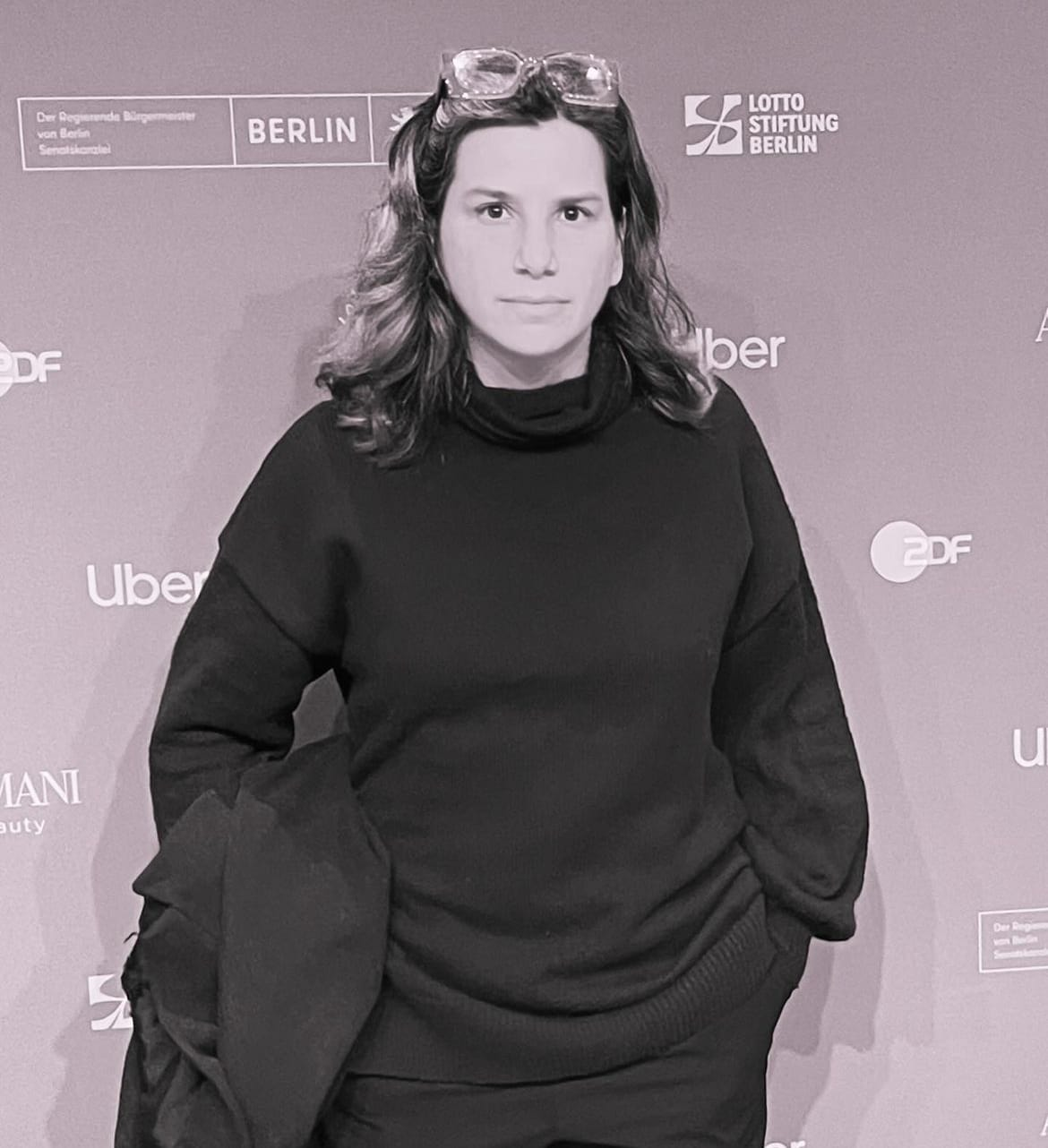
Keren Cytter in Berlinale

Keren Cytter (Hebrew: קרן ציטר; born 22 August 1977) is an Israeli visual artist and writer.

== Biography ==
Cytter, born 22 August 1977, spent her childhood in Israel and went on to study visual arts at the Avni Institute of Art and Design, Tel Aviv. After finding success in various galleries in her home country, she moved to Amsterdam on a scholarship from De Ateliers where she studied with Willem de Rooij and Marlene Dumas. Her scope of work includes film, video installations, performance, drawings and photography. She is also a writer of novels, theatre plays and poetry. She is professor at University of Fine Arts Munster.

== Work ==
=== Video Art ===
After graduating from De Ateliers in Amsterdam, Cytter made several video works that went on to be shown internationally including The Date Series (2004, a series of short narratives written, filmed and produced in the period of one year), The Victim (2006), Repulsion (2005, based on Polanski's Repulsion), and The Milk Man (2003). Among her most famous work is Der Spiegel from 2007. Four Seasons (2009) is another example of essential Cytter: the absurdist low-fi mixture of a variety of film genres, from Film noir to Melodrama, culminates in the iconic shot of a burning Christmas tree set to the dramatic music of Ferrante & Teicher.

=== Dance and Theatre ===
In 2008 Cytter formed a dance company called D.I.E NOW (Dance International Europe Now) consisting of 5 non-professional dancers. Their first production History in the Making – The True Story of John Webber, which was based on a wide range of influences including Pina Bausch, Samuel Beckett, Disney on Ice, Michael Jackson, Yvonne Rainer and the 1980s dance-floor filler Lambada, went on an international tour and was presented in Tate Modern's Turbine Hall in London, The Kitchen in New York City, Tramway in Glasgow and Hebbel am Ufer in Berlin.

The same year the British magazine Art Review ran a cover story on her entitled "I just wanted to attract attention".

She initiated her foundation APE – art projects era together with Dutch curator Maaike Gouwenberg in 2010. The aim of the organization is to develop projects (performances, exhibitions, printed matter, meetings) that cannot necessarily be realized within traditional institutional formats or frameworks.

Later that year she wrote and directed the play Show Real Drama, produced by APE and partly based on the lives of its two actors, Susanne Meyer and Fabian Stumm. In the piece, which uses videos and repetitive dialogue and movements creating a fractured yet empathetic storyline, they are struggling with the demanding entertainment business while their relationship is slowly falling apart. The production met with great success, the Houston Chronicle calling it "intriguing (...) something deconstructionist architect Frank Gehry might conjure if he were a playwright; a story pulled apart at the seams then re-configured with cool wit and 21st-century angst." As of 2014, the play has been performed all around the world from London, New York City and Houston to Shanghai, Beijing and Seoul.

In the spring of 2010 her work was featured on the cover of the American Art Magazine Artforum, which ran an extensive story on her body of work.

Her next play Anke is Gone or I Eat Pickles At Your Funeral opened in Berlin at Hebbel am Ufer in 2011 and was invited to the Images Festival Toronto in 2012.

In 2013 Cytter collaborated with musicians Keira Fox, Charlie Feinstein and David Aird on Vociferous, a fluid combination of musical concert, video work and performance which was presented at the ICA Institute of Contemporary Art, London. Adrian Searle wrote in his The Guardian review: "As a mix of live performance and video, the recent collaboration between Adam Curtis and Massive Attack at the Manchester International Festival set a standard. Vociferous is both more intimate, more alienating, and more of a mash-up (...) After a bit I gave up trying to follow anything like a story, if there was one, or to chase the projected imagery, which came and went intermittently, first on one screen, then another. I felt a bit of a berk, running through the crowd with a notebook, trying to keep up, like an undercover cop blowing my own cover. Towards the end, Fox and Feinstein take up the electronic drums, and Fox starts singing from a ragged sheet of lyrics, the music hitting such a pitch that my nostril-hairs start to vibrate in sympathy."

=== Projects ===
After six years in Berlin, Cytter relocated to New York City in 2012 where she initiated a quarterly publication focusing on art and poetry. Published by APE, it has so far featured Nora Schultz, John Kelsey and writings of Josef Strau, Matthew Dickman, Roman Baembaev, Roger van Voorhees and Sylvia Mae Gorelick.

Her 2013 solo exhibition at Pilar Corrias in London presented a new body of work called MOP (Museum of Photography) – a large archive of Polaroid photographs documenting her life as she travelled from Berlin and London, to the United States and Israel from 2012 to 2013. Taken with her 1200i and One step 600 Polaroid camera, the photographs are carefully arranged by geography and chronology and then arranged into sub-sections, titled A, B, C and D and so on, via their aesthetic. Images of friends, colleagues, curators she encountered, museums she worked in, landscapes she passed through, and her own performances are all featured. The collection consists of more than 800 polaroids.

In May 2019, Cytter had her first institutional solo presentation in Israel, titled “Sponsored Content.” The exhibition carries a deep autobiographical tone, although, as always in her work, this very tone is hinted and suggested, avoiding any direct references. For this exhibition, which is articulated in two galleries, the artist has conceived an immersive display that invites the viewer to have an unusual physical encounter with her work, generating a space for reflection, bringing up all the different life stages, from childhood to teenage, from adulthood to middle age, till old age.

=== Films ===
In February 2024, Cytter first feature film “The Wrong Movie” premiered in the forum section of the Berlinale. The film met with great success. Travis Jeppesen wrote in his Artforum review - “Those familiar with her videos, artwork, novels, and films already know Cytter as one of the great progenitors of the absurdist tradition of Beckett and Ionesco; The Wrong Movie, with its self-deprecating title and its critical incursion into present-day existential immanence and all its post-ideological squalor, was one of the 2024 Berlinale’s great unsung films." Vladan Petkovic wrote in Cineuropa “Like a Beckett drama for the digital age, The Wrong Movie deals with existential questions, such as the feeling of loss and loneliness in a constantly connected world. But it is far from trivial or redundant – there is much more to be found between the lines of this apparently simple, but in fact quite complex, work. The movie may feel wrong, but most of the time it actually seems to get things right.”

In 2024, Cytter was a member of the International Competition jury for the International Short Film Festival Oberhausen"

== Writing ==
In addition to her video and performance work, Cytter is the author of five novels: The Man Who Climbed Up the Stairs of Life and Found Out They Were Cinema Seats (Lukas and Sternberg, New York – Berlin, 2005); The Seven Most Exciting Hours of Mr. Trier’s Life in Twenty-four Chapters (Sternberg Press Berlin, 2008); The Amazing True Story of Moshe Klinberg – A Media Star (Onestar, Paris, 2009); White diaries (CCA Kitakyushu, Japan, 2011); and A-Z Life Coaching (Sternberg Press, Berlin 2016); in addition to three children’s books: The Curious Squirrel (Pork Salad Press, 2015), The Brutal Turtle, and The Furious Hamster (both Pork Salad Press / CEC Genève, 2018).

== Quotes ==
"I studied art because I wanted to go to New York and wash dishes." (2010)

"Artists are like bees. Hard to catch, they have the tendency to die after doing something meaningful." (2012)

"Not for epileptic people." (On her performance Vociferous, 2013)

== Awards ==
In 2006 Cytter won the Bâloise Prize at Art Basel, Switzerland. She also received the Ars Viva Prize 2008 in Berlin and was one of the four nominees for the 2008 Preis der Nationalgalerie für Junge Kunst, Berlin. In 2009 Cytter became the first recipient of the Absolut Art Award in Stockholm and was shortlisted for the Future Generation Art Prize in 2010. Cytter is the recipient of The Guggenheim Fellowship for Creative Arts, US & Canada (2021).
