= Walk on Water (film) =

2004 Israeli film directed by Eytan Fox

ללכת על המים (aka Walk on Water)
- Directed by: Eytan Fox
- Written by: Gal Uchovsky
- Produced by: Amir Harel
- Starring: Lior Ashkenazi; Knut Berger; Caroline Peters; Gideon Shemer; Carola Regnier
- Cinematography: Tobias Hochstein
- Edited by: Yosef Grunfeld
- Music by: Ivri Lider
- Distributed by: Samuel Goldwyn Films LLC (USA theatrical)
- Release date: 18 March 2004
- Running time: 103 minutes
- Country: Israel
- Languages: English; German; Hebrew
- Box office: $4.44 million

Walk on Water (original Hebrew title: ללכת על המים; English transliteration: Lalekhet Al HaMayim) is a 2004 Israeli spy thriller film directed by Eytan Fox and starring Lior Ashkenazi, Knut Berger, and Caroline Peters. The screenplay was written by Gal Uchovsky. Most of the dialogue is in English, although there is much in Hebrew and German. Its name derives in part from Jesus' walking on water.

== Plot ==
Eyal is an agent in Mossad, the Israeli security service. He is a hitman who targets enemies of Israel. His wife has recently committed suicide, and the agency decides that he needs to take on a less challenging assignment: to find an aging Nazi war criminal.

In order to track down the old man, Eyal poses as a tour guide and befriends the Nazi's adult grandchildren, Axel and Pia. Pia lives on a kibbutz, an Israeli commune. Her brother Axel visits her in order to convince Pia to return to Germany for their father's seventieth birthday. It is later revealed that Pia's estrangement from her parents began when she discovered that they were hiding her grandfather. She shares this information with Axel.

Although he has a job to perform, Eyal truly befriends Axel and Pia. They spend time together and Eyal enjoys himself.

When the three are at dinner one night in a Tel Aviv restaurant, Axel speaks privately to the Palestinian waiter, Rafik, and finds out where the best club in town is. Later that evening, Axel, Pia, and Eyal arrive at the club. Eyal is shocked to discover that it is a gay club. He sees Axel dancing with Rafik.

Eyal is disgusted to discover that Axel is gay. He asks to be removed from the assignment for that reason. His boss, Menachem, insists that Eyal finish the mission. Eyal visits Germany and Axel invites him to his father's birthday party. Axel's parents surprise the guests by bringing out Axel's aged grandfather. Axel angrily confronts his mother and goes to Eyal's room, where he finds a folder full of information on Axel's family. Meanwhile, Eyal meets with Menachem and tells him that they can easily take the grandfather and bring him to Israel to be tried for his war crimes. Menachem reveals that the aim is to kill the grandfather. Eyal reluctantly takes the case of poisons that Menachem gives him.

Eyal arrives at Axel's house and enters the grandfather's room. Axel sneaks up behind him and watches as he fills a syringe with poison, doing nothing to intervene. Eyal is unable to fulfill the task and leaves. Axel tenderly caresses his grandfather's face before turning off his oxygen tank, killing him. He goes to Eyal's room, where Eyal tells him that the suicide note his wife wrote told him that he kills everything that comes near him. Eyal says that he does not want to kill anymore and breaks down in Axel's arms.

The story jumps ahead 2 years. Eyal and Pia are married with a child and living on the Kibbutz. Eyal and Axel remain good friends.

== Main characters ==
- Eyal, a Mossad agent (Lior Ashkenazi)
- Axel Himmelman, a young German man (Knut Berger)
- Pia Himmelman, Axel's sister, who lives on an Israeli kibbutz (Caroline Peters)
- Menachem, Eyal's boss (Gideon Shemer)
- Rafik, a young Palestinian man with whom Axel has sex (Yousef Sweid)

== Soundtrack ==
The film's soundtrack included a rendition of the classic Esther and Avi Ofarim hit "Cinderella Rockefella" sung by Rita Kleinstein and Ivri Lider, as well as a remix of Lider's "Mary La'Netzach" ("Mary Forever").

== Release history ==
Walk on Water premiered on February 5, 2004, at the Berlin International Film Festival. It opened in Israel on March 18, 2004. It was first shown in the United States on October 24, 2004, at the Milwaukee International Film Festival. It opened in limited release in American theatres on March 4, 2005.

== Awards and nominations ==
=== Awards of the Israeli Film Academy (2004) ===
==== Won ====
- Best Music - Ivri Lider
- Best Music, Original Song - Ivri Lider
- Best Sound - Gil Toren (tie)

==== Nominated ====
- Best Film
- Best Actor - Lior Ashkenazi
- Best Director - Eytan Fox
- Best Screenplay - Gal Uchovsky
- Best Cinematography - Tobias Hochstein
- Best Editing - Yosef Grunfeld

=== France's César Awards (2006) ===
- Nominated for best foreign film
