= Weinberg (TV series) =

- Created by: Arne Nolting; Jan Martin Scharf; Philipp Steffens
- Directed by: Till Franzen; Jan Martin Scharf
- Starring: Friedrich Mücke; Antje Traue; Arved Birnbaum; Ronald Kukulies; Sinha Melina Gierke; Christina Große; David Schütter; Viktoria Trauttmansdorff; Rainer Sellien; Jonah Rausch; Jenny Schily; Yung Ngo; Marcel Glauche; Gudrun Landgrebe; Laura Tonke; Maximilian Mauff; Arnd Klawitter; Helga Boettiger; Anna Böttcher; Stella Herberg; Anna Herrmann; Emilia von Heiseler; Jonas Wenz
- Country of origin: Germany
- No. of seasons: 1
- No. of episodes: 6

Production
- Running time: 52-55 minutes

Original release
- Network: TNT Serie
- Release: 6 October – 10 November 2015

Weinberg is a German television miniseries that aired on TNT Serie in 2015. It was among the 2016 Grimme-Preis winners for television.

== See also ==
- List of German television series
