= Knut Berger =

German actor

- Born: Gelsenkirchen, North Rhine-Westphalia
- Occupation: Actor
- Years active: 2001–present

Knut Berger is a German actor. He was born in 1975 in Gelsenkirchen, North Rhine-Westphalia. He played Axel Himmelman in the 2004 Israeli film Walk on Water.

== Films ==
- Deutschland 86 - 2018 as Christoph Fischer
- Ein ganz normaler Tag - 2019
- Many Happy Returns (Der Geburtstag) - 2019
- Bones and Names (Knochen und Namen) - 2023
- Sad Jokes - 2024
