= Sad Jokes =

- Directed by: Fabian Stumm
- Screenplay by: Fabian Stumm
- Produced by: Nicola Heim; Fabian Stumm
- Starring: Fabian Stumm; Haley Louise Jones; Jonas Dassler; Ulrica Flach
- Cinematography: Michael Bennett
- Edited by: Kaspar Panizza
- Production company: Postofilm
- Distributed by: Edition Salzgeber
- Release date: June 30, 2024 (Munich)
- Running time: 96 minutes
- Country: Germany
- Language: German

Sad Jokes is a 2024 German comedy-drama film, directed by Fabian Stumm. The film stars Stumm as Joseph, a gay film director who is co-parent to Pino (Justus Meyer) with his friend Sonya (Haley Louise Jones), and is forced to adapt to the demands of being the boy's primary caregiver after Sonya is hospitalized for depression.

The cast also includes Ulrica Flach, Jonas Dassler, Godehard Giese, Marie-Lou Sellem, Anne Haug, Knut Berger, Hildegard Schroedter, Nicola Heim, Tina Pfurr, Anneke Kim Sarnau, Susie Meyer, Romina Küper, Friedrich Pinckens, Doreen Fietz, Marco Alexandro Ippoliti, Rahel Maria Savoldelli, Sebastian Schipper, Max Krumm, Wiky Kogiou, Sven Kriesten, Brunhilde Stumm, Henri Stumm, Simon Stumm and Leo Heim in supporting roles.

The film premiered at the 2024 Filmfest München, where Stumm won the award for Best Director in the German Cinema New Talent program.

It had its North American premiere in the Discovery program at the 2024 Toronto International Film Festival.

== Critical reception ==
The film received generally positive reviews.

In Screen Daily, Jonathan Romney wrote: "Cool but not austere execution – with cinematographer Michael Bennett shooting the action against flat, neutrally bright backgrounds – gives the film a contemporary German art-cinema feel. It makes a distinctive stylistic signature for this intelligent, quizzical disquisition on acting, fiction, emotion and that staple of moral comedy, the perennial danger of being misunderstood."

Chris Cassingham of In Review Online wrote: "Stumm’s aesthetic sensibilities may lean toward the cool and distant... Thankfully, his actors counterbalance these tendencies, and come to represent that intangible thing in the film we might call soul."
