= Fabian Stumm =

German actor (born 1981)

Fabian Stumm (born in 1981) is a German actor and director who studied at the Lee Strasberg Theatre and Film Institute in New York City.

He played a leading role in the 2013 mystery thriller Bela Kiss: Prologue by Lucien Förstner, and appeared in the award-winning Second World War drama Lore by Australian director Cate Shortland. His other credits include Posthumous with Brit Marling and Jack Huston; 56, which was nominated for the prestigious Max Ophüls Award; and the David Foster Wallace adaptation Neon Aura.

In 2009 he joined artist Keren Cytter's performance company D.I.E NOW on their international tour. His next collaboration with Cytter, the two-hander Show Real Drama, met with great success, the Houston Chronicle calling it "intriguing (...) Susie Meyer and Fabian Stumm bring humor, angst, and yes – real drama." The production was invited all around the world from London, Rome and New York City to Shanghai, Beijing and Seoul.

Stumm wrote and directed his medium-length film debut, Daniel, which was released in 2021. The film was awarded the prize of "Best Medium-Length Film" at the Achtung Berlin Filmfestival in 2022.

His feature directorial debut, Bones and Names (Knochen und Namen), premiered at the 73rd Berlin International Film Festival, where it was awarded the Heiner Carow Prize.

His second feature film, Sad Jokes, premiered at the 2024 Filmfest München, where Stumm won the award for Best Director in the German Cinema New Talent program.

He is out as gay.
