= Friedrich Mücke =

German actor (born 1981)

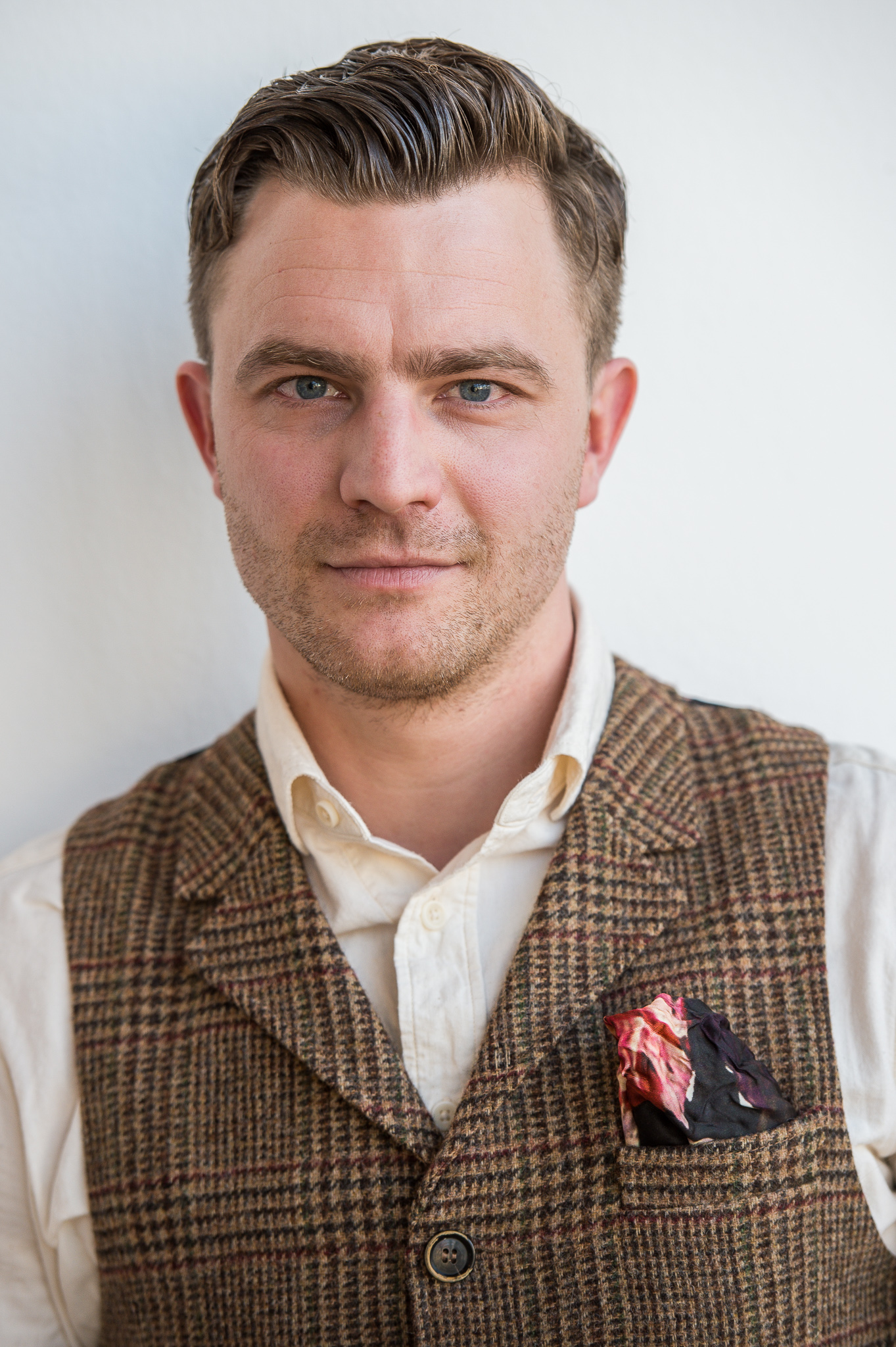
- Friedrich Mücke (2017)
- Born: 12 March 1981 (age 45); East Berlin, East Germany (now Berlin, Germany)
- Occupation: Actor
- Years active: 2006-present

Friedrich Mücke (born 12 March 1981) is a German actor who has appeared in more than twenty films since 2006, many of which have tackled issues relating to the former GDR (the Communist state that was commonly known as East Germany).

== Selected filmography ==
Year	Title	Role	Notes
2010	Friendship!	Veit Jagoda	
2010	Mahler on the Couch	Walter Gropius	
2011	What a Man	Doctor	
2012	Russian Disco	Mischa	
2012	Ludwig II	Richard Hornig	
2014	Joy of Fatherhood	Henne	
2014	Everything Is Love	Klaus	
2015	Weinberg	Johannes Fuchs	
2015	Berlin One	Paul Lang	TV film
2016	SMS für Dich	Mark	
2018	Balloon	Peter Strelzyk	
2025	Wunderschöner	Milan	
2026	Extrawurst	Matthias Scholz	Cinema film
