= Bones and Names =

2023 German drama film

- Official poster
- German: Knochen und Namen
- Directed by: Fabian Stumm
- Screenplay by: Fabian Stumm
- Produced by: Fabian Stumm; Nicola Heim
- Starring: Fabian Stumm; Knut Berger; Marie-Lou Sellem; Susie Meyer
- Cinematography: Michael Bennett
- Edited by: Kaspar Panizza
- Production company: Postofilm
- Release date: 19 February 2023 (Berlinale)
- Running time: 104 minutes
- Country: Germany
- Languages: German; French

Bones and Names (German: Knochen und Namen) is a 2023 German drama film written and directed by Fabian Stumm in his feature directorial debut, starring himself along with Knut Berger, Marie-Lou Sellem and Susie Meyer. The relationship drama presents subtle irony of the partnership between an actor and an author that turns out to be more vulnerable to crises than expected.

It is selected in Perspektive Deutsches Kino to compete for the Compass-Perspektive-Award at the 73rd Berlin International Film Festival, where it had its world premiere on 19 February 2023. The film is also nominated for Best Feature Film Teddy Award.

== Synopsis ==
Boris is an actor and Jonathan a writer both have been in a relationship for many years. Their relationship is now at turning point as both have found new interests. Jonathan is totally lost in writing a new novel and actor Boris and his younger colleague Tim are getting closer. At the same time Jonathan's single sister, Natasha and her puckish young daughter Josie are struggling for distance, closeness, trust, desire and fear of loss. They both are turning to unconventional ways to deal with the relationship issues.

== Cast ==
- Fabian Stumm as Boris
- Knut Berger as Jonathan
- Marie-Lou Sellem as Jeanne
- Susie Meyer as Carla
- Magnus Mariuson as Tim
- Doreen Fietz as Natascha
- Alma Meyer-Prescott as Josie
- Anneke Kim Sarnau as Helen
- Godehard Giese as Becks
- Ruth Reinecke as Heidi
- Ernst Stötzner as Michael
- Anne Haug as Stella
- Louise Helm as Marie
- Haley Louise Jones as Naima
- Tanju Bilir as Yasin
- Nicola Heim as Lucy
- Milena Thirty as Lara
- Rainer Sellien as Dahlmann

== Production ==
Fabian Stumm after the award-winning 2022 short film Daniel, planned the feature-length film. He in addition to his work as a screenwriter and director, also choose to have leading role. The filming began on 19 September 2022 in Berlin and was wrapped up on 7 October 2022.

== Release ==
Bones and Names had its premiere on 19 February 2023 as part of the 73rd Berlin International Film Festival, in Perspektive Deutsches Kino. It is slated for a German cinema release in January 2024.

The US-premiere was held at Outfest in Los Angeles on July 20. 2023 where it was screened in the International Feature Film competition.

== Reception ==
The film received generally positive reviews, with Harald Mühlbeyer of Kino-Zeit calling the film "a highly successful play with the formalities of filmmaking and with the emotions that cinema can generate."

For Peter Gutting of Film-Rezensionen, the film is "a relationship film infused with quiet humor. Director Fabian Stumm exposes the cracks in partnerships on various levels with great seriousness and sensitivity, without compromising the entertainment value of his debut. That doesn't make the film a comedy yet, but a sensitive study of the nuances in human coexistence."

Kira Taszman from Filmdienst writes: "The sketch of two creative people who sometimes take their art too much into life and vice versa succeeds. The portrayal of a long-term relationship between love, sensitivities, habit and not always admitted desire for something new between two partners, played very engagingly by Fabian Stumm and Knut Berger, is also convincing."

In contrast, Lida Bach of movie break rated the film 3 out of 10 and wrote, "Fabian Stumm's meaningless and uneventful self-reflection works best as an involuntary milieu study of the upper middle class." Concluding Bach opined that "production is a lesson in cinematic adeptism" and said, "In addition to relevance and substance, it lacks humor and drama."

== Accolades ==
Award	Date	Category	Recipient	Result	Ref.
Berlin International Film Festival	26 February 2023	Heiner Carow Prize	Fabian Stumm	Won	
Berlin International Film Festival	26 February 2023	Teddy Award for Best Feature Film	Bones and Names	Nominated	
