= A Million Minutes =

2024 German comedy drama film

- Theatrical release poster
- Directed by: Christopher Doll
- Written by: Monika Fässler; Tim Hebborn; Malte Welding; Ulla Ziemann; Christopher Doll
- Based on: One Million Minutes: What My Daughter Taught Me About Time by Wolf Küper
- Produced by: Lothar Hellinger; Christopher Doll
- Starring: Tom Schilling; Karoline Herfurth
- Cinematography: Andreas Berger
- Edited by: Alexander Dittner
- Music by: Dascha Dauenhauer
- Production companies: Hellinger / Doll Filmproduktion; Warner Bros. Film Productions Germany; herbX film; Erfttal Film
- Distributed by: Warner Bros. Pictures
- Release date: 1 February 2024
- Running time: 125 minutes
- Country: Germany
- Language: German
- Box office: $11 million

A Million Minutes (German: Eine Million Minuten), also known as 1 Million Minutes, is a 2024 German comedy drama film directed by Christopher Doll, based on the autobiographical novel One Million Minutes: What My Daughter Taught Me About Time by Wolf Küper.

== Cast ==
- Tom Schilling as Wolf Küper
- Karoline Herfurth as Vera Küper
- Pola Friedrichs as Nina Küper
- Piet Levi Busch as Simon Küper
- Hassan Akkouch as Ben
- Anneke Kim Sarnau as Claudia Hergenrath
- Rúrik Gíslason as Einar
- Ulrike Kriener as Renate Küper
- Joachim Król as Werner Küper
- Godehard Giese as Dr. Finkelbach
- Jónmundur Grétarsson as Jon
- Tommi Thor Gudmundsson as Siggi
