= Annette Focks =

German musician and film score composer

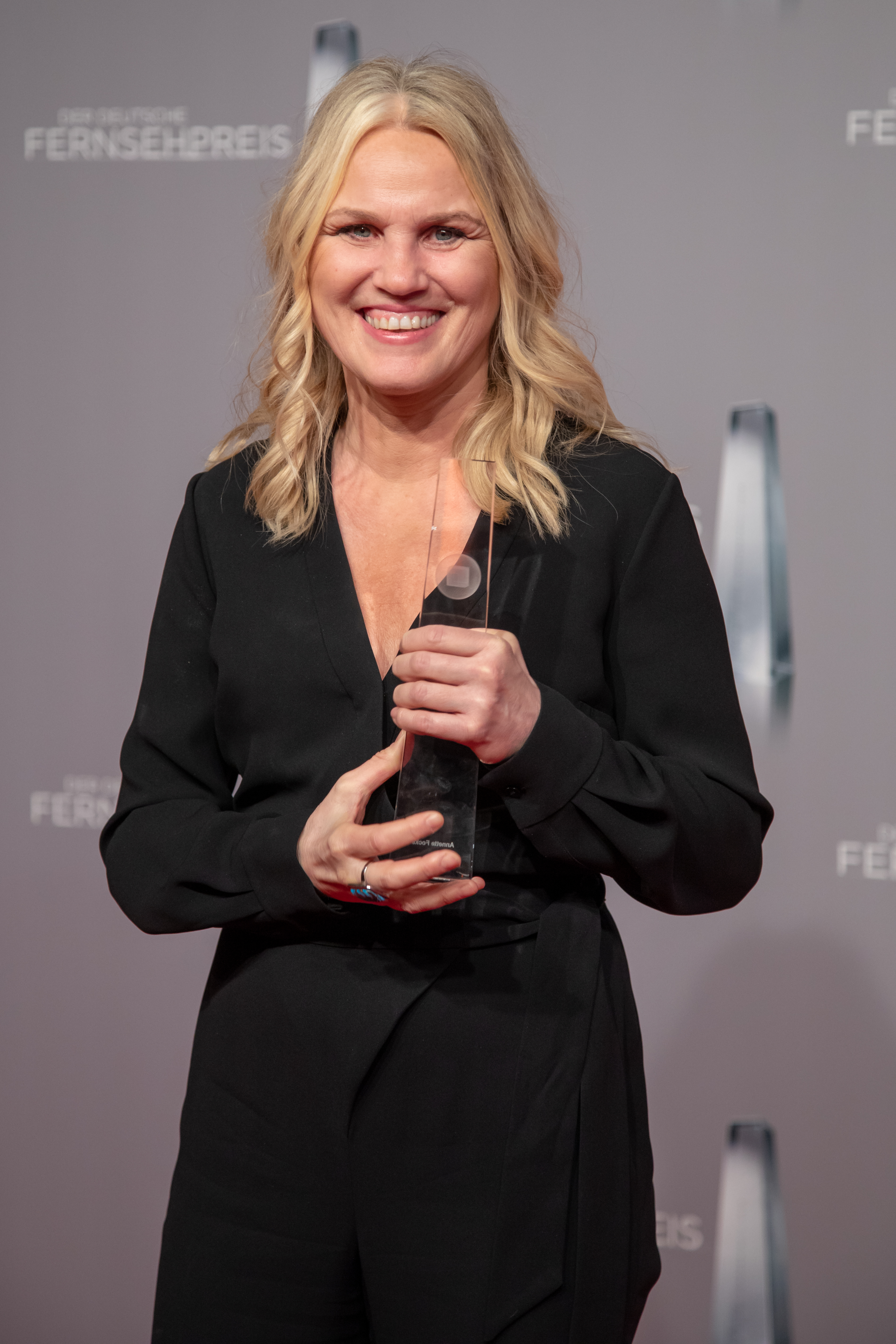
- Annette Focks at the German TV Award 2019 in Düsseldorf's Rheinterrasse
- Born: 28 August 1964 (age 61); Thuine, West Germany
- Occupation: Composer
- Years active: 1997–present

Annette Focks (born 28 August 1964) is a German musician and film score composer. She contributed to more than eighty films since 1997 including Night Train to Lisbon, Four Minutes and John Rabe.

== Education ==
Annette Focks studied film score composition at the Hochschule für Theater und Musik in München. She then worked in workshops of sound-designer Randy Thom and orchestrator Steven Scott Smalley.
