= Lindroth =

Lindroth is a surname of Swedish origin. Notable people with the surname include:

- Carl H. Lindroth (1905–1979), Swedish entomologist
- Eric Lindroth, American retired water polo player
- Helen Lindroth (1874–1956), Swedish-born American screen and stage actress
- John Lindroth (athlete) (1906–1974), Finnish pole vaulter
- John Lindroth (gymnast) (1883–1960), Finnish gymnast
- Lasse Lindroth (1972–1999), Swedish comedian, actor and writer
- Linda Lindroth (1946—), American artist
- Lloyd Lindroth (1931–1994), American harpist
- Scott Lindroth, American composer and teacher
- Sten Lindroth (1914–1980), Swedish historian of education and science
- Amy Cecilia Lindroth (1993–present), Artist and Musician
