= Nik Dodani =

American actor and comedian (born 1993)

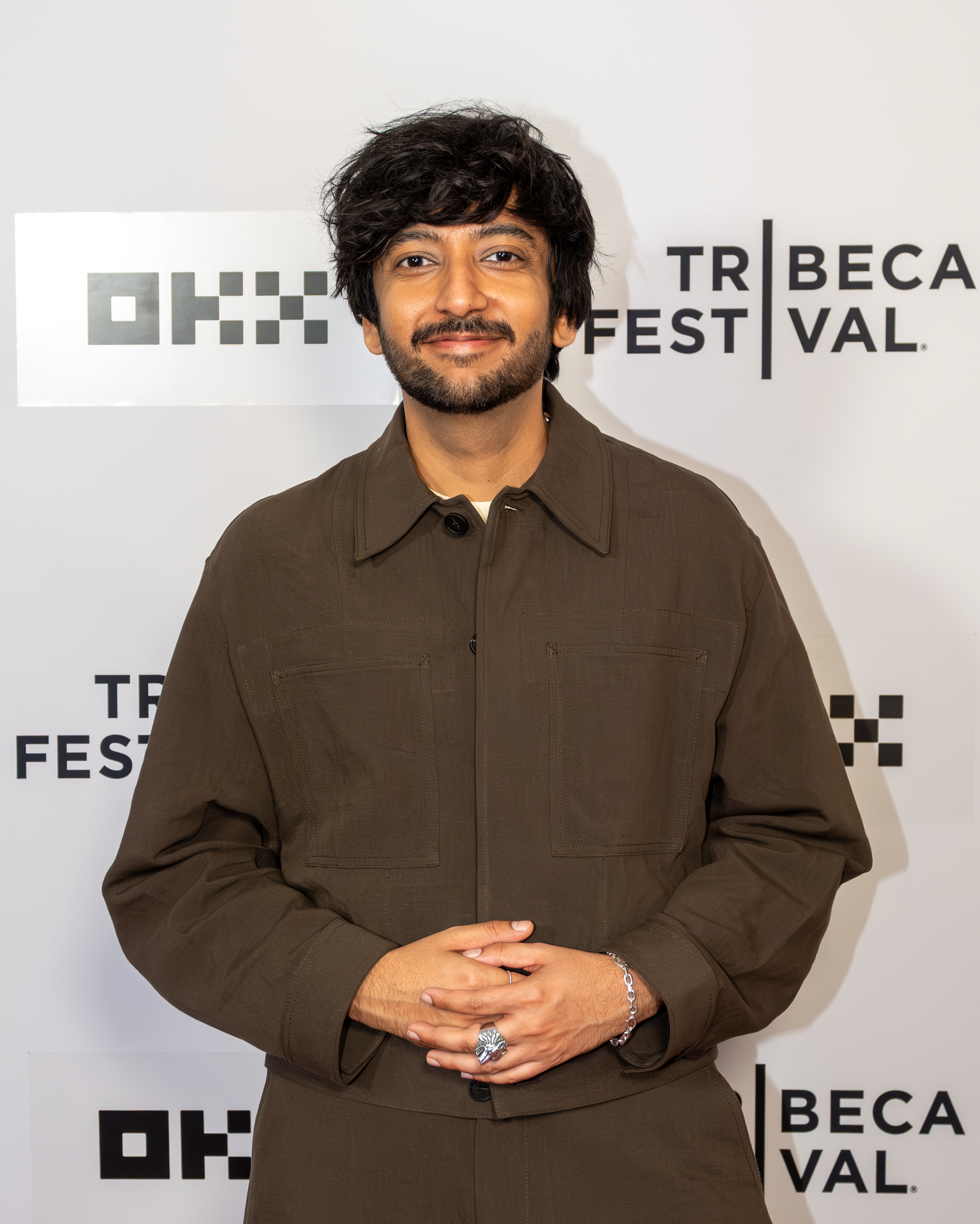
- Dodani in 2026
- Born: December 19, 1993 (age 32); Dallas, Texas, U.S.
- Occupations: Actor; comedian
- Years active: 2008–present
- Known for: Atypical; Murphy Brown

Nik Dodani (born December 19, 1993) is an American actor, writer, and comedian known for his roles as Zahid in the Netflix comedy-drama series Atypical, and Pat Patel in the revival of the popular CBS sitcom Murphy Brown.

== Career ==
=== Acting ===
Nik Dodani began his acting career in Phoenix-area community theater, his first notable role being Zero in a staged production of Holes based on the novel by Louis Sachar. Dodani made his television debut in season 2 of HBO's The Comeback starring Lisa Kudrow.

On television, Dodani has also appeared in ABC's Big Sky, Netflix's Trinkets, TBS's Angie Tribeca, Comedy Central's Idiotsitter, Freeform's Kevin from Work, and NBC's The Player, among others.

In film, Dodani has appeared in Netflix's Alex Strangelove, Joshua Leonard's independent film Dark Was the Night opposite Marisa Tomei and Charlie Plummer, the Sony Pictures thriller Escape Room, Hannah Marks' feature film Mark, Mary & Some Other People, and Stephen Chbosky's film adaptation of Broadway musical Dear Evan Hansen as Jared, who was re-conceived as "Jared Kalwani" to reflect Dodani's casting. In July 2024, he appeared in Lee Isaac Chung's Twisters, a follow up to the 1996 film Twister.

In March 2022, it was announced he would lead the New Line Cinema comedy The Parenting, opposite Brandon Flynn, Lisa Kudrow and Brian Cox. The film released on Max on March 13, 2025.

Dodani has voiced characters on numerous animated programs, including Nickelodeon's Big Nate, Disney's The Owl House and Hailey's On It!, and Disney Junior's Mira, Royal Detective. Dodani also voiced a character in the 2022 Disney animated film Strange World.

He made his Broadway debut as Ogie in Waitress from October 19 to November 27, 2021.

In February 2026, it was announced that Dodani was cast in the CBS series Cupertino.

=== Stand-up comedy ===
Dodani began performing stand-up comedy in 2015 and made his late-night stand-up comedy debut on The Late Show with Stephen Colbert on September 28, 2018.

=== Writing and producing ===
In October 2018, it was announced that Dodani would write the screenplay for the film adaptation of Rakesh Satyal's novel Blue Boy. In March 2022, Dodani launched his own production banner, Cosmic Pomegranate, with creative partner Joey Long.

In 2023, Dodani served as a co-producer of Life of Pi on Broadway, a play written by Lolita Chakrabarti as an adaptation of the novel by Yann Martel. Dodani served as an architect of The Power of Pi Project, "a first-of-its-kind effort from a Broadway production to connect with the AAPI community in New York and beyond."

=== Advocacy ===
During the 2016 presidential election, Dodani was a producer for MoveOn, where he organized a political comedy tour called Laughter Trumps Hate. He previously worked as a communications consultant at RALLY, an issue advocacy firm based in Hollywood, and as a graphic designer and student organizer on Elizabeth Warren's 2012 Senate campaign.

In 2019, Dodani co-founded The Salon along with Bash Naran and Vinny Chhibber. The Salon is a forum for South Asian creatives in western creative arts. Dodani told The Hindu in 2021, "Our vision is to help the next generation of South Asian talent."

Dodani was active in organizing the South Asian community in support of the Joe Biden 2020 presidential campaign and in support of Kamala Harris. He also played an active role in organizing other entertainers for the Black Lives Matter movement.

== Personal life ==
Dodani is of Indian Sindhi descent and openly gay. He graduated from BASIS Scottsdale in 2011 and studied politics at Occidental College in Los Angeles.

== Filmography ==
Key
†	Denotes works that have not yet been released

=== Film ===
Year	Title	Role	Notes
2016	Other People	Ron	
2016	The Good Neighbor	Sanjay	
2018	Alex Strangelove	Blake	
2018	Dark Was the Night	Seamus	
2019	Escape Room	Danny Khan	
2021	Mark, Mary & Some Other People	Kyle	
2021	Dear Evan Hansen	Jared Kalwani	
2022	Strange World	Kardez	Voice role
2024	The A-Frame	Rishi	
2024	Twisters	Praveen	
2025	The Parenting	Rohan	
2025	The Napa Boys	Gracer	
2026	She Keeps Me Young		

=== Television ===
Year	Title	Role	Notes
2008	Living with Abandon	Paku	TV movie
2014	The Comeback	Harry	2 episodes
2014	Selfie	Bookstore Employee	Episode: "I Woke Up Like This"
2015	Kevin from Work	Paul Garfunkle	2 episodes
2015	The Player	Solomon Desai	Episode: "House Rules"
2017	Idiotsitter		Episode: "Rush, Rush"
2017–2021	Atypical	Zahid Raja	37 episodes
2018	Murphy Brown	Pat Patel	13 episodes
2018	Angie Tribeca	CRISPIN_GLOVES0FF295	Episode: "Joystick Luck Club"
2019–2020	Trinkets	Chase	6 episodes
2021	The Owl House	Gavin (voice)	Episode: "Through the Looking Glass Ruins"
2022	Big Sky	Ronith	Episode: "The Muffin or the Hammer"
2022	Mira, Royal Detective	Anish (voice)	Episode: "Mikku and Chikku's Hometown Mystery"
2022–2023	Big Nate	Randy Betancourt (voice)	Recurring cast
2023–2024	Hailey's On It!	Thad (voice)	Recurring cast
2026	Ted	Nimeet Farooq	Episode: "Roe v. Weed"
2026	Cupertino	Vikram Malhotra	
