= Shades Valley High School =

Coordinates: 33.54193°N 86.66745°W

Location
- 6100 Old Leeds Road; Irondale, Alabama 35210; United States

Information
- Type: Public
- Established: 1948 (78 years ago)
- CEEB code: 010415
- Principal: Taki Sarhaan
- Faculty: 66.50 (FTE)
- Grades: 9-12
- Enrollment: 1,122 (2023-2024)
- Student to teacher ratio: 16.87
- Education system: Jefferson County Board of Education
- Campus: Suburban
- Colors: Red and black
- Athletics: AHSAA Class 6A
- Nickname: Mounties
- Feeder schools: Irondale Middle School
- Website: www.jefcoed.com/o/shadesvalleyhs

Shades Valley High School (SVHS) is a four-year public secondary school in the Birmingham, Alabama suburb of Irondale. The school was established in 1948 near Homewood and moved to its present location in 1996. SVHS is the largest of 14 high schools in the Jefferson County School District. The school's colors are red and black, and its athletic teams are called the Mounties. SVHS competes in AHSAA Class 4A athletics.

SVHS previously shared its campus with the Jefferson County International Baccalaureate School (JCIB). The Shades Valley Technical Academies (SVTA) are on a separate campus two miles away. The automotive building was completed in January 2026 and is on campus.

== History ==
In the mid-1940s, the city of Homewood petitioned the county school board to construct a new high school as a replacement for the aging Shades Cahaba High School to serve Birmingham's fast-growing Over the Mountain suburbs. In 1947 Homewood and Mountain Brook residents approved a five-mill property tax to support development of a new school, which opened in the Fall of 1949. The building was dedicated on May 25, 1950, and had an initial enrollment of 870 students, which more than doubled by 1956 before Mountain Brook formed its own school system.

When it was established, SVHS was designed to serve students from across Homewood, Mountain Brook, Vestavia Hills, and Hoover. Over the years, each of these suburbs formed their own school systems, shifting the SVHS student population away from the campus and leading to the need for SVHS to relocate. In 1994, the Jefferson County School Board voted to acquire land for a new site for Shades Valley High School. The new 42-acre site was located in Irondale, almost eight miles from the school's original location. A groundbreaking ceremony was held October 18, 1994, at the new site and the new school building opened to students on August 14, 1996. It contains 78 classrooms, three science laboratories, a teaching kitchen, nine computer labs, two gymnasiums, a weight room, a large state-of-the-art auditorium, and band and choral suites. The original building was then demolished for construction of the Colonial Bank Building.

== Student profile ==
Enrollment in grades 9-12 for the 2013–14 school year was approximately 1,348 students.

SVHS has a graduation rate of 93%. Approximately 89% of its students meet or exceed state proficiency standards in reading, and about 90% do so in mathematics. The average ACT score for SVHS students is 22 and the average SAT composite is 1110.

== Curriculum ==
SVHS offers a variety of courses at all levels of academic rigor. Approximately 29% of students take one or more of the following Advanced Placement courses:

- Biology
- Calculus
- Chemistry
- Computer Science
- Economics
- English Language & Composition
- English Literature & Composition
- Environmental Science
- French
- German
- Human Geography
- Modern European History
- Music Theory
- Physics
- Psychology
- Spanish
- Statistics
- Studio Art
- US Government & Politics
- US History

Students can also take advantage of four different career-focused academies:

- Academy of Business & Finance, which partners with local businesses to prepare students for success in college and industry
- Jefferson County Academy of Theatre and Dance
- Jefferson County School of Visual Art
- Pre-Engineering Academy, which introduces high school students to concepts of engineering modeling and design using the nationally recognized Project Lead the Way curriculum

== Athletics ==
=== Current Sports ===
SVHS fields teams in the following competitive sports:

Girls' Sports	Boys' Sports
Basketball	Baseball
Bowling	Basketball
Cheerleading (Varsity and Junior Varsity)	Bowling
Cross Country Track	Cross Country Track
Golf	Football (Varsity & Junior Varsity)
Indoor Track	Golf
Outdoor Track & Field	Indoor Track
Soccer	Outdoor Track & Field
Softball	Soccer
Tennis	Tennis
Volleyball	Wrestling

=== History ===
SVHS athletic teams have won six state championships:

- Boys' golf (1957)
- Boys' soccer (2001, 2004, 2006)
- Boys' track and field (1966)
- Girls' basketball (2014)

SVHS teams have also accomplished the following:

- The baseball team played for the state 4A championship in 1980, finishing runner-up to Davidson High of Mobile.
- The boys' basketball team played in the state final four in 1954, 1962, 1971, 1980 & 1984, finishing second in 1971.
- The girls' basketball team played in the state final four in 1997, 2014 & 2015.
- In addition to the three state championships noted above, the boys' soccer finished runner-up in the 2000 state championship.
- The football team has won over 500 games all-time, which is the second most all-time wins for any team in Jefferson County. SVHS has also accumulated a total of 13 region & area championships, three undefeated regular seasons, and finished runner-up in the state in 1987 & 1994.

== Student activities ==
SVHS sponsors a variety of student activities, including many nationally affiliated clubs and organizations. The following is a list of many of these:

- Art Club
- Beta Club
- Chess & Strategic Gaming Club
- Choirs
- Counterpane Literary Magazine
- Debate Club
- Diamond Dolls
- Family, Career, and Community Leaders of America
- Fellowship of Christian Athletes
- French Club
- Future Business Leaders of America
- Future Problem Solvers
- Mountie News Channel
- National Art Honor Society
- National Honor Society
- National Technical Honor Society
- Science Olympiad
- Shades Valley Marching Band
- Student Government
- Tower Yearbook

== Notable alumni ==
- George Atkins – former NFL player
- Edward M. Burgess – American chemist, Former professor of chemistry at Georgia Tech, and inventor of the Burgess reagent
- DeMarius Copes - film and Broadway performer
- Brian Gowins – former NFL player
- Hubert Green – a professional golfer who has won numerous professional golf tournaments at both the PGA Tour and Champions Tour level.
- Marion Hobby – former NFL player
- Kate Jackson – actress (Charlie's Angels, Scarecrow and Mrs. King)
- Joel McCoy – former NFL halfback, Detroit Lions (1946)
- Daron Payne - nose tackle for the Washington Redskins of the National Football League.
- Saleem Rasheed – former NFL and CFL player for the San Francisco 49ers, Houston Texans & Calgary Stampeders.
- Leah Rawls – water skiing champion, historian
- Daniel Scheinert - film director and writer, one half of the film making duo Daniels
- Shannon Shorr – professional poker player.
- Van Snider – former MLB player (Cincinnati Reds)
- Luther Strange - Former United States Senator and Attorney General of Alabama
- Ben Tamburello – former NFL player
- Reginald Turner – former UAB and Denver Nuggets basketball player.
- Christian Watford – professional basketball player for Hapoel Eilat of the Israeli Super League; played college basketball at Indiana University
- Frank A. Welch - Ninth Master Chief Petty Officer of the U.S. Coast Guard
- Randall Woodfin - current mayor of Birmingham, Alabama.
