= Mason Gross School of the Arts =

School of performing and fine arts at Rutgers University in New Jersey

Coordinates: 40.49276°N 74.44488°W

Rutgers Mason Gross School of the Arts
- Type: School of the Arts
- Established: 1976; 50 years ago
- Affiliations: Rutgers University
- Faculty: 324
- Students: 1169 (2019)
- Undergraduates: 861 (2019)
- Postgraduates: 308 (2019)
- Location: New Brunswick, New Jersey, United States
- Campus: Urban/suburban
- Website: masongross.rutgers.edu

Mason Gross School of the Arts (Mason Gross or MGSA) is the arts conservatory at Rutgers University in New Brunswick, New Jersey. It offers undergraduate and graduate degrees in art, design, dance, filmmaking, music, and theater. Mason Gross is highly selective in terms of admissions, with a low admission rate. It is named for Mason W. Gross, the sixteenth president of Rutgers.

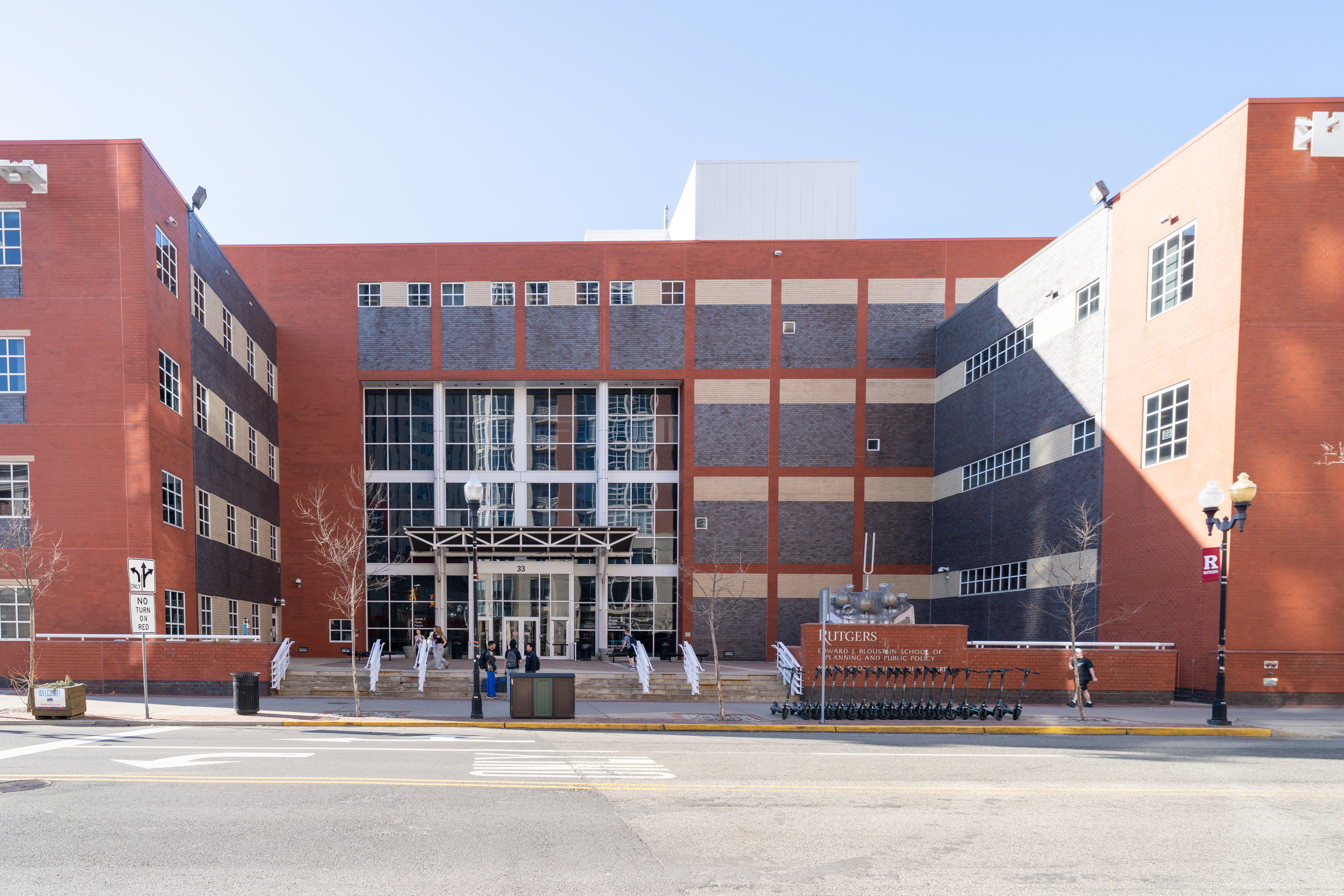
MGSA has spaces in the Civic Square government and theatre district.

== History and location ==
In 1960, during the Fluxus movement at the university, Rutgers established the Rutgers MFA in visual arts as the first non-displicinary-specific fine arts graduate program in the United States. Mason Gross was founded in 1976 as a school of the fine and performing arts within Rutgers University.

That year, Mason Gross became a separate degree-granting institution from the other undergraduate colleges. Drama teacher William Esper founded and led the professional training in acting from 1977 to 2004. All fine arts departments at the other Rutgers colleges were merged into Mason Gross in 1981. Theater actor, director, and playwright Jack Bettenbender served as first dean of the school, from 1976 until his death in 1988.

=== Campus ===
As of 2005, MGSA had expanded to more than 20 buildings, mainly within Rutgers' Douglass College campus and including studios at the Livingston campus. The Bettenbender Plaza outdoor space was dedicated in 2002 to honor founding dean John Bettenbender. The square is a gathering spot for students between classes, the site of impromptu performances and an outdoor setting for evening events. Actor and director Avery Brooks gave the dedication. Bettenbender Plaza sits in front of Nicholas Music Center, a 704-seat music hall designed by Pietro Belluschi, and the Mason Gross Performing Arts Center, which is home to more than 300 performances and exhibitions a year.

=== New Brunswick theater district ===
Slightly up river from the primary MGSA campus and south of the train station is the City of New Brunswick's downtown Civic Square. This arts and theater district is home to off-campus Mason Gross studios, galleries, and stages. The Civic Square Building at 33 Livingston Avenue contains studio facilities and classrooms. It stands next to the former silent film movie palace which is now the State Theatre for performing arts.

The New Brunswick Performing Arts Center opened in Civic Square in 2019. It hosts theater performances at Mason Gross alongside professional companies American Repertory Ballet, Crossroads Theatre, and George Street Playhouse. George Street Playhouse and Crossroads are Actors' Equity companies which can provide theater students with professional opportunities in order to obtain their Equity card.

Mason Gross Galleries at Civic Square shows graduate and undergraduate student work.

== Academics ==
=== Theater ===
Mason Gross offers the Bachelor of Fine Arts in Theater and the Master of Fine Arts in Theater. Rutgers Conservatory at Shakespeare’s Globe in London provides Mason Gross drama students with the opportunity for classical conservatory study abroad. The drama training at MGSA is built in part upon the Meisner technique.

=== Film ===
MGSA established the Rutgers Filmmaking Center in 2011. Though it is a relatively new program, Rutgers' BFA film program has been ranked highly among the nation's film schools. Variety named it "one of the top programs in the United States." The Documentary Film Lab, led by Academy Award-winner Thomas Lennon, and intensive production classes and advanced technical workshops are among the notable features of the program. The conservatory-style model has a low student-teacher ratio of around 12-to-1. Graduates of the program have gained admission to top-tier graduate programs, and notable visiting filmmakers to the program have included filmmaker Robert Eggers. The first film graduating class at Mason Gross was in May 2019. The Rutgers Filmmaking Center, alongside other Rutgers organizations such as the Rutgers Film Co-op/New Jersey Media Arts Center and the Cinema Studies program, presents a number of film festivals.

=== Music ===
MGSA offers the Bachelor of Music, Master of Music, Doctor of Musical Arts, Artist Diploma in Music, and MA and Ph.D. in composition, theory, and musicology. Modernist composer Robert Moevs taught at the school. A number of notable New Brunswick bands have formed over the years at the university and in New Brunswick's music scene at large.

=== Art and design ===
MGSA offers a Bachelor of Fine Arts in Design and in Visual Arts and Master of Fine Arts in Design and in Visual Arts.

Kara Walker currently serves as an endowed chair. Visual artist Didier William, photographer Mark McKnight and conceptual artist Park McArthur are among faculty.

In the early 1950s, artist Allan Kaprow taught at Rutgers University and helped start the Fluxus group alongside professors Robert Watts, Geoffrey Hendricks, and Roy Lichtenstein; artists George Brecht and George Segal; and students Lucas Samaras and Robert Whitman. Al Hansen also taught at the university. The department has alumni like Joan Snyder, Clifford Owens, and Pope.L and students exhibit their thesis work in New York City annually.

=== Dance ===
The school offers a BFA in Dance, with master's degree options in Dance Education and Pedagogy.

The Chair of the Department is John Evans and the Associate Chair of the Department is Ani Javian. The Director of EdM in Dance Education Program is Fredrick Curry.

=== Research ===
Mason Gross collaborates with Rutgers at large in exploring the role of the arts in analyzing and explaining facts and ideas. Mason Gross has three research centers dedicated to arts-integrated research and pedagogy: the Documentary Film Lab, the Integrated Dance Collaboratory, and the Rutgers Printmaking Collaborative.

The Blanche and Irving Laurie Music Library houses approximately 15,000 recordings and 30,000 monographs and scores, serving as a research and reference library at all levels.

== Selectivity ==
The school is highly selective. Only 9 percent of drama applicants are admitted. Mason Gross's overall acceptance rate is in the 18-21% range.

== Student life ==
MGSA has more than 500 events taking place annually on campus, alongside classes, rehearsals and numerous recreational activities. Mason Gross is home to a wide variety of performing choirs and ensembles. Rutgers Day is an annual festival.

== Notable MGSA alumni and faculty ==
- Atif Akin (artist, designer)
- Emma Amos (painter)
- Andrea Anders (actress, Mr. Sunshine, Joey)
- Alice Aycock (sculptor)
- Roger Bart (Tony-winning actor, You're a Good Man, Charlie Brown, The Producers, Desperate Housewives)
- Natalie Bookchin (media artist)
- Bill Bowers (mime artist and actor)
- Avery Brooks (actor, jazz and opera singer, Star Trek: Deep Space Nine)
- Kevin Chamberlin (Tony-nominated actor, The Addams Family, Disney Channel's Jessie)
- Nicholas Alexander Chavez (actor, did not graduate)
- Paul Cohen (classical-contemporary saxophonist/saxophone historian)
- Mike Colter (actor, Million Dollar Baby, The Good Wife, Luke Cage)
- Cook Thugless members
- Jessica Darrow (actress/singer, voices Luisa Madrigal in Encanto)
- Kristin Davis (Emmy-nominated actress, Sex and the City)
- Mike Dawson (cartoonist)
- Tim DeKay (actor, White Collar, Carnivale, Tell Me You Love Me)
- Melvin Edwards (celebrated abstract steel metal sculptor)
- Angela Ellsworth (artist)
- Michael Esper (actor, Broadway's American Idiot)
- Brandon Flynn (actor, 13 Reasons Why)
- Calista Flockhart (Golden Globe-winning actress, Ally McBeal, The Birdcage)
- Midori Francis (actress)
- Derrick Gardner (jazz trumpeter)
- Tina Gharavi (filmmaker, professor)
- David M. Greenberg (psychologist, neuroscientist, and musician)
- Nancy Gustafson (soprano, faculty)
- Amanda Harberg (pianist and composer)
- Israel Hicks (stage director who presented August Wilson's entire 10-play Pittsburgh Cycle)
- Mary Howard (set and production designer)
- Sean Jones (former lead trumpet in the Lincoln Center Jazz Orchestra)
- Allan Kaprow (painter, assemblagist and pioneer in establishing the concepts of performance art)
- Jane Krakowski (actress)
- Kenneth Lampl (composer)
- Roy Lichtenstein (pop artist)
- Linda Lindroth (artist)
- Ardele Lister (media artist)
- Raphael Montañez Ortíz (performance artist)
- Matt Mulhern (actor, writer, director, historian, Biloxi Blues, Major Dad, Duane Hopwood)
- Tarik O'Regan (composer)
- Okieriete Onaodowan (actor, Hamilton, Station 19 - did not graduate)
- Nell Irvin Painter (artist, historian, author, The History of White People)
- Marissa Paternoster (lead singer, Screaming Females)
- Cristina Pato (musician with Yo-Yo Ma's Silk Road Ensemble)
- Tom Pelphrey (Emmy-winning actor, Guiding Light, As The World Turns, Broadway's End of the Rainbow)
- Tara Platt (voice actress)
- William Pope.L (performance artist)
- Melissa Potter (artist)
- Molly Price (actress, Third Watch, Broadway's Death of a Salesman)
- Sheryl Lee Ralph (actress, singer, Dreamgirls, Moesha)
- Charles Ray (artist)
- Harry Romero (DJ and record producer known as "Harry Choo Choo Romero")
- Martha Rosler (artist)
- Bess Rous (actress)
- Gary Schneider (artist)
- Laurie Steelink MFA 1990, (visual artist)
- George Segal (painter and sculptor)
- Katrín Sigurdardóttir (sculptor, installation artist)
- Dave Sirulnick (MTV executive)
- Joan Snyder (artist)
- Keith Sonnier (minimalist, performance, video and light artist)
- Terell Stafford (jazz trumpeter)
- Sebastian Stan (actor, Bucky Barnes/Winter Soldier, Marvel Cinematic Universe)
- Aaron Stanford (actor)
- Laurie Steelink (Native American visual artist)
- Arnold Steinhardt (first violinist, Guarneri Quartet)
- Terrell Tilford (actor)
- James Tupper (actor, Men In Trees, Grey's Anatomy)
- Dietlinde Turban (actor, faculty)
- Stephen Westfall (painter)
- John Yau (poet)

== See also ==
- List of university and college schools of music
- Fluxus at Rutgers University
- New Jersey music venues by capacity
- New Jersey Theatre Alliance
- Institute of Jazz Studies, described as world's largest jazz-related library and archive, at Rutgers University-Newark
- New Jersey Motion Picture & Television Commission
- New Brunswick, New Jersey music scene
- Bruce Springsteen Center for American Music

== Related links ==
- Official website
- Design area
- MGSA sculpture
- Art portal
- Rutgers University
