= Dear Evan Hansen (film) =

2021 American coming-of-age musical film by Stephen Chbosky

- Theatrical release poster
- Directed by: Stephen Chbosky
- Screenplay by: Steven Levenson
- Based on: Dear Evan Hansen by: Steven Levenson; Benj Pasek; Justin Paul
- Produced by: Marc Platt; Adam Siegel
- Starring: Ben Platt; Kaitlyn Dever; Amandla Stenberg; Nik Dodani; Colton Ryan; Danny Pino; Julianne Moore; Amy Adams
- Cinematography: Brandon Trost
- Edited by: Anne McCabe
- Music by: Dan Romer (score); Justin Paul (score and songs); Benj Pasek (songs)
- Production companies: Perfect World Pictures; Marc Platt Productions
- Distributed by: Universal Pictures
- Release dates: September 9, 2021 (TIFF); September 24, 2021 (United States)
- Running time: 137 minutes
- Country: United States
- Language: English
- Budget: $27–28 million
- Box office: $19.1 million

Dear Evan Hansen is a 2021 American coming-of-age musical film directed by Stephen Chbosky and written by Steven Levenson, based on the 2015 stage musical. Ben Platt plays Evan Hansen, reprising the performance he originated on stage. The cast also includes Kaitlyn Dever, Amandla Stenberg, Nik Dodani, Colton Ryan, Danny Pino, Julianne Moore, and Amy Adams.

Dear Evan Hansen premiered at the Toronto International Film Festival on September 9, 2021, and was released in the United States on September 24 by Universal Pictures. The film underperformed at the box office, grossing $19 million against a $27–28 million budget, and received generally negative reviews from critics. Some of the criticism was aimed at the casting of then 27-year-old Platt as a high school student, which some attributed to nepotism, as his father Marc Platt was a producer on the film.

== Plot ==
Seventeen-year-old Evan Hansen lives with social anxiety and depression. His therapist Dr. Sherman recommends that he write letters to himself detailing why "today will be a good day." Evan's mother, Heidi, suggests that he ask people to sign his cast, after Evan had fallen out of a tree and broken his arm, to try and make friends. At school, Evan writes his letter to himself, wondering whether anyone would notice if he disappeared.

Evan's classmate, Connor Murphy, offers to sign his cast, taking up a lot of space. He finds Evan's letter and becomes furious at the mention of his sister, Zoe, who he learns Evan is attracted to. Believing that Evan wrote the letter to provoke him, Connor storms out with the letter in hand. Three days later, Evan is called to the principal's office and is told by Connor's parents, Cynthia and Larry, that Connor died by suicide. Despite Evan's attempts to tell the truth, the two misinterpret the letter Connor stole as a suicide note addressed to Evan, with Connor's name on his cast solidifying their belief.

Evan is invited to the Murphys' house for dinner. Under pressure from Cynthia, he invents a friendship between himself and Connor, manufacturing a story about breaking his arm while with Connor at an orchard the Murphys visited. Evan enlists his family friend, Jared, in fabricating backdated emails between him and Connor to confirm his story. Zoe wonders why Connor included her name in his suicide note due to past experiences. Evan, still unable to tell the truth, tells Zoe all the reasons he loves her, pretending the reasons were from Connor's perspective.

Alana Beck, a classmate with social issues similar to Evan's, proposes "The Connor Project," a student group dedicated to keeping Connor's memory alive, with an upcoming assembly as the kickoff. At the assembly, Evan gives a speech about his loneliness and friendship with Connor, retelling the orchard story. A video of the speech goes viral, with Evan's words being used as hope to people dealing with mental illness. Zoe is overcome by the positive reception and thanks Evan for helping her family.

Evan and Alana launch a crowdfunding campaign through The Connor Project to reopen the orchard. Evan begins to neglect his mother, The Connor Project, and his therapy in favor of spending time with the Murphys. When Zoe comes over to Evan's house one night, she confesses her feelings for him and the two begin a romantic relationship. Meanwhile, Heidi shows up at the Murphys' for dinner, during which Cynthia and Larry offer to give Connor's college fund to Evan. Heidi declines, refusing charity from the wealthy Murphys.

When Alana begins to doubt Evan's friendship with Connor, Evan emails her his therapy letter, saying it was Connor's suicide note. Alana posts the letter on her social media in order to get The Connor Project to its funding goal. Online commenters question why Connor wrote a suicide note to Evan but not his family, accusing the Murphy family of mistreating him. Due to backlash, Alana deletes the letter from social media, but she is too late, as the letter had already been shared across the internet. During an argument between Cynthia and Larry, Evan comes clean. Devastated, Connor's family keep the truth hidden out of fear Evan will harm himself also still seeing him as a second son, and Zoe and Evan break up. Evan admits to his mother that his fall from the tree was a suicide attempt. Heidi apologizes for not seeing how deeply Evan was hurting and discussing how his absent father scarred him. Wanting to take responsibility, Evan uploads a video confessing the truth.

Alone again, he reads a list of Connor's favorite books and gets in touch with those who truly knew him. He receives a video of Connor performing music while in rehab, passing it along to the Murphys, Alana, and Jared. Evan meets with Zoe at the reopened orchard dedicated to Connor's memory. They reconcile, with Zoe telling Evan she wanted him to see the orchard, the one place Connor loved. Evan writes himself a letter, vowing not to hide or lie and encouraging himself to move forward in life.

== Cast ==
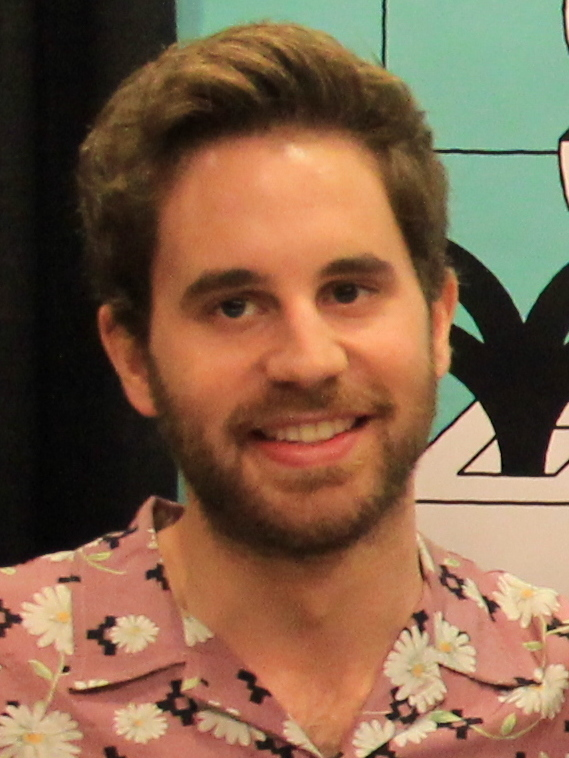
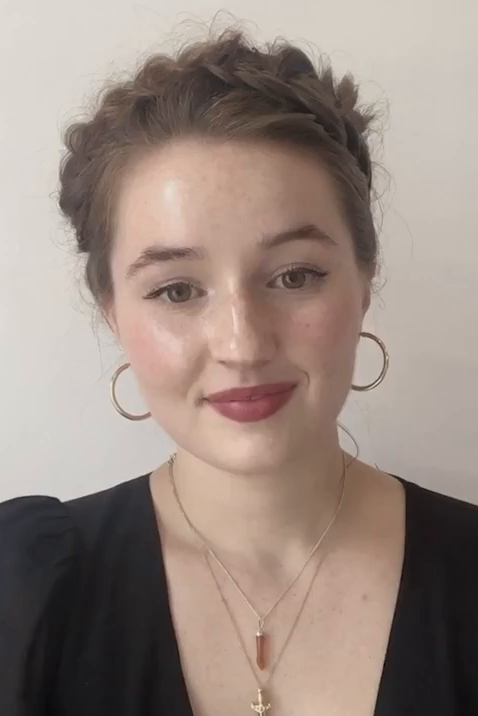
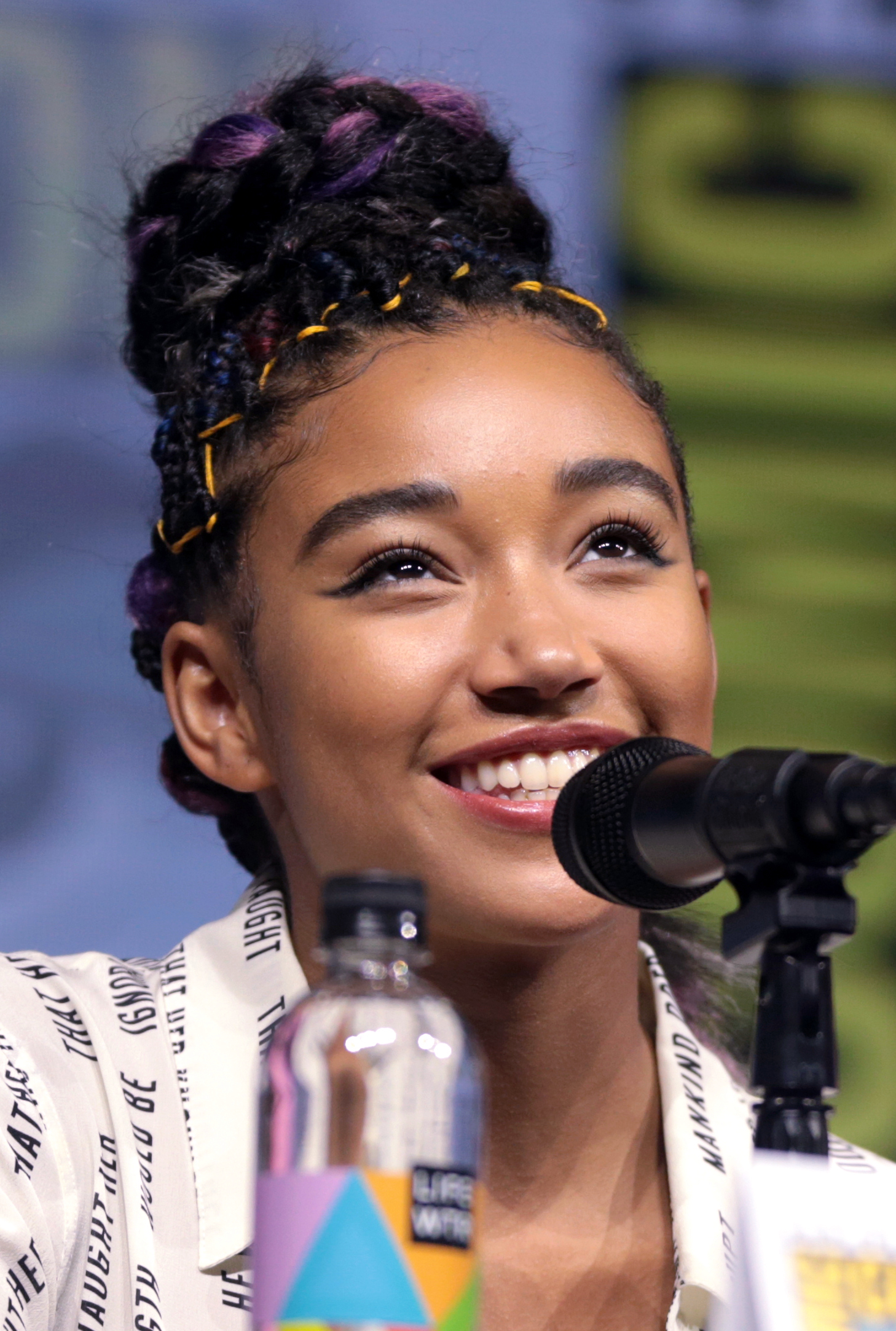
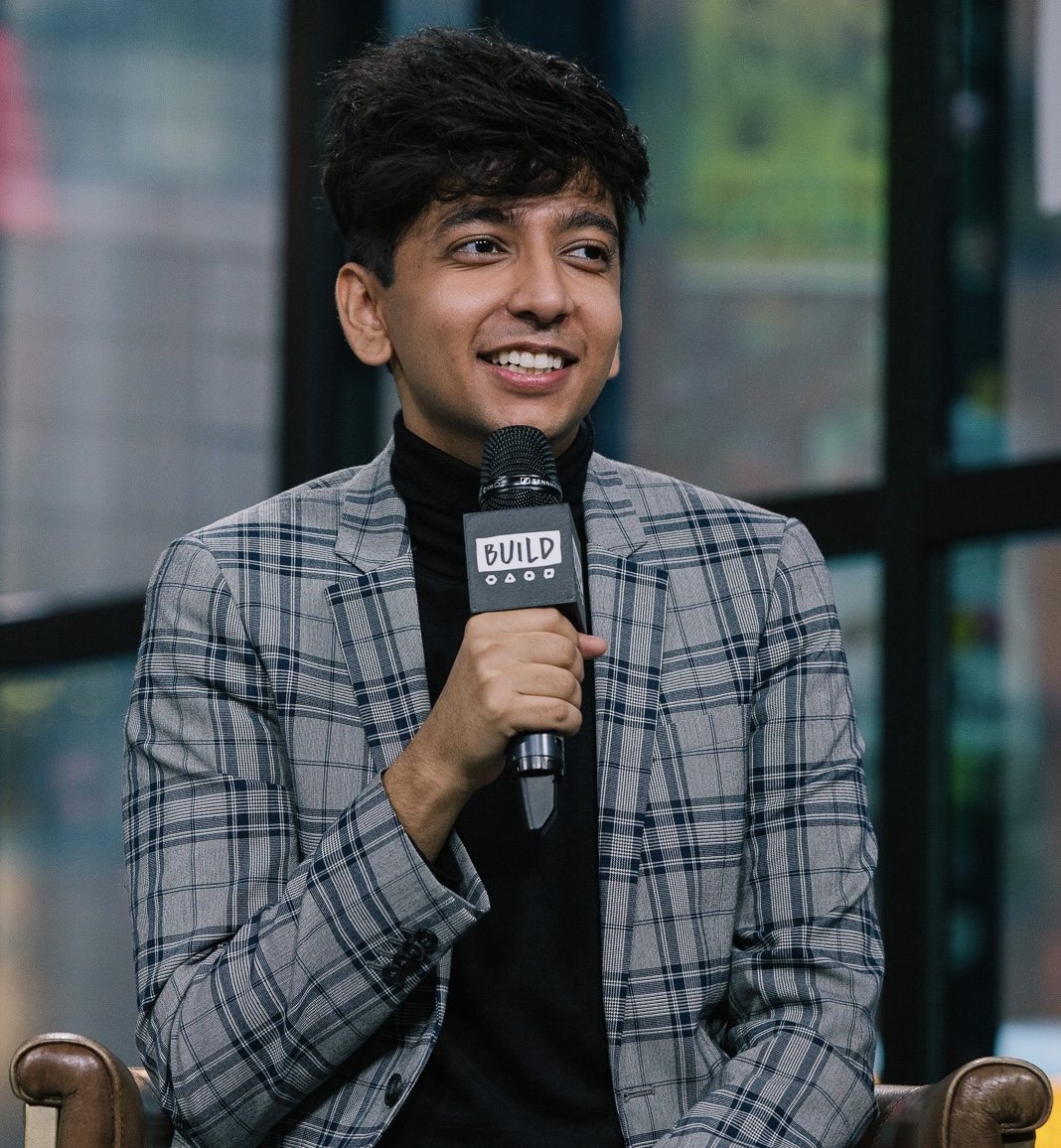
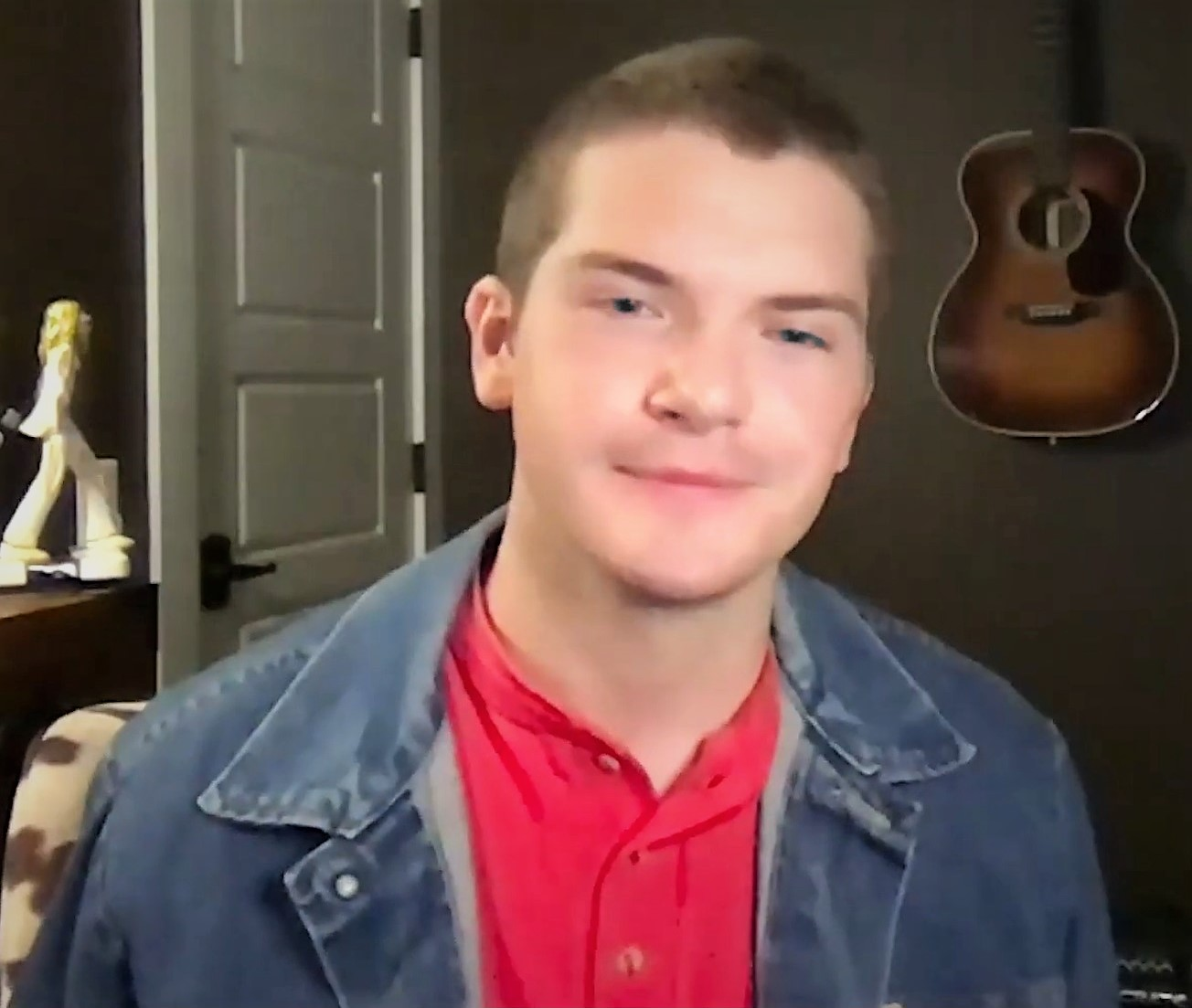
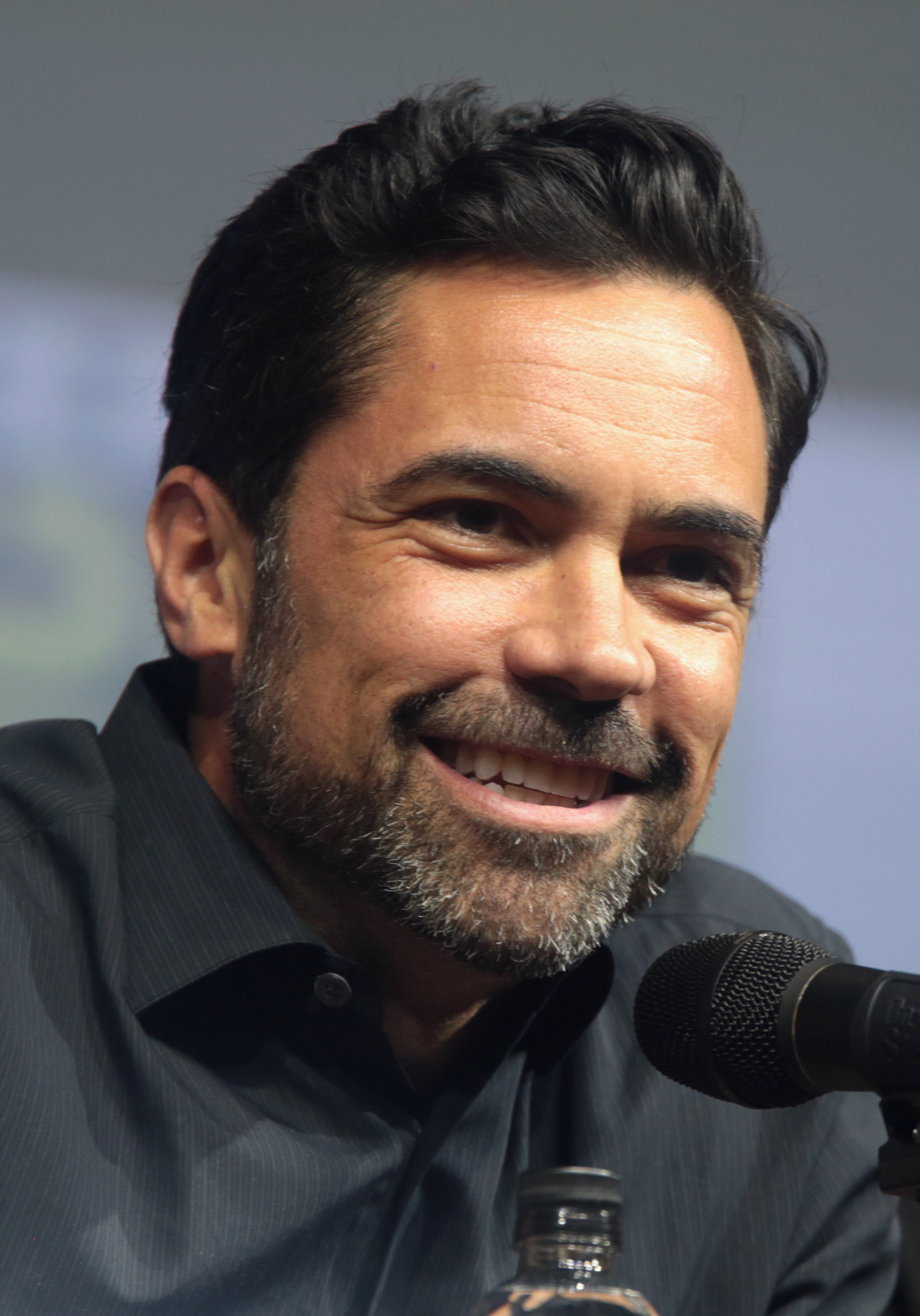
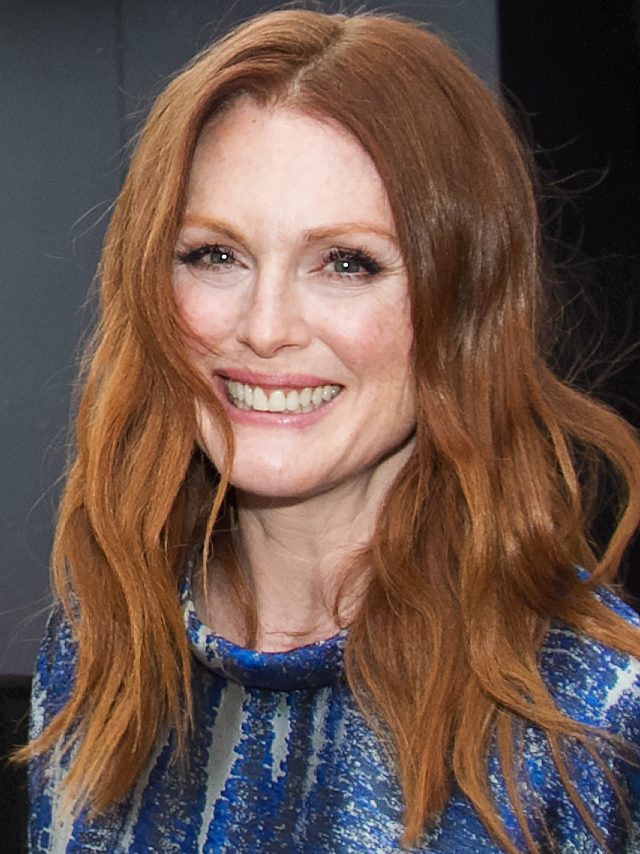
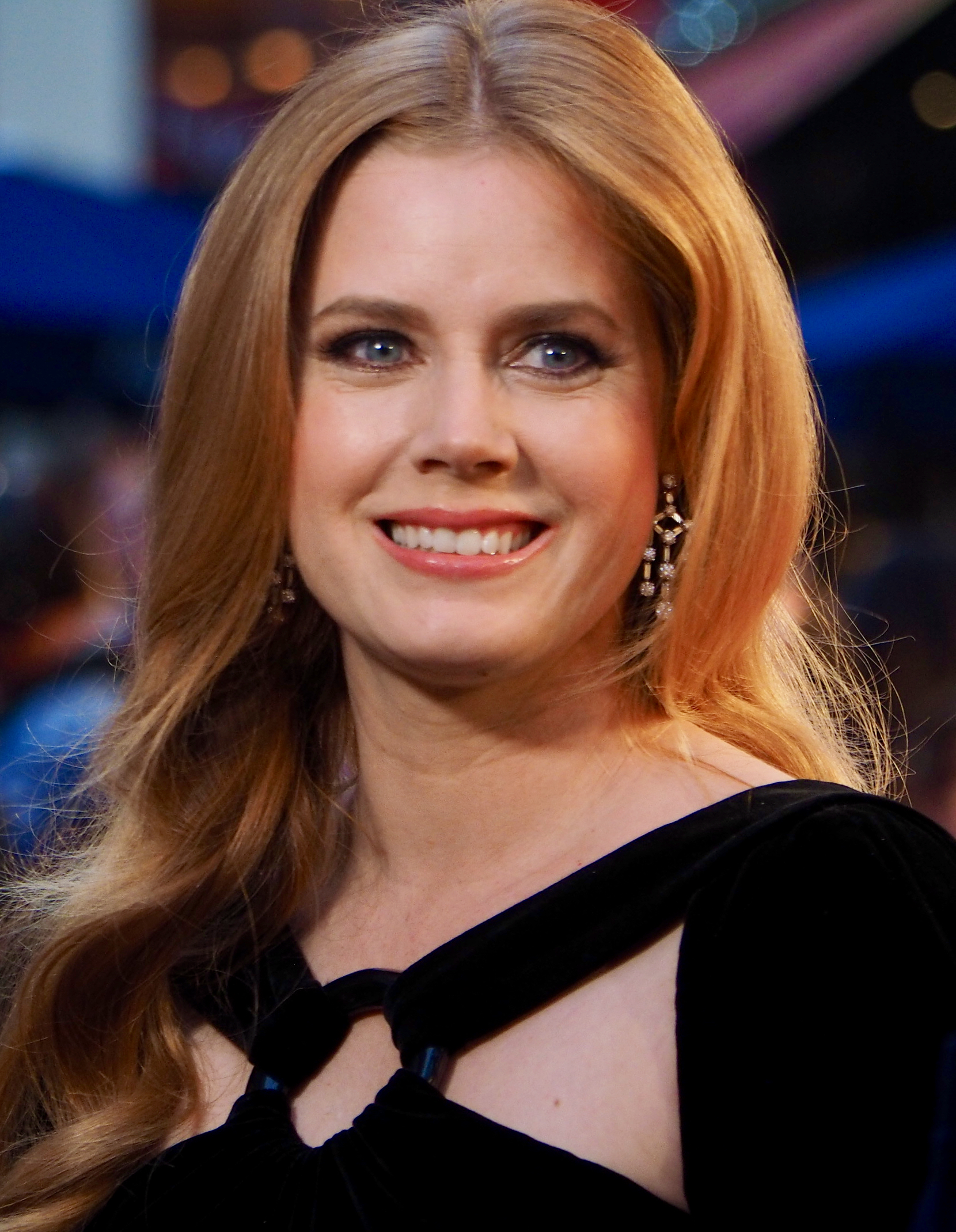
- Top row: Ben Platt (left), Kaitlyn Dever, Amandla Stenberg and Nik Dodani respectively play the roles of Evan Hansen, Zoe Murphy, Alana Beck and Jared Kalwani.
- Bottom row: Colton Ryan (left), Danny Pino, Julianne Moore and Amy Adams respectively play the roles of Connor Murphy, Larry Mora, Heidi Hansen and Cynthia Murphy.
- Ben Platt as Evan Hansen, a 17-year-old who lives with social anxiety and depression
- Kaitlyn Dever as Zoe Murphy, Connor's younger sister
- Amandla Stenberg as Alana Beck, Evan's classmate with social issues similar to him
- Nik Dodani as Jared Kalwani, Evan's friend
- Colton Ryan as Connor Murphy, Evan's classmate who commits suicide and Zoe's older brother
- Danny Pino as Larry Mora, Connor and Zoe's father
- Julianne Moore as Heidi Hansen, Evan's mother
- Amy Adams as Cynthia Murphy, Connor and Zoe's mother
- DeMarius Copes as Oliver
- Liz Kate as Gemma
- Zoey Luna as Leila
- Isaac Cole Powell as Rhys
- Marvin Leon as Skye
- Hadiya Eshe as Cherise
- Julia Chen Myers as Naomi
- Gerald Caesar as Josh
- Avery Bederman as Isabelle
- Swift Rice as Mr. Howard
- Tommy Kane as Greg
- Aymee Garcia as Librarian
- Mariana Alvarez as Mrs. G.

== Production ==
=== Development ===
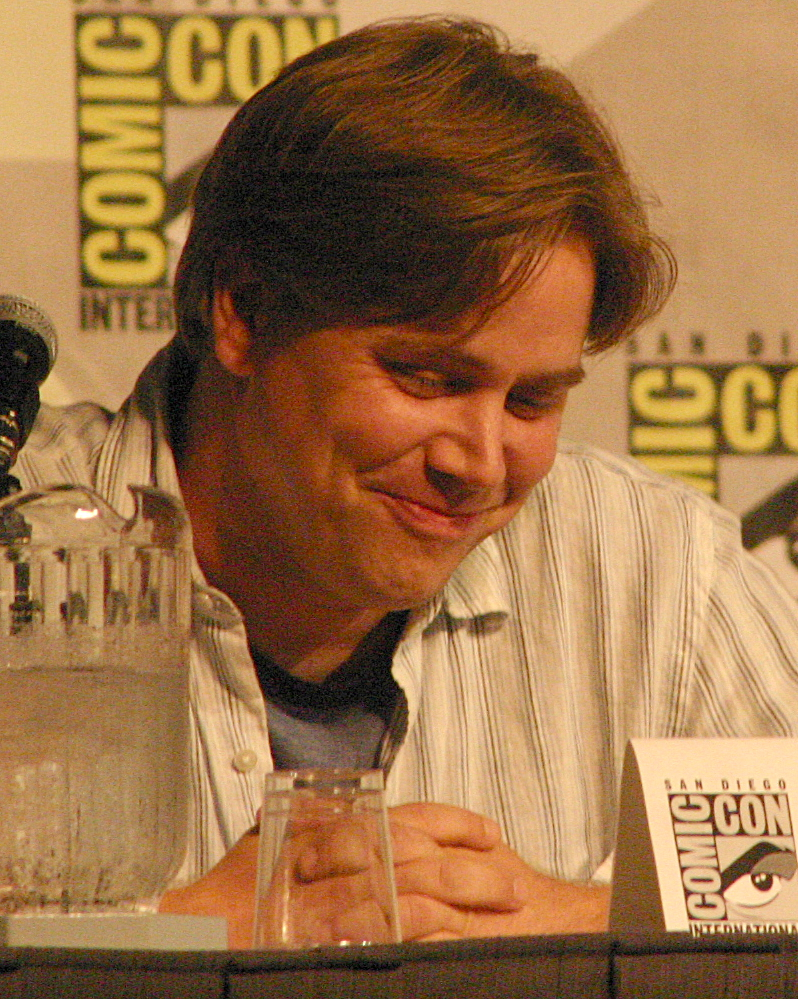
Stephen Chbosky, director of the film

Universal Pictures purchased the film rights to the musical in November 2018, hiring Stephen Chbosky as director, and the musical's writer, Steven Levenson, to convert the story into a screenplay for the film. Marc Platt and Adam Siegel would serve as producers, while the show's lead producer Stacey Mindich, and composers Benj Pasek and Justin Paul, would serve as executive producers alongside Levenson and Michael Bederman.

=== Casting ===
In June 2020, Ben Platt, who originated the role of Evan Hansen on stage, was expected to reprise his role for the film, and Kaitlyn Dever entered negotiations to star as Zoe Murphy. On June 18, 2020, Platt said that he intended to reprise the role unless the COVID-19 pandemic had delayed production. Stephen Chbosky explained that the film's main goal was to capture and immortalize Platt's performance, saying that "His understanding of the character is so complete and so profound. I couldn't imagine anybody else playing it. It's his part. I felt very strongly about it. And to me it was never even a consideration." He later explained that this was the reason why the film omitted the musical's opening number, "Anybody Have a Map", saying that "We're really on Evan's journey. It freed us up to meet all the characters through Evan. And it binds the audience to a way in Evan that is so valuable."

In August 2020, Kaitlyn Dever was officially cast as Zoe Murphy and Amandla Stenberg joined the cast as Alana Beck, a role that has been expanded upon for the film. That same month, Nik Dodani was cast as Jared Kleinman (now Kalwani) while Colton Ryan was cast as Connor Murphy, a role Ryan understudied on Broadway. Near the end of that month, Amy Adams and Danny Pino joined the cast as Cynthia and Larry Murphy, the latter of whom was re-conceived for the film as Larry Mora, their children's stepfather. In September 2020, Julianne Moore and DeMarius Copes joined the cast of the film. Moore was cast to play Heidi Hansen and Copes, in his film acting debut, was cast as Oliver, one of Zoe Murphy's friends and a new character created specifically for the film. That same month, Gerald Caesar joined the cast of the film as Josh, one of the high school students. In October 2020, newcomer Liz Kate joined the cast of the film as Gemma. In November 2020, Isaac Cole Powell joined the cast of the film, as Rhys, a high school jock.

=== Filming ===
On August 25, 2020, Ben Platt confirmed that principal photography had begun. It was shot in Los Angeles and Atlanta, with primary filming with the main cast taking place in September and expected to end around Thanksgiving. About making the film during the COVID-19 pandemic, Kaitlyn Dever said to Variety, "I'm very happy that we're able to make something so special during such a strange and sad and confusing times ... I have gotten used to the 'doing nothing' part of my job, which is just sitting and waiting for something to happen. Now, I feel like I'm really geared up for this and ready to go." Additional filming took place in Fayetteville, Georgia, which included scenes involving Ellison State Park. The high school scenes were filmed at Our Lady of Mercy Catholic High School in Fayetteville and Sandy Creek High School in Tyrone and B.J. Reece Orchards was used for the scenes that took place at the Autumn Smile Apple Orchard/Connor Murphy Memorial Orchard. Blackhall Studios in Atlanta served as the COVID-19 testing site for the actors and crew members on set. The vocal performances in the film were recorded almost entirely live on set, specifically to ensure that Ben Platt's vocals sounded as real and authentic as possible when he sings on screen. On December 15, 2020, Universal Filmed Entertainment Group chairwoman Donna Langley confirmed that the film would wrap production that month.

In a February 2021 interview with Drew Barrymore on The Drew Barrymore Show, Ben Platt described his experience of recreating his performance as Evan Hansen as "really special" and "bizarre", while also hoping the film will be "a really moving experience for a lot of different ages of people ... I think it's going to be particularly poignant in terms of everybody's inability and ability to reach out, and the ways in which we struggle to do that, and the magic that can happen when you do connect with someone and finally feel seen." On May 13, 2021, Ben Platt admitted he was apprehensive about translating his performance for the screen. "I think I was nervous about having to meet that same level in a medium that I'm not necessarily as instinctually comfortable in, and that doesn't necessarily lend itself to the same kind of fireworks as a live performance." Ultimately, Platt overcame his personal reservations because they felt like "small beer...Having an opportunity to share this story with, like, millions more people is ultimately much more important than my being worried that my performance won't be as good as it was on stage." Platt also confirmed he lost weight and grew his hair out in order to look "authentic" as a gawky and fresh-faced 17-year-old.

=== Differences from the musical ===
Nine musical numbers were removed for the film, including "Anybody Have a Map", "Disappear", "To Break in a Glove", and "Good for You", along with the reprises of "Waving Through a Window", "Sincerely Me", "For Forever", and "You Will Be Found".

The role of Jared was also reduced and the character of Alana expanded. Material involving Evan seeing visions of Connor telling him to push forward with the lies and keep his memory alive were also cut. Larry's relationship with Connor was changed from father to stepfather. Zoe and Evan also start their relationship during the song "You Will Be Found" in the stage version, but in the film, it is implied that their relationship starts during "Only Us", as flash forwards are seen of the two characters going to prom and an amusement park. The ending was also altered for the film. Jared Kleinman's last name was changed from Kleinman to Kalwani to accommodate Nik Dodani's casting.

== Music ==
The film featured several songs from the musical, performed by the ensemble cast, with the exception of four songs: "Anybody Have a Map?", "Disappear", "To Break In A Glove" and "Good For You". Chbosky admitted to changing the screenplay in order to narrate the story from Evan's perspective as part of the goal to capture Ben Platt's performance, which led to the songs being excluded. Amandla Stenberg wrote an original track "The Anonymous Ones", with Pasek and Paul. The soundtrack featured 16 tracks, with cover versions of the tracks "You Will Be Found", "Waving Through a Window", "Only Us" and "A Little Closer". The covers were performed by popular artists, such as Sam Smith, SZA, Summer Walker, Carrie Underwood, Dan + Shay, Finneas O'Connell and Tori Kelly. Many of the tracks were released as singles (including the covers), before the full soundtrack was released by Interscope Records on September 24, 2021.

== Release ==
The film had its world premiere as the Opening Night Gala Presentation of the 2021 Toronto International Film Festival on September 9, 2021, both virtually and in-theatre at the Princess of Wales Theatre and Roy Thomson Hall. Upon the announcement of its premiere, TIFF's co-head and artistic director Cameron Bailey remarked "There was no question that Dear Evan Hansen was the ideal film to launch the festival this year ... This film is ultimately about healing, forgiveness, and reaffirms how connected and essential we all are to one another. We couldn't think of a more important idea to celebrate this year as we come together once again to share the power and joy of cinema in theaters together." It held its Los Angeles premiere at the Walt Disney Concert Hall on September 22, 2021, and its Japanese premiere on November 8, 2021, as the closing night film of the 2021 Tokyo International Film Festival.

=== Theatrical and home media ===
It was released theatrically on September 24, 2021. An early screening with a preceding live Q&A with the cast, presented by Fathom Events, took place in select theaters across the United States on September 23, 2021. On September 8, 2021, it was announced that the film would also be screened in IMAX and Dolby Cinema. Tickets went on sale two days later. It was made available on premium video-on-demand platforms on November 23, 2021, and released on Blu-ray and DVD on December 7, 2021, by Universal Pictures Home Entertainment/Studio Distribution Services. The film was released on HBO Max on May 6, 2022.

=== Marketing ===
Ben Platt's appearance as Evan Hansen was met with harsh criticism from viewers upon the release of the film's first trailer.

The first trailer was released online on May 18, 2021. The appearance of the character of Evan Hansen was met with criticism, with viewers commenting that Platt, at age 27, looked too old to play a teenager. Platt dismissed the response, comparing his age to those of actors who played high school students in the 1978 film Grease.

Four houseguests in the Big Brother 23 house saw an early screening, even before the world premiere, as a reward for winning the 'Power of Veto' competition; that episode aired on CBS on September 1, 2021. Additionally, Platt performed "You Will Be Found" on NBC's America's Got Talent the same day, as well as "Waving Through a Window" on The Tonight Show Starring Jimmy Fallon on September 15, 2021, to promote the film.

The final trailer for the film was released online on September 16, 2021.

== Reception ==
=== Box office ===
Dear Evan Hansen grossed $15 million in the domestic box office and $4.1 million internationally for a total of $19.1 million.

In the United States and Canada, Dear Evan Hansen was projected to gross $9–11 million from 3,364 theaters in its opening weekend. It grossed $3.3 million on its first day, including $800,000 from Thursday previews. It went on to underperform with a debut of $7.5 million, finishing second behind holdover Shang-Chi and the Legend of the Ten Rings. Rebecca Rubin of Variety attributed the film's underperformance to poor reviews and some moviegoers' reluctance to go to theaters during the COVID-19 pandemic. Anthony D'Alessandro of Deadline Hollywood suggested that the film may have been more immediately profitable had it been released onto NBCUniversal's streaming service Peacock, but added, "when the movies don't work at the box office, they're equally lackluster on the service". It fell 66% in its second weekend, grossing $2.4 million and finishing fifth.

=== Critical response ===
On the review aggregator website Rotten Tomatoes, 28% of 281 critics' reviews are positive, with an average rating of 4.7/10. The website's consensus reads: "Dear Evan Hansen does a fair job of capturing the emotion of its source material, but it's undermined by questionable casting and a story that's hard to swallow." On Metacritic the film has a weighted average score of 39 out of 100 from 48 critics, indicating "generally unfavorable" reviews.

Scott Mendelson of Forbes lauded the film as an "engaging and entertaining passion play, strengthened by a deluge of onscreen talent and subtly directed in a way that opens up the play without calling attention to its stage-bound roots". Conversely, Valerie Complex of Deadline Hollywood dismissed it as "inauthentic", "shallow", and "an exercise in restraint. You either want to scream at the screen or shrink down in your chair from suffering secondhand embarrassment from these characters and their actions."

David Sims of The Atlantic opined that "almost everything imaginable has gone wrong [...] and the result is a film that [is] just painful to watch". Brian Truitt of USA Today called it inferior to other contemporary musical films releases such as filmed productions of Hamilton and Come from Away and the adaptation of Everybody's Talking About Jamie, writing, "Dear Evan Hansen frustratingly falls in between, espousing the importance of empathy and connection but in a disappointing package."

The performances were well-received, particularly those of Moore, Adams, Stenberg, and Dever. Explained David Fear of Rolling Stone, "there are enough of these goosebump-inducing, epiphanic moments courtesy of the actor that you see why people might love this film as well as cringe at it. Platt does not ruin the movie. He singlehandedly gives it a voice." Many criticized the decision to have Ben Platt (who was 27 at the time) reprise the role as 17-year-old Evan Hansen. Platt's acting was enjoyed by Peter Debruge of Variety, but he disliked the choice to cast "actors born the previous century" as high school students. Nate Jones of Vulture also called out Platt for being too old for the character, adding that his de-aging makeup backfired. He joked, "When he gets up onstage for the second act's big musical number, I wasn't sure if he was going to memorialize his dead classmate or speak on the importance of 401(k) matching."

The film's handling of its source material, particularly how the Broadway version's theatrical aspects mixed in with the film format, was generally not well received. Few critics felt the transition from stage to screen was successful, including Charles McNulty of the Los Angeles Times who still found the stage version better. Debruge was critical of the plotting, but gave the production crew credit for at least making some adjustments to the stage show's book, if not as many as would be desired. Less favorably, Dan Rubins of Slant Magazine and Bill Goodykoontz of The Arizona Republic felt the film needed more emotional depth for its serious themes to resonate; Goodykoontz highlighted Dever's and Moore's characters for being "the most realistically affected by what's going on in the story". Even more negatively, IndieWire reviewer Tina Hassannia and Katie Walsh of Hastings Tribune felt the source material's artifice and musical genre did not work for a mainstream film about mental health, suggesting a dramedy style would have worked better.

Adrian Horton of The Guardian, referring to Platt's presentation as a teenager, and the film's treatment of mental health, stated, "The movie asks the audience to not look at two elephants in the room, and unfortunately, no amount of soaring music can relieve that heavy a burden." Mick LaSalle of the San Francisco Chronicle wrote that Chbosky "needed to make Dear Evan Hansen less grandiose. He needed to pick up the pace and chop 10 minutes from the running time".

Michael Phillips of the Chicago Tribune said about Chbosky's direction, "Dear Evan Hansen preserves many of the selling points of its stage incarnation. But 'preserves' isn't the same as 'activates.'" Vanity Fair's Richard Lawson wrote the screen adaptation left the original musical's conflicting message of staying hopeful while considering Evan's hope unwarranted. He proposed that it should have really focused on "the false cheer and heavily synthetic inspiration content of so much contemporary online life". He also found Platt's stagey acting, specifically his "highly articulated tics", unsuitable for the film format. Issues of dissonance of tone were also noticed by Michael Rechtshaffen in his otherwise positive review for The Hollywood Reporter. He wrote that the non-musical scenes especially "struggle to find an agreeable balance between the theatrical and the melodramatic".

Some reviewers took issue with the film's handling of themes related to trauma. Mendelson felt it was unsuccessful at addressing the problem. Nate Jones of Vulture labeled it "distressing, messy, full of psychological manipulation and passive aggression", and Jeannette Catsoulis of The New York Times lamented that it "turns villain into victim and grief into an exploitable vulnerability". David Crow of Den of Geek bashed the film as only "paying lip-service to trauma and the lonely for its own benefit", calling it more uncomfortable than watching the 2019 film adaptation of Cats. /Film's Josh Spiegel also panned the social issues portrayed as stuck in the early 2010s, which were "untimely", "ungainly", and "excruciatingly awkward" around the time of the film's release.

In 2024, Collider ranked it number 5 on its list of the "10 Worst Movie Musicals of All Time," writing that the film "strips away nearly everything that made the original so successful, removing its stage-dependent visual style and bafflingly recasting Ben Platt to play Evan Hansen despite him being over 25 years old. This jarring switch in mediums only made the issues with the film's story that much more egregious, managing to annoy both fans of the musical and those unfamiliar with the original musical." The film's portrayal of Evan Hansen was also included on CinemaBlend's list of "32 Main Characters That Are The Worst Part Of Their Own Movies."

=== Audience response ===
Audiences polled by CinemaScore gave the film an average grade of "A−" on an A+ to F scale, while those at PostTrak gave it a 78% positive score, with 57% saying they would definitely recommend it.

Alex Wood of WhatsOnStage concluded in his review, "Spectators will likely land on one of three outcomes: it's either passably interesting (though overly long), rousingly novel or terrifyingly awful – all depending on whether or not you can empathise with Evan's so-called plight." Relish Mix, a company that tracks reactions on social media, rated the online response to the film at 5.5 out of 10, and said there were a wide range of conversations: "from joyous praise of the power of the theme coming from the Broadway play as a post-pandemic story of hope and inspiration" to less positive remarks which were critical of the casting of 27-year-old Ben Platt as a high school student.

=== Response by studio and cast ===
The producers and Universal executives were both "deeply disappointed" by the backlash to both the film and some of its elements but were also proud of the film. Steven Levenson said that he believed in the "value of criticism", but characterized critiques of Platt's casting as "cruel". In an interview with Zach Sang, Ben Platt responded to accusations of nepotism as his father Marc Platt had produced the film, saying "I think the reaction is largely from people who don't understand the context of the piece – the fact that I created the role and workshopped it for three years ... Were I not to do the movie, it probably wouldn't get made ... Of course, that's not true entirely ... All I have to do is let the work speak for itself."

=== Internet memes ===
Two scenes from the film, both featuring the character of Evan Hansen, went on to quickly become Internet memes right when the film became available digitally, mainly as a result of the public backlash against Platt's casting. These two moments include a close-up of Evan crying during the climax of "Words Fail", his expression wrenched and tortured, and the moment Evan runs off from Zoe Murphy in the hallways during their first meeting at school. Jameson Rich of The New York Times observed "The image of a crying Platt is already a much-iterated joke, and its thrust is, overwhelmingly, derisive. (On Broadway, Dear Evan Hansen balanced on a thin line between tragic morality play and light coming-of-age story, but the adaptation is a tonal pileup — "A Very Special Episode: The Musical: The Movie.") But being the target of the internet's scorn is not de facto a bad thing. When a meme circulates far enough, the underlying movie can gain what feels like cultural currency. The very fact that the images are not part of any intentional advertising actually lends them a note of authenticity. They are, in a perverse way, resonating on their own merit. Is there a better form of contemporary publicity?"

=== Accolades ===
Award	Date of ceremony	Category	Recipient(s)	Result	Ref.
Hollywood Music in Media Awards	November 17, 2021	Best Soundtrack Album	Dear Evan Hansen	Nominated	
Hollywood Music in Media Awards	November 17, 2021	Best Original Song – Onscreen Performance	Amandla Stenberg – "The Anonymous Ones"	Nominated	
Alliance of Women Film Journalists	January 2022	She Deserves a New Agent Award	Amy Adams (Note: Also for The Woman in the Window.)	Nominated	
Grammy Awards	April 3, 2022	Best Compilation Soundtrack for Visual Media	Various artists	Nominated	
Golden Raspberry Awards	March 26, 2022	Worst Director	Stephen Chbosky	Nominated	
Golden Raspberry Awards	March 26, 2022	Worst Actor	Ben Platt	Nominated	
Golden Raspberry Awards	March 26, 2022	Worst Supporting Actress	Amy Adams	Nominated	
Golden Raspberry Awards	March 26, 2022	Worst Screen Combo	Ben Platt & any other character who acts like Platt singing 24-7 is normal	Nominated	
