= Didier William =

Haitian visual artist (born 1983)

Didier William is a mixed-media painter originally from Port-au-Prince, Haiti. His work incorporates traditions in oil painting, acrylic, collage and printmaking to comment on intersections of identity and culture.

== Early life and education ==
William was born in 1983 in Port-au-Prince, Haiti. He grew up in Miami, Florida, and received his BFA in painting from The Maryland Institute College of Art. William earned his MFA in painting and printmaking from Yale University School of Art.

He was an artist in residence at the Marie Walsh Sharpe Art Foundation in Brooklyn, NY and has taught at the Yale School of Art, Vassar College, Columbia University, and SUNY Purchase. In 2016 he was appointed Chair of the MFA Program at the Pennsylvania Academy of the Fine Arts in Philadelphia. He vacated this position in May 2019. In the fall 2019, Didier was appointed Assistant Professor in Expanded Print at Mason Gross School of the Arts at Rutgers University, NJ.

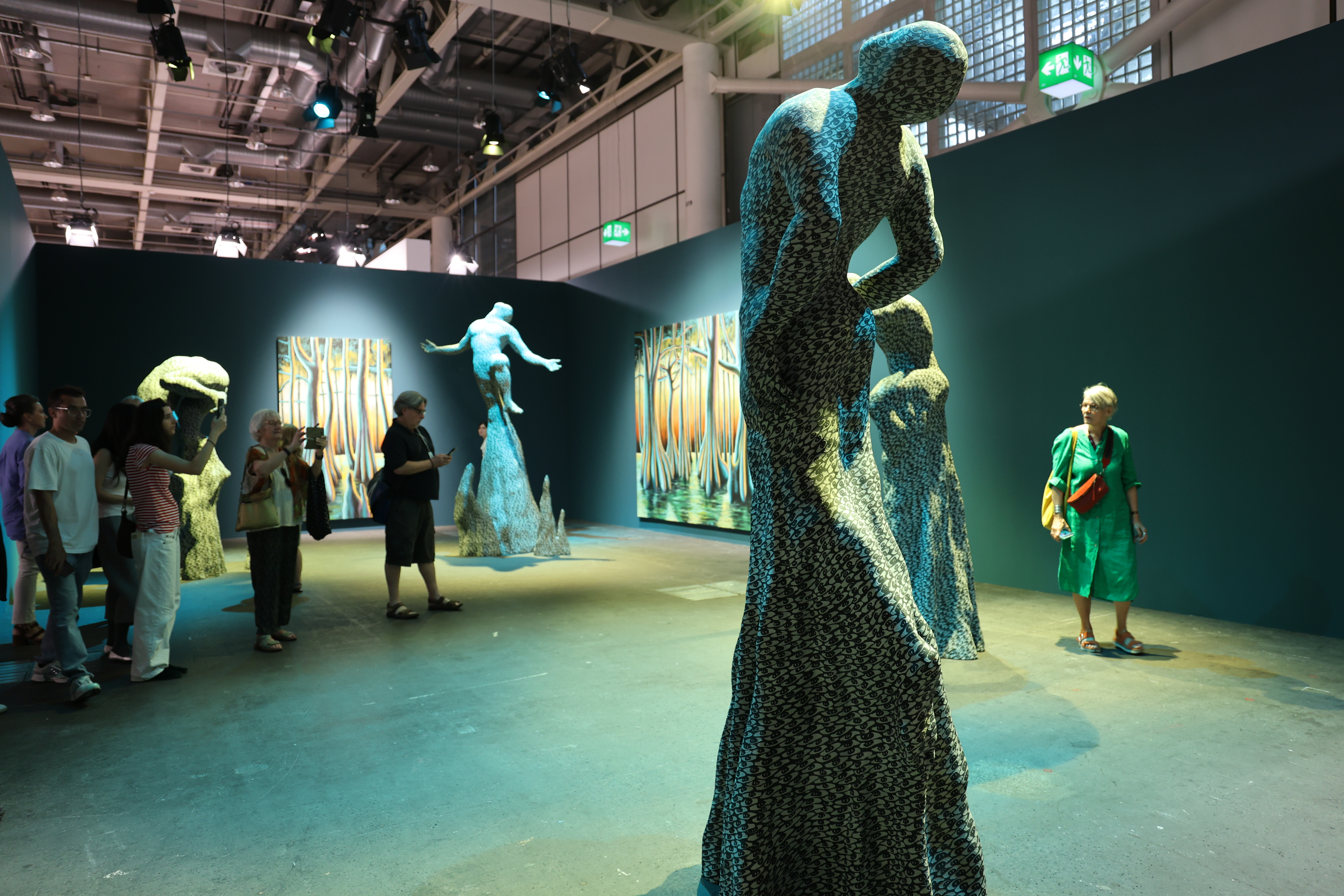
Didier William exhibit in the Unlimited showcase at Art Basel 2025

== Career ==
Didier William's paintings are concerned with blackness and other identities subjected to an othering gaze and socioeconomic oppression, drawing on his experiences of immigrating to the United States from Haiti. His works embrace traditional conventions of painting in their size and planarity, but integrate collage and mixed media to reflect to layers on meaning in each piece. Didier's exploration of the gaze, Haitian Voudou, history, folklore, and identity is expressed through works that depict human figures. His Curtains, Stages, Shadows series (2017-2018) was in part inspired by events surrounding Trayvon Martin, an unarmed teenager who was shot to death in 2012. He is currently working on a large-scale project related to Curtains, Stages, Shadows for 2020.

=== Exhibits ===
His work has been exhibited at group shows and solo exhibitions in various institutions, including The Museum of Latin American Art in Long Beach, Bronx Museum of Art, Frederick and Freiser Gallery, The Fraenkel Gallery, and Gallery Schuster in Berlin.

==== Solo exhibitions ====
2010. Didier William at Galerie Schuster, Berlin Germany

2015. “Camouflage” Hap Gallery, Portland, Oregon

2017. “Swarm,” PRIZM Art Fair, Miami, Fl (2 person show with Nestor Armando Gil)

2017. “We Will Win,” Tiger Strikes Asteroid, New York NY

==== Group exhibitions ====
2005. “Disegno: Contemporary Drawing Exhibition,” MICA, Kansas City Art Institute, Princeton University, California College of Art, Pennsylvania Academy of Art

2008. “Transformers”, Gateway/BlackBox Gallery, Maryland Institute College of Art

2008. “New Akademiks”, Galerie Schuster, Berlin Germany

2009. “Summer Exhibition”, Kravets Wehby Gallery, New York, NY

2009. “The Open,” Deitch Projects Long Island City, New York, NY

2010. “Artquake”, Renaissance fin Art, New York, NY

2010. “Nice to meet you”, Sloan fine Art, New York, NY

2010. ”I’ll let you be in my dreams, if I can be in yours”, Fredericks & Freiser Gallery, New York, NY

2011. “Intersecting Cultures/Virtual Worlds”, Underground Gallery at The Betsy Hotel, Miami, FL

2011. Momenta Art Benefit, Loretta Howard Gallery, New York, NY

2011. “Artquake”, Organized by Haiti Cultural Exchange, Brooklyn NY

2012. "Mark, Scrape, Wipe, Shape," Organized by Spaceshifter Projects and curated by Sangram Majumdar and Karla Wozniak, Brooklyn, NY

2014. “Improvised Showboat,” Brooklyn, NY

2014. “No more place”, Alferro Gallery, Newark, NJ

2015. “Bronx Calling,” The Bronx Museum of the Arts, New York, NY

2015. “The heart is a lonely hunter,” The Fraenkel Gallery, San Francisco, CA

2016. “Enlarged Fern” Moskowitz Bayse

2017. Pacific Standard Time, “Relational Undercurrents” Museum of Latin American Art, Long Beach, CA

2017. “Accordion Space,” Feigenbaum Center for Visual Arts, Union College, Schenectady. NY

2017. “Passenger Pigeon Press Anniversary Show,” La Maison D’Art, NY

2017. “Fold Ten,” C.R Ettinger Studio, Philadelphia, PA

2018. “Aesthetics of Matter,” Volta Art Fair, NY

2018. “Isness,” Morgan Lehman Gallery, NY

2018. “Strange Looks,” Gildar Gallery, Denver, CO

2025. "M. Florine Démosthène and Didier William: What the Body Carries," Frist Art Museum, Nashville, TN

=== Awards ===
2007. Morris Louis Award for Excellence in Painting

2006 & 7. Maryland Citation for Excellence in the Arts, Office of Senator Verna Jones

2007 & 8. MFA Student Fellowship, Yale University School of Art

2009. Toby Devan Lewis Fellowship for Painting

2009, 10, & 11. Hearst Foundation Grant Recipient

2012. Artist in Residence. Marie Walsh Sharpe Art Foundation Space Program, Brooklyn NY

2014. Artist in the Market Place, The Bronx Museum of Art

2018. Rosenthal Family Foundation Award in Art
