= Clifford Owens =

American performance artist

- Born: 1971 (age 54–55); Baltimore, Maryland
- Known for: Mixed media and performance art
- Website: CliffordOwens.net

Clifford Owens is an African-American mixed media and performance artist, writer and curator. Owens was born in Baltimore, Maryland, in 1971 and spent his early life in Baltimore. Owens is known for his works which center on the body and often include interactions with the audience and spontaneity.

== Education and teaching ==
Clifford Owens attended the University of Maryland, Baltimore County (UMBC), then transferred to the School of the Art Institute of Chicago, from which he graduated with a BFA in 1998. He received his MFA in 2000 from the Mason Gross School of the Arts, Rutgers University in 2000, and participated in the Whitney Independent Study Program in 2001.

He attended Skowhegan School of Painting and Sculpture in Maine in 2004 and was an Artist-in-Residence at The Studio Museum in Harlem 2005–2006.

Owens has taught at The Cooper Union, The School of the Art Institute of Chicago, and Mason Gross School of the Arts at Rutgers, as well as NYU, New York Academy of Art, and was a lecturer at the School of Art, Yale University in fall 2011.

== Work ==
At Owens' first solo show at the Contemporary Arts Museum Houston, he presented, Photographs with an Audience, a piece about how the history of performance art is intertwined with the history of photography. In it, he asked questions of the audience and those that had answered the same would have their picture taken as a group.

In his solo exhibition Anthology at MoMA PS1, Owens performed instructional scores submitted by black artists that he had invited to participate. One score written by artist Kara Walker, was withdrawn by her while the exhibition was on view but was performed by Owens three times at MoMA PS1.

== Exhibitions ==
Clifford Owens’ art has appeared in numerous group and solo exhibitions. His solo exhibitions include at On Stellar Rays Gallery in New York in 2008, “Perspectives 173: Clifford Owens” Contemporary Arts Museum Houston (2011), “Anthology: Clifford Owens” Museum of Modern Art PS1 (2011-2012), and "Better The Rebel You Know" in Cornerhouse, Manchester, England (2014).

His group exhibitions include "Distillation" in Fylkingen, Stockholm, Sweden (2003), "One Minute More" at The Kitchen, New York, NY. (2009), "Collected. Reflections on the Permanent Collection" at The Studio Museum in Harlem, New York, NY. (2010), "100 Years" at MoMA PS1, Long Island City, NY. (2010), "GNY: 5Year Review" at MoMA PS1, Long Island City, NY. (2010 "Radical Presence: Black Performance in Contemporary Art" (Traveling show) at Contemporary Arts Museum Houston (2012), Grey Art Gallery (NYU), Studio Museum in Harlem, and the Walker Art Center (2012)., "This Kiss" at Danspace Project, St. Marks Church. Legacy Russell and Clifford Owens. (2013), "Remains" at Fergus McCaffrey (2017), "Clifford Owens: Five Anthology Scores" at Baltimore Museum of Art (2019), and "Breathing Room: Bound and Loose" at Baltimore Museum of Art (2020).

== Collections ==
- Museum of Modern Art, New York
- The Studio Museum in Harlem
