= Cook Thugless =

American hip hop group

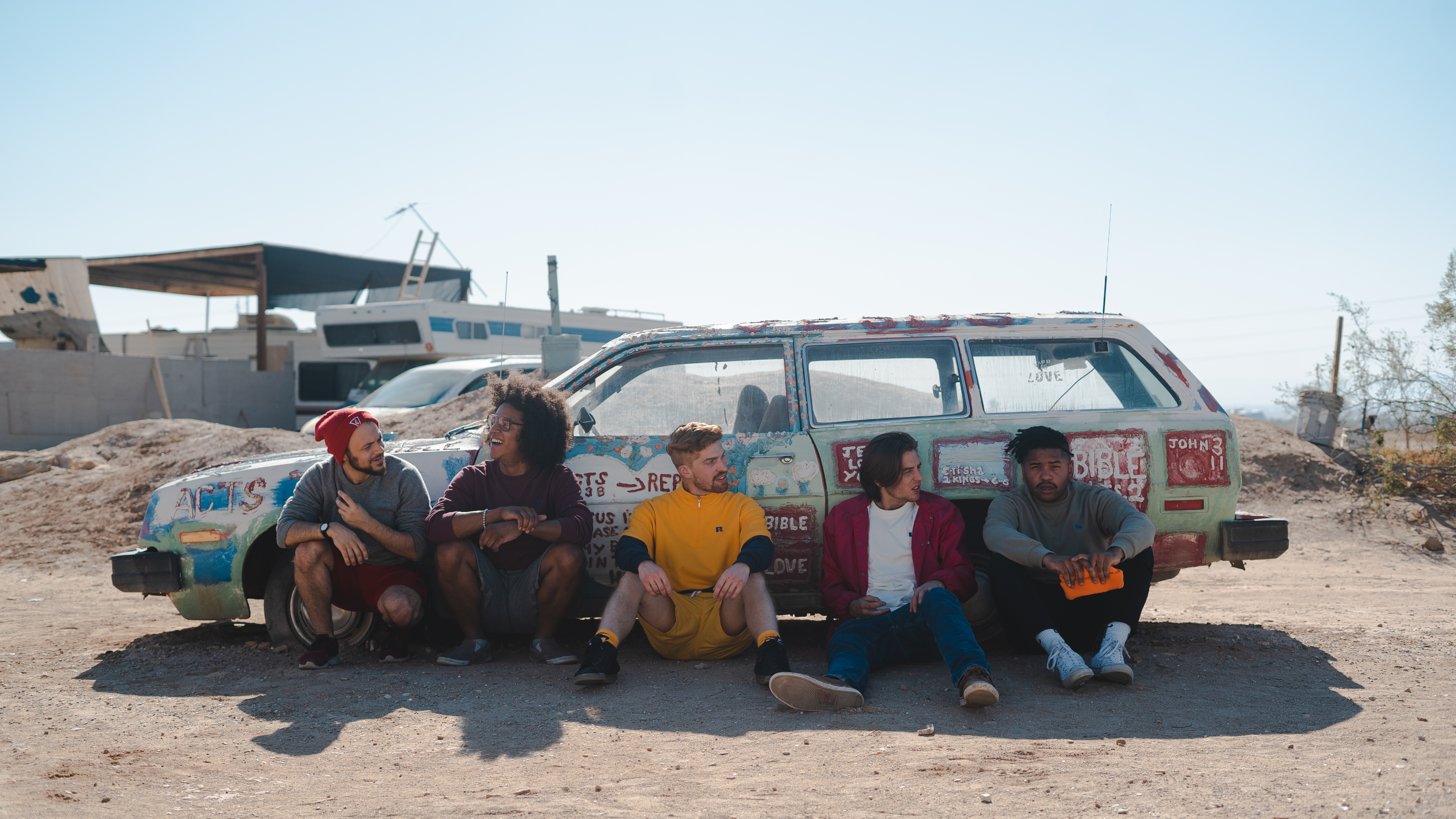
- Cook Thugless in 2019

Background information
- Origin: New Brunswick, New Jersey, U.S.
- Genres: Hip hop, alternative hip hop, rap, jazz
- Years active: 2012–present
- Label: Independent
- Members: Jean Louis Droulers; Jack Blerry; J-Titty; James Mehrkens; Keith Lalley; Riley Byrne; Brian Clines; Koi Cola
- Website: www.cookthugless.com

Cook Thugless is an independent music collective and hip hop act formed in New Brunswick, New Jersey in 2012. Popular in the New Jersey underground music scene, Cook Thugless gained national attention with their 2019 single titled, "Lockjaw". The name Cook Thugless is a derivation of the Cook-Douglass Campus at Rutgers University where the group was formed.

== History ==
=== Origins and formation (2012–2013) ===
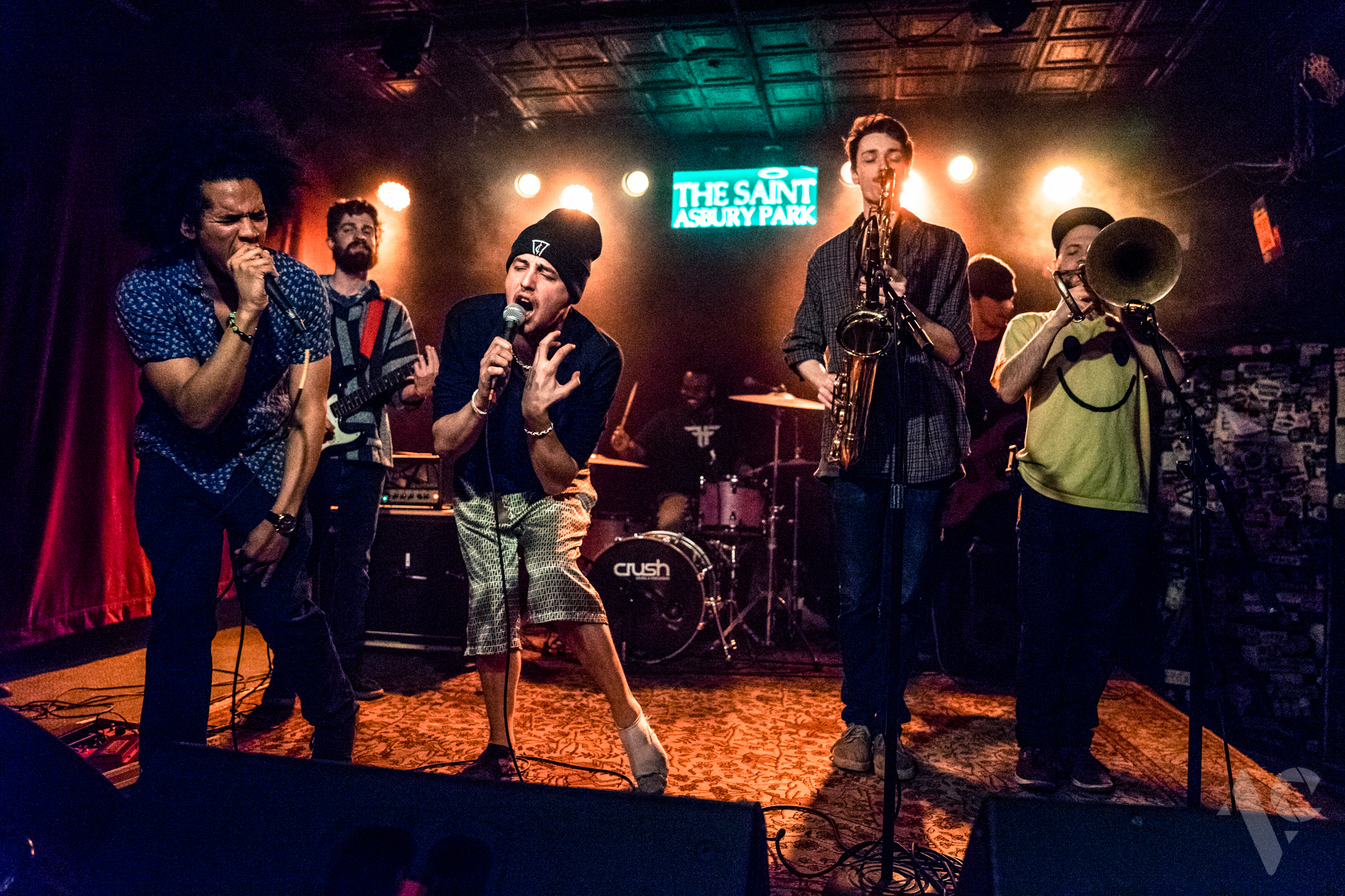

Jace Limb, Brian Clines, and Jeff Petescia met in Sparta, NJ, before attending Rutgers University together. Clines met Keith Lalley and Jean Louis at Mason Gross School of the Arts, the arts conservatory at Rutgers University. Limb, Clines, Petescia, and Lalley lived together in the Starkey Dormitory and named the band Cook Thugless, a play on Cook-Douglass campus where the band lived and attended school.

=== Space, Time, and Money (2013–2017) ===
On April 20, 2013, Cook Thugless released their first full-length album titled Space, which was followed shortly thereafter by the release of their second album "Time". The band primarily played underground shows, house parties in off-campus housing, and at smaller, less formal venues. Cook Thugless slowly but surely became a mainstay of the New Brunswick music scene. J-Titty (drums) joined Cook Thugless in 2015, just after the release of Time.

In 2016, Cook Thugless recorded their third studio album Money in Jersey City, NJ. Money is a concept album following Cook Thugless imagined rise to fame. Money explores the intersection of consumerist culture with music, and the recording industry. The album features a number of skits and storylines, in which the band's style and music are critiqued and changed to maximize their appeal. This includes a skit in which Jean Louis is directed to adopt the stage-name Fatty Puss. Money was critically lauded, with NJ music reporter Bob Makin writing, "It’s rare when a local unsigned act makes lasting art, but that is what Cook Thugless have done with Money..."

=== Luxe and lost in LA (2019) ===
Cook Thugless released their fourth album Luxe on January 4, 2019. The album's lead single Lockjaw became a break out hit on streaming services garnering more than 700,000 plays in its first month. The Aquarian Weekly named Luxe as "Record of the Week". The music video for Lockjaw features Brandon Flynn from the Netflix series 13 Reasons Why.

On Oct 7, 2019 Cook Thugless released an EP titled, lost in LA. The music video for the title track features cinéma vérité footage from the band's relocation from Brooklyn to the California.

=== Time in California and "Yikes" (2020) ===
After moving to California, Cook Thugless started 2020 by opening for fellow NJ recording artist Wyclef Jean at the Miracle Theater in Inglewood, California on January 24, 2020. During this time the group had begun recording music for a record label, which would eventually become disputed and the material unreleased. Simultaneously the members of Cook Thugless were living in the kitchen a rapidly deteriorating Anaheim influencer mansion, with the power cut off. These experiences shaped their next project, and audio recordings from this time are inter-spliced in their album Yikes.

Cook Thugless released their fifth full-length album Yikes on June 22, 2020. Allyson Klein of Elevator Mag wrote in her review of the album that "it feels threatening...electrifies the scene of any party, encouraging manic behavior," and calling the project "the epitome of trap." Aupium called the project "...glorious mutant of pop, punk, lo-fi, trap, and chaos where the choruses jump over the bursting cadence..."

== Discography ==
=== Albums ===
- Yikes (2020)
- Luxe (2019)
- Money (2017)
- Time (2015)
- Space (2013)

=== Live Albums ===
- Cook Thugless on Audio Tree Live (2021)

=== EPs & Mixtapes ===
- lost in LA (2019)
- Vacation Blend II (2016)
- Spontaneous Mixtape (2014)
- Homegrown (2021)

=== Singles ===
- Bad Luck (2020)
- Mosh Pit (2020)
- Dirty Blue (2019)
- Replay ft. CoolCompany & Dazed (2019)
- Untitled (2018)
- Thankful (2018)
- Pendulum Rock (2017)
- House Cat (2016)

== Personnel ==
=== Members ===
- Jean-Louis Droulers – vocals (2012–present)
- Jerry Sánchez – vocals (2012–present)
- James Mehrkens, a.k.a. Jace Limb – guitar, producer (2012–present)
- Keith Lalley, a.k.a. mistakeboi – producer, vocals, trombone (2012–present)
- Riley Byrne – bass, guitar (2012–present)
- Brian Clines – saxophone, flute (2012–present)
- Jahmar Beaubrun a.k.a. J-Titty – drums, vocals (2015–present)
- AJ Seferlis a.k.a. Koi Cola – vocals (2019–present)
- Jeff Petescia - vocals, guitar (2012–2013)
- Sam Tobias - saxophones, keyboards (2013–2016)
- Shyrley Rodriguez - vocals (2012–2013)
- Jack Doyle - narration (2014–2017)
- Ryan Cullen - drums (2012–2014)
- Mike Winnicki - drums (2012–2014)

== See also ==
- New Brunswick, New Jersey music scene
