= Looks That Kill (film) =

2020 American dark romantic comedy

- Film poster
- Directed by: Kellen Moore
- Written by: Kellen Moore
- Produced by: Will Phelps; Glen Trotiner; Austin Sepulveda; Jeremy Garelick
- Starring: Brandon Flynn; Julia Goldani Telles; Ki Hong Lee; Annie Mumolo; Lindsay Mushett; Tom Proctor
- Cinematography: Damian Horan
- Edited by: Spencer Houck
- Music by: Dean Hurley
- Production companies: LD Entertainment; American High
- Distributed by: Gravitas Ventures
- Release date: June 19, 2020
- Country: United States
- Language: English

Looks That Kill is a 2020 American dark romantic comedy written and directed by Kellen Moore. The film stars Brandon Flynn, Julia Goldani Telles, Peter Scolari (In his final film role before his death in 2021) and Ki Hong Lee.

The film was released digitally on June 19, 2020.

== Plot ==
The story is of sixteen-year-old Max, who has a strange condition: a face so angelic it can be lethal. He is constantly alone until he meets Alex, a girl with her own bizarre ailment who aids him on his quest of self-destruction. Alex suffers from a rare heart disease that causes her heart to grow if she feels any emotion (happiness-anger-sorrow-jealousy), because it can't process them.

The two meet after he accidentally kills his latest therapist with his face. Max wants to jump off a bridge to kill himself, but Alex talks him out of it by saying, "You jump, I'll jump." He pursues her and goes back to the bus stop they had used previously.

They have an adventure of young love, with Alex even taking him to a place she has never showed anyone else; the retirement home she volunteers at. One friend of hers who resides at the home, Esther, is writing a novel of her descent into Alzheimer's.

Their romance begins to weaken after they crash his best friend's school dance, where Alex begins to have some issues. While she’s in the bathroom, some bullies tear Max's mask off and kill his best friend's latest girlfriend.

He gets arrested but is bailed out and goes to see Alex in the hospital. There, he learns that there was never actually a chance of her becoming better and the medicine she was supposed to be taking halted emotions but since she started to fall for him she was willingly risking her life to feel them. She then asks him to kill her by letting her see his face. He freaks out and leaves, only going back once she is close to dying. He finally lets her see his face, which doesn’t actually kill her. He realizes that unconditional love means his face isn’t lethal, she instead dies of natural causes.

To honor her, he visits the nursing home and helps their friend write her novel and finally, he takes a bag of green colored jelly beans and tosses it over the bridge they first met as he walks away knowing what he'll do with his life. He becomes an angel of death, granting euthanasia to all who request it so they can look at his face and die happily and peacefully.

== Cast ==
- Brandon Flynn as Max Richardson
- Julia Goldani Telles as Alex
- Ki Hong Lee as Dan
- Annie Mumolo as Jan Richardson
- Peter Scolari as Paul Richardson
- Priscilla Lopez as Mary
- Monique Kim as Yu Shen
- Susan Berger as Rosemary
- Linsday Mushett as Tiffany
- Tom Proctor as Dr. Vin

== Production ==
In March 2018, Brandon Flynn, Julia Goldani Telles and Ki Hong Lee were cast in leads roles in the film, with a directorial debut from Kellen Moore, who also penned the screenplay.

== Release ==
In April 2020, it was announced Gravitas Ventures had acquired distribution rights to the film, setting a June 19 digital release for the film amid the COVID-19 pandemic. It was made available through video on demand platforms, including Amazon and iTunes.

== Reception ==
=== Critical response ===
Liz Braun of AWFJ.org wrote "Looks That Kill begins as a dark comedy, evolves into a romantic teen fable, and suddenly veers off into euthanasia territory. Kind of a tone whiplash situation, but a YA audience will probably find lots to like regardless." Lisa Payne of RedCarpetCrash.com said the film had "an interesting premise that didn't really go anywhere". Gwen Ihnat of The A.V. Club called it "a quirky take on the teen ailment drama".
