= DeMarius Copes =

American stage and film actor

DeMarius Copes is an American stage and film actor. He is best known for his Broadway credits and for his performances under the direction of Casey Nicholaw.

== Early life ==
Copes is originally from Fairfield, Alabama, in the Birmingham, Alabama area and began dancing when he was fifteen. As a child and teen, he appeared in theatrical productions at the Virginia Samford Theatre, Red Mountain Theatre and Shades Valley High School. He attended Rider University.

== Career ==
Copes earned his Actors' Equity membership in the 2014-2015 first national tour of Newsies.

In 2016, Copes performed in The Prom before the show made its way to Broadway.

In 2017, Copes performed in Mean Girls during its Washington, DC premiere. He made his Broadway debut when Mean Girls opened in New York in April 2018. He departed the production in June 2019.

Copes participated in a 2019 concert celebrating the Write Out Loud contest winners.

In August 2019, Copes joined the touring company of Hamilton.

Copes played Oliver in the 2021 film version of Dear Evan Hansen.

In 2022, Copes appeared in the original Broadway cast of Some Like It Hot on Broadway. Copes received positive reviews for his performance as Jerry/Daphne when he filled in for J. Harrison Ghee. He left the company in fall 2023.

Copes was cast as in the ensemble and later as the Jester in New York City Center's production of Once Upon a Mattress in 2024.
