= Laurie Steelink =

Native American contemporary artist and curator from Arizona (born 1960)

Laurie Steelink (born 1960) is a Native American, citizen of the Akimel O’otham Nation, a multidisciplinary contemporary artist, and curator whose work uses assemblage, installation, painting, and sculpture to explore deeply rooted themes of identity reconnection, healing, and cultural history.

== Biography ==
Laurie Steelink was born into the Gila River Indian Community, of the Akimel O’otham Nation, in 1960. During the Indian Adoption Project spearheaded by the Bureau of Indian Affairs (BIA), Steelink was adopted at 6 months old by Jean and Cornelius Steelink of Tucson, Arizona, who were academics, pacifists, and devoted to humanitarian causes. They had met while protesting the atomic bomb and were founders of the first ACLU chapter in Arizona. Cornelius's father, Nicolaas Steelink, had been an ardent atheist, anarchist, and labor activist, a member of the Industrial Workers of the World, and had spent two years in San Quentin State Prison in 1920 for organizing a union. Steelink's adopted grandmother was an immigrant and committed humanist who had escaped from revolutionary Russia and was one of the first women to graduate from the University of Southern California School of Pharmacy.

Despite a socially progressive and supportive home, Steelink describes her childhood as a struggle to assimilate in an environment where her Native culture was not welcomed or represented, and was drawn to visual art and music as ways to express herself, finding a community of like-minded outsiders she became active in Tucson's punk rock and alternative art scenes after graduating from high school. She played in several bands and created the flyers for their events. Through her performance and involvement in the punk rock community, Steelink discovered a sense of freedom and self-expression.

=== Education ===
After hearing about the San Francisco Art Institute (SFAI) from an acquaintance in Tucson who had attended, Steelink applied and received a Bachelor of Fine Arts (BFA) degree in 1984.

After graduating from SFAI, Steelink moved to New Brunswick, New Jersey, to attend Rutgers University's Mason Gross School of the Arts (MSGA) graduate program. There, she studied under the Fluxus artist Geoffrey Hendricks, who sparked her interest in the politically conscious, anti-commercialism of the Fluxus art movement, in which artists value humor, chance, and accidental play in the creation of works. Steelink received a Master of Fine Arts (MFA) degree in 1990 and, afterward, became Hendricks's studio assistant, which led her to become the archivist for the Gilbert and Lila Silverman Fluxus Collection in New York.

=== Gallery director and curator ===
In 1995, Steelink relocated to Los Angeles and became the registrar for the newly formed Track 16 Gallery at Bergamot Station in Santa Monica, founded by art collector, film and TV writer/producer Tom Patchett. In 2002, Steelink was promoted to gallery director and, for 14 years, curated and organized the gallery’s eclectic program of artists, artist collectives, and themed group shows. In 2012, Track 16 was evicted by the Los Angeles Metro from their space at Bergamot Station using eminent domain to build the Expo Line train station. The gallery relocated to Culver City, to a warehouse district, and operated as an invite-only private space that hosted readings and viewings. Around this time, Steelink had the opportunity to move to San Pedro and make use of a large live/work artist studio space. With less demand on her time at Track 16 and more time for her own art making, but also missing the interaction and community she had found with other artists at Track 16, she decided to open her own gallery in the surplus space she wasn’t using in San Pedro. In 2013, in honor of her adopted father, she named the San Pedro gallery Cornelius Projects.

In 2016, Steelink left her position as gallery director at Track 16 to devote more time to her own art practice and curating shows at Cornelius Projects.

=== Reconnection and identity ===
While living on the East Coast, studying the Fluxus art movement (1960s-1970s), Steelink—who had been curious about her own Native American ancestry—began researching her Akimel O’otham heritage. Growing up feeling like an outsider, Steelink wanted to know more about where she came from and, essentially, who she is. She was determined to find her birth mother and Akimel O’otham relatives. Several years later, in 2000, at the age of 40, Steelink successfully located her birth mother and family on the Gila River Indian Reservation in south-central Arizona. Witnessing her birth family's struggle with poverty, Steelink realized that she'd romanticized the loss of her Native upbringing, gained a new perspective towards the trauma of her adoption, and a renewed feeling of gratitude for the stability of the Steelink family.

Discovering where she came from and recognizing her ancestry led Steelink to engage with the diverse native community in San Pedro, the land of the Gabrielino Tongva. Building on that connection, she became involved in reviving the Many Winters Gathering of Elders (MGOE) in 2017, a four-day spiritual and cultural ceremony held at Angels Gate Cultural Center in San Pedro, California. She is currently a core committee member of MGOE, helping to organize this annual gathering and curating related exhibitions of Native artists at Angels Gate.

Steelink’s gallery in San Pedro, Cornelius Projects, became a hub for Native activism when she hosted a fundraiser for the Standing Rock efforts after the original venue canceled. The event, Standing Rock Is Not Over, March 11-25, 2017, billed as an art exhibition/events to benefit the water protectors, brought together 60 Indigenous activists and water protectors.

In the Spring of 2024, Steelink was appointed as a Native Scholar in Residence at Pitzer College's Community Engagement Center (CEC), where she mentored Native students and advocated for a dedicated Native American Studies department.

In the summer of 2025, Steelink returned to her birthplace on the reservation and her first home. There, she participated in the O’otham Weaver’s Circle at the Huhugam Heritage Center (HHC) in Maricopa, Arizona, a four-month-long program focused on traditional basketry that covered harvesting of materials, their preparation, and techniques for creating O’otham baskets.

== Artistic practice ==
Describing the thinking behind her work, Steelink states: “My practice is dealing with the complexities of division and fragmentation in my life from a contemporary Native perspective. I’m constructing a bridge using the tools I’ve received–my education and experience–and embedding them in a kind of conceptual offering with a critical gaze while paying homage to my Native ancestry. The process is an evolving decolonization exercise, a continuum where everything, including the materials, from re-purposed paintings, treated found objects, assemblage, and installation, is a constant rethinking, blending, and recovering. My practice is a form of healing. I want to extend my work beyond a static installation to create an embodied experience, incorporating mechanized works, sound, light, and video projections. Generating a dialogue surrounding the work through performative presentations, as well as acknowledging the First Peoples of the land and being respectful of the relationship to where the work is situated, has become another layer to my practice. To me, it makes sense to develop these kinds of relationships for the work to have any kind of meaningful existence.”

=== Exhibitions ===
Coming into Being: Gathering the Elder in Me, Laurie Steelink, 2018.

In 2018, Steelink arranged an autobiographical show at Angels Gate Cultural Center in San Pedro. The show was titled Coming into Being: Gathering the Elder in Me. The exhibition featured her paintings, drawings, video, ephemera, and family photos. Through these works, she told the story of her discovery of her Native ancestry as an anthropological investigation. She used display boxes similar to those found in a natural history museum. The show coincided with The Many Winters Gathering of Elders (MGOE), also at Angels Gate. In honor of the event, Steelink curated a photographic survey titled Good Way: What Does Your Land Mean to You?, which included printed matter from previous Gatherings from 1992 to 2017. This was assembled under the guidance of Louie Robles Jr. from the Acjachemen Nation and the Gathering of Elders Advisory Committee. The exhibition also featured a new portrait series of Southern California Indigenous peoples by photographer Tom Gugler. Together, these visual efforts and Steelink’s show created opportunities for dialogue and shared exploration of Native identity.

In 2019, at The Muckenthaler Cultural Center, Fullerton, California, Steelink participated in the exhibition Protecting Mother Earth alongside other Native American artists. As the original inhabitants of the Western Hemisphere, Native Americans have a unique relationship with the land, making the protection and conservation of the natural environment a central focus of their work.

Gathering Power (Indian market booth) as it appeared at the California Biennial 2022

In 2022-2023, Steelink’s installation Gathering Power (Indian market booth) was shown at the California Biennial 2022: Pacific Gold at the Orange County Museum of Art in Costa Mesa, California. This mixed-media installation uses repurposed walls from her previous market booths to explore her Akimel O'otham heritage. Through this work, Steelink addresses themes of Native American identity, art, and the history of indigenous peoples, particularly focusing on the Acjachemen people of Costa Mesa, where the show was set.

In 2023, Steelink presents a multimedia installation titled Spirit Is Alive, Magic Is Afoot at the Moss Arts Center at Virginia Tech in Blacksburg, Virginia. Through this installation, Steelink honors the spirit of activism and creativity embodied by Piapot Cree Nation singer-songwriter Buffy Sainte-Marie, naming the show after Sainte-Marie’s song, God Is Alive, Magic Is Afoot. The show features Steelink’s video of her shapeshifter sculptures and the landscape of her homeland in the Sonoran Desert, expressing her personal connection to place and transformation. She pays homage to the saguaro cacti by painting their image on the wall, demonstrating how her art is rooted in respect for the land. Steelink draws a parallel between her own experiences and the saguaro’s resilience, emphasizing her intent to reflect on survival and support within her environment.

Deliverance (Trickster), Laurie Steelink, 2000, inkjet

Continuing her exploration of resilience and transformation, Steelink presents herself as the artist-disruptor of norms, a teacher, and a catalyst for change, the trickster. In her self-portrait photo, Deliverance (Trickster), 2000, she appears as a rodeo clown, representing the traditional Native figure of the shapeshifter or trickster. As a shapeshifter, she reimagines and reinterprets previous works, making them more relevant and meaningful to the work’s context. This thematic thread of honoring tradition and place extends into her work, as seen in her Gathering Power II, 2022-23, which builds on the tradition of Indian market booths to invite viewers into a shared cultural space and becomes a focal point of the show. To further connect with the place, she pays tribute to the Monacan Nation, the First People of the land where Virginia Tech is located, by curating contributions from Victoria Ferguson, a Monacan Nation member. Ferguson’s works, crafted from natural materials and including clothing, pottery, baskets, and rattles, are displayed at the entrance of Steelink’s show as an offering of acknowledgment to the land and the people of the Monacan Nation.

=== Indian market booths ===
Indian Market Booth, 2021, mixed media. Assembled for the 99th Santa Fe Indian Market, Santa Fe, New Mexico, August 21 & 22, 2021.

Steeelink’s Indian Market Booth is structured around traditional Indian market booths, treating the market as a colonial tourist event and questioning her own authenticity. Her presentation is deliberately ironic—"crafted by a genuine Native artist". The work was originally built for the 2019 Santa Fe Indian Market, organized by the Southwest Association for Indian Arts (SWAIA) in Santa Fe, New Mexico. Although Steelink was unable to attend at the scheduled time it was later presented at the American Indian Arts Marketplace at the Autry Museum of the American West in Los Angeles that year. For various other exhibitions, Steelink has reconfigured the Indian Market Booth into a unique mixed-media installation, addressing themes of Native American identity, art, and history, which includes the recognition of the First and existing Peoples of the surrounding land on which the piece is presented, renaming the work each time it's been shown. In 2022, at the California Biennial at the Orange County Museum, it was titled Gathering Power (Indian market booth), and for her 2023 show at the Moss Arts Center at Virginia Tech, it was called Gathering Power II (Indian market booth), and In 2024, at Cornelius Projects in San Pedro, California, it was titled Gathering Power III (Indian market booth).

== Awards and collections ==
- 2020, Cultural Trailblazer, Los Angeles Department of Cultural Affairs, Los Angeles, California.
- 2022, Steelink’s work is acquired by the Escalette Permanent Collection of Art at Chapman University in Orange, California.
- 2023, California Arts Council Individual Artist Fellowship, Los Angeles County
- 2024, Arts United San Pedro/San Pedro Arts & Cultural District Grant
- 2024, Native Scholar in Residence at Pitzer College’s Community Engagement Center (CEC)
- 2026, Steelink’s work is acquired by the Carolyn Campagna Kleefeld Contemporary Art Museum in Long Beach, and California State University, Long Beach.
