= Joel McCoy =

American football player (1920–2007)

Profile
- Position: Back

Personal information
- Born: August 22, 1920; Birmingham, Alabama
- Died: March 8, 2007 (aged 86); Birmingham, Alabama
- Listed height: 5 ft 10 in (1.78 m)
- Listed weight: 170 lb (77 kg)

Career information
- High school: Shades Valley (Birmingham, Alabama)
- College: Alabama

Career history
- Detroit Lions (1946)

Career statistics
- Games: 10
- Stats at Pro Football Reference

Joel Lawrence McCoy Jr. (August 22, 1920 – March 8, 2007) was an American football player.

Born in Birmingham, Alabama, McCoy attended Shades Valley High School and played college football for Alabama. He played for Alabama in 1941 and the served in the United States Army Air Force during World War II. He played four season with Army Air Force football teams, including the 1945 First Air Force football team. The Montgomery Advertiser in 1945 described him as "a tall slender swivel hipped halfback who passes, punts and runs like a deer."

McCoy joined the Detroit Lions of the National Football League (NFL) in the summer of 1946. He played at the halfback position for the Lions during the 1946 season, appearing in 10 NFL games. He completed six of eighteen passes for 72 yards.
