= The Parenting =

2025 American film by Craig Johnson

- Release poster
- Directed by: Craig Johnson
- Written by: Kent Sublette
- Produced by: Chris Bender; Jake Weiner
- Starring: Nik Dodani; Brandon Flynn; Parker Posey; Vivian Bang; Lisa Kudrow; Dean Norris; Brian Cox; Edie Falco
- Cinematography: Hillary Spera
- Edited by: Josh Crockett
- Music by: Nathan Larson
- Production companies: New Line Cinema; Good Fear Content; Mighty Engine
- Distributed by: Warner Bros. Pictures
- Release date: March 13, 2025
- Running time: 90 minutes
- Country: United States
- Language: English

The Parenting is a 2025 American black comedy horror film directed by Craig Johnson and written by Kent Sublette. It stars Nik Dodani, Brandon Flynn, Parker Posey, Vivian Bang, Lisa Kudrow, Dean Norris, Brian Cox, and Edie Falco.

The film premiered on Max on March 13, 2025.

== Cast ==
- Nik Dodani as Rohan
- Brandon Flynn as Josh
- Parker Posey as Brenda
- Vivian Bang as Sara
- Lisa Kudrow as Liddy
- Dean Norris as Cliff
- Brian Cox as Frank
- Edie Falco as Sharon

== Production ==
On January 26, 2021, New Line Cinema put in development a horror-comedy project written by Kent Sublette, with Craig Johnson attached to direct. The cast was announced in March 2022. After a table read via Zoom on March 19, 2022, filming began on March 25 in Massachusetts. Nathan Larson composed the score.

== Release ==
The film was released on Max on March 13, 2025.

== Reception ==
On the review aggregator website Rotten Tomatoes, 47% of 36 critics' reviews are positive. The website's consensus reads: "Playing in the well-worn horror-comedy sandbox, Craig Johnson's The Parenting may need a time-out when it comes to reinvigorating the genre." Metacritic, which uses a weighted average, assigned the film a score of 45 out of 100, based on 10 critics, indicating "mixed or average" reviews.
