= Brandon Flynn =

American actor (born 1993)

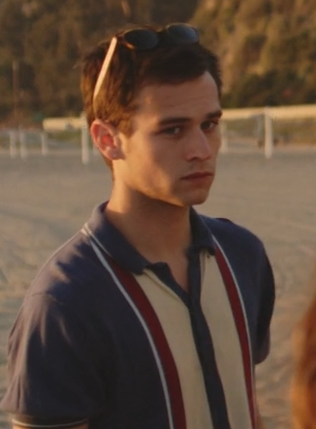
- Flynn in 2018
- Born: October 11, 1993 (age 33); Miami, Florida, U.S.
- Education: Rutgers University, New Brunswick (BFA)
- Occupation: Actor
- Years active: 2016–present
- Spouse: Jordan Tannahill (m. 2024)

Brandon Flynn (born October 11, 1993) is an American actor known for his role as Justin Foley in the Netflix teen drama series 13 Reasons Why (2017–2020). His work in film and television includes the series Manhunt (2024), Ratched (2020), and True Detective (2019), and the films The Parenting (2025) and Hellraiser (2022).

== Early life and education ==
Flynn was born and raised in Miami, Florida, where he attended high school at New World School of the Arts. He has two sisters.

Flynn graduated from the Mason Gross School of the Arts at Rutgers University, with a bachelor's degree in Fine Arts, and later trained as an actor at the Globe Theatre's Shakespeare Conservatory in London.

== Career ==
=== Film and television ===
In 2016, Flynn was cast as Mike the Intern in BrainDead. In 2018, Flynn was cast in the third season of True Detective as Ryan Peters in a recurring capacity.

From 2017 to 2020, Flynn portrayed Justin Foley in the Netflix series 13 Reasons Why. Foley, one of the lead characters through all four seasons, is a troubled yet ultimately redemptive character who starts as a popular high school jock with a traumatic home life and spirals into homelessness, addiction, and sex work.

In 2020, Flynn made his feature film acting debut in the dark indie comedy Looks That Kill, starring as a high school student whose physical appearance causes the death of anyone who looks at him. In the same year, he had a recurring role as Henry Osgood in the 2020 television series Ratched, a quadruple amputee and sadist who lives locked in his home with his mother, Lenore Osgood. He has starred in a number of other television series and films, including Manhunt (2024), a historical drama about the hunt for Abraham Lincoln's assassin John Wilkes Booth, and the horror-comedy The Parenting (2025). In August 2025, he joined the cast of Bradley Bredeweg's psychological thriller Deluxe Ocean View.

In February 2026, it was announced that Flynn would appear in The Last Temptation of Becky, the third instalment of the horror-thriller Becky (2020). He will also voice Boris in Alice Maio Mackey’s Our Effed Up World that is scheduled to premiere on June 19, 2026, at the 50th San Francisco International LGBTQ+ Film Festival.

He has a recurring role in Maximum Pleasure Guaranteed, an Apple TV series that premiered on May 20, 2026.

=== Theater ===
Flynn's New York theater debut was in the role of Luke in the off-Broadway production of John Kander and Greg Pierce's musical Kid Victory at the Vineyard Theatre in 2017. In 2025, he returned to the stage to play a young Marlon Brando in the off-Broadway premiere of Gregg Ostrin's play Kowalski at the Duke on 42nd Street. Also in 2025, he originated the role of Dylan in the world premiere of Jeremy O. Harris's play Spirit of the People at the Williamstown Theatre Festival. In October 2025, Flynn joined the cast of Good Sex, an experimental off-Broadway play. Created by Irish theater company Dead Centre in collaboration with collaboration with novelist and essayist Emilie Pine, the play first premiered at the 2022 Dublin Theatre Festival and was funded by the Arts Council of Ireland.

In 2026, Flynn starred as Jonah in Matthew Libby's off-Broadway play Data at the Lucille Lortel Theatre. In the fourth quarter of 2026, Flynn will make his Broadway debut in the play Here There Are Blueberries.

=== Other ventures ===
Flynn has starred in multiple Calvin Klein campaigns, including the brand's 2023 Pride campaign, the 2023 holiday campaign, and the Spring 2024 menswear campaign. In 2025, Flynn announced that he was working on a screen adaptation of Rent Boy, Gary Indiana's epistolary novel about a male sex worker navigating the seedy underbelly of 1990s New York City.

== Personal life ==
Flynn became engaged to his longtime partner Jordan Tannahill in December 2023. The couple met during the rehearsal of Tannahill’s off-broadway play Prince Faggot and married in New York City on October 12, 2024.

=== Political and religious views ===
Flynn is Jewish. In 2020, he joined the weekly protests at the Hall of Justice in Los Angeles demanding the resignation of then–district attorney Jackie Lacey for not holding the police force accountable for the murders of Black people in the LA county. He also became a supporter of the LA Youth Division of Black Lives Matter. He has been outspoken against homophobia and condemned the Trump administration's decision to prohibit transgender people from enlisting in the military. He voiced his support for marriage equality, urging his followers to vote in the favor of same-sex marriage in Australia.

== Awards and recognition ==
With 13 Reasons Why, Flynn was among the first openly gay actors to play a significant role in a major Netflix original series; in 2018, he received the Queerty Award in the "Closet Door Bustdown" category, which honors individuals who have made significant strides in LGBTQ visibility and representation.

== Filmography ==
=== Films ===
Key
| † | Denotes films that have not yet been released |

Brandon Flynn film performances
| Year | Title | Role | Notes | Ref. |
|---|---|---|---|---|
| 2020 | Looks That Kill | Max Richards | | |
| 2022 | Hellraiser | Matt McKendry | | |
| 2023 | The Senior | Micah | | |
| 2025 | Fucktoys | James Francone | | |
| 2025 | The Parenting | Josh | | |
| 2026 | The Last Temptation of Becky † | TBA | Post-production | |

=== Television ===
Brandon Flynn television performances
| Year | Title | Role | Notes | Ref. |
|---|---|---|---|---|
| 2016 | BrainDead | Mike the Intern | Guest role | |
| 2017–2020 | 13 Reasons Why | Justin Foley | Main role | |
| 2019 | True Detective | Ryan Peters | Recurring role | |
| 2020 | Ratched | Henry Osgood | Recurring role | |
| 2024 | Manhunt | Edwin Stanton Jr. | Main role | |
| 2026 | Maximum Pleasure Guaranteed | Trevor | Recurring role | |

=== Theater ===
Brandon Flynn stage performances
| Year | Title | Role | Notes |
|---|---|---|---|
| 2017 | Kid Victory | Luke | Off-Broadway, Vineyard Theatre |
| 2025 | Kowalski | Marlon Brando | Off-Broadway, The Duke on 42nd Street |
| 2025 | Spirit of the People | Dylan | Regional, Williamstown Theatre Festival |
| 2026 | Data | Jonah | Off-Broadway, Lucille Lortel Theatre |
| 2026 | Here There Are Blueberries | Rainer Höss & others | Broadway, Ethel Barrymore Theatre |

=== Voice work ===
Brandon Flynn voice work performances
| Year | Title | Role | Notes | Ref. |
|---|---|---|---|---|
| 2023 | Girls Like Girls | Trenton | | |

=== Music videos ===
Brandon Flynn music video performances
| Year | Title | Role | Performer(s) | Ref. |
|---|---|---|---|---|
| 2018 | "Lockjaw" | — | Cook Thugless (feat. Shyrley) | |
