= Linda Lindroth =

American artist and writer (born 1946)

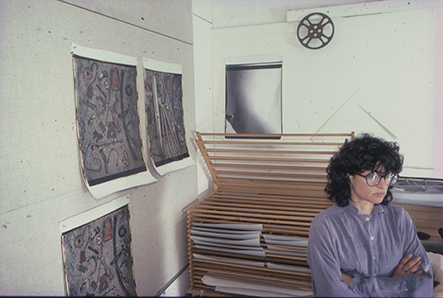
Linda Lindroth in Studio 1985

Linda Lindroth (born 1946) is an American artist, photographer, writer, curator and educator.

== Early life ==
Lindroth was born Linda Lee Hammer in Miami, Florida, in 1946. Her father Mark (Morris) Roger Hammer was a manager of a series of hotels in Miami Beach after serving in the United States Army Air Force during World War II. Her mother, Mae (Maisie) Lang Hammer, was a homemaker. When Lindroth was seven years old her father moved the family to Coral Gables, Florida, where she became an avid photographer of tourist sights like the Coral Castle, the Serpentarium and the Parrot Jungle with her Brownie camera. When she was ten her father, then a traveling salesman for White Laboratories, a pharmaceutical company, took her with him on a business trip to New Orleans, where she photographed the St. Louis Cathedral. When she was 13, her father moved the family to Springfield, New Jersey.

Maisie Hammer was diagnosed with bipolar disorder and was hospitalized frequently for depression. In manic episodes she would shred family photographs, including her daughter's photographs and early journals.

== Education ==
Lindroth attended Douglass College/Rutgers University from 1964 to 1968 where she was photography editor of the yearbook, wrote a column for the school newspaper and worked part-time at the Rutgers Division of Instructional Television. She convinced a graduate student to teach her how to process, film and made her own prints in the school darkroom, though there were no formal photography courses. She focused instead on traditional printmaking with Geoffrey Hendricks, who introduced her to the Happening scene in New York City. Lindroth graduated with a B.A. in Studio Art in 1968. She continued to take courses throughout the 1970s.

She studied photographic printmaking with George A. Tice at The New School in 1974.

In 1975 Lindroth heard that architect turned sculptor Gordon Matta-Clark was to teach a course at the School of Visual Arts. She enrolled in the course and studied with Garry Winogrand at St Johns/Germain School of Photography in 1976.

Returning to Rutgers in 1977, she studied critical writing with Leon Golub, taught photography courses, and received an MFA in Art from the Mason Gross School of the Arts in 1979.

== Early professional life ==
After graduation, Lindroth took a job as advertising copywriter for radio station WCTC in New Brunswick, New Jersey. In 1969 she left to work at Harcourt Brace Jovanovich as an art editor and later as a freelancer. Her photographs and mixed media work appeared on album covers including Firefall's Mirror of the World, and book jackets and special projects for many different publishers.

She met editor Joe Fox at Random House (a friend of Richard Heffner with whom she had studied at Rutgers), and worked as his picture editor until the mid-1980s including H.G. Wells: Aspect of A Life, by Anthony West.

From 1984 to 1987 Lindroth owned an art gallery in New Haven, Connecticut called Gallery Jazz, where she exhibited work by photographers and architects. From 1990 to 1993 she curated exhibitions for the Pump House Gallery, the municipal gallery in Hartford, Connecticut, and later for other institutions.

== Family life ==
While working at the Rutgers Division of Instructional Television in 1967, Lindroth met David George Lindroth, an MFA candidate. They were married at Rutgers Voorhees Chapel in 1968. In 1985 the Lindroths were divorced and Linda moved to New Haven, Connecticut with Craig David Newick, a graduate student at the Yale School of Architecture. Lindroth and Newick were married in 1987. Their son Zachary Eran Newick was born in 1990. He graduated from Princeton University in 2012.

== Career in photography ==
Lindroth's early photographs consisted of street photography, self-portraits, image/text, and mixed media, that she continued well into the 1990s. In 1974 Lindroth submitted her portfolio to the Museum of Modern Art for review, and John Szarkowski selected the first photograph for a permanent collection.

In 1975 a limited edition, mixed media artists' book entitled BOOK – produced in part in the course taught by Gordon Matta-Clark at the School of Visual Arts, and with her first grant from the New Jersey State Council on the Arts in 1974 – was purchased for numerous collections including in the Metropolitan Museum of Art and the Franklin Furnace Archive.

The U.S.I.S. invited Lindroth and seven other photographers to participate in a traveling exhibition in Italy and Germany in 1975.

In the early 1980s, Lindroth concentrated on two landscape surveys: one on the New Jersey Meadowlands and the other on Santa Catalina Island, California.

== Polaroid SX-70 and 20x24 photographs ==
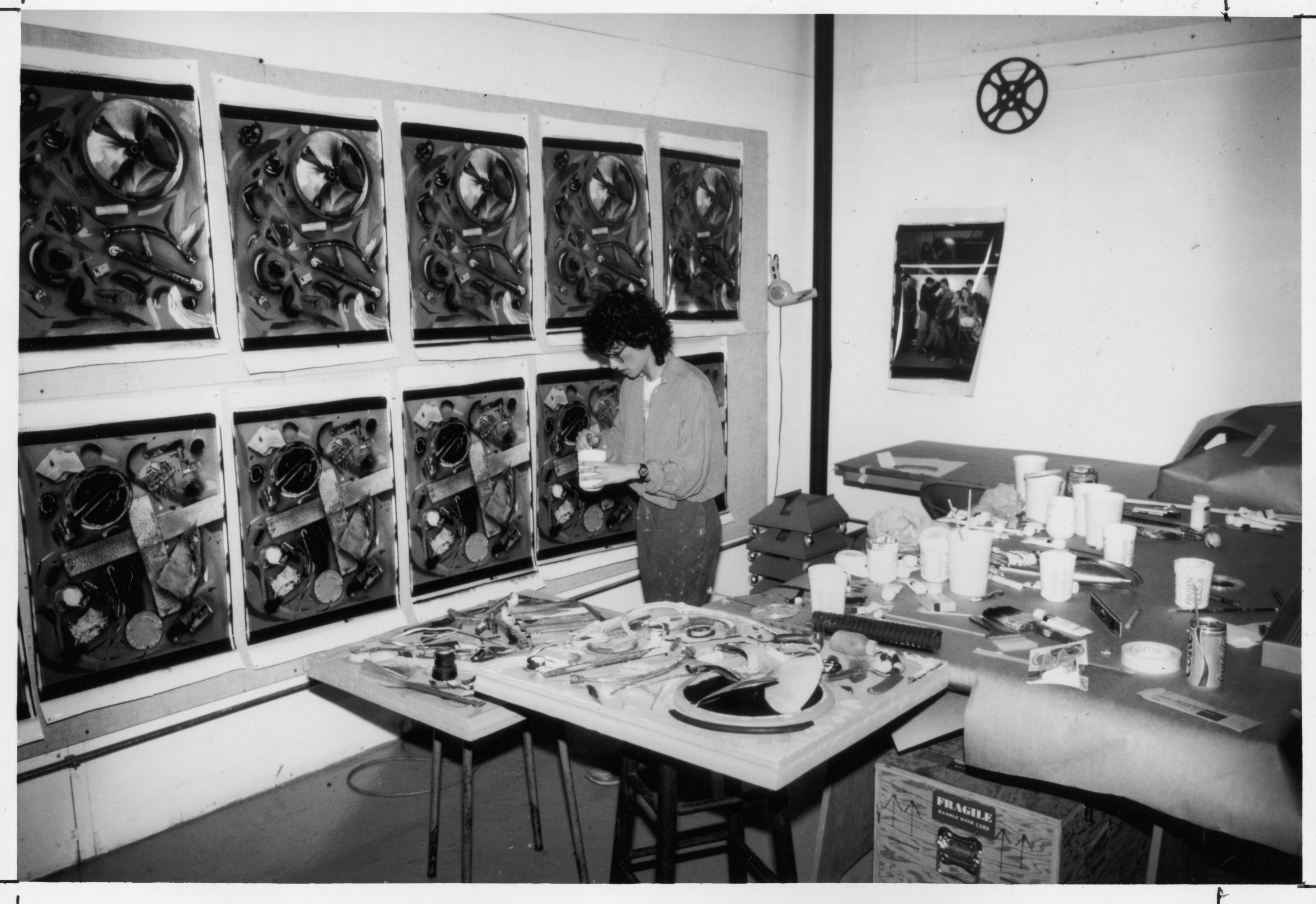
Lindroth in Boston in 1983

Throughout the 1970s and 1980s Lindroth worked in the Polaroid Artists Program using the Polaroid SX-70 camera and later the Polaroid 20x24. Her first ever solo museum show was at the Newark Museum in Newark, New Jersey, in 1986, of work done with the Polaroid 20x24 camera. Lindroth produced a series of three limited edition portfolios entitled TRIPTYCH I, II, III of Polaroid 20x24 images, copies of which are in the High Museum of Art and the Newark Museum. Other Polaroid work was exhibited in Canada and in the WestLicht_Schauplatz für Fotografie, Vienna.

Lindroth experimented with embedding Polaroid 20x24 images inside of large gelatin silver prints enlarged onto photo linen and stretched over wood frames. The resulting work was called the Bronx Zoo Triptych.

In 1995 Lindroth collaborated with Open Society Fund and Pen Pals for Peace to create Polaroid 20x24 photographs for a book of children's letters from Sarajevo entitled Dear Unknown Friend. The exhibition, Dear Unknown Friend, Children's Letters from Sarajevo, consisting of Polaroid 20x24 photographs of the letters, toured the Balkans in 1996 and 1997 and returned to the State Museum of Pennsylvania in 1999.

In 1988 Jonathan Edwards College of Yale University commissioned Lindroth to photograph six former, current and future masters of the college with the Polaroid 20x24 camera. The six were Beekman Cox Cannon, H. Catherine Skinner, Frederic Lawrence Holmes, E. J. Boell, Bernard Lytton and Gary Lee Haller. The photographs hang in the Junior Common Room. Other photographs have appeared in The New York Times.

== Installation art ==
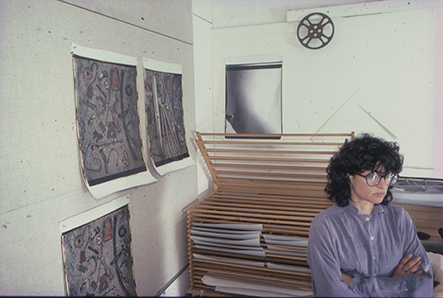
Lindroth in her studio in 1985; photo by Craig D. Newick

By the late 1980s Lindroth was doing installation art with Craig Newick, whose work had caught the attention of the Architectural League of New York. They were included in Emerging Voices in 1996 and received three Annual Design Review Awards in the magazine I.D. in 1990, 1991, and 1993. They received grants and prizes through the 1990s, including a Second Prize in the African Burial Ground Memorial Competition and a project for Storefront for Art and Architecture.

In 1995, with a grant from the Humanities Council of Fairfield University for the installation High Jump on the Moon, Lindroth made and exhibited her first large-format digital prints.

Lindroth and Newick did a mini-golf hole for DeCordova Museum and Sculpture Park in Lincoln, Massachusetts in 1995.

Lindroth has received grants and fellowships from the Connecticut Commission on Culture and Tourism in 1995–96, 2000, 2006, and 2012; the Foundation for Contemporary Performance Arts in 1989 and 1990; the New Jersey State Council on the Arts in 1974–75 and 1983–84; and the National Endowment for the Arts.

In 2002, Lindroth, an avid collector of vintage clothing, and Deborah Tornello published Virtual Vintage: The Insider's Guide to Buying and Selling Vintage Clothing Online with Random House.

Lindroth curated an art exhibition entitled 101 Dresses in honor of the centennial of the birth of Eleanor Estes in 2007 at Artspace in New Haven.

"The Artist's Studio", a short story, was published in artis in 2005.

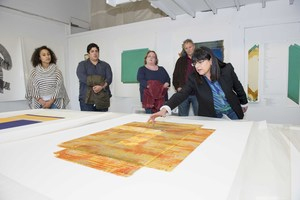
Linda Lindroth with her work in her studio; photo used with permission of Graham Hebel

== Trickster in Flatland ==
In 2011 Lindroth began her Trickster in Flatland series, exploring the subject of American commerce during the early part of the twentieth century by photographing the tattered remains of small boxes that contained products once invented and manufactured in the United States. These artifacts, chosen for their design elements and materiality, offer up evidence of the level of skill and anonymity of their makers. The work is strongly influenced by constructivist and abstract expressionist painters of the first 50 years of the century.

Lindroth lives and works in New Haven, Connecticut, and has been an adjunct professor at Quinnipiac University in Hamden, Connecticut since 1998.

== Bibliography ==
- Ballerini, Julia. "Exhibitions." Julia Ballerini. Joseloff Gallery, University of Hartford, 1994. Web. July 2, 2015.
- Brand, Stewart, ed. The Next Whole Earth Catalog: Access to Tools. New York: Random House, 1980. 487. Print.
- Brown, Turner, and Elaine Partnow. Macmillan Photographic Artists & Innovators. New York: Macmillan. 372. Print.
- "The Douglass Society | Awards for Alumnae | Alumnae | Associate Alumnae of Douglass College." Associate Alumnae of Douglass College The Douglass Society Comments. Web. July 14, 2015.
- "Exhibition Review: Christmas Greetings." Artweek 14.44 (1983): 11–12. Print.
- House, Suda. Artistic Photographic Processes. New York, N.Y.: Amphoto, 1981. 89. Print.
- Hürlimann, Hans. First International Trienniale Exhibition of Photography Exhibition Catalog. Fribourg: Musée D’art Et D’histoire, 1975. 238–239. Print.
- Kertész, André, and Linda Lindroth et al. "Artist's Statement and Photograph." Photography Personal and Public. Exhibition Catalog. New York: AIGA. 36. Print.
- Kreisel, Martha. American Women Photographers a Selected and Annotated Bibliography. Westport, Conn.: Greenwood, 1999. Print.
- Liebenson, Bess. "What Is a Book? Perusing Some Unusual Ideas." The New York Times, June 5, 1994. Print.
- "Linda Lindroth – "Family Portrait on My 32nd Birthday" – 1978 Gelatin Silver Print." Linda Lindroth – "Family Portrait on My 32nd Birthday" – 1978 Gelatin Silver Print. Web. July 2, 2015.
- Lindroth, Linda. "Artist' Statement." Remembrances of the Holocaust Exhibition Catalog. Rutgers-Camden Center For the Arts, 1999. Print.
- "Trail/Trial of Wilma Mankiller." Midtown Y Gallery. Web. July 2, 2015.
- Minsky, Richard et al. Out of Bounds, Books as Art/Art as Books Catalog. New Haven: Creative Arts Workshop. Print.
- Newman, Thelma R. Innovative Printmaking: The Making of Two- and Three-dimensional Prints and Multiples. New York: Crown, 1977. 136, 147. Print.
- "Photo/Synthesis." Collections -Palmquist @ Womeninphotography.org. Cornell University. Web. July 2, 2015.
- "Real Art Ways A Guide to the Collection at the Hartford History Center." Real Art Ways A Guide to the Collection at the Hartford History Center. Web. July 2, 2015.
- Rosoff, Patricia. "Seeking to Recapture Paradise Lost. Beyond The Picture Plane Exhibition Review." The Hartford Advocate May 9, 1996. Print.
- Rush, Michael. Art New England Exhibition Review. New Haven: Artspace, 1993. Print.
- Unfettered Photographs: Stretching Definitions Carriage Barn Gallery. Art New England, 1994. Print.
- Sant, Toni. Franklin Furnace and the Spirit of the Avant-garde a History of the Future. Bristol, UK: Intellect, 2011. Print.
- Sky, Alison. People in Glass Houses...Exhibition Catalog. Brooklyn: Urban Glass, 1996. 3. Print.
- Stromsten, Amy, and Patricia Ann McDermott et al. Ten Years of Women Artists at Douglass 1971–1981. Rutgers U, 1981. Unpaginated. Print.
- Schwendenwien, Jude. "Wesleyan Exhibit Explores Reading as a Public Art." The Hartford Courant May 20, 1990. Print.
- Szarkowski, John. Exhibition Catalog. The Berkshire Museum. Pittsfield, 1992. Print.
- Temin, Globe Staff. "Renovation and Landscape Show Light up BCA's Mills Gallery." The Boston Globe September 15, 1996. Print.
- Traiger, Lynn. "Linda Lindroth Polaroid 20x24 Studio." Hartford Advocate March 1, 1987. Print.
- Trout, Amy, and Linda Lindroth. "Snapshots from Where I Am Now." The Harbor of the Red Mountains. Contemporary Photographers Look at East Rock and West Rock: Exhibition Catalog. New Haven: New Haven Colony Historical Society. Print.
- Tsien, Billie. 30 Years of Emerging Voices: Idea, Form, Resonance. New York: Princeton Architectural, 2015. Print.
- Weir Farm Visiting Artists Exhibition Catalog. Aldrich Museum of Contemporary Art, 1995. 2–3. Print. Weir Farm Heritage Trust with support from the National Park Service
- Witkin, Lee D., and Barbara London. The Photograph Collector's Guide. Boston: New York Graphic Society, 1979. 304. Print.
- Zimmer, William. "The Aldrich Museum Exhibition Review." The New York Times, November 5, 1995. Print.

== Artwork in museum collections ==
- The Museum of Modern Art, New York City
- The Museum of the City of New York
- International Polaroid Collection
- The New Jersey State Museum, Trenton
- The Bibliothèque Nationale, Paris
- The Metropolitan Museum of Art, New York City
- High Museum of Art, Atlanta
- Franklin Furnace Archive/MoMA
- Musée d'art et d'histoire, Fribourg, Switzerland
- The New Jersey State Museum, Trenton
- The Center for Creative Photography, Tucson, Arizona
- The Newark Museum, Newark, NJ
- The Jane Voorhees Zimmerli Art Museum New Brunswick, NJ
- Yale University
- Princeton University Art Museum
- WestLicht_Schauplatz für Fotografie, Vienna
