= List of LGBTQ-related films of 2024 =

List of 2024 LGBT movies

This is a list of lesbian, gay, bisexual, transgender or queer-related films released in 2024. It contains theatrically released films that deal with important gay, lesbian, bisexual, transgender or queer characters or issues and may have same-sex romance or relationships as a plot device.

== Films ==
| Title | Director | Country | Genre | Cast | Notes | Ref |
|---|---|---|---|---|---|---|
| Across the Sea (La mer au loin) | Saïd Hamich Benlarbi | France, Morocco, Belgium, Qatar | Drama | | | |
| All Shall Be Well | Ray Yeung | Hong Kong | Drama | Patra Au, Maggie Li Lin Lin | Winner of the Teddy Award for best feature film at the Berlinale | |
| Almost Popular | Nayip Ramos | United States | Comedy-coming of age | Ruby Rose Turner, Reid Miller, Isabella Ferreira, Ellodee Carpenter, Elijah M. Cooper, Avi Angel, Arden Myrin, Kathleen Rose Perkins | | |
| And the Breadwinner Is... | Jun Lana | Philippines | Comedy-drama | Vice Ganda | | |
| Any Other Way: The Jackie Shane Story | Michael Mabbott, Lucah Rosenberg-Lee | Canada | Documentary | Jackie Shane | | |
| Are You Scared to Be Yourself Because You Think That You Might Fail? | Bec Pecaut | Canada | Short drama | Lío Mehiel, Sadie Scott, Phyllis Ellis, Francesca Dill | | |
| Arthur Erickson: Beauty Between the Lines | Danny Berish, Ryan Mah | Canada | Documentary | Arthur Erickson | | |
| The Astronaut Lovers (Los amantes astronautas) | Marco Berger | Argentina, Spain | Drama | Javier Orán, Lautaro Bettoni, Mora Arenillas | | |
| Baby | Marcelo Caetano | Brazil, France, Netherlands | Drama | João Pedro Mariano, Ricardo Teodoro, Ana Flavia Cavalcanti, Bruna Linzmeyer, Luiz Bertazzo | | |
| The Balconettes (Les Femmes au balcon) | Noémie Merlant | France | Comedy, horror | Souheila Yacoub, Noémie Merlant, Sanda Codreanu, Lucas Bravo | | |
| Beautiful Evening, Beautiful Day (Lijepa večer, lijep dan) | Ivona Juka | Croatia, Poland, Canada, Cyprus, Bosnia and Herzegovina | Drama | Emir Hadžihafizbegović, Elmir Krivalić, Dado Ćosić, Slaven Došlo, Đorđe Galić, Goran Grgić | | |
| Beautiful Rebel (Sei nell'anima) | Cinzia Torrini | Italy | Drama | Letizia Toni, Selene Caramazza, Stefano Rossi Giordani, Teresa Tanini, Maurizio Lombardi | | |
| The Belle from Gaza (La Belle de Gaza) | Yolande Zauberman | France | Documentary | | | |
| Bird | Andrea Arnold | United Kingdom, France, Germany, United States | Drama | Barry Keoghan, Franz Rogowski | | |
| Block Pass (La Pampa) | Antoine Chevrollier | France | Drama | Sayyid El Alami, Amaury Foucher, Damien Bonnard, Mathieu Demy | | |
| bluish | Lilith Kraxner, Milena Czernovsky | Austria | Drama | | | |
| Bouchra (For Aicha) | Orian Barki, Meriem Bennani | Italy, Morocco, United States | Animated | | | |
| Bulletproof: A Lesbian's Guide to Surviving the Plot | Regan Latimer | Canada | Documentary | | | |
| Cabo Negro | Abdellah Taïa | France, Morocco | Drama | Youness Beyej, Oumaima Barid, Julian Compan | | |
| Call Me Agnes | Daniel Donato | Netherlands | Docufiction | | | |
| Carnage for Christmas | Alice Maio Mackay | Australia | Horror | | | |
| Chabuca | Jorge Carmona | Peru | Drama | Sergio Armasgo, Haydeé Cáceres, Norka Ramirez, Miguel Dávalos, Izan Alcázar | Biographical drama about the childhood of Chola Chabuca | |
| Challengers | Luca Guadagnino | United States | Drama | Zendaya, Josh O'Connor, Mike Faist | | |
| A Cheap Movie (Una película barata) | Osama Chami | Spain | Comedy-drama | | | |
| Cherub | Devin Shears | Canada | Comedy-drama | Benjamin Turnbull | | |
| Cidade; Campo | Juliana Rojas | Brazil, Germany, France | Drama | Fernanda Vianna, Mirella Façanha, Bruna Linzmeyer | | |
| Crossing | Levan Akin | Sweden, Denmark, France, Turkey, Georgia | Drama | Mzia Arabuli, Lucas Kankava, Deniz Dumanlı | Winner of the Teddy Award jury prize at the Berlinale | |
| Daughter's Daughter | Huang Xi | Taiwan | Drama | Sylvia Chang, Karena Lam, Alannah Ong, Winston Chao, Eugenie Liu, Tracy Chou | | |
| Demons at Dawn (Los demonios del amanecer) | Julián Hernández | Mexico | Drama | | | |
| Diciannove | Giovanni Tortorici | Italy | Drama | Manfredi Marini, Vittoria Planeta, Dana Giuliano, Zackari Delmas, Luca Lazzareschi, Sergio Benvenuto | | |
| Disco's Revenge | Omar Majeed, Peter Mishara | Canada | Documentary | Nile Rodgers, Billy Porter, Nona Hendryx, Grandmaster Flash, Fab Five Freddy, Nicky Siano, Earl Young, Jellybean Benitez, Kevin Saunderson, Sylvester, Martha Wash | | |
| Do I Know You from Somewhere? | Arianna Martinez | Canada | Drama | Caroline Bell, Ian Ottis Goff, Mallory Amirault | | |
| Dragfox | Lisa Ott | United Kingdom | Animated short | Aidan Gale, Ian McKellen, Divina de Campo | | |
| Drive-Away Dolls | Ethan Coen | United States | Comedy | Margaret Qualley, Geraldine Viswanathan, Beanie Feldstein, Colman Domingo, Pedro Pascal, Bill Camp, Matt Damon, Joey Slotnick | | |
| Drive Back Home | Michael Clowater | Canada | Drama | Charlie Creed-Miles, Alan Cumming, Clare Coulter, Sprague Grayden | | |
| Duino | Juan Pablo Di Pace, Andrés P. Estrada | United States, Argentina, Italy | Drama | Juan Pablo Di Pace, Santiago Madrussan, Oscar Morgan, August Wittgenstein, Araceli González | | |
| Eat the Night | Caroline Poggi, Jonathan Vinel | France | Thriller | Lila Gueneau, Théo Cholbi, Erwan Kepoa Falé | | |
| Emilia Pérez | Jacques Audiard | France | Musical comedy | Karla Sofía Gascón, Selena Gomez, Zoe Saldaña, Édgar Ramírez, Mark Ivanir, Adriana Paz | | |
| Extremely Unique Dynamic | Harrison Xu, Ivan Leung, Katherine Dudas | United States | Comedy | Harrison Xu, Ivan Leung, Hudson Yang | | |
| Fallen Fruit | Chris Molina | United States | Comedy-drama | Ramiro Batista | | |
| Feeling Randy | Dean Lent | United States | Comedy | Reid Miller, Kerrice Brooks, Tyler Lawrence Gray, Jonathan Silverman, Marguerite Moreau, Blaine Kern III, Shane Almagor, Oliver Wyman, Chris Mulkey, Richard Riehle, Courtney Danforth | premiere at November 1, 2024 | |
| Fotogenico | Marcia Romano, Benoît Sabatier | France | Drama | Christophe Paou, Roxane Mesquida | | |
| Gender Reveal | Mo Matton | Canada | Short comedy | Ayo Tsalithaba, Kě Xīn Li, Lyraël (Alex) Dauphin | | |
| Good One | India Donaldson | United States | Drama | Lily Collias, James Le Gros, Danny McCarthy | | |
| The Good Teacher | Teddy Lussi-Modeste | France, Belgium | Drama | François Civil, Shaïn Boumedine, Bakary Kebe, Toscane Duquesne, Marianne Ehouman, Mallory Wanecque, Agnès Hurstel | | |
| Grandmamauntsistercat | Zuza Banasińska | Netherlands, Poland | Short documentary | | Winner of the Teddy Award for best short film at the Berlinale | |
| Griffin in Summer | Nicholas Colia | United States | Comedy | Everett Blunck, Melanie Lynskey, Owen Teague, Abby Ryder Fortson, Michael Esper, Kathryn Newton | | |
| Haze | Matthew Fifer | United States | Drama | Cole Doman, Brian J. Smith | | |
| Hello Stranger | Amélie Hardy | Canada | Short documentary | Cooper Josephine | | |
| High Tide | Marco Calvani | United States | Drama | Marco Pigossi, James Bland, Marisa Tomei, Bill Irwin, Mya Taylor, Sean Mahon, Bryan Batt | | |
| A House Is Not a Disco | Brian J. Smith | United States | Documentary | | | |
| I Don't Understand You | David Joseph Craig, Brian William Crano | United States | Comedy | Nick Kroll, Andrew Rannells | | |
| I Never Promised You a Jasmine Garden | Teyama Alkamli | Canada | Short drama | Tara Hakim, Sandy El-Bitar | | |
| I Saw the TV Glow | Jane Schoenbrun | United States | Horror | Justice Smith, Brigette Lundy-Paine, Helena Howard, Lindsey Jordan, Danielle Deadwyler, Fred Durst | | |
| I'm Not Everything I Want to Be (Jeste nejsem, kým chci být) | Klára Tasovská | Czech Republic, Slovakia, Austria | Documentary | | | |
| Immaculata | Kim Lêa Sakkal | France, Germany | Short drama | Jan Bluthardt, Devrim Lingnau, Deleila Piasko, Simon Steinhorst | | |
| In the Summers | Alessandra Lacorazza Samudio | United States | Drama | René Pérez, Sasha Calle, Lío Mehiel, Emma Ramos, Leslie Grace | | |
| Inkwo for When the Starving Return | Amanda Strong | Canada | Animated short | Paulina Alexis, Tantoo Cardinal, Art Napoleon | | |
| Julian and the Wind | Connor Jessup | Canada | Short drama | David Webster, Joel Oulette, James Gerald Hicks | | |
| Kill the Jockey (El Jockey) | Luis Ortega | Argentina, Mexico, Spain, Denmark, United States | Comedy thriller | Nahuel Pérez Biscayart, Úrsula Corberó, Daniel Giménez Cacho, Mariana di Girolamo | | |
| Kyuka: Before Summer's End | Kostis Charamountanis | Greece, North Macedonia | Drama | | | |
| Lakeview | Tara Thorne | Canada | Comedy | Lesley Smith, Hilary Adams, Nicole Steeves | | |
| Langue étrangère | Claire Burger | France, Germany, Belgium | Comedy-drama | Lilith Grasmug, Josefa Heinsius, Nina Hoss, Chiara Mastroianni, Jalal Altawil | | |
| Larry (They/Them) (Larry (iel)) | Catherine Legault | Canada | Documentary | Laurence Philomène | | |
| The Last Taboo | Manfred Oldenburg | Germany, United Kingdom, United States, Czechia | Documentary | | | |
| Layla | Amrou Al-Kadhi | United Kingdom | Romantic comedy-drama | Bilal Hasna, Louis Greatorex, Safiyya Ingar, Terique Jarrett | | |
| The Legacy of Cloudy Falls | Nick Butler | Canada | Comedy-drama | Grace Glowicki, Andrew Moodie, Susan Berger, Amanda Martinez | | |
| The Life of Sean DeLear | Markus Zizenbacher | Austria | Documentary | Sean DeLear | | |
| Little Hearts | Aby Treesa Paul, Anto Jose Pereira | India | Romantic comedy | Shane Nigam, Mahima Nambiar, Baburaj, Shine Tom Chacko, Jaffar Idukki, Aima Rosmy Sebastian | | |
| Look at Me | Taylor Olson | Canada | Comedy-drama | Taylor Olson, Koumbie | | |
| Love (Kjærlighet) | Dag Johan Haugerud | Norway | Drama | Andrea Bræin Hovig, Tayo Cittadella Jacobsen | | |
| Love Lies Bleeding | Rose Glass | United States | Thriller | Kristen Stewart, Dave Franco, Ed Harris, Jena Malone, Anna Baryshnikov, Katy O'Brian | | |
| Luther: Never Too Much | Dawn Porter | United States | Documentary | Luther Vandross | | |
| Marcello Mio | Christophe Honoré | France, Italy | Comedy | Chiara Mastroianni, Catherine Deneuve, Fabrice Luchini, Nicole Garcia, Benjamin Biolay, Melvil Poupaud, Hugh Skinner, Stefania Sandrelli | | |
| Mean Girls | Samantha Jayne, Arturo Perez Jr. | United States | Musical comedy | Angourie Rice, Reneé Rapp, Auliʻi Cravalho, Jaquel Spivey, Avantika Vandanapu, Bebe Wood, Christopher Briney, Jenna Fischer, Busy Philipps, Tina Fey, Tim Meadows | | |
| Mika ex machina | Deborah Saïag, Mika Tard | France | Comedy | | | |
| Miller's Girl | Jade Halley Bartlett | United States | Thriller | Martin Freeman, Jenna Ortega, Bashir Salahuddin, Gideon Adlon, Dagmara Domińczyk, Christine Adams | | |
| Misericordia | Alain Guiraudie | France, Spain, Portugal | Thriller | Félix Kysyl, Catherine Frot, Jacques Develay, Jean-Baptiste Durand, David Ayala, Tatiana Spivakova | | |
| Monkey Man | Dev Patel | Canada, United States | Action thriller | Dev Patel, Pitobash, Sikandar Kher, Sobhita Dhulipala, Makarand Deshpande, Ashwini Kalsekar, Vipin Sharma, Sharlto Copley | | |
| Most People Die on Sundays (Los domingos mueren más personas) | Iair Said | Argentina, Italy, Spain | Comedy-drama | Iair Said, Rita Cortese, Antonia Zegers, Juliana Gattas | | |
| Motel Destino | Karim Aïnouz | Brazil, France, Germany | Thriller | Iago Xavier, Nataly Rocha, Fábio Assunção | | |
| A Mother Apart | Laurie Townshend | Canada | Documentary | Staceyann Chin | | |
| Mother Father Sister Brother Frank | Caden Douglas | Canada | Black comedy, thriller | Mindy Cohn, Enrico Colantoni, Melanie Leishman, Chad Connell, Sharron Matthews, Juan Chioran | | |
| My Old Ass | Megan Park | United States | Comedy | Maisy Stella, Aubrey Plaza, Maddie Ziegler, Percy Hynes White, Seth Isaac Johnson | | |
| My Place Is Here (Il mio posto è qui) | Cristiano Bortone | Italy | Drama | Ludovica Martino, Marco Leonardi | | |
| My Senses Are All I Have to Offer (As minhas sensações são tudo o que tenho para oferecer) | Isadora Neves Marques | Portugal | Short drama | Ágata Pinho, Isadora Alves, Mário Afonso, Albano Jerónimo | | |
| My Sunshine (Boku No Ohisama) | Hiroshi Okuyama | France, Japan | Keitatsu Koshiyama, Kiara Takanashi, Sosuke Ikematsu, Ryuya Wakaba | | | |
| nanekawâsis | Conor McNally | Canada | Documentary | George Littlechild | | |
| A Nice Indian Boy | Roshan Sethi | United States | Romantic comedy | Karan Soni, Jonathan Groff, Sunita Mani, Zarna Garg, Harish Patel | | |
| Om Bheem Bush | Sree Harsha Konuganti | India | Comedy horror | Sree Vishnu, Priyadarshi Pulikonda, Rahul Ramakrishna, Preity Mukhundhan | | |
| On Swift Horses | Daniel Minahan | United States | Drama | Daisy Edgar-Jones, Jacob Elordi, Will Poulter, Diego Calva, Sasha Calle | | |
| One Day This Kid | Alexander Farah | Canada | Short drama | Elyas Rahimi, Mahan Mohammadinasab, Massey Ahmar, Shadi Janho | | |
| Oneness | Priyakanta Laishram | India | Crime drama | Priyakanta Laishram, Maya Choudhury | | |
| Out | Dennis Alink | Netherlands | Drama | | | |
| Peaches Goes Bananas | Marie Losier | France, Belgium | Documentary | Peaches | | |
| Perfect Endings (13 Sentimentos) | Daniel Ribeiro | Brazil | Romantic comedy | Artur Volpi, Michel Joelsas | | |
| Ponyboi | Esteban Arango | United States | Thriller | River Gallo, Dylan O'Brien, Victoria Pedretti, Murray Bartlett, Indya Moore | | |
| Pooja, Sir | Deepak Rauniyar | Nepal, Norway, United States | Crime drama | Asha Magrati, Nikita Chandak, Dayahang Rai, Reecha Sharma, Bijay Baral | | |
| Queens of Drama (Les Reines de la drame) | Alexis Langlois | France, Belgium | Musical drama | | | |
| Queer | Luca Guadagnino | Italy, United States | Drama | Daniel Craig, Drew Starkey, Lesley Manville, Jason Schwartzman | | |
| Really Happy Someday | J Stevens | Canada | Drama | Breton Lalama | | |
| Reas | Lola Arias | Argentina, Germany, Switzerland | Documentary | | | |
| Rent Free | Fernando Andrés | United States | Comedy-drama | Jacob Roberts, David Treviño, Molly Edelman, Neal Mulani, Sarah J. Bartholomew, Zeke Goodman | | |
| Sabbath Queen | Sandi Simcha Dubowski | United States | Documentary | Amichai Lau-Lavie | | |
| Sad Jokes | Fabian Stumm | Germany | Comedy-drama | Fabian Stumm, Haley Louise Jones, Ulrica Flach, Jonas Dassler | | |
| Sally! | Deborah Craig | United States | Documentary | Sally Miller Gearhart | | |
| Sauna Day (Sannapäiv) | Anna Hints, Tushar Prakash | Estonia | Short documentary | | | |
| Sebastian | Mikko Mäkelä | United Kingdom | Drama | Ruaridh Mollica, Hiftu Quasem, Ingvar Sigurdsson, Jonathan Hyde | | |
| Sex | Dag Johan Haugerud | Norway | Drama | Jan Gunnar Røise, Thorbjørn Harr | | |
| The Shameless | Konstantin Bojanov | India, Bulgaria, France, Switzerland, Taiwan | Drama | Anasuya Sengupta, Omara Shetty | | |
| The Shrouds | David Cronenberg | Canada, France | Horror | Vincent Cassel, Diane Kruger, Guy Pearce, Sandrine Holt, Elizabeth Saunders, Jennifer Dale | | |
| Sisters | Susie Yankou | United States | Comedy | Susie Yankou, Sarah Khasrovi, Kausar Mohammed | | |
| Slay | Jem Garrard | Canada | Comedy, horror | Trinity the Tuck, Heidi N Closet, Crystal Methyd, Cara Melle | | |
| Some Nights I Feel Like Walking | Petersen Vargas | Philippines | Drama | | | |
| Soul of the Desert (Alma del desierto) | Mónica Taboada-Tapia | Colombia, Brazil | Documentary | Georgina Epiayu | | |
| Southern Brides (Las novias del sur) | Elena Lopez Riera | Switzerland, Spain | Short documentary | | Winner of the Queer Palm short film award at Cannes | |
| Stress Positions | Theda Hammel | United States | Comedy-drama | John Early, Qaher Harhash, Elizabeth Dement, Theda Hammel | | |
| Strictly Confidential | Damian Hurley | United States | Thriller | Elizabeth Hurley, Georgia Lock, Lauren McQueen, Freddie Thorp, Genevieve Gaunt | | |
| Sweet Angel Baby | Melanie Oates | Canada | Drama | Michaela Kurimsky, Elle-Máijá Tailfeathers, Peter Mooney | | |
| Teaches of Peaches | Philipp Fussenegger, Judy Landkammer | Germany | Documentary | Peaches | Winner of the Teddy Award for best documentary film at the Berlinale | |
| Three | Amie Song | United States | Short drama | Eleven Lee, Sam Xu, Maritza Cayo, Rika Yu, Audrey Wang, Tommy Z, Weitong Chen | | |
| Three Kilometres to the End of the World | Emanuel Pârvu | Romania | Drama | Ciprian Chiujdea, Laura Vasiliu, Bogdan Dumitrache, Ingrid Micu-Berescu, Valeriu Andriuță, Adrian Titieni | Winner of the Queer Palm at Cannes | |
| Throuple | Greyson Horst | United States | Comedy | Jess Gabor, Stanton Plummer-Cambridge, Bethlehem Million, Max Larsen, Taylor Turner, Charlie Reid | | |
| To Live, To Die, To Live Again (Vivre, Mourir, Renaître) | Gaël Morel | France | Drama | Victor Belmondo, Lou Lampros, Théo Christine | | |
| To the Moon | Kevin Hartford | Canada | Comedy | Jacob Sampson, Phoebe Rex, Amy Groening | | |
| Transmitzvah | Daniel Burman | Argentina | Musical, comedy | Penélope Guerrero, Gustavo Bassani, Juan Minujin, Alejandro Awada, Alejandra Flechner, Carla Quevedo | | |
| Underground Orange | Michael Taylor Jackson | Argentina, United States | Comedy-drama | | | |
| Unusually Normal | Colette Johnson-Vosberg | Canada | Documentary | | | |
| The Visitor | Bruce LaBruce | United Kingdom | Comedy | Bishop Black | | |
| Viet and Nam | Truong Minh Quý | Vietnam, Philippines, Singapore, France, Netherlands | Romantic drama | | | |
| The War on Children | Robby Starbuck | United States | Documentary | | Anti-LGBTQ propaganda film | |
| We Forgot to Break Up | Karen Knox | Canada | Drama | Lane Webber, Daniel Gravelle, June Laporte, Jordan Dawson, Hallea Jones | | |
| We Were Dangerous | Josephine Stewart | New Zealand, United States | Drama | Rima Te Wiata, Erana James | | |
| Went Up the Hill | Samuel Van Grinsven | Australia | Thriller | Dacre Montgomery, Vicky Krieps | | |
| Will & Harper | Josh Greenbaum | United States | Documentary | Will Ferrell, Harper Steele | | |
| Young Hearts | Anthony Schatteman | Belgium, Netherlands | Drama | Lou Goossens and Marius De Saeger | | |

== See also ==
- List of LGBT-related films of 2025
