= Alone with You =

Alone with You may refer to:

== Music ==
- Alone with You (album), an album by Loretta Lynn
- "Alone with You" (Brenda Lee song)
- "Alone with You" (Tevin Campbell song)
- "Alone with You" (Texas song)
- "Alone with You" (Jake Owen song)
- Alone with You (Faron Young song)
- "Alone with You" (Sunnyboys song)
- "Alone with You", a song from deadmau5's album Random Album Title
- "Alone with You", a song by Arz (rapper)

== Other uses ==
- Alone with You (film), a 2021 horror film
- "Alone With You", a 2016 romantic-adventure video game developed by Benjamin Rivers, released on the PlayStation 4 and PlayStation Vita
