= Little Bites =

2024 film directed by Spider One

- Directed by: Spider One
- Written by: Spider One
- Produced by: Spider One; Krsy Fox
- Starring: Krsy Fox; Jon Sklaroff; Barbara Crampton; Elizabeth Phoenix Caro
- Cinematography: Andy Patch
- Edited by: Krsy Fox
- Music by: Roy Mayorga
- Distributed by: RLJE Films; Shudder
- Release date: October 4, 2024
- Running time: 106 minutes
- Country: United States
- Language: English
- Box office: $9,299

Little Bites is a 2024 horror film directed by Spider One. It premiered on Fantastic Fest 2024. It was released by RLJE Films in theaters on October 4, 2024, followed by a streaming release on Shudder. Starring Krsy Fox and executively produced by Cher, the film received mostly positive reviews from critics.

== Premise ==
Trying to get rid of a demon that torments her daughter Alice, Mindy Vogel decides to send her to live with her grandmother.

== Cast ==
- Krsy Fox as Mindy Vogel
- Jon Sklaroff as Agyar
- Elizabeth Phoenix Caro as Alice Vogel
- Barbara Crampton as Sonya Whitfield
- Heather Langenkamp as Ellenor
- Bonnie Aarons as grandmother
- Chaz Bono as Paul
- Lyndsi LaRose as Gail

== Reception ==
=== Box office ===
In the United States and Canada, the film made $8,057 from 18 theaters in its opening weekend.

=== Critical response ===
On the review aggregator website Rotten Tomatoes, 81% of 16 critics' reviews are positive.

Catherine Bray of The Guardian rated it 3/5 stars writing that "what could have been a real contender with a few relatively minor tweaks is still a serviceable morsel for those with the right kind of appetite." On RogerEbert.com, Brian Tallerico rated it 1.5 out of 4 stars calling it "frustrating".

In his review for The Mercury News, Randy Meyers rated it 1.5 out of 4 stars writing that "there is an attempt to comment on the sacrifices that moms make, but it gets squelched by its own unevenness." On Film Threat, Michael Talbot-Haynes scored the film a 10/10 writing in his review consensus section: "the most potent hybrid of drama and horror since George A. Romero's Martin".

On Bloody Disgusting, Trace Thurman rated it 2.5/5 "skulls" writing that "Little Bites shows signs of promise from the burgeoning filmmaker, but an obvious script and sluggish pacing keep it from becoming something truly special."

== See also ==
- List of horror films of 2024
