= Trans Memoria =

- Directed by: Victoria Versaau
- Starring: Victoria Versaau; Athena Love; Aamina Larsson
- Release date: 2024
- Running time: 72 minutes
- Countries: Sweden; France
- Languages: English; Swedish

Trans Memoria is a 2024 Swedish documentary film directed by Victoria Versaau. The film premiered at the 58th Karlovy Vary International Film Festival.

== Plot ==
Director Victoria reflects on her gender transition and experiences as a woman. After the death of her close friend and fellow trans woman, Meril, she shares her story with Athena and Aamina, who are undergoing their own transitions.

The film is composed of not only documentary footage but also "reconstructed memories" and video diaries recorded by Versaau in 2012.

== Cast ==
- Victoria Versaau as herself
- Athena Love as herself
- Aamina Larsson as herself

== Recognition ==
=== Reception ===
The International Cinephile Society praised the film, awarding it 4/5 stars and writing it was “a deeply personal document that sets out to offer a more thorough view of the trans experience, without ever promoting itself as definitive in any way.” Purple Hour notes Versaau's inclusion of "extraordinarily intense self-archival footage of herself" which Eye For Film also notes as "clear-eyed and poetic in equal measure".

=== Awards and nominations ===
- 2025, won Kasseler Dokfest's Golden Key award in the Feature Film category.

== See also ==
- List of LGBTQ-related films of 2024
