= The Bell Keeper =

2023 film directed by Colton Tran

- Release poster
- Directed by: Colton Tran
- Written by: Joe Davison
- Produced by: Artisha Mann-Cooper; Jonathan Copper; Nick Theurer; Chad Oliver; Phillip B. Goldfine; Kevin Weisberg; Lou Paik; Kurt Van Fossen
- Starring: Randy Couture; Kathleen Kenny; Reid Miller; Cathy Marks; Mike Manning; Daniel Dasent; Bonnie Aarons; Chaz Bono
- Cinematography: Zach Salsman
- Edited by: Colton Tran
- Music by: Alexander Taylor; Steve Yeaman (additional)
- Production companies: Bungalow Media; Artman Cooper Production; Tino Films Entertainment
- Distributed by: Screen Media
- Release date: October 13, 2023
- Running time: 92 minutes
- Country: United States
- Language: English

The Bell Keeper is a 2023 American action horror film directed and edited by Colton Tran, and written by Joe Davison.

It was released in the United States by Screen Media Films on October 13, 2023.

== Plot ==
A team of documentary filmmakers and friends go on a camping trip to try and debunk the myth about a killer who is summoned after the ringing of a bell.

== Cast ==
- Nick Theurer as Gary
- Bailey Castle as Nadine
- Randy Couture as Hank
- Kathleen Kenny as Brittany
- Reid Miller as Liam
- Mike Manning as Matthew
- Cathy Marks as Holly
- Capri-Antoine Vaillancourt as Gabriel
- Alexis B. Santiago as Megan
- Michael Cervantes as gas guy
- Chaz Bono as Ranger Carlson
- Bonnie Aarons as Jodie
- Daniel Dasent as Jackson human / Demon
- Kali Marsh as Elsey

== Production ==
In March 2022, Chaz Bono and Bonnie Aarons signed on to star in The Bell Keeper, alongside Randy Couture, Reid Miller, Mike Manning, Kathleen Kenny and Cathy Marks. Directed by Colton Tran and written by Joe Davison, the film was executive produced by Jeffrey Reddick. Principal photography took place in Santa Clarita, California in February 2022.

== Release ==
The Bell Keeper was released on digital platforms by Screen Media on October 13, 2023. It was released on DVD on December 5, 2023.

== Reception ==
Daniel Rester of Film Threat gave it a 6/10 rating saying, "just when I was beginning to wonder if The Bell Keeper had anything new to add, the script by Joe Davison and Luke Genton throws the audience a curveball during the midpoint ... offers an enjoyable horror ride for undemanding genre fans."
