= Sacrifice (2020 film) =

British lovecraftian horror film

- Directed by: Andy Collier; Tor Mian
- Screenplay by: Andy Collier; Tor Mian
- Produced by: Sean Knoop; Tor Mian; Ross Scaife
- Starring: Barbara Crampton; Sophie Stevens; Ludovic Hughes; Lukas Loughran
- Release date: October 22, 2020 (Frightfest)
- Running time: 87 minutes
- Country: United Kingdom
- Language: English

Sacrifice is a 2020 horror film. Based on the short story "Men of the Cloth" by Paul Kane, the film is a Lovecraftian horror.

== Plot ==
A woman washes blood stains and leaves her house with her son.

After many years, the son returns from America as an young man to the same house on a Norwegian Island with his pregnant wife. During a bar fight, the young man is revealed to be Isaac Jorstad, son of Johan Jorstad.

Local sheriff, Renate visits Isaac and reveals that 25 years ago Johan was murdered by Isaac's mother. Isaac reveals that his mother is dead and Isaac inherited the house through a will. While having dinner at Renate's house, Isaac and his wife meet Astrid, Renate's daughter and discuss about local customs and the local myth called The Slumbering One.

Isaac's wife starts to get weird dreams and Isaac joins a local water based cult ceremony / ritual by reciting a pledge to The Slumbering One. After an argument with his wife, Isaac has a brief conversation with Astrid who was swimming in the sea naked.

After a conversation with a Realtor, Isaac wants to stay in the house but Isaac's wife wants to sell the house and go back to America. Isaac drinks at the bar and has a brief conversation with Gunnar. Isaac's wife continues to get nightmares. Gunnar gives tools and equipments to Isaac who wishes to build a Tupilaq for Johan. Gunnar predicates that Isaac's unborn child is a boy. After an argument with Isaac, Isaac's wife knocks Isaac unconscious to escape the island.

The ferryman refuses to take Isaac's wife to the mainland and also reveals that he helped Isaac's mother 25 years ago. Isaac's wife, Emma goes to Renate's house for help but Emma is surprised to find Isaac at Renate's house. Emma falls unconscious after unknowingly drinking water that Renate drugged.

Emma wakes up tied to an altar surrounded by cultists. Isaac raises a sword to stab Emma but Renate and the other cultists take Isaac captive. Renate reveals Isaac was meant to be sacrificed 25 years ago. As Emma watches in horror, Renate cuts Isaac's head off with a sword. The sword is thrown into the sea, Astrid places Isaac's head inside a Tupilaq and Isaac's body is set on fire. The Slumbering One accepts the sacrifice by returning the sword to the cultists.

== Cast ==
- Sophie Stevens as Emma Pickman
- Ludovic Hughes as Isaac Pickman
- Barbara Crampton as Renate Nygard
- Lukas Loughran as Gunnar
- Johanna Adde Dahl as Astrid Nygard
- Jack Kristiansen as Ledvor
- Erik Lundin as Hallstein
- Dag Soerlie as Matias
- Ingeborg Mork Håskjold as Mrs. Jorstad
- Edwin Roseth-Øye as Young Isaac Pickman
- Annika Josefine Stromblad as Shopkeeper
- Balder Bjørke as Child

== Release ==
The film premiered at the 2020 London FrightFest Film Festival. It was later released as video on demand on 9 February 2021 and on Blu-ray on 23 February 2021.

== Reception ==
The review aggregator website Rotten Tomatoes surveyed 16 critics and, categorizing the reviews as positive or negative, assessed 10 as positive and five as negative for a 63% rating. Among the reviews, it determined an average rating of 6.1/10. The Guardian gave the film 3/5 stars and said it had "a 1970s giallo vibe."
