= Bonnie Aarons =

American actress

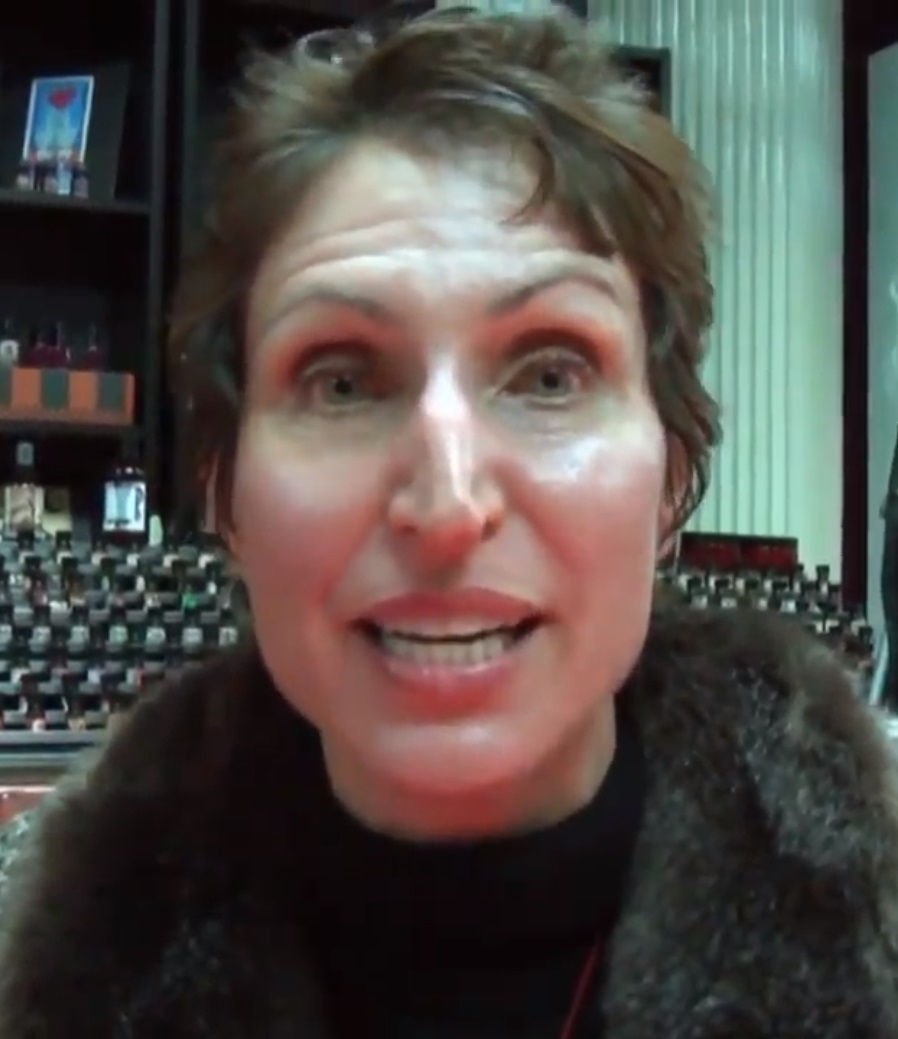
- Aarons in 2011
- Born: September 9, 1960 (age 66); Maryland, U.S
- Occupation: Actress
- Years active: 1994–present

Bonnie Aarons (born September 9, 1960) is an American actress. She is best known for her roles as the Nun, a personification of the demon Valak, in The Conjuring Universe (2016–present), starring in The Conjuring 2 (2016), The Nun (2018) and The Nun II (2023). Other roles include The Bum in Mulholland Drive (2001), Baroness Joy von Troken in The Princess Diaries (2001) and its sequel, The Princess Diaries 2: Royal Engagement (2004).

== Career ==
Aarons attended acting school in New York City and found work in Europe, where she acted in short films and commercials. Her first American film was 1994's Exit to Eden, portraying a prostitute. She then appeared in the Roger Corman-produced "woman in prison" film, Caged Heat 3000. Aarons already had notable roles in other horror movies, such as I Know Who Killed Me, and Drag Me to Hell. She also had a short but memorable role in David Lynch's Mulholland Drive as a monstrous bum behind a dumpster, a role she reprised 24 years later on the Netflix talk show Everybody's Live with John Mulaney. Since 2016, Aarons has starred in the Conjuring Universe making her first appearance in the franchise's second main film The Conjuring 2, portraying a shapeshifting demon by the name of Valak that takes the form of a nun. Aarons was only added during reshoots of the film, but her character was received well with fans and a spin-off was announced shortly after the film's release. Production of The Nun began in May 2017 and the film was released on September 7, 2018. A sequel, The Nun II, was announced in April 2019 and was released on September 8, 2023. In August 2023, Aarons sued Warner Bros., New Line, and Scope productions, the distribution and production companies behind the films in which she starred as the Nun, for breach of contract relating to a lack of pay over merchandising sales.

She appeared in the 2018 film Adi Shankar's Gods and Secrets. In 2022, it was announced that Aarons will be starring in the horror film Camp Pleasant Lake with Michael Paré and Jonathan Lipnicki.

== Filmography ==
=== Film ===
Year	Title	Role	Notes
1995	Caged Heat 3000	Mac	
1996	Dear God	Prophet Woman	
1998	Sweet Jane	Waitress	
2001	Mulholland Drive	The Bum	
2001	The Princess Diaries	Baroness Joy von Troken	
2001	Shallow Hal	Spastic Friend #1	
2003	Specter's Rock	Verna Frenz	
2004	The Princess Diaries 2: Royal Engagement	Baroness Joy von Troken	
2006	Wristcutters: A Love Story	Messiah Worshipper	
2007	I Know Who Killed Me	Fat Teena	
2007	InAlienable	Blue Skinned Woman	
2008	Hell Ride	Mud Devils Ref	
2008	One, Two, Many	Lastima in the Bathroom	
2009	Drag Me to Hell	Mother and Daughter at Decathlon Fest	
2010	Valentine's Day	Strange Lady	
2010	Dahmer vs. Gacy	General Abogados	
2010	The Fighter	Crackeado Bonnie	
2012	Silver Linings Playbook	Rocky D'Angelo's Mother	
2015	Accidental Love	Reporter #2	
2016	The Conjuring 2	Valak / Demon Nun	
2017	Annabelle: Creation	Valak / Demon Nun	Cameo
2018	The Nun	Valak / Demon Nun	
2018	Adi Shankar's Gods and Secrets	Actress	
2021	Jakob's Wife	The Master	
2021	Frank	Mistress Eden	
2023	The Nun II	Valak / Demon Nun	
2023	The Bell Keeper	Jodie	
2024	Camp Pleasant Lake	Esmeralda	
2024	Little Bites	Grandmother	
2025	The Conjuring: Last Rites		Uncredited cameo appearance
2025	Martinez, Margaritas and Murder!	Freddy's Agent	
TBA	Wizardream †	The Crone	Post-production
TBA	Night of the Witch †	Marioara / The Witch	

=== Television ===
Year	Title	Role	Notes
2019	The Boulet Brothers' Dragula	Herself	Guest Judge (Season 3 Episode 2)
2021	The Boulet Brothers' Dragula	Herself	Guest Judge (Season 4 Episode 6)
2022	The Boulet Brothers' Dragula: Titans	Herself	Guest Judge (Season 1 Episode 2)
2025	The Boulet Brothers' Dragula: Titans	Herself	Guest Judge (Season 2 Episode 4)
2025	Everybody's Live with John Mulaney	Dumpster Thing	(episode 6)
