= Allegoria =

- Official release poster
- Directed by: Spider One
- Written by: Spider One
- Produced by: Steve Barton
- Starring: Krsy Fox; John Ennis; Bryce Johnson; Edward Hong; Adam Busch; Adam Marcinowski
- Production company: OneFox Productions
- Distributed by: Shudder; RLJE Films
- Release date: 2 August 2022 (Shudder)
- Running time: 70 minutes
- Country: United States
- Language: English

Allegoria is a 2022 American horror anthology film directed by Spider One, starring John Ennis, Bryce Johnson, Edward Hong, Adam Busch and Adam Marcinowski. It is the directorial debut of Spider One.

== Plot ==
Brody (Krsy Fox), attending an intense acting workshop led by the domineering instructor Robert Anderson Wright (John Ennis). Robert pushes his students to extreme emotional depths, urging them to channel their inner darkness. Under this pressure, Brody taps into something beyond mere emotion, seemingly summoning a real demon. The session turns violent as Brody's transformation leads to a brutal attack, leaving her classmates and instructor in shock and horror.

Marcus (Bryce Johnson) is a painter struggling with creative block and self-doubt. Desperate for inspiration, he encounters a ghastly figure resembling a decayed version of himself. This apparition slashes Marcus's throat in a surreal sequence, symbolizing the self-destructive nature of his artistic obsession. The scene is marked by intense gore, with blood spraying as the doppelgänger completes a painting depicting Marcus's own decapitation.

Eddie Park (Edward Hong) is a screenwriter crafting a slasher film featuring a killer known as The Whistler. After writing a scene where the killer is defeated, Eddie is confronted by The Whistler himself, who emerges from the script into reality. Displeased with the ending, The Whistler attacks Eddie, criticizing his writing and threatening his life. The encounter blurs the lines between fiction and reality, culminating in a violent confrontation that leaves Eddie traumatized.

John (Adam Busch) invites sculptor Ivy (Scout Taylor-Compton) over for a date. As the evening progresses, Ivy reveals her obsession with capturing true emotion in her art. She drugs John and uses his unconscious body as a mold for her next sculpture. Upon awakening, John finds himself restrained, witnessing Ivy's descent into madness as she mutilates him to create her masterpiece. The scene is intensely graphic, showcasing Ivy's transformation into a deranged artist consumed by her work.

Hope, Brody's roommate, is a rock singer experimenting with occult practices. Her band discovers a sequence of musical notes that, when played, summon a demonic entity. During a rehearsal, the band plays the forbidden melody, inadvertently opening a portal to a malevolent force. The entity possesses the band members, leading to a chaotic and bloody massacre as they turn on each other under its influence. The segment ends with Hope being the sole survivor, left to confront the consequences of their actions.

Tying the stories together, revealing that the characters' artistic pursuits and personal demons are interconnected. Brody's initial possession is linked to the band's summoning of the demon, suggesting a cyclical nature of artistic obsession leading to destruction. The final scene features a haunting monologue that encapsulates the film's themes of creativity, madness, and the blurred lines between art and reality.

== Cast ==
- Krsy Fox as Brody
- John Ennis as Robert Anderson Wright
- Bryce Johnson as Marcus
- Edward Hong as Eddie Park
- Adam Busch as John
- Adam Marcinowski as The Whistler
- Scout Taylor-Compton

== Release ==
The film premiered at Panic Fest in May 2022. The film became available to watch on Shudder and received a Video on demand release by RLJE Films.

== Reception ==
Drew Tinnin of Dread Central rated the film 3.5 stars out of 5, calling it "a creepy collection of cautionary tales with a heavy metal edge that’s sure to get under your skin."

Matt Donato of Paste rated the film 5 out of 10, calling it a "damning, dialogue-heavy, seedy but ultimately unfocused anthology that will speak loudest to creatively suffering audiences." The film received a rating of 2.5 out of 5 in Horror Society. Ian Sedensky of Culture Crypt gave the film a score of 30, writing, "the only entertaining moment in “Allegoria” comes from imagining Uncork’d and Wild Eye reps seeing the Shudder and RLJE Films company cards and asking, “Wait, this wasn’t released by one of us?”"
