= Krsy Fox =

Canadian actress

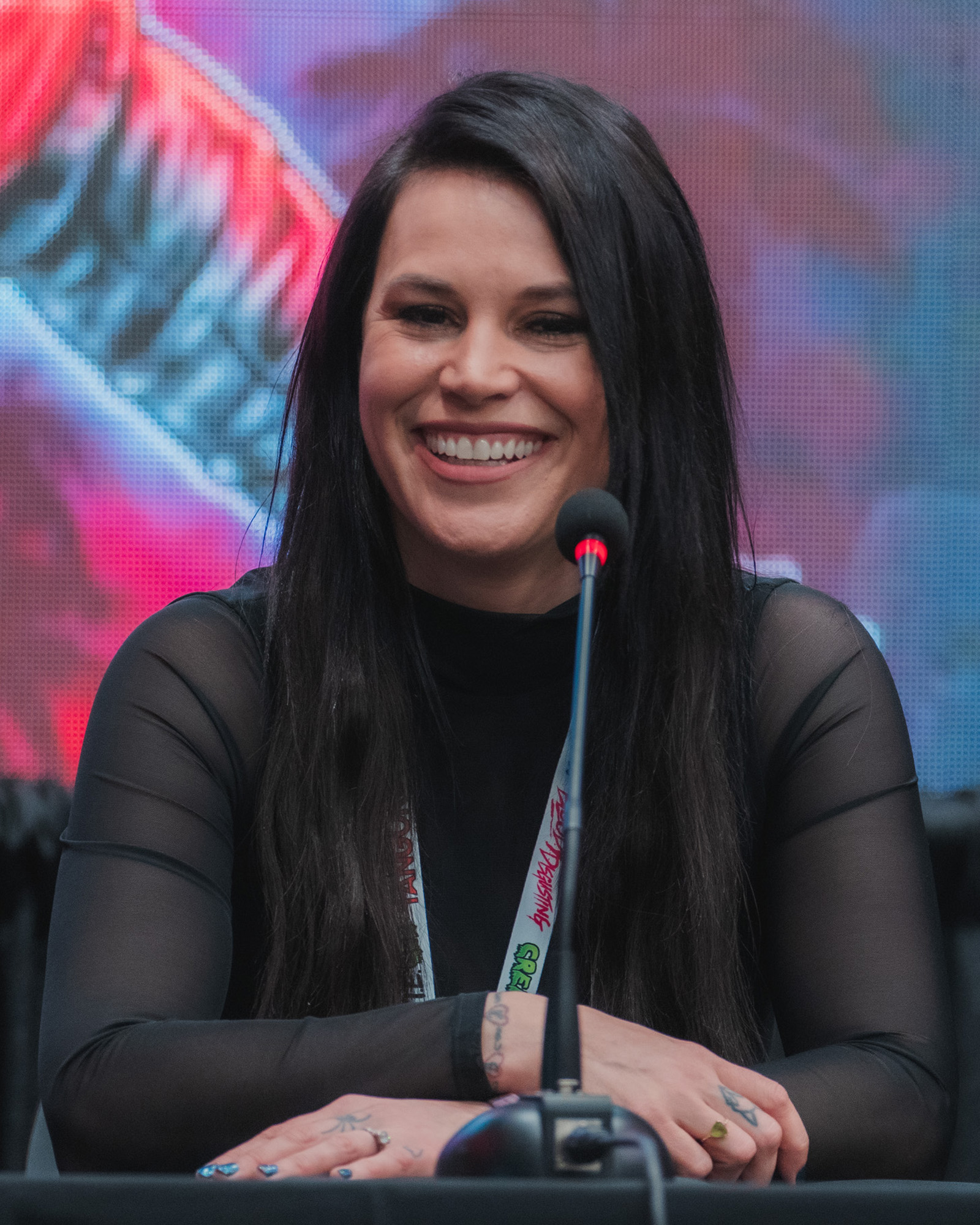
- Fox in 2025
- Born: Christine Danielle; Campbell River, British Columbia, Canada
- Other name: Christine Connolly
- Occupations: Actress; producer; musician
- Years active: 2002–present
- Spouse: Spider One
- Children: 1

Krsy Fox (born Christine Danielle) is a Canadian actress and filmmaker. She has appeared as the lead in three feature films directed by her spouse, Spider One: Allegoria, Bury the Bride and Little Bites.

== Personal life ==
From 2006 to 2011, Fox was married to Theory of a Deadman vocalist Tyler Connolly. She is currently married to Spider One. They have a daughter together.

== Filmography ==
Television
Year	Title	Role	Notes
2006	Underworld: Evolution	Tanis Vampire #1	
2007	In the Land of Women	Tanya	
2022	Allegoria	Brody	
2023	Bury the Bride	Sadie	Also writer
2024	Little Bites	Mindy Vogel	Also producer
2024	Terrifier 3	Jennifer	
