= Almost Popular =

2024 comedy film directed by Nayip Ramos

- Directed by: Nayip Ramos
- Written by: Pamela Duffy-Little; Eleni Rivera
- Production companies: Patriot Pictures; Ethos Pictures
- Distributed by: Patriot Releasing
- Release dates: June 22, 2024 (Dances With Films); August 28, 2025 (AMC Theatres)
- Running time: 95 minutes
- Country: United States
- Language: English

Almost Popular is a 2024 coming-of-age independent comedy film directed by Nayip Ramos starring Ruby Rose Turner, Reid Miller, Isabella Ferreira, Ellodee Carpenter, Elijah M. Cooper, Avi Angel, Arden Myrin, and Kathleen Rose Perkins.

== Plot ==
At Rosewood High, Susie Quinn, a junior, faces the difficulty of being socially invisible. Susie and her lifelong best friend, Bobbie Roberts, find themselves stuck in the middle tier of the high school social hierarchy, which is strictly tiered. Susie wants to change this, however, and has set her sights on the most powerful clique at the high school, the "POP Girls", consisting of Vicki Reinhard, Renee Lalita, and the rest. Susie wants nothing more than for the rest of her life to begin with her senior year, and she knows that the only way for this to happen is for her to become part of the powerful clique.

Bobbie, though skeptical, agrees to assist Susie with her plans for social climbing. Susie and Bobbie observe the POP Girls' behaviors, fashion, and social media usage. Susie attempts, though with much embarrassment, to become more visible at the high school, which only results in the rest of the students enjoying the show. Susie finally gets an invitation to the POP Girls' party, which she sees as a step in the right direction. At the party, Susie learns that the POP Girls' clique consists only of manipulation and humiliation, with Vicki clearly at the helm, while Renee appears uncomfortable with the cruel behavior of the clique, which Susie attempts to impress.

Despite these challenges, Renee approaches Susie and gives her tentative advice about dealing with the social dynamics of the school. Through her relationship with Susie, Bobbie is able to get close to the clique and witness the level of pressure they have to endure in order to remain popular. This situation forces Susie to reevaluate the costs of her own ambitions.

The situation comes to a head when Susie is given the opportunity to earn partial acceptance into the POP Girls by choosing to distance herself from Bobbie during the school assembly stunt designed to promote the clique's popularity. Susie initially complies with Vicki's request and leaves Bobbie stranded. This creates tension between the two girls. However, Susie eventually comes to her senses and publicly acknowledges her mistakes. This allows her to reconcile with Bobbie. Through her relationship with Vicki, Renee comes to realize the level of pretence required for the girls to remain popular. This realization then allows her to defect from Vicki's leadership. Susie and Bobbie are redefining what popularity means. Despite the fact that they are not part of the POP Girls, they are no longer defined by their exclusion. Susie and Bobbie begin their final year of high school.

== Cast ==
- Ruby Rose Turner as Susie Quinn
- Reid Miller as Bobbie Roberts
- Isabella Ferreira as Renee Lalita
- Ellodee Carpenter as Vicki Reinhard
- Elijah M. Cooper as Dave Simon
- Avi Angel as Alan Nalan
- Arden Myrin as Terri Reinhard
- Kathleen Rose Perkins as Mrs. Quinn

== Release ==
It premiered at Dances With Films on June 22, 2024, and was released in select AMC Theatres on August 28, 2025.

== Reception ==
On Common Sense Media, Christie Cronan rated it 3/5 stars writing that the film is "quirky teen comedy has drinking, lots of innuendo." On Film Threat, Jason Delgado scored the film an 8 out of 10 writing in his review consensus section: "Dumb and Dumber meets Mean Girls."

== See also ==
- List of coming-of-age stories
- List of LGBT-related films of 2024
- List of American comedy films
- List of comedy films of the 2020s
