= Feeling Randy =

2024 film directed by Dean Lent

- Directed by: Dean Lent
- Written by: Dean Lent
- Production company: Semblance
- Release date: November 1, 2024
- Running time: 81 minutes
- Country: United States
- Language: English

Feeling Randy is a 2024 comedy-drama film directed by Dean Lent starring Reid Miller, Jonathan Silverman, Marguerite Moreau, Tyler Lawrence Gray, Blaine Kern, Chris Mulkey, and Richard Riehle.

== Premise ==
In the late 1970s, Randy finds himself undecided about his sexual identity and, together with his teenage friends, he plans to travel to the Kitty Ranch Brothel.

== Cast ==
- Reid Miller as Randy
- Jonathan Silverman as Frank Parker
- Marguerite Moreau
- Tyler Lawrence Gray as Sampson
- Blaine Kern as Luke
- Chris Mulkey as the teacher
- Richard Riehle as Wilfred
- Kerrice Brooks as Melissa
- Shane Almagor as Adam
- Oliver Hibbs Wyman as Ginger

== Release ==
It had a limited theatrical release in the United States for Breaking Glass Pictures on November 1, 2024, followed by a digital release on November 5.

== Reception ==
In his review for Variety, Murtada Elfadl said that the film is "a sly and sweet teenage comedy that defies the expectations of its genre." In the Bay Area Reporter, David-Elijah Nahmod said the film is a "sweet '70s Bay Area-set coming of age story."

== See also ==
- List of LGBT-related films of 2024
- Simultaneous release
