= Thy Neighbor's Wife (2001 film) =

2001 American thriller film directed by Jim Wynorski

Thy Neighbour's Wife
- Directed by: Jim Wynorski
- Starring: Kari Wuhrer; Jeff Trachta; Barbara Crampton
- Production companies: Phoenician Entertainment; Artisan Entertainment
- Release date: 2001
- Running time: 92 Minutes
- Country: United States
- Language: English

Thy Neighbour's Wife, also known as Poison and Midnight Vendetta, is a 2001 erotic thriller film directed by Jim Wynorski and starring Kari Wuhrer, Jeff Trachta, and Barbara Crampton.

== Cast ==
- Kari Wuhrer as Ann Stewart / Ann Johnson
- Jeff Trachta as Scott Garrett
- Barbara Crampton as Nicole Garrett
- Melissa Stone as Darla Garrett
- Seth Adam Jones as David Garrett (credited as Seth Jones)
- John Henry Richardson as Mr. Slider (credited as Jay Richardson)
- Larry Poindexter as Chris Stewart
- John Weller as Travis
- Peggy Trentini as Karina
- Rocky DeMarco as Angela (credited as Melissa Brasselle)
- Michael Cavanaugh as Ian McMillan
- Betheny Zolt as Janelle
- Nina Dafni as Mrs. Slider
- William Langlois as Detective (credited as Bill Monroe)
- Shea Smith as Lorna (uncredited)

== See also ==
- List of American films of 2001
