= Qaher Harhash =

Palestinean male model (born 1998)

- قاهر حرش
- Born: 1998 (age 27–28); East Jerusalem
- Years active: 2015–present
- Modeling information
- Height: 1.87 m (6 ft 2 in)
- Agency: A Management (Berlin); IMG Models (London/Paris/Milan); Trend Model Management (Barcelona)

Qaher Harhash (Arabic: قاهر حرش; born 1998) is a Palestinian model and actor based in Berlin.

== Early life ==
Harhash is from Wadi Joz, East Jerusalem. He was 7 when his parents, a garage manager and stay-at-home mother, divorced. Shortly after, the IDF raided the family house and arrested his uncle during Ramadan. In response, his mother enrolled Harhash in therapy and programmes such as Seeds of Peace and the YMCA International Choir to help him process the event, which he attributes his values to. Harhash attended the Jerusalem American School in Beit Hanina.

== Career ==
With a sister who watched fashion shows growing up, Harhash was interested in modeling from a young age as inspired by Tyson Beckford in particular. He was 14 when he started to consider it more seriously. At 16, Harhash began applying to modeling agencies, but was repeatedly told the industry was not ready for a Palestinian male model and that being Palestinian would be a problem. After several rejections, he was finally accepted by Israeli models agency Roberto Models Agency. Despite the obstacles, Roberto Ben Shoshan said he knew Harhash "would be famous the moment I met him. He gave me a ton of hope." Harhash's first major shoot was with Noam Frost for Rina Zin's 2016 winter catalogue. He subsequently began meeting with agencies in Milan and received "warm" responses. He walked his first runway for Israeli fashion label Renuar and had his first editorial in Xnet.

At the suggestion of and with support from his sister, Harhash moved to Germany in 2017 for study where he signed with the Berlin-based Iconic Management in 2018 and later Nest Model Management. Harhash said "People here were so fast to accept me" as a Palestinian and that it was nice to "not be afraid that I'll be asked for my ID". Harhash had gigs with brands such as Dolce & Gabbana, Hugo Boss, Diesel, Men's Uno Hong Kong, Holzweiler and Lacoste, and appeared in the likes of Vogue Germany and Ukraine, GQ Italia and Middle East, VMan, and Avant-Garde.

In 2021, Harhash, Bella Hadid, and Omar Sesay debuted Jean Paul Gaultier's first ready-to-wear collection in six years titled Les Marins. Also that year, Harhash posted an Instagram story highlighting the lack of access to water Palestinians have in East Jerusalem compared to Israeli settlers. This prompted Zara's head designer Vanessa Perilman to send Harhash racist messages. After the messages were made public, Zara faced backlash and calls for a boycott and to fire Perilman.

The following year, Harhash starred in YSL's holiday campaign. He and Amira Al Zuhair fronted Prada's 2023 Ramadan campaign. Harhash made his acting debut in as Bahlul opposite John Early in Theda Hammel's film Stress Positions, which premiered at the 2024 Sundance Film Festival. Harhash returned to the runway in 2025, walking four SS26 shows at London Fashion Week and one in Berlin.
