= Stress Positions (film) =

2024 film by Theda Hammel

- Theatrical release poster
- Directed by: Theda Hammel
- Screenplay by: Theda Hammel
- Story by: Faheem Ali; Theda Hammel
- Produced by: Brad Becker-Parton; Allie Jane Compton; John Early; Greg Nobile; Stephanie Roush
- Starring: John Early; Theda Hammel; Qaher Harhash; Amy Zimmer; Faheem Ali; Rebecca F. Wright; Davidson Obennebo; John Roberts
- Cinematography: Arlene Muller
- Edited by: Erin DeWitt; Theda Hammel
- Music by: Theda Hammel
- Production companies: Neon; Seaview; Roller Studios
- Distributed by: Neon
- Release dates: January 18, 2024 (Sundance); April 19, 2024 (United States)
- Running time: 95 minutes
- Country: United States
- Language: English
- Box office: $105,995

Stress Positions is a 2024 American comedy drama film directed by Theda Hammel (in her feature directorial debut) with a screenplay by Hammel from a story by Faheem Ali and Hammel. It stars John Early, Hammel, Qaher Harhash, Amy Zimmer, Faheem Ali, Rebecca F. Wright, Davidson Obennebo and John Roberts.

The film premiered at the 2024 Sundance Film Festival on January 18, 2024. The film premiered in theaters on April 19, 2024.

== Premise ==
During the early months of the COVID-19 pandemic in Brooklyn, a Moroccan American young man named Bahlul (Qaher Harhash) recovers from a broken leg while quarantining with his uncle Terry (John Early).

== Cast ==
- John Early as Terry Goon
- Qaher Harhash as Bahlul, Terry's nephew
- Elizabeth Dement as Abigail, Terry's sister and Bahlul's mother
- Theda Hammel as Karla, Terry's best friend
- Amy Zimmer as Vanessa, Karla's girlfriend
- Rebecca F. Wright as Coco, Terry's neighbor
- Faheem Ali as Ronald, a Grubhub worker
- Gordon Landenberger as Friendly Neighborhood Lunatic
- Elias Abawi as Lyft Driver
- John Roberts as Leo
- Davidson Obennebo as Hamadou
- Tarek Ziad as Tarek
- Joe Van O as Photographer
- Macy Rodman as Blonde Model
- Louisa Judge as Blonde Young Woman

== Release ==
Stress Positions premiered in the U.S. Dramatic Competition at the 2024 Sundance Film Festival. It was released on April 19, 2024.

== Reception ==
=== Critical reception ===
On the review aggregator website Rotten Tomatoes, 71% of 52 critics' reviews are positive, with an average rating of 6.3/10. The website's consensus reads: "Stress Positions plays on familiar seriocomic tropes with sporadic verve, although the characters are occasionally more interesting than the story they're being used to tell." On Metacritic, the film holds a weighted average score of 62 out of 100, based on 13 critics, indicating "generally favorable" reviews.

Much of the initial critical reaction to Stress Positions centered on the film's satirical approach to issues of race, gender, and sexuality. Writing for The Hollywood Reporter, David Rooney deemed Stress Positions "busy but thin". Ryan Lattanzio of Indiewire noted the film's heavy-handed approach to social issues but praised the "wry humor" and the chemistry between Hammel and Early.

=== Accolades ===
Award	Ceremony date	Category	Recipient(s)	Result	Ref.
Sundance Film Festival	26 January 2024	Sundance Institute/Amazon MGM Studios Producers Award for Fiction	Brad Becker-Parton	Won	
