= Jakob's Wife =

2021 film by Travis Stevens

- Promotional poster
- Directed by: Travis Stevens
- Screenplay by: Kathy Charles; Mark Steensland; Travis Stevens
- Produced by: Barbara Crampton; Bob Portal; Inderpal Singh; Travis Stevens
- Starring: Barbara Crampton; Larry Fessenden; Bonnie Aarons
- Cinematography: David Matthews
- Edited by: Aaron Crozier; Travis Stevens
- Music by: Tara Busch
- Production companies: Alliance Media Partners; Eyevox Entertainment
- Distributed by: RLJE Films; Shudder
- Release dates: March 17, 2021 (SXSW); April 16, 2021 (United States)
- Running time: 98 minutes
- Country: United States
- Language: English
- Box office: $30,000

Jakob's Wife is a 2021 American vampire horror film directed and produced by Travis Stevens from a screenplay by Stevens, Kathy Charles, and Mark Steensland. The film stars Barbara Crampton, Larry Fessenden, and Bonnie Aarons.

The film had its world premiere at South by Southwest on March 17, 2021; it was released in theaters, on demand, and digitally in the United States by RLJE Films and Shudder on April 16, 2021.

== Plot ==
Anne is married to Jakob, a minister in a small town. One night, a young woman named Amelia is attacked by a vampire ("the Master"). Anne tells Jakob that a man from her past named Tom Low is visiting the town to work on a project involving a mill, and that she will meet with him. Anne and Tom meet up, and Tom says that he is surprised she wound up marrying Jakob and becoming a "church mouse", forsaking her "adventurous" side. Anne and Tom go to the mill. They briefly kiss, but Anne asserts her fidelity to Jakob. Tom is soon attacked by a swarm of rats, and Anne is attacked by the Master, who bites her neck.

Gradually, Anne transforms into a vampire. She craves blood, eats worms, starts growing new teeth, is burned by light, and appears to be under the control of the Master. At one point, the Master appears outside Anne's house and compels Anne to masturbate briefly before getting caught by Jakob.

Jakob is upset about Anne's new behavior, and suspects Tom is to blame. Jakob goes to the mill to confront Tom, but instead sees Amelia—now a vampire—attack and kill a young man. Amelia asserts that she does not want Jakob's God's love, and that she has found a new savior whose love gives her strength instead of fear. Jakob escapes from Amelia and returns home to find Anne vampirized and having attacked someone to consume his blood. Anne asserts that she was being controlled, but that she feels more alive than she has in years.

Jakob plans to track down the Master in order to return Anne to her non-vampiric state. The Master confronts Anne, telling Anne that she seeks no ownership and that she only wants to liberate Anne from an oppressive and anchoring husband. Anne responds by asserting her love for Jakob.

Anne and Jakob reconcile, and work together to help satisfy Anne's thirst for blood. Eventually, the Master confronts Anne again, asserting that she wants to help liberate Anne from the oppression of men and forced domesticity. Jakob kills the Master with a wooden stake, saying that he "finished it", but Anne responds by saying that it was not his choice to make.

Later, Anne and Jakob decide to sell their house and move away. Anne asserts that she wants to make her own decisions from now on. Jakob wants to seek a cure for Anne's vampirism, but Anne disagrees, saying that she likes who she has become. They converse tensely for a bit, and Jakob clutches a wooden stake as Anne bares her vampire teeth.

== Cast ==
- Barbara Crampton as Anne Fedder
- Larry Fessenden as Pastor Jakob Fedder
- Bonnie Aarons as The Master
- Nyisha Bell as Amelia Humphries
- Sarah Lind as Carol Fedder
- Mark Kelly as Bob Fedder
- Robert Rusler as Tom Low
- Jay DeVon Johnson as Sheriff Mike Hess
- Phil Brooks as Deputy Colton
- Omar Salazar as Oscar
- Ned Yousef as Naveed Al-Amin
- Giovannie Cruz as Mariana Al-Amin
- Armani Desirae as Little Girl
- Monica L. Henry as Dr. Meda
- Skeeta Jenkins as Butcher
- Kathe Newcomb as Mattie
- Morgan Peter Brown
- Angelie Denizard as Eli

== Release ==
The film had its world premiere at South by Southwest on March 17, 2021, with RLJE Films and Shudder acquiring the US distribution rights the month before. It was released in theaters, on demand, and digitally in the United States by RLJE Films and Shudder on April 16, 2021.

== Reception ==
Review aggregator website Rotten Tomatoes reported that 86% of 70 critics gave the film a positive review, with an average rating of 6.9/10. The site's critic consensus reads: "Jakob's Wife gives genre legend Barbara Crampton an opportunity to carry an old-school horror story—and she bloody well delivers." Metacritic assigned the film a weighted average score of 59 out of 100 based on 14 critics, indicating "mixed or average" reviews.

The Guardian gave the film 3/5 stars and said "as a comic, genre-inflected study of middle-aged female rage, it’s a gas." The Los Angeles Times praised the performances of the leads while calling the themes "a bit simplistic". /Film gave the film 6.5 out of 10 and called it "a showcase for its legendary leads". Variety negatively reviewed the film calling it "a fairly bland journey-of-self-fulfillment" and "iron-deficient".
