= Chaz Bono =

American writer, musician and actor (born 1969)

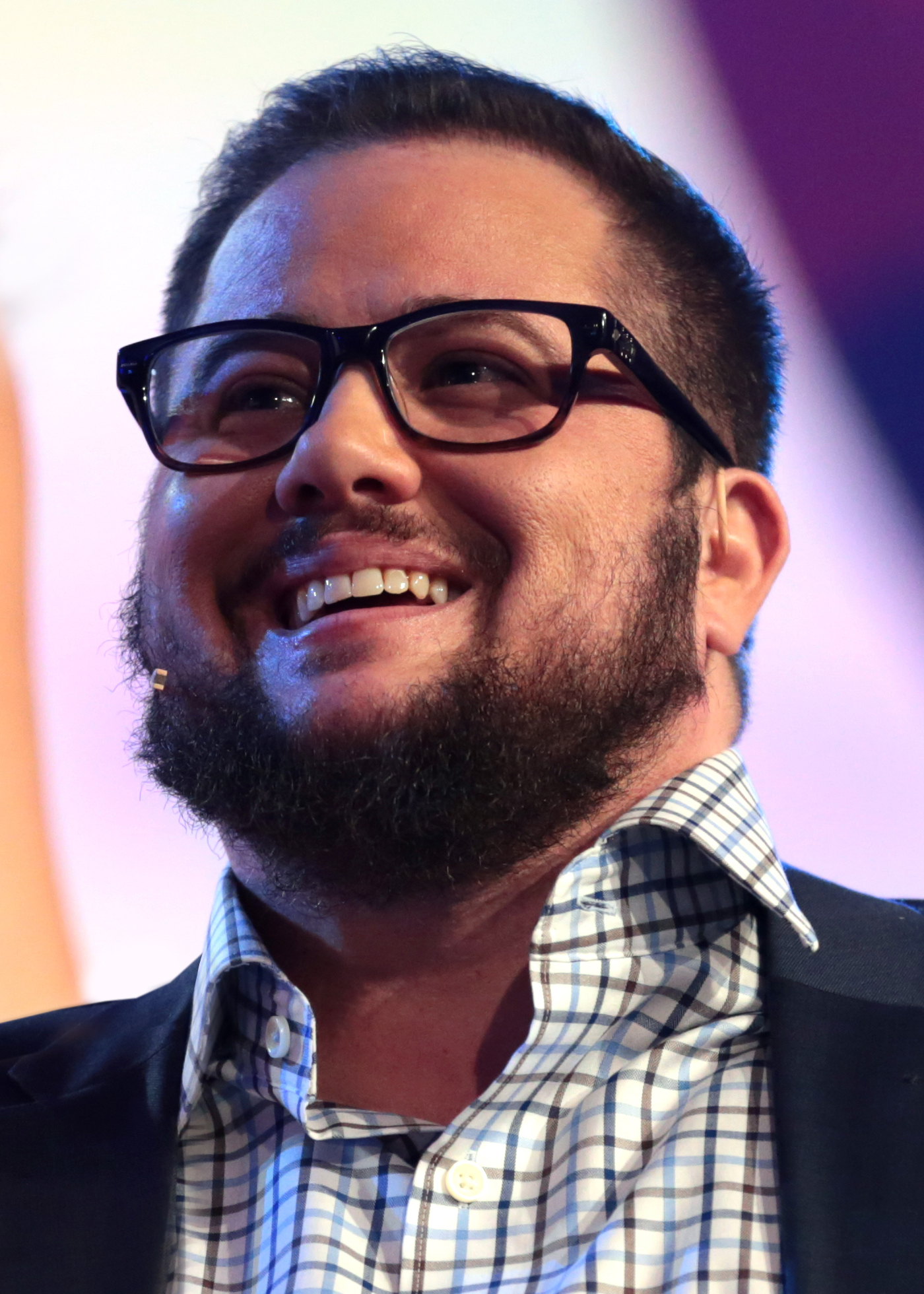
- Bono in 2017
- Born: Chastity Sun Bono; March 4, 1969 (age 57); Los Angeles, California, U.S.
- Other name: Chaz Salvatore Bono
- Occupations: Writer; musician; actor
- Years active: 1972–present
- Spouse: Shara Blue Mathes (m. 2026)
- Parents: Cher; Sonny Bono
- Relatives: Elijah Blue Allman (half-brother); Georgia Holt (grandmother)

Chaz Salvatore Bono (born Chastity Sun Bono; March 4, 1969) is an American writer, musician and actor. His parents are entertainers Sonny Bono and Cher, and he became widely known in appearances as a child on their television show, The Sonny & Cher Comedy Hour.

Chaz Bono is a trans man. In 1995, while then presenting as a woman, and several years after being outed as lesbian by the tabloid press, Chaz publicly self-identified as a lesbian in a cover story in a leading American gay monthly magazine, The Advocate. Bono eventually went on to discuss the process of coming out to oneself and others in two books: Family Outing: A Guide to the Coming Out Process for Gays, Lesbians, and Their Families (1998) includes his coming-out account. The memoir The End of Innocence (2003) discusses his outing, music career, and partner Joan's death from non-Hodgkin's lymphoma.

Between 2008 and 2010, Bono sought out a gender transition. In a June 2009 two-part CBS TV Entertainment Tonight feature, Chaz explained that his medical transition had started a year prior. In May 2010, he legally changed his ID to match his gender and name. A documentary on Bono's experience, Becoming Chaz, was screened at the 2011 Sundance Film Festival and later made its television debut on the Oprah Winfrey Network.

== Early life ==
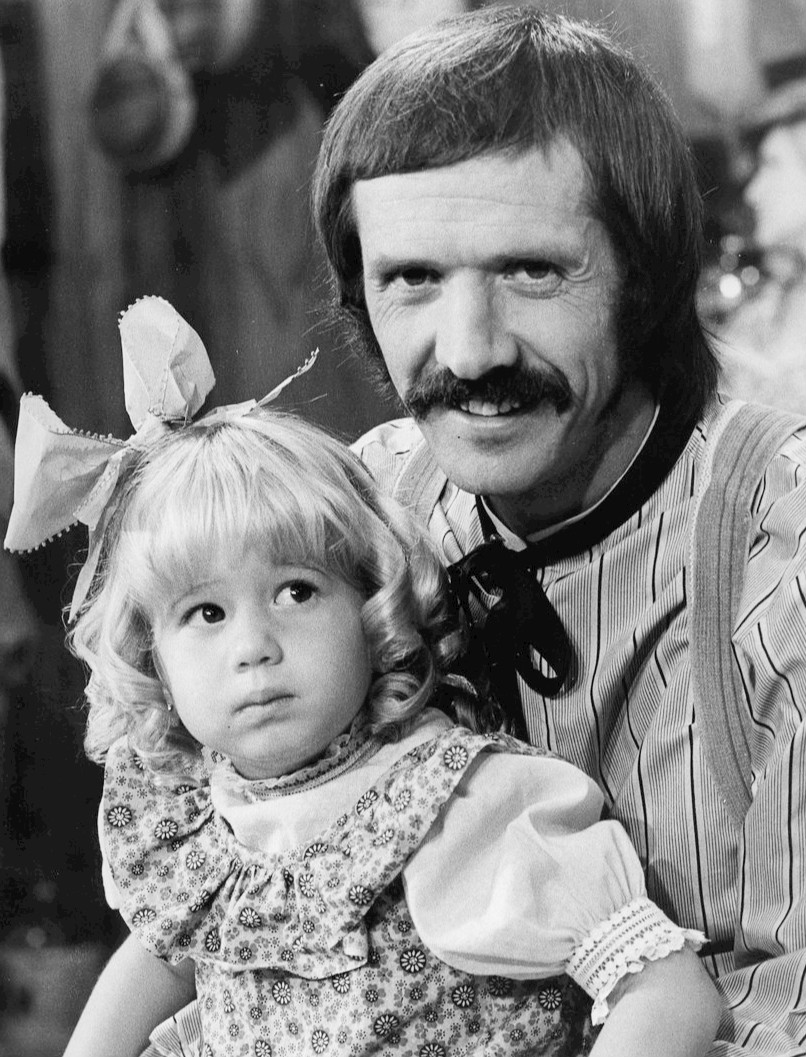
Chaz Bono (Note: as Chastity Bono) with Sonny Bono in 1974

Bono was born on March 4, 1969, in Los Angeles, California, United States, the only child of Cher and Sonny Bono of the pop duo Sonny & Cher, stars of a TV variety show on which the young child often appeared. Bono was named after the film Chastity, which was produced by Sonny and in which Cher (in her first solo role in a feature film) played a bisexual woman. Through his mother, Bono is of Armenian, Irish, English, German, French and Dutch ancestry. He is of Italian descent through his father.

Bono was enrolled at the Fiorello H. LaGuardia High School of Music & Art and Performing Arts in New York City. Bono came out to both parents as a lesbian at age 18. In Family Outing, Bono wrote that, "as a child, I always felt there was something different about me. I'd look at other girls my age and feel perplexed by their obvious interest in the latest fashion, which boy in class was the cutest, and who looked the most like cover girl Christie Brinkley. When I was 13, I finally found a name for exactly how I was different. I realized I was gay."

== Ceremony ==
Bono began a short music career in 1988 with the band Ceremony, which released one album, Hang Out Your Poetry, in 1993. The band featured Bono on vocals, acoustic guitar, and percussion. Other members were Steve March Tormé (backup vocals), Heidi Shink a.k.a. Chance, Pete McRae, Steve Bauman, Louis Ruiz, and Bryn Mathieu. All but one of the band's songs were written or co-written by Bono, Shink, and Mark Hudson. They used no synthesizers or digital effects on the album; Shink noted, "We turned our back on technology. [ ... ] It's reminiscent of the 60s, but more a tip of the hat than emulating it. We took the music we love and rejuvenated it, made it 90s." Critical reception of the album was lukewarm, with Roch Parisien of AllMusic describing Hang Out Your Poetry as a mildly psychedelic take on early 1990s pop, "pleasant, accessible, well-produced ear-candy that's ultimately toothless".

The songs "Could've Been Love" and "Ready for Love" were released as singles from the album. Sonny and Cher also recorded backing vocals for the track "Livin' It Up" on the album.

== LGBTQ activism ==
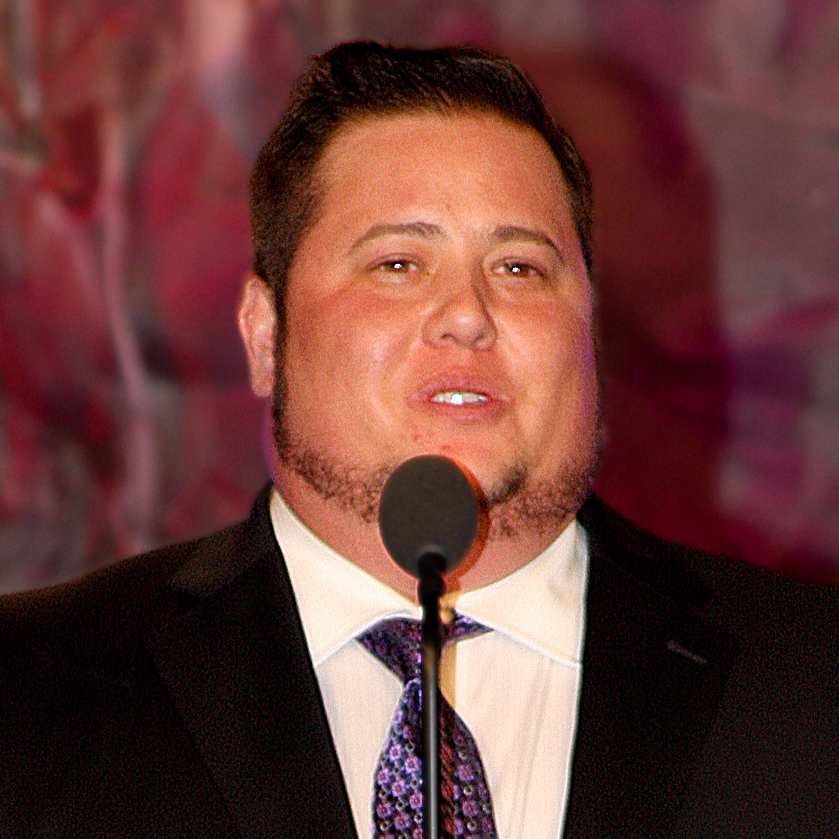
Bono at the 2012 GLAAD Awards

In April 1995, Bono came out as a lesbian in an interview with The Advocate, a national gay and lesbian magazine. The 1998 book Family Outing detailed how Bono's coming out "catapulted me into a political role that has transformed my life, providing me with affirmation as a lesbian, as a woman, and as an individual." In the same book, Bono reported that Cher, who was both a gay icon and an ally of LGBTQ communities, was quite uncomfortable with the news at first and "went ballistic" before coming to terms with it: "By August 1996, one year after I came out publicly, my mother had progressed so far that she agreed to 'come out' herself on the cover of The Advocate as the proud mother of a lesbian daughter." Cher has since become an outspoken LGBTQ rights activist.

Bono's paternal relationship became strained from November 1994, when his father was elected as a Republican Congressman from California. Their differing political views separated them, and they had not spoken for more than a year at the time of Sonny's fatal skiing accident in January 1998.

Bono worked as a writer at large for The Advocate. As a social activist, Bono became a spokesperson for the Human Rights Campaign, promoted National Coming Out Day, campaigned for the reelection of Bill Clinton for US president, campaigned against the Defense of Marriage Act, and served as Entertainment Media Director for the Gay and Lesbian Alliance Against Defamation (GLAAD). Bono was a team captain for Celebrity Fit Club 3 (2006) and was supported by girlfriend Jennifer Elia, who orchestrated exercise and training sessions.

In June 2016, the Human Rights Campaign released a video in tribute to the victims of the Orlando nightclub shooting; in the video, Bono and others told the stories of the people killed there.

== Transition ==
In mid-2008, Bono began undergoing a physical and social transition from female to male. This was confirmed in June 2009 by his publicist, who identified Bono's name as Chaz Bono and said, "It is Chaz's hope that his choice to transition will open the hearts and minds of the public regarding this issue, just as his coming out did." GLAAD and the Empowering Spirits Foundation were quick to offer praise and support for the announcement. Bono's legal transition was completed on May 6, 2010, when a California court granted his request for a gender and name change. Bono made Becoming Chaz, a documentary film about his transition that premiered at the 2011 Sundance Film Festival. The Oprah Winfrey Network acquired the rights to the documentary and debuted it on May 10, 2011.

In September 2011, he became a competitor on the 13th season of the U.S. version of Dancing with the Stars, paired with professional ballroom dancer Lacey Schwimmer. The duo was eliminated on October 25, 2011. This was the first time an openly transgender man starred on a major network television show for something unrelated to being transgender.

His book, Transition: Becoming Who I Was Always Meant to Be was published in 2012, making him the first person of Armenian descent to publish a memoir about being an openly transgender man.

== Personal life ==
On March 8, 2026, Bono married Shara Blue Mathes at the Hollywood Roosevelt Hotel in Los Angeles. The two had known each other since they were teenagers, but did not reconnect and begin dating until January 2017.

== Filmography ==
=== Film ===
Year	Title	Role	Notes
1994	Bar Girls	Scorp'	
2004	Fronterz		
2016	Dirty	Jerry the Hoarder	
2019	3 from Hell	Digby Neville	
2020	Disclosure: Trans Lives on Screen	Himself	Documentary film
2020	Reboot Camp	Herbert	mockumentary
2023	The Bell Keeper	Sheriff Carlson	
2024	Little Bites	Paul	Also executive producer

=== Television ===
Year	Title	Role	Notes
1972–1977	The Sonny & Cher Comedy Hour	Himself	32 episodes
1975	Cher	Himself	Episode 2.14
1997	Ellen	The Moderator	Episode: "Hello Muddah, Hello Faddah"
2011	Becoming Chaz	Himself	Documentary film
2011	Dancing with the Stars	Himself	6 episodes
2012	Degrassi: The Next Generation	Himself	Episode: "Tonight, Tonight: Part 2"
2013	The Secret Life of the American Teenager	Himself	Episode: "To Each Her Own"
2014	RuPaul's Drag Race	Himself/Guest Judge	Episodes: "Queens of Talk", "Reunited!"
2016	The Bold and the Beautiful	Reverend Rydale	5 episodes
2016	American Horror Story: Roanoke	Brian Wells (Lot Polk, re-enactment)	4 episodes
2016	Where the Bears Are	Gavin Kelly	3 episodes
2017	American Horror Story: Cult	Gary K. Longstreet	8 episodes
2020	Curb Your Enthusiasm	Joey Funkhouser	Episode: "The Spite Store"
2022	The Guardians of Justice	Whittaker	7 episodes

== Books written ==
- Family Outing (with Billie Fitzpatrick) (1998). Little, Brown and Company. pp. 272. ISBN 978-0316102339
- The End of Innocence: A Memoir (with Michele Kort) (2003). pp. 232. ISBN 978-1555837952
- Transition: The story of how I became a man (with Billie Fitzpatrick) (2011). New York: Dutton. ISBN 978-0525952145
- Transition: Becoming Who I Was Always Meant to Be (with Billie Fitzpatrick) (2012 paperback). Plume. pp. 272. ISBN 978-0452298002
