= Leanna Love =

Fictional character from the American CBS soap opera The Young and the Restless

- The Young and the Restless character
- Portrayed by: Barbara Crampton
- Duration: 1987–1993; 1998–2002; 2006–2007; 2023
- First appearance: October 21, 1987
- Last appearance: September 28, 2023
- Created by: William J. Bell
- Introduced by: Edward J. Scott (1987, 1998); David Shaughnessy (2002); John F. Smith (2006); Josh Griffith (2023)
In-universe information
- Other names: Leanna Randolphe; Nora Randall; Kelly Carpenter; Leanna Newman
- Occupation: Famous gossip reporter/journalist; Former Talk show host of The Leanna Love Show; Author of Newman - Man and Myth; Former advice columnist for the lovelorn; Author of Ruthless: The Victor Newman Story
- Husband: Victor Newman (1988)

Leanna Love is a fictional character from the CBS soap opera, The Young and the Restless. She was portrayed by Barbara Crampton, who departed from the role in 1993. Crampton returned from 1998 to 2002 and again from 2006 to 2007. In March 2023, Crampton returned to the show to celebrate the show’s 50th Anniversary.

Much of Leanna's history revolves around her marriage to Victor Newman.

== Creation ==
=== Casting ===
Barbara Crampton was the only actress to play Leanna. She previously had roles in soaps such as Days of Our Lives and Guiding Light. During an interview with Daily Grind House Crampton stated: "When it first started, that role was only supposed to be for three months. Then they cast me in it, and after two months they said, 'You know, it's kind of working. We’d like to keep your character for another year.' So I said OK and I worked on it for a year. Then they said, 'You know, it’s really working. We want to hire you on for another three years.' I did it for another three years, and then I did it for another two or three years after that. She had a good long run for somebody who wasn’t married and in a family on a soap opera." Crampton said there is always a possibility for Leanna to make another guest appearance. Crampton then returned to make guest appearances between 1998 and 2002 and further ones in 2006 and 2007.

=== Characterization ===
Born as Leanna Randolphe, she is known as "the unscrupulous reporter who penned Ruthless, a scandalous exposé about Victor Newman". Due to Leanna's psychotic personality, Crampton did some research in order to properly portray the character: "I had to do some investigating about what types of personality disorders she could have to make this character interesting, and I talked to a lot of psychiatrists about it. I came up with a personality profile for her that I played," she stated during an interview.

== Storylines ==
=== 1987–93 ===
Ashley Abbott had a nervous breakdown after having an abortion, ran off to New York City, and lost her memory after she was mugged. She ended up at a mental hospital where Dr. Steven Lassiter was her psychiatrist. Her father, John, eventually found her in New York and returned her to a posh private institution near Genoa City. Stephen had fallen in love with Ashley, followed, and became a resident psychiatrist there. Ashley recovered thanks to Steven's devotion, and they were married. During their honeymoon in Hawaii, they were stalked by Leanna Randolphe, a former mental patient of Stephen's who fantasized that they were lovers. After Leanna made several attempts to murder Ashley with a poisoned lei, Ashley spent most of her honeymoon sick. Ashley never found out about Leanna's connection to Stephen nor that she tried to murder her.

Leanna followed them back to Genoa City and abandoned her obsession with Stephen once she got involved with Jack Abbott, who arranged for her to write a sensational tell-all biography, under the pseudonym of Nora Randall called Ruthless: The Victor Newman Story, which would expose and destroy Victor. Ironically, Victor also hired her to write an authorized biography of his life. Without Jack's consent, or knowledge, Leanna added an extra chapter to Ruthless that chronicled Ashley's ill-fated affair with Victor, including details about her abortion and nervous breakdown. Victor was outraged, assumed his estranged wife Nikki Newman had been behind the exposé, and divorced her. In his anger, and still unaware that Leanna had written Ruthless, Victor took Leanna with him in his private jet and they marry in Las Vegas in October 1988. In February 1989, Nikki shocks the newly weds by revealing their marriage is invalid because Victor and Nikki's divorce isn't finalized. Despite the failed marriage, Victor and Leanna stay together.

On her own, Leanna used her wiles to land a job as an advice columnist for the lovelorn at a publication owned by Victor using the pen name "Leanna Love". Because Leanna felt guilty about Ruthless, and had come to genuinely care for Victor, she wrote another book called "Victor Newman - Man and Myth", using her real name, Leanna Randolphe. When Victor learned that Leanna and Jack Abbott had been lovers, he realized Leanna had written Ruthless. Victor publicly fired her from his company and sold the publication, then divorced Leanna, and remarried Nikki. Victor devised a plan to punish Jack by orchestrating a takeover of Jabot, displaced Jack, and made Brad Carlton his superior.

With the help of long-time admirer and friend of Victor, Douglas Austin, Leanna created the "I Hate Men Campaign" rallying wronged women everywhere. By a year later, Leanna had forgotten about being a man-hater and competed with Jill Foster Abbott for Rex Sterling, then again for John Abbott a year after that.

Leanna's notoriety landed her a nationally syndicated gossip talk show on television called the Leanna Love Show, and she has since made infrequent stops to Genoa City whenever juicy gossip concerning Victor is to be had.

=== 1998–2002 ===
In 1998, Victor was involved in a bitter divorce from Diane Jenkins. Diane's scheming attorney, Michael Baldwin, arranged for her to appear on Leanna's talk show, The Leanna Love Show, to gain public sympathy for her at the settlement hearing. Leanna, still bitter over the ill treatment she had received from Victor, was happy to oblige. When Victor tuned in to the show he was outraged that Diane had exposed his personal life on national television. Victor suffered major business setbacks after Diane's appearance on the show. As damage control and to expedite the divorce, Victor gave in to all of Diane's settlement demands.

Later, as revenge, Victor purchased Westmark Media, the company that owned Leanna's show, and fired Leanna and cancelled her show.

=== 2006–07 ===
In 2006, Leanna, now a journalist, returned to Genoa City to interview Ashley, who was being charged with the murder of Tom Fisher (Roscoe Born). (In reality, Ashley was covering for her amnesiac father, John Abbott.) Leanna told Ashley that she would paint a flattering picture of her in her story, but instead, she set up Ashley to make her look guilty. After the interview, Leanna left town again. In 2007, she returned once more to conduct an interview with David Chow (Vincent Irizarry) about the death of Carmen Mesta (Marisa Ramirez).
