= Tyler Lawrence Gray =

American actor (born 2002)

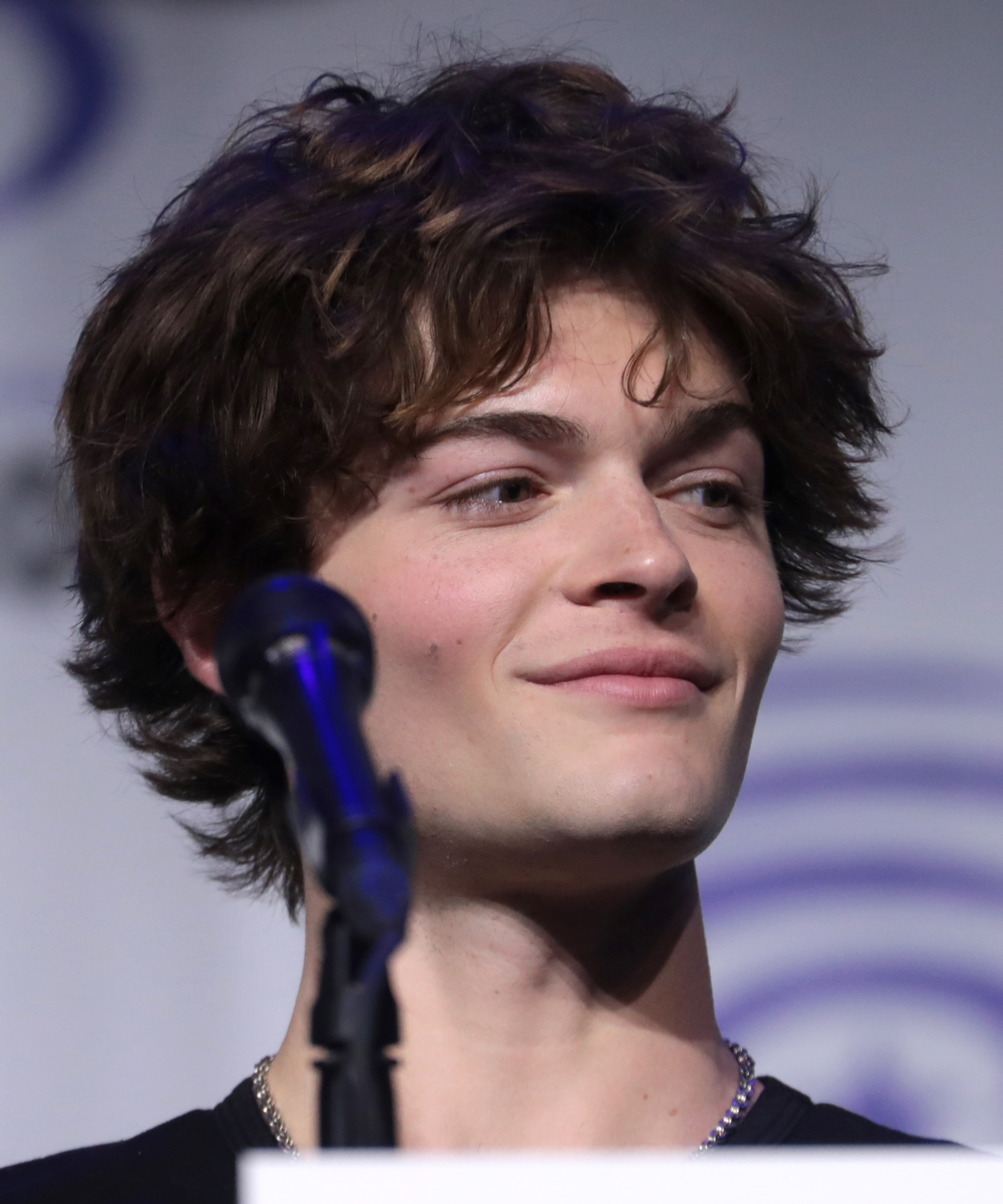
- Gray at the 2023 WonderCon
- Born: June 18, 2002 (age 24); Boston, Massachusetts, U.S.
- Occupation: Actor
- Years active: 2021–present

Tyler Lawrence Gray (born June 18, 2002) is an American actor.

He made his television debut in the Paramount+ supernatural teen series Wolf Pack as Harlan Briggs.

== Filmography ==
=== Film ===
Year	Film	Role	Notes
2024	The Girl in the Pool	Alex	
2024	Feeling Randy	Sampson	
2026	The Cure	Robbie Amandine	
TBA	Perfectly Imperfect †	Evan	Post-production
TBA	Debutantes †	Billy Ray Edwards	Post-production

=== Television ===
Year	Title	Role	Notes
2023	Wolf Pack	Harlan Briggs	Main role
2024	Tracker	Eric Dobbs	Episode: "Bloodlines"
2025	Mythic Quest	Trevor	Episode: "Rebrand"
2026	Criminal Minds	Mark Benton	Episode: "Now and Then"
2026	9-1-1 (TV series)	Student - Basketball Player	Episode: "Imposter Syndrome"

=== Web ===
Year	Title	Role	Notes
2026	Swolemates	Braydin Bridges	Webtoon micro vertical series
