= Alone with You (film) =

2021 horror film directed by Emily Bennett and Justin Brooks

- Film poster
- Directed by: Emily Bennett; Justin Brooks
- Written by: Emily Bennett; Justin Brooks
- Produced by: Andrew Corkin; Theo James
- Starring: Emily Bennett; Emma Myles; Dora Madison Burge; Barbara Crampton
- Production company: Untapped
- Distributed by: Dark Star Pictures
- Release date: 2021
- Running time: 83 minutes
- Country: United States
- Language: English

Alone with You is a 2021 psychological horror film written and directed by Emily Bennett and Justin Brooks.

== Premise ==
Charlie, a woman eagerly waiting for her girlfriend Simone to get home in order to celebrate their anniversary, becomes trapped in her apartment after the front door gets jammed.

== Cast ==
- Emily Bennett as Charlie
- Emma Myles as Simone
- Dora Madison Burge as Thea
- Barbara Crampton as Mom

== Release ==
Alone with You premiered at Fantastic Fest in 2021.

=== Critical reception ===
On the review aggregator website Rotten Tomatoes, 72% of 18 critics' reviews are positive. On Metacritic, the film has a weighted average score of 36 out of 100 based on 4 critics, which the site labels as "generally unfavorable" reviews.

Jason Delgado of Film Threat praised Bennett's "outstanding" emotional range, calling the film as a whole "entertaining and full of suspense." Debopriyaa Dutta of Screen Rant likewise gave the film a positive review, calling it "a triumph in the one-room horror genre", "able to capture the visceral nature of isolation and cabin fever, elevating them to a fever pitch." Conversely, Tomris Laffly of RogerEbert.com gave the film a negative review, calling its scares "nearly non-existent" and its camera work "amateurish."
