= Arz (rapper) =

British rapper

- Born: Rome Myers; 24 December 2003 (age 22); Hackney, London, England
- Genres: British hip hop
- Occupations: Rapper; songwriter
- Instrument: Vocals
- Years active: 2020–present

Rome Myers, known professionally as Arz, is a British rapper and songwriter hailing from North-East London. His single, "Alone With You", reached number 25 in the UK Singles Chart. It was certified platinum in the UK by BPI.

== Discography ==
=== Singles ===
Title	Year	Peak chart positions	Certifications
Title	Year	UK	Certifications
"Alone With You"	2021	25	BPI: Platinum

=== Albums/EP's ===
Title	Year
"Love Letters"	2021
"No Features"	2022
"Can't Commit"	2023
"Honey, I'm Home"	2024
"Love Letters 2"	2025
