= Barbara Crampton =

American actress (born 1958)

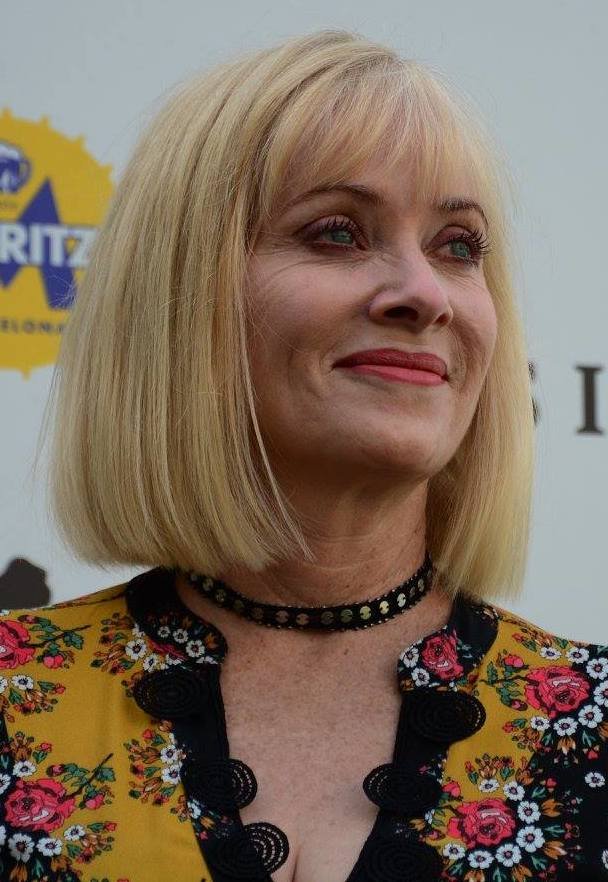
- Crampton in 2017
- Born: December 27, 1958 (age 67); Levittown, New York, U.S.
- Education: Castleton State College (BA)
- Occupation: Actress
- Years active: 1983–present
- Spouses: David Boyd (divorced): Robert Bleckman
- Children: 2

Barbara Crampton (born December 27, 1958) is an American actress and producer. She began her career in the 1980s in television soap operas before starring in horror and thriller films. In 2024, Crampton was inducted into the Rondo Hatton Classic Horror Awards' Monster Kid Hall of Fame.

Crampton made her television debut on the daytime drama Days of Our Lives (1983–84) before a supporting role as Leanna Love on the soap opera The Young and the Restless (1987–93, 1998–2002, 2006–07, and 2023). Later in her career, she appeared in television horror anthologies such as Syfy's Channel Zero: The Dream Door (2018), Hulu's Into the Dark (2019), and Shudder's Creepshow (2021).

She made her film debut in Body Double (1984), but received recognition in the comedy horror film Re-Animator (1985) as Megan Halsey and the science-fiction film From Beyond (1986) as Dr. Katherine McMichaels. Her later defining roles include Chopping Mall (1986), Puppet Master (1989), Castle Freak (1995), You're Next (2011), We Are Still Here (2015), Little Sister (2016), Puppet Master: The Littlest Reich (2018), and Jakob's Wife (2021), for which she was nominated for Critics' Choice Super Awards.

== Early life ==
Crampton was born December 27, 1958, in Levittown, Long Island, New York. She was raised Roman Catholic. Crampton grew up in Vermont, and spent summers traveling the country with the carnival, as her father was a carny. She started acting in school plays when she was in seventh grade, and went on to study acting in high school. She attended Castleton State College in Vermont, graduating with a bachelor of arts degree in theater arts. After graduation, Crampton made a brief stop in New York, where she appeared as Cordelia in King Lear for the American Theater of Actors.

== Career ==
From New York, Crampton moved to Los Angeles, and made her television debut on the daytime drama Days of Our Lives, playing Trista Evans Bradford. She subsequently starred in the pilot episode of Rituals, the television film Love Thy Neighbor, and the television series Santa Barbara. She made her film debut in the 1984 film Body Double. The following year, Crampton portrayed Chrissie in Fraternity Vacation, Megan Halsey in Re-Animator, and Stacy in Hotel. In 1986, Crampton portrayed Suzie Lynn in Chopping Mall, Dr. Katherine McMichaels in From Beyond, and Anne White in Prince of Bel Air. In 1987, Crampton was cast in Kidnapped and portrayed Teri in the TV series Ohara. From 1987 to 2007, Crampton played Leanna Love in The Young and the Restless. In 2023, she returned to the role for the show's 50th anniversary. In 1989, Crampton had a cameo role in the horror film Puppet Master. In 1991, Crampton portrayed Sadie Brady in Trancers II.

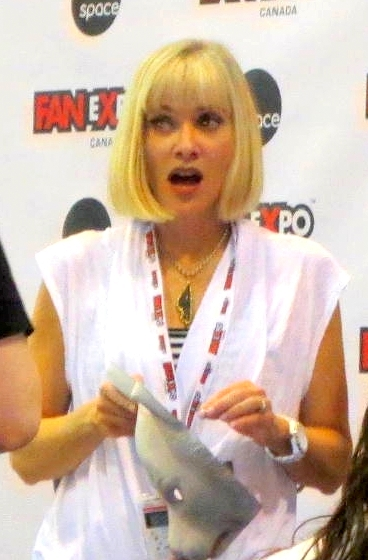
Crampton in 2013

In 1993, Crampton portrayed archeologist Dr. Leda Fanning in Robot Wars with Don Michael Paul. That year, she also guest-starred on Civil Wars; she portrayed Mindy Lewis on Guiding Light from 1993 to 1995, and left when her contract expired and she got engaged to L.A.-based actor and director Kristoffer Tabori in April 1995. By September of the same year, their engagement was called off. In 1995, Crampton starred in Castle Freak. From 1995 to 1998, Crampton portrayed Maggie Forrester on The Bold and the Beautiful. In 1996, Crampton portrayed Carol in Space Truckers. In 1997, Crampton guest starred on The Nanny. The following year, she guest-starred on Party of Five and starred in the film The Godson. In 1999, Crampton guest-starred on the television series Pacific Blue.

In 2001, Crampton had a recurring role as Dr. Leslie Bogan in five episodes of the television series Spyder Games and starred in the movie Thy Neighbor's Wife. Crampton starred in the films The Sisterhood (2004), Read You Like a Book (2006), and Never Enough (2008). She was a special guest at Creation Entertainment's Weekend of Horror 2010. She had a supporting role in the 2011 horror slasher film You're Next, and played the leading role of Anne Sacchetti in We Are Still Here (2015). Both films received positive reviews from critics.

Crampton next appeared in Abner Pastoll's European thriller Road Games (2015), in which she speaks both French and English. In 2015 she starred along with fellow horror icons Danny Trejo, Kane Hodder, Bill Moseley, Michael Berryman, Doug Bradley, Gunnar Hansen, Ken Foree, and Dee Wallace in the Harrison Smith horror film Death House.

In 2018, Crampton was given the Horror Channel Lifetime Achievement Award at Grimmfest in Manchester, United Kingdom.

In 2021, Crampton produced and starred in the horror-drama Jakob's Wife, which she developed over the course of several years. The same year, she voiced serial killer Nicolette Aster in an audio drama adaptation of Our Lady of the Inferno and appeared in the Lovecraftian film Sacrifice. Also that year she did a voice role for the first-person shooter video game Back 4 Blood, as Mom.

== Personal life ==
In December 1986, Crampton appeared in a nude pictorial in Playboy magazine titled "Simply Beastly. Behind every successful monster, there's a woman."

She was married to director of photography David Boyd.

As of 2015, Crampton lived in Mill Valley, California, with her husband, financial executive Robert Bleckman, her two children, and her adult stepson.

== Filmography ==
=== Film ===
Year	Title	Role	Notes
1984	Body Double	Carol	
1985	Fraternity Vacation	Chrissie	
1985	Re-Animator	Megan Halsey	
1986	Chopping Mall	Suzie Lynn	
1986	From Beyond	Dr. Katherine McMichaels	Nominated – Saturn Award for Best Actress
1987	Kidnapped	Bonnie	
1988	Pulse Pounders	Said Brady	Segment: "The Evil Clergyman". Considered a lost film until the discovery of a workprint in 2011 where it was then digitally restored and released.
1989	Puppet Master	Woman At Carnival	Cameo
1991	Trancers II	Sadie Brady	Direct-to-video
1993	Robot Wars	Dr. Leda Fanning	
1995	Castle Freak	Susan Reilly	Direct-to-video
1996	Space Truckers	Carol	
1998	The Godson	Goldy	
1999	Cold Harvest	Christine Chaney	
2000	Learning to Surf		
2001	Thy Neighbor's Wife	Nicole Garrett	
2004	The Sisterhood	Ms. Master	
2006	Read You Like a Book	Zoe	
2008	Never Enough	Dr. Gladmore	
2011	You're Next	Aubrey Davison	
2012	The Lords of Salem	Virginia Cable	
2013	Paisley	Christine	
2013	The Cartridge Family	Mom	Short film
2013	The Well	Grace	
2014	Sun Choke	Irma	
2015	We Are Still Here	Anne Sacchetti	Nominated—Fangoria Chainsaw Award for Best Actress
2015	The Divine Tragedies	Mother	
2015	Road Games	Mary	Also producer
2015	Tales of Halloween	Witch	Segment: "Grim Grinning Ghost"
2016	Beyond the Gates	Evelyn	Also producer
2016	Little Sister	The Reverend Mother	
2016	Day of Reckoning	Stella	
2017	Death House	Dr. Karen Redmane	
2017	Replace	Dr. Rafaela Crober	
2018	Dead Night	Leslie Bison	
2018	Reborn	Lena O'Neill	Independent Horror Movie Award for Best Actress; Nominated—Horrible Imaginings Film Festival Award for Best Actress in a Feature Film
2018	Puppet Master: The Littlest Reich	Carol Doreski	
2019	In Search of Darkness	Herself	Documentary
2020	Run Hide Fight	Mrs. Jane Crawford	
2020	Stay Home	Barbara	Short film
2020	In Search of Darkness: Part II	Herself	Documentary
2020	Sacrifice	Renate Nygard	
2020	Castle Freak	—N/a	Producer
2021	Jakob's Wife	Anne Fedder	Also producer Nominated—Critics' Choice Super Award for Best Actress in a Horror Movie; Nominated—Fangoria Chainsaw Award for Best Actress
2021	King Knight	Ruth	
2021	Superhost	Vera	
2021	Alone with You	Mom	
2022	Glorious	—N/a	Producer
2023	Onyx the Fortuitous and the Talisman of Souls	Nancy	
2023	Suitable Flesh	Dr. Daniella Upton	Also producer
2023	Blackout	Kate	
2023	The Last Stop in Yuma County	Virginia	
2024	Snow Valley	Ellen	
2024	Roger is a Serial Killer	Carol	Short film
2026	V/H/S/Mixtape	Vanessa	Segment Dance, Dance, Dance, Dance

=== Television ===
Year	Title	Role	Notes
1983–1984	Days of Our Lives	Trista Evans Bradford	
1984	Rituals	Sandy Hutchison	Episode: "Pilot"
1984	Love Thy Neighbor	Carol	Television film
1984	Santa Barbara	Paula	
1985	Hotel	Stacy	Episode: "Obsessions"
1986	Prince of Bel Air	Anne White	Television film
1987	Ohara	Teri	Episode: "Toshi"
1987–1993, 1998–2002, 2006–2007, 2023	The Young and the Restless	Leanna Love	Nominated – Soap Opera Digest Award for Outstanding Villainess in a Drama Series – Daytime (1990)
1993	Civil Wars	Michele Connolly	Episode: "Dances with Sharks"
1993–1995	Guiding Light	Mindy Lewis	
1995–1998	The Bold and the Beautiful	Maggie Forrester	Nominated – Soap Opera Digest Award for Outstanding Female Scene Stealer (1996)
1997	The Nanny	Barbara Crampton	Episode: "The Heather Biblow Story"
1998	Party of Five	Woman Shopper	Episode: "Tender Age"
1999	Pacific Blue	Gloria Stockwell	Episode: "Infierno"
2001	Spyder Games	Dr. Leslie Bogan	5 episodes
2001	Lightning: Fire from the Sky	Mayor Sylvia Scott	Television film
2018	Channel Zero	Vanessa Moss	Season 4: The Dream Door (6 episodes)
2019	Into the Dark	Betty	Episode: "Culture Shock"
2021	Creepshow	Victoria	Episode: "Pipe Screams"
2023	Ollie & Scoops	Eleanore Grimson	Voice; episode: "A Night at Claudia's"

=== Video games ===
Year	Title	Role	Notes
2023	The Texas Chain Saw Massacre	Virginia	Voice
2026	Mewgenics	Cat voice variant	Voice
