= Reid Miller =

American actor

Reid Miller (born 1999 or 2000) is an American actor. He portrayed Jadin Bell in the 2020 film Joe Bell.

He was born in Tennessee and raised in Texas.

== Filmography ==
=== Film ===
Year	Title	Role	Notes
2014	The Piñata	Boy	Short film
2014	Avian Avengers	Tommy	Short film
2014	The Tric in Me	Student	Short film
2015	Fantasy	Teen Spencer	Short film
2015	Wicho	Wicho	Short film
2015	G Rated Fight Club	Tyler Durden (voice)	Short film
2015	Eggplant	Durian (voice)	Short film
2016	Gloves	Tommy	Short film
2016	Marty: A Wild West Neverland	Marty	Short film
2016	Ticket Like a Man	Little Jerk	Short film
2016	Milvio	Milvio	Short film
2017	Wyrm	Wyrm	Short film
2018	F.R.E.D.I.	Danny	
2018	A Love Deed	Jonathan Jay	Short film
2018	Santa Jaws	Cody	
2018	Flikker	Young Man	Short film
2020	Joe Bell	Jadin Bell	
2020	Jaeger	Kade	Short film
2022	A Little White Lie	Dylan	
2023	Who Are You People	Arthur	
2023	Random Check	Jason	Short film
2023	The Bell Keeper	Liam	
2024	Almost Popular	Bobbie Roberts	previously reported as Nice Girls Not
2024	Feeling Randy	Randy	
TBA	Nutmeg & Mistletoe †	TBA	Post-production

=== Television ===
Year	Title	Role	Notes
2014	About a Boy	Boy at Ballpark (uncredited)	1 episode
2015	Get Educated	Mikey	1 episode
2015	The Fourth Door	Young Colin	12 episodes
2015	Connect	Henry Voss	1 episode
2015	Playhouse of Cards: The Web Series	Frank Underwood	4 episodes
2016	Criminal Minds	Adam Morrisey	1 episode
2016	Mr. Student Body President	Evan Bergdorf	2 episodes
2017	Rounds	Young Liam	1 episode
2017	Training Day	Young Luke	1 episode
2017	The Fosters	Andy	1 episode
2018	Don't Go Alone	Tommy	Miniseries; 1 episode
2018-2019	A Girl Named Jo	Allen Alvarez	12 episodes
2019	You	Goetz	1 episode
2017-2019	Play by Play	Pete Hickey	24 episodes
2022	Boo, Bitch	Brad	Miniseries; 7 episodes
2023	Accused	Danny	1 episode
