= Macy Rodman =

American musician (born 1989)

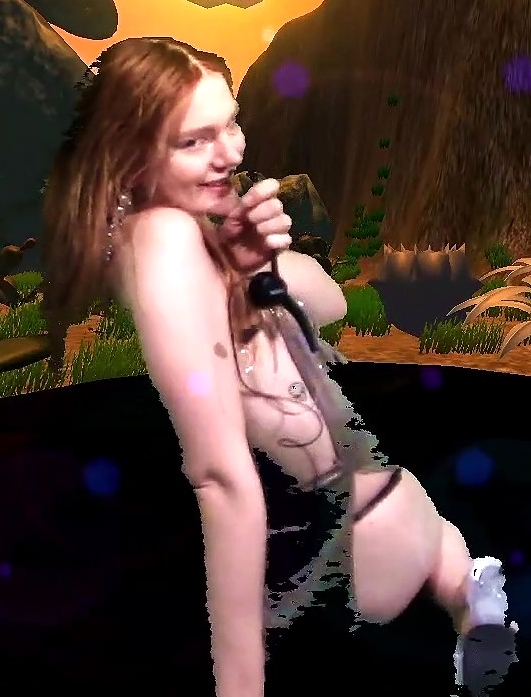
- Rodman in 2018

Background information
- Born: 1989 (age 36–37); Juneau, Alaska, U.S.
- Genres: Punk rock; experimental pop; psychedelic pop; bubblegum pop; indie pop
- Occupations: singer-songwriter; comedian; podcaster; performance artist; former drag queen
- Years active: 2016–present
- Labels: Sweat Equity; Accidental Popstar

Macy Lee Brown, known professionally as Macy Rodman (born 1989) is an American singer-songwriter, comedian, podcaster, writer, actor and performance artist. Rodman's style combines punk and rock with 90s inspired club-pop beats, eliciting comparisons to Tori Amos, PJ Harvey, Sinéad O'Connor, Portishead, Madonna, Liz Phair, and Courtney Love. She has released four studio albums: The Lake (2017), Endless Kindness (2019), Unbelievable Animals (2021), and Scald (2025).

== Early and personal life ==
Rodman was born in Juneau, Alaska in 1989 and moved to New York City at age 18 in 2008 to go to the Parsons School of Design. She later dropped out. Rodman is a transgender woman and started her transition shortly after moving to the city. She previously lived in Brooklyn, New York, and has since relocated to Madrid, Spain with her husband, whom she married in November 2024.

== Career ==
Rodman became involved in the Brooklyn drag scene after moving to New York through DJing and performing. She has mentioned that she chose the stage name Macy Rodman while performing in drag as a joke, initially, stating, 'You may see rod, man,' in an older Nymphowars podcast episode. She then began to host a weekly alternative drag show called Bathsalts. In 2014, Rodman designed the wigs, make up, and costumes for Femme Fatale Theatre's production of Oscar Wilde's Vera; or, The Nihilists. Rodman was featured on the cover of My Comrade, an underground magazine covering drag in June 2022.

Rodman released her debut EP, Help, in 2016. Her first two albums, The Lake and Endless Kindness, were released in 2017 and 2019 respectively, on Sweat Equity. She released two remix EPs, called Neovaginal Dilation Expansion Packs, in 2020 for her songs "Berlin" and "Vaseline". Rodman signed to Shamir's Accidental Popstar Records in 2021, and released her third studio album, Unbelievable Animals, the same year. Rodman wrote the songs for the album during the COVID-19 lockdown. The album consists of twelve songs written in the span of a month deals with heartbreak and pandemic anxiety and combines "radio-rock shine with dirt-punk roots, like the energy in a '90s nightclub", with "a dash of Ray of Light-esque experimental pop and Chromatica-style club bangers." In 2022, she produced Ysak's single "Crossroads." On March 4, 2022, Rodman released an EP of Unbelievable Animals remixes called Uncontrollable Flammables, featuring remixes from Ariel Zetina, False Witness, Veronica Electronica, Michete, Yufi, Jim Cannon, Penelopi, So Drove, and M Zavos. In 2023, she remixed Softee's song "Isn't Enough," and in 2024 she performed at Doll Invasion on Fire Island. In advance of her fourth LP Scald, Rodman released the singles "TSPG69" and "5 Mile Gyre" in May and August, 2025, respectively. Scald was released October 10, 2025.

Rodman hosts the improvisational comedy podcast Nymphowars with Theda Hammel. In 2023, she appeared in Cole Escola's short film Our Home Out West. She appeared in Darren Aronofsky's 2025 film Caught Stealing, and had her short story 'Annie the Clown' published in issue 6 of The Whitney Review magazine.

== Discography ==
=== Studio albums ===
| Title | Album details |
|---|---|
| The Lake | Released: June 25, 2017; Label: Sweat Equity NYC; Format: Digital download, streaming |
| Endless Kindness | Released: November 8, 2019; Label: Sweat Equity NYC; Format: Digital download, streaming |
| Unbelievable Animals | Released: August 27, 2021; Label: Accidental Popstar Records; Format: Digital download, streaming |
| Scald | Released: October 10, 2025; Label: Sea Bream Records; Format: Digital download, streaming |

=== Remix albums ===
| Title | Album details |
|---|---|
| Uncontrollable Flammables | Released March 4, 2022; Label: Accidental Popstar Records; Format: Digital download, streaming |

=== Extended plays ===
| Title | Album details |
|---|---|
| Help | Released: February 15, 2016; Label: Self-released; Format: Digital download |
| Neovaginal Dilation Expansion Pack vol. 1: BERLIN | Released: September 4, 2020; Label: Sweat Equity NYC; Format: Digital download |
| Neovaginal Dilation Expansion Pack vol. 2: VASELINE | Released: November 6, 2020; Label: Sweat Equity NYC; Format: Digital download |

=== Singles ===
| Title | Year | Album |
|---|---|---|
| "Shiny" | 2018 | Shiny/My Car (split single with DJ Delish) |
| "Greased Up Freak (Part 1)" | 2019 | Endless Kindness |
| "Love Me!" | 2021 | Unbelievable Animals |
| "Rock 'N' Roll Gay Guy" | 2021 | Unbelievable Animals |
| "Punk Rock Boyfriend" (with Shamir) | 2021 | Unbelievable Animals |
| "Hazy Shade of Winter" | 2021 | Non-album single |
| "TSPG69" | 2025 | Scald |
| "5 Mile Gyre" | 2025 | Scald |
