= Theda Hammel =

American filmmaker, musician, and podcaster

- Occupations: Filmmaker, musician, podcaster
- Known for: Stress Positions, My Trip to Spain
- Notable work: Stress Positions

Theda Hammel is an American filmmaker, musician, and podcaster. She is best known for directing the 2024 comedy film Stress Positions and co-hosting the NYMPHOWARS podcast with Macy Rodman.

== Career ==
Hammel began releasing music under the name HAMM in 2016 and earned a master's degree in Music Technology from New York University Steinhardt in 2018.

In 2018, Hammel portrayed Marie in a production of Wallace Shawn's 1978 play Marie and Bruce, directed by Knud Adams and produced by John Early.

Hammel's satirical short film My Trip to Spain premiered at the virtual 2022 Sundance Film Festival. Her feature-length directorial debut, Stress Positions, was showcased in the U.S. Dramatic Competition at the 2024 Sundance Film Festival.

She also has appeared in two films by director Louise Weard, Castration Movie Anthology i. Traps and Castration Movie Anthology ii. The Best of Both Worlds.

Hammel has co-hosted the podcast NYMPHOWARS with friend Macy Rodman since 2018, in which the two discuss queer culture, sex and their personal lives through generally a post ironic lens.

Additionally, Hammel has appeared on a number of other podcasts including Straightiolab, Seeking Derangements, Sloppy Seconds with Big Dipper & Meatball, Celebrity Book Club with Steven & Lily, Movie Mindset and Office Hours with Tim Heidecker.

== Personal life ==
Hammel is a transgender woman.

== Acting credits ==
=== Film ===
Year	Title	Role	Notes	Ref
2022	My Trip to Spain	Alexis	Also writer, director and editor	
2024	Stress Positions	Karla	Also writer, director, co-editor and composer	
2025	Castration Movie Anthology ii. The Best of Both Worlds	Felicity		

=== Television ===
Year	Title	Role	Notes	Ref.
2018	This is Heaven	Theda	TV movie	

=== Theatre ===
Year	Title	Role	Notes	Ref.
2018	Marie and Bruce	Marie	—N/a	

== Filmography ==
=== Film ===
Year	Title	Director	Writer	Actress	Notes	Ref.
2024	Stress Positions	Yes	Yes		Feature directorial debut Also composer, actress and co-editor	
2025	Castration Movie Anthology ii. The Best of Both Worlds			Yes		

=== Short film ===
Year	Title	Director	Writer	Sound	Notes	Ref.
2022	My Trip to Spain	Yes	Yes		Also composer, actress, and editor	
2019	Rachel			Yes	Sound mixing and foley	

== Discography ==
=== As HAMM. ===
Albums

Release Date	Title	Songs	Notes	Ref.
Oct. 27, 2016	Very Great	"Fun", "Brick", "A Life With No Joy In It"	available on Bandcamp	
May 17, 2017	SondHamm	"Every Day a Little Death", "Children Will Listen", "Happiness", "Sunday"	available on Bandcamp, collection of covers of works composed by Stephen Sondheim	
Dec.16, 2017	Partial Magic	"Partial Magic", "Uninterrupted Black", "Full of LIGHT!!!!!", "With So Little To Be Sure Of", "Whatever Happened to Christmas?"	available on Bandcamp	

==== Singles ====
Year	Title	Notes	Ref.
2020	"wichtige Kunstlieder"	—N/a	
