= Gotham Writers' Workshop =

American adult-education writing school

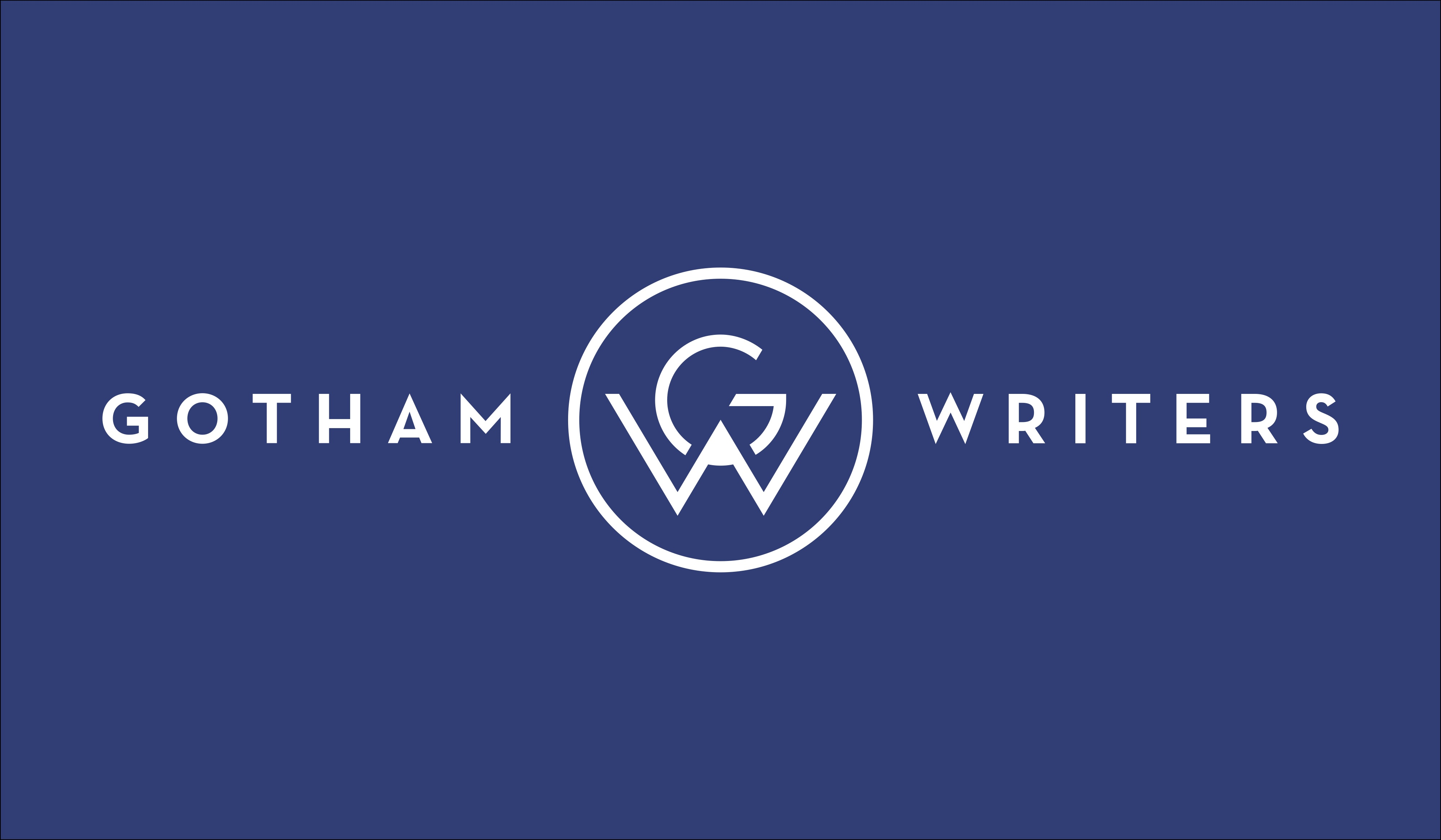
- Formation: 1993
- Purpose: Writing classes and workshops
- Headquarters: 555 8th Ave, New York, NY 10018
- President: Alexander Steele
- Website: https://www.writingclasses.com

Gotham Writers' Workshop is an adult-education program for aspiring writers based in New York City. Established in 1993, it offers courses in-person and online, and has been recognized for its classes in science fiction and mystery writing. In 2004, it published Gotham Writers' Workshop Fiction Gallery: Exceptional Short Stories Selected by New York's Acclaimed Creative Writing School.

The workshop also organizes the Stella Kupferberg Memorial Short Story Contest. Gotham Writers Workshop has been called "the city's premiere writing workshop" by Culture Trip magazine.

== Background ==
The Gotham Writers' Workshop was founded by owners David Grae and Jeff Fligelman, whose backgrounds are in business and advertising, in 1993. They rented out space from a local church. Both Grae and Fligelman had previously taught writing classes before.

== Programming ==
=== Classes ===
Gotham Writers Workshop offers classes in creative writing and business writing, along with writing conferences and one-on-one services, including consults on publishing guidance with literary agents.

Gotham classes are offered in-person in New York City, on Zoom, and asynchronously online. They offer courses in types of writing (fiction, memoir, screenwriting, non-fiction, etc.) and also in specific elements of writing (character, plot, grammar, etc.). Gotham also offers fiction classes in collaboration with Zoetrope: All Story, the literary magazine founded by Francis Ford Coppola.

The format of classes is typically lectures, writing exercises, and workshopping sessions. Courses can be self-paced and asynchronous, meaning that students are encouraged to work through the material at a pace that works for them.

==== Teen Creative Writing Workshop ====
Poster for Gotham Writers Workshop Winter 2015

The Teen Creative Writing Workshop is aimed at students ages 13-17 and lasts six weeks. The class is designed to encourage young writers to become comfortable sharing their work with others.

=== Free events ===
Gotham also offers free events, including free Write-Ins, every Friday on Zoom.

=== Annual Conference ===
Gotham Writers Workshop hosted its first annual writing conference in 2019. It lasts two days and features panels of authors discussing their work and process. Some talks may include audience participation and exercises to improve one's own writing.

=== Output ===
Gotham Writers Workshop has produced three books, edited by school President Alexander Steele: Writing Fiction, Fiction Gallery, and Writing Movies. Writing Fiction is available in several foreign language editions: Escribir ficcion (Spanish); Lezioni di scrittura creativa (Italian); Romane und Kurzgeschichten schreiben (German); and Kezdő írók kézikönyve (Hungarian). Writing Movies is available as Escribir Cine (Spanish).

== Faculty ==
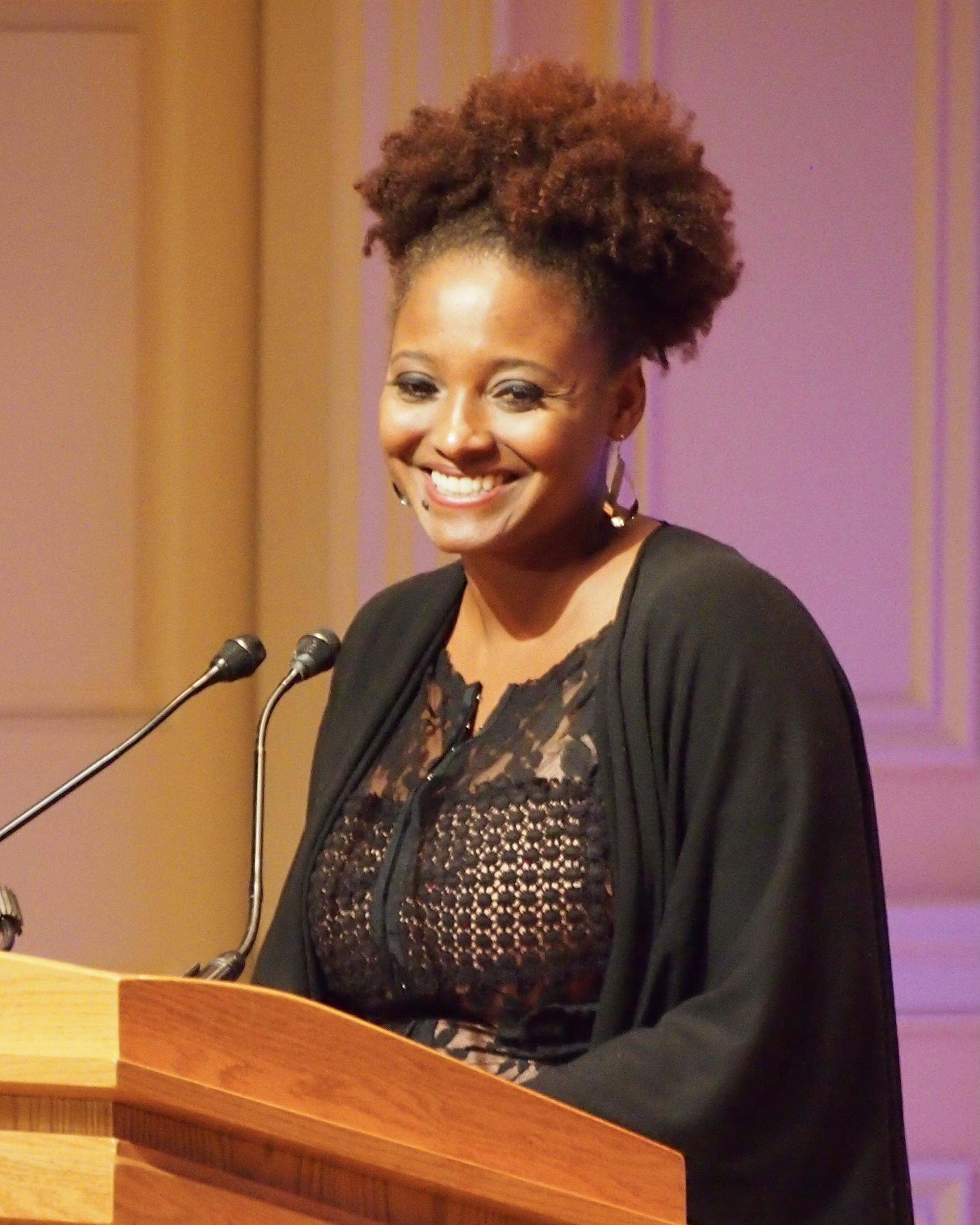
Tracy K. Smith, former faculty of Gotham Writers' Workshop, and Pulitzer Prize winner

Gotham faculty are all working writers, published or produced in their fields, as well as experienced teachers.

Gotham's current faculty members include:

- Instructor and current dean of faculty Kelly Caldwell
- NY Times bestselling novelist Tatjana Soli
- Romance novelist Leigh Michaels
- Romance novelist Kristin Rockaway
- Mystery novelist Carole Buggé
- Joyland editor-in-chief Michelle Lyn King
- Graphic memoirist Teresa Wong
- Children's book author Kody Keplinger
- Newbery medalist, children's book author Erin Entrada Kelly
- Broadcast journalist David W. Berner

Gotham's former faculty members include:

- NY Times bestselling novelist Ann Napolitano
- NY Times bestselling novelist Laura Dave
- Booker Prize winner, novelist Marlon James
- NY Times bestselling nonfiction author Ada Calhoun
- Newbery medalist, children's book author Matt de la Peña
- Oscar winning screenwriter and director Jennifer Lee
- Pulitzer Prize winner, poet Tracy K. Smith
- Hugo and Nebula Award winner, science fiction author Ken Liu
- Bram Stoker Award winner, horror author Sarah Langan

== Students ==
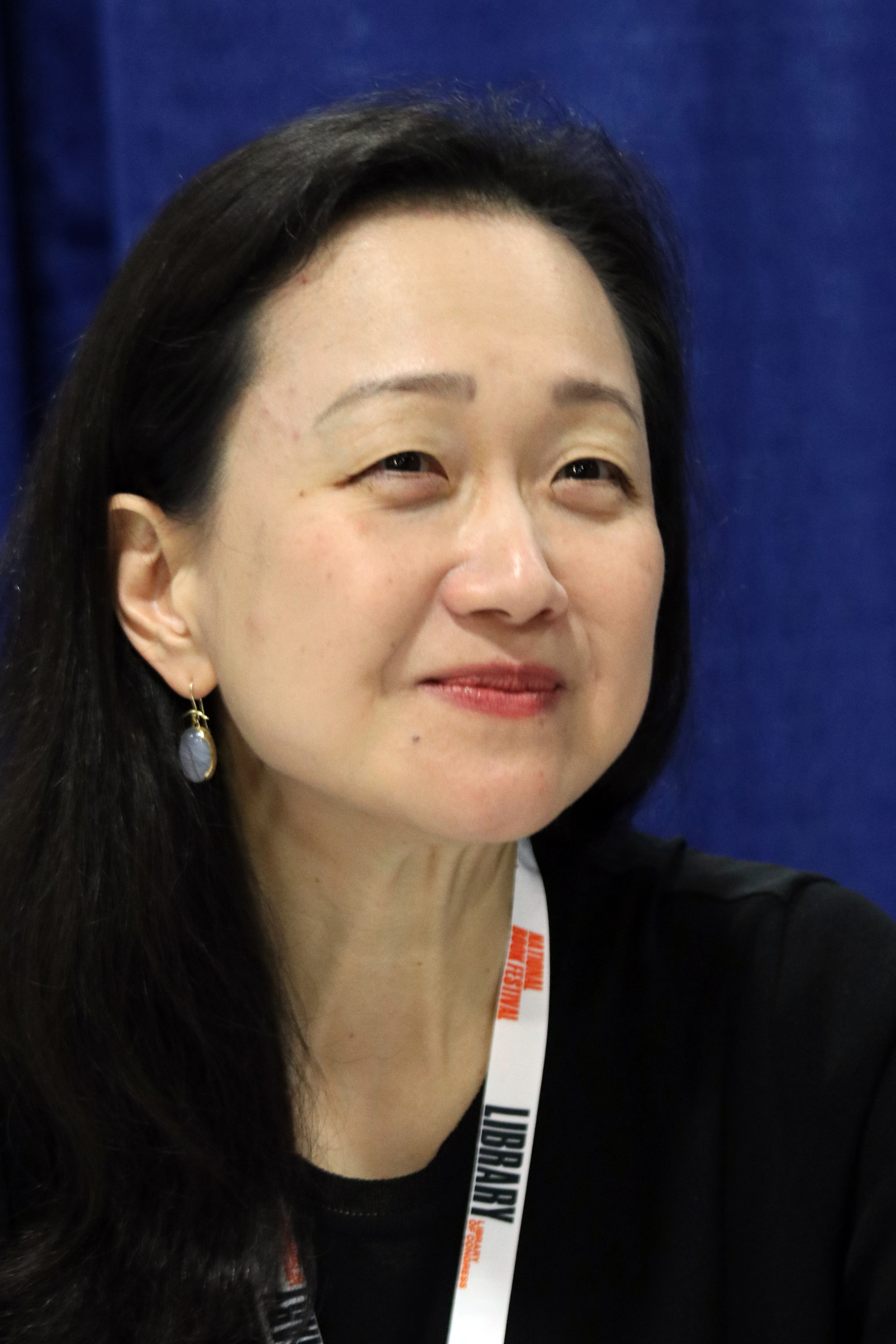
Min Jin Lee, alumni of Gotham Writers' Workshop, and author of Pachinko

Gotham draws approximately 8,000 students per year, from practically every country in the world. Most Gotham classes are for students age 18 or over, with the exception of the teen courses, for ages 13–17.

Notable alumni of Gotham include:

- National Book Award finalist, novelist Min Jin Lee
- Novelist Daisy Alpert Florin, author of My Last Innocent Year
- Novelist, essayist, and poet Melissa Broder
- National Book Award finalist, memoirist Grace M. Cho
- Memoirist T Kira Madden
- Mystery novelist Sally Andrew
- Edgar Award winner, mystery novelist Angie Kim
- NY Times bestelling children's book author Adam Silvera
- Emmy nominated TV writer Debora Cahn
- Playwright, screenwriter, and TV writer Wendy Riss Gatsiounis
- Magazine editor and writer Cara Kagan
