= Dear Edward (TV series) =

2023 drama television series

- Genre: Drama
- Created by: Jason Katims
- Based on: Dear Edward by Ann Napolitano
- Starring: Taylor Schilling; Colin O'Brien; Anna Uzele; Idris DeBrand; Carter Hudson; Maxwell Jenkins; Amy Forsyth; Audrey Corsa; Eva Ariel Binder; Brittany S. Hall; Khloe Bruno; Connie Britton; Jenna Qureshi; Dario Ladani Sanchez; Douglas M. Griffin; Ivan Shaw
- Music by: Jonathan Sanford
- Opening theme: Hold On by Lizzy McAlpine
- Country of origin: United States
- Original language: English
- No. of seasons: 1
- No. of episodes: 10

Production
- Executive producers: Jason Katims; Jeni Mulein; Fisher Stevens; Ann Napolitano
- Producers: Patrick Ward; LaDarian Smith
- Cinematography: David Boyd; Tim Bellen
- Editors: Geoffrey Richman; Peter Forslund; Tad Dennis; Angela Catanzaro
- Production companies: True Jack Productions; Apple Studios

Original release
- Network: Apple TV+
- Release: February 3 – March 24, 2023

Dear Edward is an American drama television series developed by Jason Katims, based on the novel of the same name by Ann Napolitano. It premiered on February 3, 2023 on Apple TV+. In April 2023, the series was canceled after one season.

The novel was partially inspired by the crash of Afriqiyah Airways Flight 771 on May 12, 2010, which resulted in the deaths of all 103 passengers and crew except a 9-year-old boy.

== Premise ==
Young Edward Adler is the lone survivor of a plane crash that takes the lives of his family. He and others affected by the tragedy connect with one another to cope with their respective losses and pain.

== Cast ==
=== Main ===
- Taylor Schilling as Lacey Curtis, Edward’s aunt who becomes his guardian when her sister dies in a plane crash.
- Colin O'Brien as Edward Adler, the sole survivor of a plane crash.
- Anna Uzele as Adriana Washington, the granddaughter of a New York representative who died in the plane crash
- Idris DeBrand as Kojo, a Ghanaian whose sister died in the plane crash and comes to America to get his niece.
- Carter Hudson as John Curtis, Lacey's husband and co-guardian of Edward.
- Maxwell Jenkins as Jordan Adler, Edward's brother who died in the plane crash, who had a secret girlfriend.
- Amy Forsyth as Linda, whose boyfriend died in the crash. She is pregnant.
- Audrey Corsa as Zoe, Dee Dee's daughter whose dad died in the crash
- Eva Ariel Binder as Shay, Lacey and John's next-door neighbor who befriends Edward.
- Brittany S. Hall as Amanda
- Khloe Bruno as Becks
- Connie Britton as Dee Dee, the rich woman whose husband died in the plane crash and had a secret second life.
- Jenna Qureshi as Mahira
- Dario Ladani Sanchez as Sam
- Douglas M. Griffin as Milo
- Ivan Shaw as Steve, whose estranged brother died in the plane crash and becomes close with his brother's fiancée.
- Ashley De La Rosa as Sienna

=== Recurring ===
- Robin Tunney as Jane Adler, Edward's mother who died in the plane crash.
- Brian d'Arcy James as Bruce Adler, Edward's father who died in the plane crash.
- Clara Wong as Daphne

== Episodes ==
| No. | Title | Directed by | Teleplay by | Original release date |
|---|---|---|---|---|
| 1 | "Pilot" | Fisher Stevens | Jason Katims | February 3, 2023 |
Several people head to the airport to board a flight to Los Angeles. Among them is a scriptwriter relocating there with her husband and two sons, Jordan and Edward, who are both homeschooled by their father. Also travelling is an elderly congresswoman on her way to a convention; her granddaughter and secretary, Adriana, sees her off at the airport. Other passengers include Chale, an aspiring actress from Ghana travelling to an audition, and a businessman flying first class on the day of his wife Dee Dee’s and daughter Zoe’s joint birthday. Meanwhile, Dee Dee and Zoe are out celebrating. During the flight, the plane encounters severe turbulence and both engines fail. The pilot attempts an emergency landing, but the aircraft crashes in a forest clearing. Emergency crews arrive at the scene and discover Edward alive among the wreckage as the sole survivor.
| 2 | "Food" | Allison Liddi-Brown | Jason Katims | February 3, 2023 |
The families of the passengers aboard the doomed flight receive news of the crash. A support group is set up for grieving relatives and friends. Dee Dee attends the meetings, where she meets Linda, whose boyfriend died in the crash. Linda confides that she is four months pregnant. Also attending the sessions are Lacey, Edward’s aunt, and Adriana, the congresswoman’s granddaughter. Kojo, Chale’s brother, flies in from Ghana to take care of his motherless niece, Becks. Misunderstanding the purpose of the support group, he initially asks for bureaucratic support instead. Adriana befriends Kojo and Becks and uses her connections to help them. Edward moves in with his maternal aunt Lacey and her husband, John. Lacey struggles to care for Edward, who refuses to eat her “healthy” food and constantly imagines that his deceased brother is still alive. He finds comfort in their neighbour, Shay. Meanwhile, Dee Dee meets with her late husband’s accountant and learns that her husband had lost his job some time earlier, leaving her in significant debt. The accountant advises her to "unload" unnecessary assets, including a condominium in Los Angeles whose existence she had been unaware of.
| 3 | "Stuff" | Allison Liddi-Brown | Megan Chan Meinero; Story by : Halley Feiffer and Rajiv Joseph | February 3, 2023 |
In search of the “mystery girl” who had given him a shrunken head, Edward's new friend Shay convinces him to venture into Manhattan. However, the search proves unsuccessful, and Edward becomes emotionally overwhelmed when revisiting places connected to his past, including his and his brother’s favorite falafel stand. Meanwhile, Adriana struggles to collect enough signatures to get on the ballot and confides in Kojo, who offers to help. In return, Adriana offers to put up Kojo and his niece, Becks, at her apartment. Meanwhile in LA, a friendship begins to develop between Linda and Dee Dee. Linda meets her late boyfriend’s parents, who were unaware of her existence, and tells them that she is pregnant. Dee Dee visits her late husband’s condominium and uncovers further secrets from his past. She confronts a woman she believes to be his lover, only to discover that the woman runs an LGBTQ+ center where her husband volunteered.
| 4 | "Chrysalis" | David Boyd | Rajiv Joseph | February 10, 2023 |
Edward begins attending school but struggles to fit in. In Los Angeles, Dee Dee continues investigating her late husband's secret life and discovers that he had been helping vulnerable teenagers. Meanwhile, Kojo and Becks continue staying with Adriana as they prepare for Chale's funeral. Adriana arranges a more suitable venue for the service. Lacey and John grapple with a large volume of letters addressed to Edward, which they hide from him. Lacey also tries to help Edward process his grief by telling him a story about his mother's generosity when they were young.
| 5 | "Haunted" | David Boyd | Romi Barta | February 17, 2023 |
Lacey is concerned that Edward is becoming too dependent on Shay and doesn't spend enough time on his own. John travels to the crash site in Colorado and sends Edward photographs from the site. Meanwhile, the families of the other victims continue dealing with changing relationships. Amanda receives her engagement ring, which brings back painful memories of her argument with Brent shortly before the crash, and grows closer to his brother, Steve. Adriana's political campaign progresses, as do her feelings for Kojo, and she impresses the audience during a debate. Dee Dee continues to deal with revelations about her late husband, while Zoe tells her that she wants to drop out of college and travel. When Linda asks Dee Dee to accompany her to an ultrasound, Dee Dee initially refuses but eventually changes her mind. With Shay's help, Edward tracks down the mysterious girl who has been trying to contact him. She does not explain her connection to Jordan but gives Edward an orange with a note suggesting that the mystery surrounding Jordan is far from over.
| 6 | "Truth" | Jaffar Mahmood | LaDarian Smith | February 24, 2023 |
Edward and Shay meet Mahira, Jordan’s girlfriend. Captivated by meeting someone who knew his brother, Edward unintentionally hurting Shay. When Mahira asks about the day of the crash, the traumatized Edward claims he remembers nothing. Meanwhile, Lacey invites Linda to stay with them and gives her the baby supplies stored in the garage. One night, Linda shows Edward a photograph of her late fiancé, Gary. Edward remembers Gary smiling at him in the plane aisle, which brings Linda comfort. The next day, he calls Mahira and tells her what he remembers. Elsewhere, Dee Dee comforts Steve, who confides in her about the situation with Amanda, his late brother's fiancé. Adriana and Kojo become lovers, Sam is drawn to Vernon, and John returns from Colorado shaken, receiving little sympathy from an exhausted Lacey.
| 7 | "Folklore" | Jaffar Mahmood | Louisa Hill | March 3, 2023 |
Edward becomes increasingly interested in Mahira, and they text frequently, a fact he hides from Shay. When Mahira sends him her old selfie, he crops Jordan out and then lies about it. Shay's father, Xavier, returns to town and moves in with Shay and her mother, despite their divorce. He disapproves of Shay's roller derby hobby and encourages her to play golf instead because of the college scholarships available to female players. Although Shay passes the tryout, she decides not to join the team. Edward blames Xavier, and the two have an argument. Adriana and Kojo take Becks camping in the mountains. Meanwhile, Adriana's campaign suffers a setback when her old speech about affordable housing resurfaces attracting negative publicity. Around the campfire, Kojo tells a fairy tale about the Queen of New York, who must choose between her old life and following her heart. Steve, acting now as Dee Dee's financial adviser, urges her to cut expenses, including selling the house where she raised Zoe. Dee Dee struggles to accept their financial situation and tell Zoe, further straining their relationship. At a garage sale organised by the grief group, members sell their deceased loved ones' belongings to raise money for charity. Sam is unsettled when Vernon shows up and quickly sends him away before his wife becomes suspicious. After John's account of his visit to the crash site upsets Dee Dee, Lacey tells him off for thinking only of himself. Later that night, John announces that he is moving out.
| 8 | "Music" | Clement Virgo | Michelle Lirtzman | March 10, 2023 |
| 9 | "Paper Covers Rock" | Clement Virgo | Rajiv Joseph | March 17, 2023 |
| 10 | "Shelter" | Nisha Ganatra | Jason Katims | March 24, 2023 |

== Production ==
It was announced in February 2022 that Apple TV+ had given a ten episode greenlight for the series, which Jason Katims developed from Ann Napolitano's novel. Colin O'Brien was cast in the title role, with Connie Britton and Taylor Schilling also announced to star. Fisher Stevens was set to serve as director for the pilot episode. Additional casting was announced in March 2022 as production began in New York City, with filming taking place at Central Park. In April, Brian d'Arcy James was cast for a recurring role. On April 19, 2023, it was reported that the series was canceled after one season.

== Release ==
Dear Edward was released on February 3, 2023, with the first three episodes available immediately and the rest debuting on a weekly basis.

== Reception ==
The review aggregator website Rotten Tomatoes reported a 57% approval rating with an average rating of 6/10, based on 30 critic reviews. The website's critics consensus reads, "Sincerely acted and occasionally quite moving, Dear Edward nevertheless bears the signature of overdetermined schmaltz that's too intent on wringing tears." Metacritic, which uses a weighted average, assigned a score of 61 out of 100 based on 16 critics, indicating "generally favorable reviews".
