= Hello Beautiful (novel) =

2023 novel by Ann Napolitano

- Author: Ann Napolitano
- Genre: Literary fiction Historical fiction Drama
- Publisher: The Dial Press
- Publication date: 2023

Hello Beautiful is a 2023 historical fiction novel and the fourth book by American writer Ann Napolitano. It is a drama about the four sisters in an Italian Catholic family in Chicago; two sisters fall in love with the same man, causing the family to split apart for 25 years. Hello Beautiful was published on March 14, 2024, by The Dial Press. It was Oprah Winfrey's 100th book club selection.

== Plot ==
Julia, Sylvie, Cecelia, and Emeline Padavano are close and have different personalities. Julia is the ambitious eldest with a no-nonsense demeanor. Sylvie is a hopeless romantic who kisses boys in the library. Cecelia and Emeline are twins, one an artist and the other a nurturer. They are close with their parents, Rose and Charlie.

Julia meets William Waters at Northwestern University. When he was six days old, his older sister Caroline died of a fever and cough and was found dead in her crib. His parents were unable to move past the loss of Caroline, causing William to grow up with emotionally neglectful parents. William earns a basketball scholarship to Northwestern University and moves to Chicago. Julia and William begin dating and she introduces him to her family. William shatters his knee during a basketball game and is no longer able to play, triggering a depression he hides from Julia.

Cecelia tells her family that she is pregnant and will raise the child as a single teenage mother. Rose cannot accept this due to her religion and past as a teenage mother and kicks her out. Attempting to bring the family back together, Julia decides to get pregnant. She and William marry and have their daughter, Alice.

Charlie visits Cecelia and her newborn daughter Izzy in the hospital after she gives birth, he dies of a heart attack just after leaving. Rose sells the house and moves to Florida, refusing to acknowledge Izzy's existence. Emeline comes out as gay and begins dating a woman named Josie.

While those events unfold, Julia fails to see the growing divide between her and William as he hides his progressive depression. Sylvie notices William's mental health decline and organizes the search to find him after Julia tells her that William left her. He is pulled out of Lake Michigan and spends time in the hospital. In the aftermath, Sylvie visits him in the hospital and they fall in love.

Julia and Alice move to New York City after William and Julia divorce. He relinquishes custody of Alice out of fear that he cannot raise her due to his mental health issues. Julia raises Alice as a single mother in New York while building a successful career. When Alice is five, Julia tells her that her father died in a car accident.

Julia and Sylvie do not speak for 25 years after Julia finds out that Sylvie and William fell in love. Cecelia, Emeline, and Josie live together in a duplex in Chicago and raise Izzy together. Cecelia pursues a career as an artist. Emeline marries Josie who she met at her job at a daycare. Sylvie works as a librarian and William becomes a physical therapist at Northwestern University and eventually for the Chicago Bulls.

Julia maintains contact with her mother Rose in Florida and occasionally exchanges postcards with Cecelia and Emeline. However, she feels betrayed by her sisters' acceptance of William and Sylvie's relationship.

Sylvie is diagnosed with a terminal brain tumor when she is 47 years old. Julia returns to Chicago twice to reunite with Sylvie in secret. Sylvie dies suddenly one day after collapsing in her kitchen. Julia reveals the truth to Alice.

Julia and Alice reunite with the rest of the family during Sylvie's funeral.

== Background ==
Hello Beautiful is preceded by Dear Edward (2020). It is the writer’s fourth book, and was inspired by Louisa May Alcott's Little Women. In the novel each of the Padavano sisters compares themselves to the March sisters, the eldest both claim to be "the feisty Jo, and they were both right." Napolitano wrote the novel during the pandemic and after her father died, she said she "was grateful to find some comfort, and even glimmers of hope, inside the fictional world that became Hello Beautiful". She also said the emotional notes mimicked that of her last novel Dear Edward, which were "kindness, grief, our deep human need for connection." The father in the novel, Charlie Padavano, was influenced by Napolitano's grief in her father's death. Napolitano said in an interview with NPR that the Padavano sisters were inspired by her fascination with the five sisters of her best friend's mother, "they had slightly different versions of the same face, and they seemed more themselves when they're in the same room together than they did when they were separated."

== Critical reception ==
Bruce Holsinger of the New York Times said that Napolitano "resists the easy satisfactions of the sentimental and never settles for simple answers to emotional predicaments faced by her characters. Oprah Winfrey selected Hello Beautiful as her 100th pick for Oprah's Book Club 2.0. In her review, she said "I'm telling you... once you start you won't want it to end... and be prepared for tears." Diane Cole of The Washington Post described the book as "a tender tearjerker... this one chronicles life's highs and lows with precision."
