= Dear Edward =

2020 American novel

- First edition (US)
- Author: Ann Napolitano
- Language: English
- Genre: Fiction
- Publisher: The Dial Press (US); Viking Press (UK)
- Publication date: January 6, 2020
- Publication place: United States
- Media type: Print (Hardcover & Paperback)
- Pages: 352 pages
- ISBN: 978-1984854780

Dear Edward is a 2020 novel by American writer Ann Napolitano. It tells the story of a 12-year-old boy who is the sole survivor of a plane crash that kills all of the other 191 passengers, including the protagonist's family. Dear Edward was published on January 6, 2020, by The Dial Press. It was Napolitano's third novel. A TV series of the same name aired in 2023.

== Writing and inspiration ==
The novel was partially inspired by the crash of Afriqiyah Airways Flight 771 on May 12, 2010, which resulted in the deaths of all 103 passengers and crew except a 9-year-old boy. Napolitano said of the real-life crash: "This story just flayed me. I could not imagine how the boy would be OK, and I could feel from the stickiness of my obsession that I was going to have to write a book that created a set of circumstances to make him OK."

== Critical reception ==
Angie Kim of The New York Times called it a "suspenseful page-turner" and a "haunting novel that's a masterful study in suspense, grief and survival". Elisabeth Egan, also of The New York Times, called it "a surprisingly uplifting story, full of hope and dry humor, with an underlying, noncloying message about the decency of strangers". NPR book reviewer Heller McAlpin called it "a sure-footed tearjerker" and "in part a tale of survivor guilt, which is fueled by the weight of oppressive, often bizarre expectations on the miracle boy". Jenna Bush Hager, the co-host of Today with Hoda & Jenna and daughter of former U.S. President George W. Bush, selected Dear Edward as the January 2020 selection of her Read With Jenna book club. Stephanie Larratt of Today wrote: "While the story has tragedy at its core, it is a book about shared humanity, new beginnings and finding hope through even the most trying experience."

The book made The New York Times Best Sellers list on January 26, 2020, debuting at #2 in the "Hardcover Fiction" category and #3 in the "Combined Print & E-Book Fiction" category.

== TV series adaptation ==
In February 2022, Apple TV+ ordered a television series adaptation of the novel. The series consists of 10 episodes, produced by Apple Studios with Jason Katims as showrunner. It stars Connie Britton, Taylor Schilling, and Colin O’Brien as Edward. The cast also includes Amy Forsyth as Linda, Carter Hudson as John, Eva Ariel Binder as Shay, Maxwell Jenkins as Jordan, Jenna Qureshi as Mahira, Brittany S. Hall as Amanda, Audrey Corsa as Zoe, Anna Uzele as Adrianna, Ivan Shaw as Steve, Idris Debrand as Kojo, and Dario Ladani Sanchez as Sam.

Fisher Stevens directed the first episode. On April 19, 2023, it was reported that the series was canceled after one season of 10 episodes.
