= Maxwell Jenkins =

American actor (born 2005)

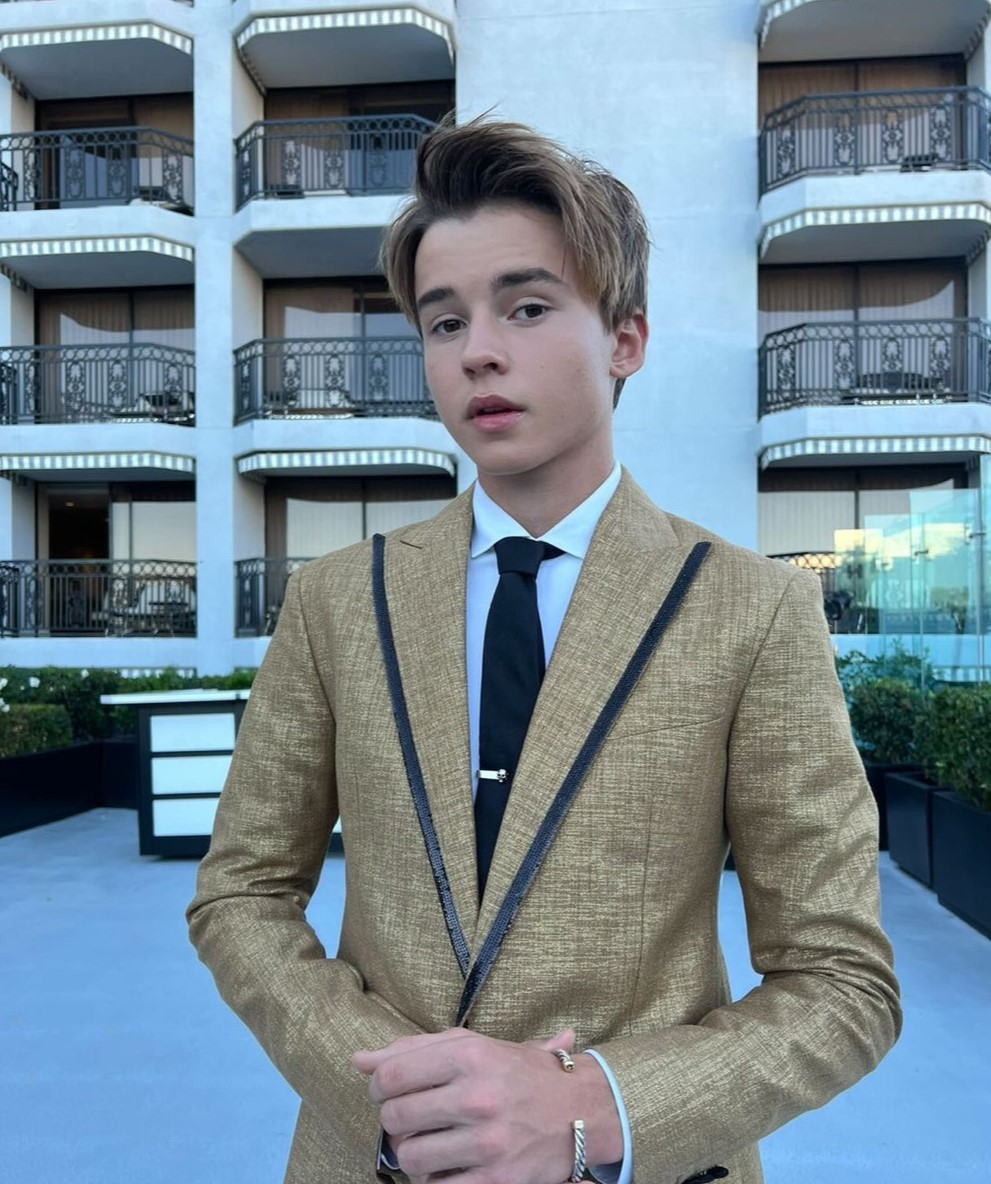
- Jenkins in 2021
- Born: May 3, 2005 (age 21); Chicago, Illinois, U.S.
- Education: University of California, Los Angeles
- Occupation: Actor
- Years active: 2013–present

Maxwell Jenkins (born May 3, 2005) is an American actor who is known for his roles in Lost in Space, A Family Man, Sense8, Dear Edward, and Arcadian. In 2020, he played the role of Joseph Bell in the true story of Joe Bell. In 2021, he was cast as the young Jack Reacher in the Amazon Prime television series Reacher.

== Early life and education ==
Jenkins is the son of Jeff Jenkins, a former Ringling clown, and Julie Greenberg, a film and theatre actress. They are the co-founders and directors of the Chicago-based Midnight Circus, whose proceeds help fund general improvements for the Chicago parks the circus is hosted in. Jenkins began performing with the circus at age three, and has performed acts including rola-bola, acrobatics, tightwire walking, juggling, and playing mandolin.

Jenkins was educated at Lane Tech College Prep High School, a selective magnet high school, in the Roscoe Village area of Northeast side Chicago, Illinois.

Jenkins now attends the University of California, Los Angeles. He plans to major in Global Studies, with a minor in Film and Media Studies.

== Career ==
Jenkins started his acting career in ABC's Betrayal at age eight in 2013. He would then go on to have recurring roles in several series including Sense8, directed by the Wachowski sisters, and Chicago Fire, where he portrayed the character of J.J. Holloway. In 2016, Jenkins was cast as Will Robinson in Lost in Space, a Netflix remake of the 1965 television series. His performance has been nominated for several Young Artist and Saturn Awards. In 2021, Jenkins was cast as a young Jack Reacher in the Amazon series Reacher based on the novel series by Lee Child.

Jenkins' work also includes several feature films. In 2016, he starred in A Family Man, which premiered at TIFF. In it, he portrayed a young boy whose new illness forces his father to reevaluate his priorities and search for a way to reconnect with his family. In 2020, he also starred in the film Joe Bell. His role as Jadin Bell's younger brother was praised, with one critic noting his scenes to be among the film's most powerful.

Jenkins is also an avid musician, playing mandolin, guitar, bass guitar, violin, and drums. His band, Cowboy Jesus and the Sugar Bums, received a Chicago Music Award.

== Personal life ==
Alongside his professional successes, Jenkins has continued to perform in his family's non-profit circus show, Midnight Circus in the Parks. Through this, performers have raised over $1 million for Chicago park renovations, community projects, and overseas disaster relief. Jenkins has also been a spokesman for the ASPCA, where he often advocates for better education, legislation, and protection for canine breeds. He has also helped raise awareness and funds for the conservation group Oceana.

In response to the NCAI efforts to remove Native American caricatures as sports mascots, Jenkins led a petition to change the stereotypical Indian symbol used by his own high school. Speaking at his Local School Council, he argued that the symbol did not show respect to native peoples and that there was a historical precedent for the school to change its policies to align with modern progress, just as it had when it changed its enrolment policy to accept female students. It was soon announced that the school would remove its Indian symbol as a mascot.

In 2020, Jenkins was honored for his various charity and community contributions when he was presented with a Community Leadership Award by the Young Artist Academy.

Starting from the 2024–2025 season, he is a cheerleader for UCLA.

== Filmography ==
=== Film ===
Year	Title	Role	Notes
2015	Consumed	Tommy	
2016	Popstar: Never Stop Never Stopping	Young Owen Bouchard	
2016	A Family Man	Ryan Jensen	
2020	Joe Bell	Joseph Bell	
2024	This Too Shall Pass	Simon	
2024	Arcadian	Thomas	

=== Television ===
Year	Title	Role	Notes
2013–2014	Betrayal	Oliver	Recurring role
2015	Sense8	Young Will Gorski	Recurring role
2015	NCIS: New Orleans	Ryan Griggs	Episode: "I Do"
2015	Chicago Fire	J.J.	2 episodes
2018–2021	Lost in Space	Will Robinson	Main role
2021	Chicago Med	EJ Daniels	Episode: "A Square Peg in a Round Hole"
2022	Reacher	Young Jack Reacher	Recurring role
2023	Dear Edward	Jordan	Main role
2025	The Bondsman	Cade Halloran	Main role
2027	Scooby-Doo: Origins	Fred Jones	Main role

== Awards and nominations ==
Award	Year (Note: Indicates year ceremony was held. Where available, year is linked to the article for the specific ceremony.)	Category	Nominated work	Result	Ref.
Saturn Awards	2019	Best Supporting Actor in Streaming Presentation	Lost in Space	Nominated	
Saturn Awards	2021	Best Performance by a Younger Actor in a Television Series	Lost in Space	Nominated	
Saturn Awards	2022	Best Performance by a Younger Actor in a Streaming Television Series	Lost in Space	Nominated	
Young Artist Awards	2019	Best Performance in a Streaming Series or Film: Young Actor	Lost in Space	Nominated	
Young Artist Awards	2020	Community Leadership Award	—	Won	
