= We Summon the Darkness =

2019 film by Marc Meyers

- Official release poster
- Directed by: Marc Meyers
- Written by: Alan Trezza
- Produced by: Mark Lane; Robert Jones; James Harris; Kyle Tekiela; Jarod Einsohn; Christian Armogida; Alexandra Daddario; Thomas E. van Dell
- Starring: Alexandra Daddario; Keean Johnson; Maddie Hasson; Amy Forsyth; Logan Miller; Austin Swift; Johnny Knoxville
- Cinematography: Tarin Anderson
- Edited by: Joe Murphy; Jamie Kirkpatrick
- Music by: Timothy Williams
- Production companies: The Fyzz Facility; Nightshade Entertainment; Common Enemy
- Distributed by: Saban Films
- Release dates: February 28, 2019 (Mammoth Film Festival); April 10, 2020 (United States)
- Running time: 91 minutes
- Country: United States
- Language: English
- Box office: $190,760

We Summon the Darkness is a 2019 American horror thriller film directed by Marc Meyers and written by Alan Trezza. The film stars Alexandra Daddario, Keean Johnson, Maddie Hasson, Amy Forsyth, Logan Miller, Austin Swift, and Johnny Knoxville.

The film premiered at Mammoth Film Festival on February 28, 2019, and was released in digital and on-demand in the United States on April 10, 2020, by Saban Films.

== Plot ==
In Indiana, July 1988, Alexis Butler and her two friends Val and Bev are driving to a heavy metal show, when a milkshake is thrown from a blue van onto their windshield. Once they arrive at the concert, they find the same blue van, and Val throws a small firecracker into it, causing the three boys inside to climb out. Ivan owns the van and his buddies Kovacs and Mark, who is said to be leaving for Los Angeles soon, are interested in the girls. After the show, Alexis invites the boys to her father's empty mansion. Bev and Mark seem to like each other, yet Bev seems to almost avoid him. As they play a game of Never Have I Ever, the girls drug the boys' drinks and reveal they are going to murder them and make it look like a Satanic cult killing.

The Daughters of the Dawn, the church the girls are a part of, has murdered eighteen other people in the same way in order to create fear and send more people to their religion. Alexis is shown to be the most insane and stabs Ivan after he criticizes her religious belief in Christ, and he bleeds to death. Mark and Kovacs briefly escape, hiding in a pantry. Susan, Alexis's soon-to-be ex-stepmother, comes home to retrieve a passport and reveals she has called the police because she saw the strange blue van and the house lights on. Susan then discovers Ivan's body and Alexis stabs her to death.

A police officer arrives and becomes suspicious, so Alexis runs from him and back into the house where he chases her. The officer finds the injured Kovacs and Mark who pleads for help, but Val sneaks up on him, takes his gun, and shoots him, killing him. As Alexis and Val fight over the gun, Bev appears, threatening her friends with an electric outboard trolling motor. Val and Alexis tell Bev they are doing the Lord's work, but Bev declares she will let Mark and Kovacs go.

Bev tries to help Mark and Kovacs, the latter who is bleeding out and will not last much longer unless he makes it to a hospital. Alexis has the car keys, so Mark goes after her; he obtains the keys, but Alexis attacks him and they fight. Val attacks Bev and tries to kill her, but Bev lights Val on fire (her hair being full of hairspray). Meanwhile, Kovacs sees car lights and struggles outside to find John Henry Butler, Alexis's father and the pastor of the Daughters of the Dawn. John Henry shoots Kovacs, who makes it back into the house where Bev finds him. Just before Kovacs dies, he tells Bev to save Mark.

While strangling Alexis, Mark is shot by John Henry, who then berates his daughter, Alexis, for doing a terrible job murdering and covering it up. He tells her that they have to make some sacrifices to get out of the predicament she has caused and attempts to strangle her to death when Bev comes up and knocks him out. A crazed Alexis grapples with Bev but trips on Mark’s outstretched arm and falls out the window. Mark is still alive, and he drives away with Bev, only to find Alexis standing in the road. Off-camera, Bev runs Alexis over.

John Henry Butler is still alive and makes himself into a victim, claiming that his daughter, Alexis, was led astray and joined a Satanic cult. Bev and Mark leave town together.

== Cast ==
- Alexandra Daddario as Alexis Butler
- Keean Johnson as Mark
- Maddie Hasson as Val
- Amy Forsyth as Beverly
- Logan Miller as Kovacs
- Austin Swift as Ivan
- Johnny Knoxville as John Henry Butler
- Allison McAtee as Susan
- Tanner Beard as Sheriff Dembrowski
- Stephanie Moroz as Female Reporter
- Harry Nelken as Crusty Cashier

== Release ==
We Summon the Darkness was released in digital and on-demand on April 10, 2020. It was released on Blu-ray and DVD on June 9, 2020 by Lionsgate Home Entertainment. The film was released on Netflix on August 8, 2020.

== Reception ==
On Rotten Tomatoes, the film has an approval rating of 69% based on 71 reviews, with an average rating of 5.8/10. The site's critics consensus reads: "We Summon the Darkness makes the most of its rather pedestrian plot with palpable affection for genre formula, an appealing cast, and a sharp sense of humor." On Metacritic, the film has a weighted average score of 55 out of 100, based on 14 reviews, indicating "mixed or average reviews".

Owen Gleiberman of Variety magazine wrote: "We Summon the Darkness is a psycho thriller that pulls the bloody rug out from under you, and does it in a shivery sly way."

== Music ==
We Summon the Darkness: Original Motion Picture Soundtrack

Soundtrack album by Timothy Williams
- Released: May 22, 2020
- Genre: Soundtrack
- Length: 39:45
- Label: Lakeshore

On May 22, 2020, Lakeshore Records released the score soundtrack for the film composed by Timothy Williams.

All tracks are written by Timothy Williams.

No.	Title	Length
1.	"We Summon the Darkness"	1:14
2.	"You Bitch"	1:42
3.	"Window Toss"	0:43
4.	"Drugged"	1:33
5.	"When Will the Sun Rise?"	2:18
6.	"Which One for the Knife?"	2:14
7.	"Parents Away"	1:00
8.	"Get Out!"	2:05
9.	"Jaw Breaker"	0:55
10.	"Cop Killer"	2:39
11.	"Kitchen Courage"	2:36
12.	"Flamed"	4:17
13.	"Step Moms Home"	2:42
14.	"It's On"	2:11
15.	"Wanna Have Fun?"	1:15
16.	"Pantry Prisoner"	2:30
17.	"Not My Fault"	0:52
18.	"Naked"	1:23
19.	"Lock Down"	1:06
20.	"Escape Gone Wrong"	1:30
21.	"Motorhead"	1:06
22.	"Don't Believe Everything"	1:54
Total length:		39:45
