= Eva Maria Daniels =

Icelandic film producer (1979–2023)

- Born: 5 July 1979; Reykjavík, Iceland
- Died: 30 June 2023 (aged 43); London, England
- Occupation: Film producer
- Notable work: Hold the Dark; Joe Bell
- Spouse: Moritz Diller

Eva Maria Daniels (5 July 1979 – 30 June 2023) was an Icelandic film producer. She was known for producing Hold the Dark (2018) and Joe Bell (2020). She died of cancer on 30 June 2023 in London, England, at the age of 43.

== Filmography ==
Year	Film	Producer	Executive producer	Notes
2010	The Romantics		Yes	
2012	Goats		Yes	Also post-production supervisor
2012	What Maisie Knew		Yes	
2014	Time Out of Mind		Yes	
2017	The Dinner		Yes	
2018	Hold the Dark	Yes		
2019	End of Sentence		Yes	
2020	Joe Bell	Yes		
2023	Reality		Yes	
