= Julian Black Antelope =

Canadian actor

- Occupations: Actor, broadcaster
- Years active: 2005–present
- Known for: Blackstone
- Spouse: Tracy Walaschuk
- Children: 3

Julian Black Antelope is an Indigenous actor and television broadcaster from Canada. He is most noted for his recurring role as Darrien Tailfeathers in the television drama series Blackstone, for which he received a Canadian Screen Award nomination for Best Performance in a Guest Role in a Drama Series at the 5th Canadian Screen Awards in 2017.

Although Cree and Métis by birth, he was taken from his family in the Sixties Scoop, and raised by a white family in Fort Macleod, Alberta. Because of Fort Macleod's proximity to the Blackfoot peoples, he reconnected with his Indigenous heritage through Blackfoot communities, and was later formally adopted by an elder of the Kainai Nation. He began his career in media after being offered a small role in the 2005 television miniseries Into the West.

His other roles have included supporting or guest appearances in the television series Hell on Wheels, The Flash, Condor, Tribal and NCIS: Origins, and the films Hold the Dark, Prey and The Birds Who Fear Death.

In recent years he has created, produced and hosted two editions of Secret History, an APTN documentary series on First Nations history in Canada. At the 13th Canadian Screen Awards in 2025, he received a nomination for Best Host or Interviewer in a News or Information Program or Series for Secret History: Women Warriors.

He is married to Tracy Walaschuk, with three daughters.
