= Hold the Dark =

- Official poster
- Directed by: Jeremy Saulnier
- Screenplay by: Macon Blair
- Based on: Hold the Dark by William Giraldi
- Produced by: Russell Ackerman; Eva Maria Daniels; Neil Kopp; Anish Savjani; John Schoenfelder
- Starring: Jeffrey Wright; Alexander Skarsgård; James Badge Dale; Riley Keough; Julian Black Antelope; Beckam Crawford
- Cinematography: Magnus Nordenhof Jønck
- Edited by: Julia Bloch
- Music by: Brooke Blair; Will Blair
- Production companies: Addictive Pictures; VisionChaos Productions; FilmScience
- Distributed by: Netflix
- Release dates: September 12, 2018 (TIFF); September 28, 2018 (worldwide)
- Running time: 125 minutes
- Country: United States
- Language: English

Hold the Dark is a 2018 American neo-Western action thriller film directed by Jeremy Saulnier from a screenplay by Macon Blair. It is based upon the novel of the same name by William Giraldi. The film stars Jeffrey Wright, Alexander Skarsgård, James Badge Dale, Riley Keough, Tantoo Cardinal, and Julian Black Antelope. The film had its world premiere at the Toronto International Film Festival on September 12, 2018, and was released on September 28, 2018, by Netflix.

== Plot ==
Russell Core, a writer who studies wolf behavior, is summoned to the village of Keelut, Alaska, by Medora Slone. Medora wants him to hunt down the wolves blamed for the disappearance of three small children, including her 6-year-old son Bailey. Core stays at her house, and unsuccessfully tries to convince her that this is not wolf behavior. Medora tells him that there is darkness there, and tells him of a hot springs to the north of town, which is the only warm place she's ever known. She also says her husband is away fighting in the war, and that he told her he would never leave her. In the middle of the night, Core wakes and sees Medora scrubbing her skin in the bath. When she is finished, she puts on a wolf mask, then removes it, and lies down naked next to Core without saying anything while putting his hand on her neck.

Overseas in Iraq, Medora's husband Vernon returns gunfire on a truck with insurgents. Later, at a city checkpoint, Vernon discovers another American soldier raping a local woman. Vernon wounds the rapist with a knife and hands the bloody weapon to the woman. Leaving her house, he is ambushed and shot by a sniper, but survives. As he is airlifted away, Vernon mumbles Bailey's name.

In the morning, Core sets off to track the wolves, and meets Illanaq, an old native woman who tells him he is going the wrong way, and that Medora "knows evil". Core finds the hot springs Medora mentioned in a cave, and spots a pack of wolves eating their young. Unwilling to shoot them, Core returns to Keelut. At the Slone house, he finds Medora missing and discovers Bailey's frozen, strangled body in the cellar. The police investigate, and native villagers claim Medora is possessed by a wolf-demon called a tournaq.

Cheeon, father to another missing child, meets Vernon at the airport and takes his friend to the morgue to identify Bailey's body. They meet police chief Donald Marium, Core, and other police officers. After Core and Marium leave, Vernon kills the officers and the coroner and takes Bailey's body. Cheeon builds a coffin and Vernon buries his son in the snow after marking the coffin with his blood.

After Vernon reads and burns the case file, he visits Illanaq. She tells him the wolves had come before and claims no responsibility for what happened. She recalls how influenza once spread through the village and took the lives of many, with the wolves tearing apart their bodies.

Discovering the officers and coroner murdered and Bailey's body missing, Marium realizes Vernon is responsible and mobilizes his men. Remembering the old woman's warning, Core returns to Keelut only to find Illanaq dead in her home. He steps outside as several police vehicles arrive in pursuit of Vernon and Cheeon.

After the officers take up position around Cheeon's house and Marium offers him an opportunity to surrender, Cheeon opens fire with a machine gun. A shootout ensues, with many officers wounded and killed, before Marium can sneak into the house and kill Cheeon.

At an inn outside a tourist mine where Medora was sighted, Vernon meets John, an elderly hunter who treated a younger Vernon with wolf-oil at his father's request. At John's invitation, Vernon takes a mask from the wall, dons it, and kills the old man. The innkeeper shoots Vernon in the shoulder as he is returning to his truck. He visits Shan, an old friend, to treat his wound. Waking up from a dream of himself and Medora in the hot springs, Vernon overhears Shan talking to the police and kills him.

Core and Marium theorize that Medora went to the springs and resolve to find her before Vernon does. Core and Marium fly out in a small bush plane and search the terrain north of Keelut. After spotting the springs and landing nearby, they hike into the forest where Vernon kills Marium with an arrow through the neck. Core races to the springs, and warns Medora her husband is coming. Vernon enters the cave and shoots Core in the chest with an arrow. Medora pushes the mask off Vernon's face and they embrace as Core falls unconscious.

After Core awakens, Vernon removes the arrow and leaves with Medora. Core crawls outside the cave, encountering a pack of wolves, and is rescued by a father and son. Vernon and Medora dig up Bailey's grave, and pull the coffin behind them as they trek through the snow. Core wakes up in the hospital with his daughter Amy at his bedside.

== Cast ==
- Jeffrey Wright as Russell Core
- Alexander Skarsgård as Vernon Slone
- James Badge Dale as Chief Donald Marium
- Riley Keough as Medora Slone
- Julian Black Antelope as Cheeon
- Macon Blair as Shan
- Tantoo Cardinal as Illanaq
- Peter McRobbie as Trapper John
- Beckham Crawford as Bailey Slone
- Jonathan Whitesell as Arnie
- Bobbi Jaye as Amy Core

== Production ==
In September 2015, it was announced Jeremy Saulnier would direct the film, based upon a screenplay by Macon Blair; while Eva Maria Daniels, Russell Ackerman and John Schoenfelder would produce the film under their VisionChaos Productions banner and Addictive Pictures banners respectively, A24 would distribute the film. In January 2017, Netflix acquired distribution rights to the film, with Anish Savjani and Neil Kopp joining as producers. In February 2017, Alexander Skarsgård, Riley Keough, James Bloor, James Badge Dale and Jeffrey Wright joined the cast of the film.

=== Filming ===
Principal photography began on February 27, 2017, and concluded on April 26, 2017. Filming took place in and around the areas surrounding Calgary, Drumheller and Kananaskis Country, Alberta, which were used to substitute for Alaska.

== Release ==
It had its world premiere at the Toronto International Film Festival on September 12, 2018. It also screened at Fantastic Fest on September 22, 2018. It was released on September 28, 2018.

=== Critical reception ===
Hold the Dark received generally positive reviews from critics. The review aggregator Rotten Tomatoes reported a 69% approval rating based on 83 reviews, with an average score of 6.5/10. The website's critical consensus states, "Hold the Dark's unsettling aesthetic offers more of what filmgoers expect from director Jeremy Saulnier — and is often enough to prop up shaky narrative underpinnings." Metacritic, which uses a weighted average, assigned a score of 63 out of 100 based on 26 critics, indicating "generally favorable" reviews.
