= A Family Man =

- Film poster
- Directed by: Mark Williams
- Written by: Bill Dubuque
- Produced by: Gerard Butler; Nicolas Chartier; Craig J. Flores; Patrick Newall; Alan Siegel; Mark Williams
- Starring: Gerard Butler; Gretchen Mol; Alison Brie; Anupam Kher; Alfred Molina; Willem Dafoe
- Cinematography: Shelly Johnson
- Edited by: Thom Noble
- Music by: Mark Isham
- Production company: Zero Gravity Management
- Distributed by: Vertical Entertainment
- Release dates: September 13, 2016 (TIFF); July 28, 2017 (United States)
- Running time: 108 minutes
- Country: United States
- Language: English
- Box office: $1.6 million

A Family Man (previous title The Headhunter's Calling) is a 2016 American drama film directed by Mark Williams, in his directorial debut, and written by Bill Dubuque. The film tells the story of Dane Jensen, a Corporate Recruiter from Chicago, who must balance his career aspirations and his increasingly complex family life. The film stars Gerard Butler, Willem Dafoe, Maxwell Jenkins, Anupam Kher, Alfred Molina, Alison Brie, and Gretchen Mol. Principal photography began on October 26, 2015 in Toronto. It screened at the 2016 Toronto International Film Festival.

== Plot ==
Dane Jensen is a successful Chicago-based corporate headhunter who works at the Blackridge Recruitment agency. His life revolves around closing deals in a survival-of-the-fittest boiler room.

As the film opens Jensen is shown to be focused on his job, but he also tries to be a family man. His boss Ed Blackridge is offering him a promotion that will lead to him controlling the company. To secure it, he must beat his ambitious rival Lynn Wilson's numbers. Jensen's focus on the job becomes a detriment to his family. His wife Elise asks for more of his time with them.

Jensen tries to spend some quality time with his oldest child Ryan, to prepare him for the adult world. Believing Ryan to be on the verge of childhood obesity, he takes him jogging in the morning. Jensen notices that his son is constantly complaining of fatigue and has bruises he can't explain.

Jensen works harder and spends more time at the office to try to get the promotion, which does not sit right with Elise. She asks him to prioritize. Ryan is later diagnosed with cancer, which shocks them all.

Jensen spends more time with his son, which causes his numbers — a prerequisite of the promotion — to drop. Meanwhile, Lynn takes the opportunity to tap into his clients and scores.

The film culminates with Ryan falling into a coma before getting better, and Jensen losing his job at Ed's firm, due to not turning a profit.

The seemingly strict Ed releases him from his non-compete agreement. Jensen starts his own company working from home and is now invested with his family.

== Cast ==
- Gerard Butler as Dane Jensen, Elise's husband and Lauren and Ryan's father
- Gretchen Mol as Elise Jensen, Dane's wife and Lauren and Ryan's mother
- Alison Brie as Lynn Wilson, Dane's rival
- Anupam Kher as Dr. Savraj Singh
- Dustin Milligan as Sumner Firestone
- Maxwell Jenkins as Ryan Jensen, Dane and Elise's son and Lauren's brother
- Alfred Molina as Lou Wheeler
- Willem Dafoe as Ed Blackridge, Dane's boss
- Julia Butters as Lauren Jensen, Dane and Elise's daughter and Ryan's sister
- Mimi Kuzyk as Bernadine
- Dwayne Murphy as Antoine, Ryan's nurse
- Kathleen Munroe as Toni
- Romaine Waite as Recruiter #2

== Production ==
In November 2012, Bill Dubuque's first script The Headhunter's Calling was revealed. On September 2, 2015, it was announced that Gerard Butler would star in the family drama film The Headhunter's Calling, to be directed by Mark Williams, who would make his debut. Williams and Butler would produce the film along with Alan Siegel, Voltage Pictures would handle the international sales for the film. Nicolas Chartier, Craig Flores, and Patrick Newall would also be producing the film.

Principal photography on the film began on October 26, 2015 in Toronto. Filming began in Chicago on December 13, 2015 and it wrapped up on December 18.

== Release ==
The film was released on July 28, 2017, by Vertical Entertainment.

== Critical response ==
On review aggregator website Rotten Tomatoes, the film has an approval rating of 16% based on 25 reviews, with an average rating of 4.1/10. The site's critical consensus reads, "A Family Man has some worthy ideas, but they're bungled in a middle-of-the-road melodrama populated by thinly sketched -- and occasionally downright unlikeable -- characters." On Metacritic, which assigns a normalized rating to reviews, the film has a weighted average score of 21 out of 100, based on 7 critics, indicating "generally unfavorable" reviews.
