= Amy Forsyth =

Canadian actress (born 1995)

- Born: August 6, 1995 (age 31)
- Occupation: Actress
- Years active: 2010–present

Amy Forsyth (born August 6, 1995) is a Canadian actress. On television, she appeared as a series regular on the Hulu drama The Path (2016–17), the second season of SyFy horror anthology Channel Zero (2017), and the NBC musical drama Rise (2018), along with recurring roles on the science fiction Western Defiance (2014–15) and the historical drama The Gilded Age (2022–present). She appeared in the horror films A Christmas Horror Story (2015), Hell Fest (2018), and We Summon the Darkness (2020) and the drama films Beautiful Boy (2018), CODA (2021), and The Novice (2021).

== Career ==
She started her career in episodic roles in the television shows Cracked, Reign, Degrassi: The Next Generation, The Lizzie Borden Chronicles, and Coyote. She also appeared in the films Beautiful Boy and CODA.

Forsyth made her feature film debut in the 2013 horror film Torment directed by Jordan Barker, in which she played the role of Mary Bronson / Little Monkey, which premiered October 11, 2013.

In 2015, Forsyth played the role of Alice Kelly in the television film The Music in Me. In the same year, she played Caprice Bauer in A Christmas Horror Story starring William Shatner, which was released on October 2, 2015, along with a VOD release. Also the same year, Forsyth worked in two television films: Lead with Your Heart as Lacey Walker and Kingmakers as Julia Hennessey.

In 2016, Forsyth appeared on the first season of the drama series The Path, in which she played the recurring role of Ashley Fields.

In 2017, Forsyth appeared in the second season of the horror anthology series Channel Zero alongside Aisha Dee and Jeff Ward, in which she played the lead role of Margot Sleator.

In 2018, Forsyth was cast to play the lead role of Gwen Strickland in the musical drama series Rise starring Josh Radnor. In the same year, Forsyth played the lead role of Natalie in the slasher film Hell Fest alongside Reign Edwards, Bex Taylor-Klaus, and Tony Todd, which was released on September 28, 2018, by CBS Films and Lionsgate.

In 2019, Forsyth played the role of Beverly in the horror thriller film We Summon the Darkness directed by Marc Meyers and written by Alan Trezza, which was premiered at Mammoth Film Festival on February 28, 2019, and released on April 10, 2020, by Saban Films.

Forsyth co-starred Isabelle Fuhrman in the 2021 psychological sports drama film The Novice directed by Lauren Hadaway, where she played the role of Jamie Brill.

Forsyth played the recurring role of Carrie Astor in the historical drama series The Gilded Age.

In 2023, Forsyth was cast to play the main role of Linda in the drama series Dear Edward, based on Ann Napolitano's 2020 novel of the same name.

In 2024, Forsyth joined the Broadway cast of the Tony Award-winning Stereophonic as Diana.

== Filmography ==
=== Film ===
Year	Title	Role	Notes
2013	Torment	Mary Bronson / Little Monkey	
2015	A Christmas Horror Story	Caprice Bauer	
2018	Beautiful Boy	Diane	
2018	Hell Fest	Natalie	
2019	We Summon the Darkness	Beverly / Bev	
2021	CODA	Gertie	
2021	The Novice	Jamie Brill	
2024	Shook	Claire	
2024	Inedia	Cora	
2025	Plainclothes	Emily	

=== Television ===
Year	Title	Role	Notes
2013	Cracked	Julia Grieveson	Episode: "Faces"
2014	Reign	Isobel Derant	Episode: "Sacrifice"
2014	Degrassi: The Next Generation	Eden	Episode: "Everything is Everything"
2014–2015	Defiance	Andina	Recurring
2015	The Music in Me	Alice Kelly	Television film
2015	The Lizzie Borden Chronicles	Penelope Trotwood	Episode: "Capsize"
2015	Lead with Your Heart	Lacey Walker	Television film
2015	Kingmakers	Julia Hennessey	Unaired television pilot
2016–2017	The Path	Ashley Fields	Main role (season 1); guest role (season 2)
2017	Channel Zero: The No-End House	Margot Sleator	Main role
2018	Robot Chicken	Dorothy Ann / Romaine	Voice role; episode: "We Don't See Much of That in 1940s America"
2018	Rise	Gwen Strickland	Main role
2022	Coyote	Kate Clemens	4 episodes
2022–2025	The Gilded Age	Carrie Astor	Recurring role (seasons 1–3)
2023	Dear Edward	Linda	Main role
TBA	The Magnificent Seven	Katie “Deadeye” Dalton	Main role

=== Stage ===
Year	Title	Role	Venue	Notes
2024	Stereophonic	Diana	Broadway, John Golden Theatre	
