= Joe Bell (film) =

2020 film

- Theatrical release poster
- Directed by: Reinaldo Marcus Green
- Written by: Diana Ossana; Larry McMurtry
- Produced by: Cary Joji Fukunaga; Riva Marker; Daniela Taplin Lundberg; Eva Maria Daniels; Ryan Ahrens; Mark Wahlberg; Stephen Levinson
- Starring: Mark Wahlberg; Reid Miller; Connie Britton; Maxwell Jenkins; Gary Sinise; Igby Rigney; Morgan Lily
- Cinematography: Jacques Jouffret
- Edited by: Mark Sanger
- Music by: Antonio Pinto
- Production companies: Endeavor Content; Argent Pictures; Rhea Films; Hercules Film Fund; Stay Gold Features; Nine Stories Productions; Vision Chaos; Parliament of Owls; Closest to the Hole; Leverage Entertainment
- Distributed by: Roadside Attractions
- Release dates: September 14, 2020 (TIFF); July 23, 2021 (United States)
- Running time: 94 minutes
- Country: United States
- Language: English
- Box office: $1.7 million

Joe Bell is a 2020 American biographical drama road film directed by Reinaldo Marcus Green, from a screenplay by Larry McMurtry and Diana Ossana. The film stars Mark Wahlberg, Reid Miller, and Connie Britton, and follows the true story of a man named Joe Bell, who sets out walking across America to speak out against bullying and honoring his teenage son, Jadin Bell, who died by suicide after he was bullied for being gay. The film was produced by Jake Gyllenhaal’s production company, Nine Stories Productions, with Gyllenhaal serving as executive producer.

The film had its world premiere under its original title Good Joe Bell at the 2020 Toronto International Film Festival on September 14, 2020, and was released in the United States on July 23, 2021, by Roadside Attractions. The film received mixed reviews from critics, who were divided on whether it was feel-good and inspirational or reductive and contrived.

== Plot ==
In May 2013, Oregon mill worker Joe Bell is walking through Idaho with his 15-year-old son, Jadin. Nine months prior, Jadin revealed to his parents that he is being bullied at school because he is gay. Joe is accepting although still often uncomfortable; he supports Jadin when he joins the cheerleading squad but asks him to practice in the back yard, worried that their neighbors will pass judgement.

Along the way, they stop at a diner where the news on TV mentions same-sex marriage. When two patrons make a disparaging remark, Joe tells them about his mission – to walk across America in order to raise awareness against homophobic bullying – before leaving hastily. Jadin tells his dad that men like that won't change and that bullying starts with their children, who need to be educated properly about its effects.

Back in 2012, Jadin attends a Halloween party and meets a gay teenager named Chance; they share a kiss and begin secretly dating. At a school football game, Jadin is heckled by several people in the crowd for being a cheerleader and his parents get up and leave in embarrassment. Later, he is bullied on social media, but is comforted by his younger brother, Joseph. Chance then ends their relationship, scared that his parents will find out. Back on the road, Joe tells Jadin he was supportive of his cheerleading despite never showing it, and the two reenact Jadin's old routine in the rain after they set up camp for the night.

Joe and Jadin arrive in Salt Lake City, Utah. They check into a motel and Joe goes to a gay bar, where he engages with some locals and tells them his son's story. When asked why he didn't bring him, Joe tells them that his son is dead. Joe has been walking alone the whole time; Jadin's presence was all in his mind.

Jadin's mom, Lola, and Joseph visit Joe on the road. Lola shows Joe a note that was left on Jadin's grave, an apology written by one of the boys who had bullied him. Joe reacts angrily and takes it out on Joseph, leaving both him and Lola upset and fearful. When Joe is later spotted by some locals (after having seen him on TV giving speeches at various events) and takes photographs with them, Lola questions if he is walking for Jadin or for the fame. Back home, Lola calls Joe and tells him she found an essay Jadin had written detailing his experiences of bullying and expressing his desire to commit suicide.

Back in February 2013, Jadin is assaulted in the school locker room by a group of jocks. Joe and Lola meet with the school principal who advises Jadin transfers schools or attends therapy. Jadin tearfully refuses, claiming he is not the one who needs help. The bullying continues, particularly on social media. One morning, Lola finds a suicide note in Jadin's bedroom as a jogger discovers Jadin's body, having hanged himself in a nearby park. Lola rushes to the scene to find Jadin has already died. Days later, Joe, who has spiraled into a deep depression, gets into his car with a gun, but Joseph stops him. Joe then decides to walk from Idaho to New York City, where Jadin always wanted to live.

Joe calls Lola from the road and tells her he cannot walk any further, but she convinces him to keep going for Jadin. Days later, a local sheriff, Gary, stops Joe as he walks the side of the highway. He buys Joe a hot meal and they talk; Gary reveals his son, William, is also gay. He tells Joe that he has never considered that William has ever wanted to take his own life. Joe urges him to tell William that it is okay to be who he is, something he never told Jadin and regrets, knowing he will have to live with that for the rest of his life.

Joe continues walking and sees Jadin again. Joe apologizes and tells Jadin that he always loved him; Jadin says he knows. Joe then calls Lola and apologizes to her also, and thanks her for putting up with him. He promises to be better about staying in touch on the road.

In October 2013, Gary receives a call about a traffic accident in Colorado and arrives at the scene where a semi-truck driver had fallen asleep and hit a pedestrian on the shoulder of the US 40, killing him instantly. The victim is revealed to be Joe.

The film ends with Joe and Jadin meeting in a field, walking together towards the sunlight. As the credits roll, images and videos of the real Bell family are shown.

== Cast ==
- Mark Wahlberg as Joe Bell, Jadin's father
- Reid Miller as Jadin Bell, Joe and Lola's son and Joseph's older brother
- Connie Britton as Lola Bell, Jadin's mother
- Maxwell Jenkins as Joseph Bell, Jadin's young brother
- Gary Sinise as Sheriff Gary Westin (based on Sheriff Tom Nestor)
- Blaine Maye as Boyd Banks
- Ash Santos as Kim
- Igby Rigney as Chance Davidson, Jadin's boyfriend
- Morgan Lily as Marcie
- Scout Smith as Colleen
- Cassie Beck as Mrs. Swift
- Charles Halford as Will
- Tara Buck as Mary Ivy

== Production ==
In April 2015, it was announced Cary Joji Fukunaga would direct a film about Joe and Jadin Bell, from a screenplay by Larry McMurtry and Diana Ossana. Fukunaga would produce the film, while Daniela Taplin Lundberg, Riva Marker and Eva Maria Daniels would produce the film under their VisionChaos Productions and Parliament of Owls banners, respectively. A24 would produce and distribute the film.

In April 2019, Mark Wahlberg, Reid Miller, Connie Britton, Maxwell Jenkins and Gary Sinise joined the cast of the film, which had been titled Good Joe Bell. Reinaldo Marcus Green would direct, replacing Fukunaga who was still attached as a producer, with Wahlberg, Jake Gyllenhaal and Stephen Levinson also producing, and A24 no longer distributing and producing. Principal photography began on April 15, 2019, in Salt Lake and Summit County, Utah, and ended May 24, 2019.

== Release ==
Under the title Good Joe Bell, the film had its world premiere at the 2020 Toronto International Film Festival on September 14, 2020. Shortly after, Solstice Studios acquired distribution rights to the film for $20 million, shortened the title to Joe Bell, and scheduled it for a February 19, 2021 release. In January 2021, it was reported that the film would not be released that date, with Solstice planning to release it later that year. In May 2021, it was announced that Roadside Attractions acquired distribution rights to the film from Solstice and set it for a July 23, 2021 release, with Vertical Entertainment set to distribute the film digitally following its theatrical release.

== Reception ==
=== Box office ===
The film grossed $674,000 from 1,094 theaters in its opening weekend, finishing 11th at the box office.

=== Critical response ===
On review aggregator Rotten Tomatoes, the film holds an approval rating of 40% based on 127 reviews, with an average rating of 5.5/10. The website's critics consensus reads: "Good Joe Bell's heartfelt message - and Reid Miller's stirring breakout performance - are unfortunately undermined by formulaic storytelling." On Metacritic, it has a weighted average score of 54 out of 100, based on 26 critics, indicating "mixed or average" reviews. Audiences surveyed by PostTrak gave the film a 79% positive score, with 57% saying they would definitely recommend it.

Giving it a "C", The A.V. Club's A. A. Dowd stated "The film has its heart in the right place, but its head is foggy and possibly concussed; it seems uncertain how to reshape its ripped-from-the-headlines story into satisfying drama." Steve Pond of TheWrap called the film "An open-hearted, unapologetically emotional story of a man struggling to come to terms with what happened to his son and with his own complicity in it" and said "[t]here are shocks along the way, handled gently or dropped as a gut punch".

Peter Debruge of Variety was more critical, calling the film a "didactic anti-bullying melodrama that feels more akin to old-school TV movies" and saying that "[a] movie like this would be a good start, if this were 1980. A decade and a half after Brokeback Mountain, however, it feels like a huge step backward."
