= The Magnificent Seven (upcoming TV series) =

Upcoming American television series

- Genre: Western
- Created by: Tim Kring
- Based on: The Magnificent Seven by William Roberts (Note: The Magnificent Seven (1960) is an American remake of the Japanese film Seven Samurai (1954) which was written by Akira Kurosawa, Shinobu Hashimoto and Hideo Oguni)
- Starring: Matt Dillon; Will Patton; Michael Ealy; Danny Pino; Joanne Froggatt; Amy Forsyth; Joshua Close; Ken Yamamura; Michael Rubenfeld; Joel Nankervis
- Country of origin: United States
- Original language: English

Production
- Executive producers: Tim Kring; Donald De Line; Lawrence Mirisch; Bruce Kaufman; Matt Dillon; M. Raven Metzner; Tony Gayton
- Production companies: Tailwind Productions; De Line Pictures; MGM Television Studios; MGM+ Studios

Original release
- Network: MGM+

The Magnificent Seven is an upcoming American Western television series created by Tim Kring for MGM+. It is a remake of the 1960 film.

== Cast ==
- Matt Dillon as Chris Adams
- Will Patton as Cyrus T. Clemons
- Michael Ealy as Vin Tanner
- Danny Pino as Santiago "Santi" Vega
- Joanne Froggatt as Harriet Talbot
- Amy Forsyth as Katie "Deadeye" Dalton
- Joshua Close as Skelton
- Ken Yamamura as Kenjiro "Kenji"
- Michael Rubenfeld as Eli "Wick" Kagan
- Joel Nankervis as Jebidah "Jeb" Campbell

== Production ==
=== Development ===
In February 2023, Amazon Studios made a series commitment for a new Western that was being developed by Nic Pizzolatto as a new original for Amazon Prime Video. By April 2023, Pizzolatto had been re-working his original series idea into an adaptation of The Magnificent Seven, as Amazon sought to capitalize on its acquisition of MGM. Amazon decided not to move forward with Pizzolatto's work, and instead greenlit a series from Tim Kring to release on MGM+.

=== Casting ===
In February 2026, Matt Dillon was cast in the lead role of Chris Adams. In May 2026, Will Patton and Michael Ealy were cast as Cyrus T. Clemons and Vin Tanner, respectively. In June 2026, Danny Pino, Joanne Froggatt, and Amy Forsyth were cast as Santiago "Santi" Vega, Harriet Talbot, and Katie "Deadeye" Dalton, respectively. In July 2026, Joshua Close, Ken Yamamura, Michael Rubenfeld and Joel Nankervis were cast as Skelton, Kenjiro "Kenji", Eli "Wick" Kagan and Jebidah "Jeb" Campbell respectively.

=== Filming ===
The series began production in Calgary on June 1, 2026, and was expected to end on September 22.
