= Mr. Harrigan's Phone =

2022 film by John Lee Hancock

- Promotional release poster
- Directed by: John Lee Hancock
- Written by: John Lee Hancock
- Based on: Mr. Harrigan's Phone by Stephen King
- Produced by: Ryan Murphy; Jason Blum; Carla Hacken
- Starring: Donald Sutherland; Jaeden Martell; Joe Tippett; Kirby Howell-Baptiste
- Cinematography: John Schwartzman
- Edited by: Robert Frazen
- Music by: Javier Navarrete
- Production companies: Blumhouse Television; Ryan Murphy Productions
- Distributed by: Netflix
- Release date: October 5, 2022
- Running time: 106 minutes
- Country: United States
- Language: English

Mr. Harrigan's Phone is a 2022 American supernatural coming-of-age horror film written and directed by John Lee Hancock. It is based on the novella of the same name by Stephen King from the collection If It Bleeds. The film stars Donald Sutherland, Jaeden Martell, Joe Tippett and Kirby Howell-Baptiste. It follows Craig, who has a strong friendship with retired businessman John Harrigan; both get their first iPhones after the former wins a lottery. Despite the latter's death, a supernatural connection persists between them through their phones, one of which is buried alongside Harrigan.

Mr Harrigan's Phone was released on October 5, 2022, by Netflix. The film received mixed reviews from critics.

== Plot ==
In 2003, young Craig Poole becomes acquainted with retired businessman John Harrigan following the death of his mother, Joanna, with instructions simply to read to him three times a week. Five years later a teenage Craig and elderly Harrigan have become friends. During this time Craig starts high school and becomes close to Ms. Hart, a teacher who comes to his aid when Kenny Yankovich, a school bully, attempts to intimidate him. After winning $3,000 from a lottery ticket that Harrigan gave him and receiving his first iPhone for Christmas, Craig buys one for Harrigan too. Despite initial resistance to new technology, he enjoys the phone.

The elderly Harrigan dies, leaving Craig heartbroken at the loss of his friend. At the funeral Craig sneaks Harrigan's phone into the coffin, later being informed by Harrigan's associate that he was left a bequest in Harrigan's will. Craig will receive $800,000 in a trust fund to support his future studies and pursuit of a writing career, which he had told Harrigan about. Craig calls Harrigan's phone as a gesture of thanks. The next morning he discovers that Harrigan sent him an odd text message, though his father chalks it up to being a bug within the iPhone itself.

Life goes on for Craig, who goes to a dance with his crush, only to be attacked by Kenny, who accuses him of ratting out his drug-dealing activities on school grounds, getting him expelled. Later that night Craig calls Harrigan's phone in a fit of frustration and sadness; he tells him what Kenny did and he is "afraid that this won't end, and I wish that you were here just to give me some advice." Kenny is found dead the next day, having apparently fallen from his bedroom window while attempting to sneak out (though in the novella he asphyxiates himself). Scared by what happened, Craig goes to an Apple store, upgrades his phone to a newer model and puts away his old one.

Craig graduates from high school and departs for college in Boston to study journalism. While there, his father calls to tell him Ms. Hart has been killed in a car accident involving a drunk driver, leaving her fiancé hospitalized. The driver, Dean Whitmore, is sent to rehab instead of prison for the accident although he'd been caught for drunk driving on other occasions, his license was suspended and he had an open container. Infuriated by the verdict, Craig returns to his room and uses his old phone to call Harrigan, explicitly wishing death on Whitmore. Craig later learns Whitmore has been found dead in his shower. He drives to the rehab center and bribes a worker there to give him details about the suicide. He is told that Whitmore swallowed shampoo and a piece of broken soap bar. Craig is disturbed to learn that the soap is the same brand as used by Ms. Hart, and Whitmore's suicide note is actually a lyric from the song "Stand by Your Man" by Tammy Wynette; Harrigan's ringtone.

Craig breaks down and returns to his home town. While there he remembers opening Harrigan's "secret closet" (which he had refused to let Craig enter) after he died, that it was actually a shrine to his deceased mother. He visits his gravestone, apologizing for his messages. He theorizes that Harrigan's odd text messages to him are his way of begging Craig to let his spirit rest in peace and for him to move forward in the here and now. As he leaves Harrigan's grave, Craig visits his mother's and collapses in tears, begging for forgiveness. He then rushes to the town quarry, contemplating the water while standing very near the edge before throwing his old phone into the water but finds himself unable to do the same with his new phone. As Craig walks away, he quietly narrates that when he himself dies and is buried he wants his pockets to be empty.

== Cast ==
- Donald Sutherland as John Harrigan
- Jaeden Martell as Craig Poole
  - Colin O'Brien as young Craig
- Joe Tippett as Mr Poole, Craig's father
- Chelsea Kurtz as Joanna Poole, Mr Poole's late wife and Craig's late mother
- Kirby Howell-Baptiste as Ms. Hart
- Cyrus Arnold as Kenny Yankovich
- Thomas Francis Murphy as Pete Bostwick
- Peggy J. Scott as Edna Grogan
- Thalia Torio as Regina
- Alexa Shae Niziak as Margie Marie

== Production ==
In July 2020, Netflix acquired the film rights to "Mr. Harrigan's Phone", to be produced by Blumhouse Productions and Ryan Murphy with John Lee Hancock set to write and direct the film. In October 2021, Donald Sutherland, Jaeden Martell, Kirby Howell-Baptiste, and Joe Tippett joined the cast. Principal photography started in Connecticut on October 20, 2021, and wrapped on December 22, 2021.

== Release ==
The film was released to streaming on October 5, 2022, by Netflix.

=== Critical reception ===
On the review aggregator website Rotten Tomatoes, 46% of 63 critics' reviews are positive. The website's consensus reads: "Despite a pair of layered performances from its talented leads, Mr. Harrigan's Phone never quite connects with the source material's intriguing themes." Metacritic, which uses a weighted average, assigned the film a score of 55 out of 100, based on 15 critics, indicating "mixed or average" reviews.

In Common Sense Media, Brian Costello gave it a rating of four out of five, saying that "viewers might expect a horror-thriller, but this is more of a coming-of-age story about the perils of revenge and a reflection on how we've changed since the arrival of the smartphone." In The Hollywood Reporter, Frank Scheck said that "unfortunately, despite its intriguing premise, Mr. Harrigan's Phone lacks the necessary ingredient to make it truly memorable; it simply isn't very scary."

In the Arizona Republic, Bill Goodykoontz gave it four out of five, saying that "as with the greatest King stories, the best parts here are not the horror elements (of which there are few). It's the time spent with the characters."

Writing in The Guardian, Benjamin Lee also gave the film two out of five stars, calling it "...a competently made yet utterly inconsequential pre-Halloween time-waster." On IGN, Ryan Leston said, "there are no jump scares, no dream sequences, no monsters, no gore, or anything remotely resembling a hefty-enough scare to warrant calling this a horror film."
