= Colin O'Brien (actor) =

American actor (born 2008)

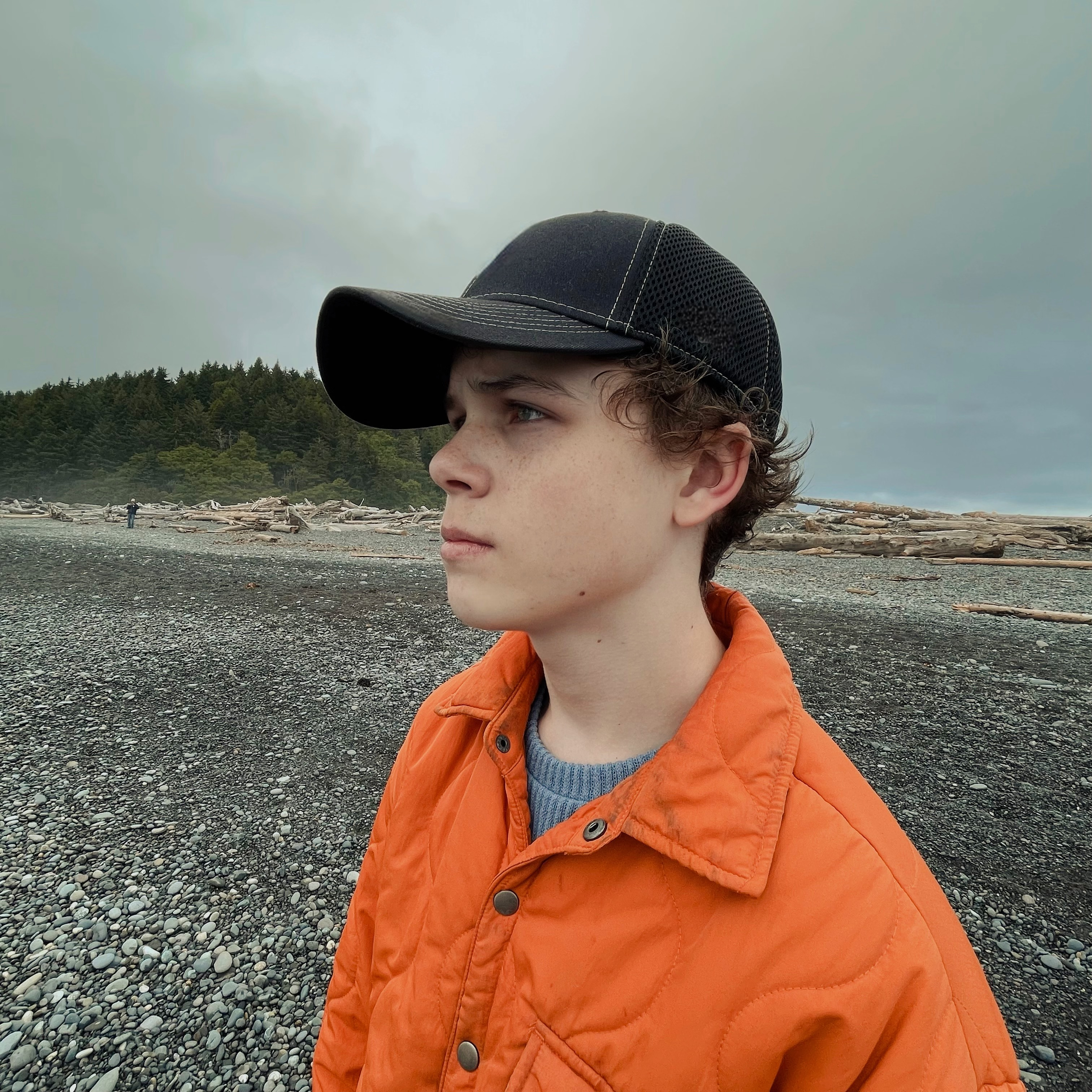
- O'Brien in 2024
- Born: Colin Delaine O'Brien; October 15, 2008 (age 18); The Woodlands, Texas, U.S.
- Occupation: Actor
- Years active: 2019–present

Colin O'Brien (born October 15, 2008) is an American actor. O'Brien's breakout role was as the lead character in the Apple TV+ television series Dear Edward. His performance as Edward earned him a Young Artist Award nomination for Best Performance in a Streaming Series: Leading Youth Artist.

== Career ==
Colin O'Brien started performing at the age of five in musical theater. In 2021, he landed his first role in a major production, The Mothership, starring Halle Berry. O'Brien's career began to accelerate when he was cast as a young Timothée Chalamet in Wonka, where he played Willy Wonka as a child, alongside Sally Hawkins as Mrs. Wonka. O'Brien's next big role had him acting with Donald Sutherland, in Mr. Harrigan's Phone, where O'Brien played a younger version of Jaeden Martell's character Craig Poole.

O'Brien then landed his first starring role, as Edward Adler in the Apple TV+ series, Dear Edward, also starring Connie Britton and Taylor Schilling. The series' creator, writer, and executive producer, Jason Katims, said of O'Brien, "Finding Colin was just the key to everything ... It was like when I worked with ... Claire Danes ...[b]ecause she had such maturity from a very early age as an actress. I felt similarly with Colin."

O'Brien began his work on network TV by guest starring as Matthew Kay, the son of Deacon Kay (played by Jay Harrington), in the 2017 series of S.W.A.T. He also guest starred in a double episode of Grey's Anatomy, as Grayson Friedman. His most recent role has him starring alongside Theo James, playing James' character Hal Shelburn's son Petey Shelburn in the 2025 film The Monkey, written and directed by Osgood Perkins.

=== Critical reception ===
O'Brien's performance in Dear Edward earned him numerous plaudits from critics and a Young Artist Award nomination for Best Performance in a Streaming Series: Leading Youth Artist.

Time magazine described O'Brien as a "luminous newcomer". Richard Roeper of Ebert and Roeper stated, "Young Colin O'Brien is tasked with doing some heavy lifting as Edward, and he does fine work." The Hollywood Reporter declared, "O'Brien is thoroughly committed to Edward's grief ... making his bursts or even glimpses of emotion radiate." Variety magazine noted, "O'Brien renders well the character's humanity, his confusion, his guilt and desire for a moment's break from pain." Roger Ebert.com added its praise, "O'Brien's wounded, withdrawn performance offers the most complete, multifaceted journey among the sprawling ensemble that surrounds him." The Boston Globe stated, "[A]s Edward, young Colin O'Brien is easy to feel for, never working to stir our compassion or pity. He's a natural."

== Filmography ==
=== Film ===
Year	Title	Role	Notes
2021	The Mothership	Martin	Unreleased
2021	Under the Sun	Antonio	Short film
2022	Mr. Harrigan's Phone	Young Craig Poole	
2023	Wonka	Young Willy Wonka	
2025	The Monkey	Petey Shelburn	Principal role

=== Television ===
Year	Title	Role	Notes
2023	Dear Edward	Edward Adler	Main role (10 episodes)
2023	Grey's Anatomy	Grayson Friedman	2 episodes
2023	S.W.A.T.	Matthew Kay	1 episode

=== Commercials ===
Year	Title	Role	Notes
2020	Sambucol:For Centuries	Egyptian Fanbearer / Renaissance Boy / Market Hawker / Butterfly Catcher	Principal role
