= Ann Napolitano =

American writer

- Born: October 21, 1971 (age 54)
- Education: Connecticut College; New York University (MFA)
- Occupation: Author
- Spouse: Dan Wilde
- Children: 2
- Writing career
- Notable works: Dear Edward, Hello Beautiful

Ann Napolitano (born October 21, 1971) is an American novelist and writer. She is the author of four novels, including Dear Edward and Hello Beautiful.

== Early life ==
She was born October 21, 1971 to James and Catherine Napolitano.

She received her MFA from New York University, after graduating from Connecticut College.

She has a sister, a brother and a half sister.

== Teacher, editor ==
She taught fiction writing at Brooklyn College, New York University, and Gotham Writers Workshop.

She was an associate editor of One Story from 2014 to 2020.

== Works ==
- Within Arm's Reach. 2004. ISBN 978-1-4000-5188-5.
- A Good Hard Look. Penguin Press HC. 2011. ISBN 978-1-59420-292-6.
- Dear Edward. Dial Press. January 6, 2020. ISBN 978-1-9848-5478-0.
- Hello Beautiful. Dial Press. March 14, 2023. ISBN 978-0-593-24373-2.

== Personal life ==
Ann Napolitano lives in Park Slope, a neighborhood in Brooklyn, New York with her husband Dan Wilde and their two sons, Malachy and Hendrix.
