= Suicide of Jadin Bell =

Suicide of a bullied gay teenager

Jadin Bell
- Bell c. 2012
- Born: Jadin Robert Joseph Bell; June 4, 1997; La Grande, Oregon, U.S.
- Died: February 3, 2013 (aged 15); OHSU Hospital; Portland, Oregon, U.S.
- Cause of death: Suicide by hanging
- Parent(s): Joe Bell; Lola Lathrop

Jadin Robert Joseph Bell (June 4, 1997 – February 3, 2013) was an American teenager known for his suicide, which raised the national profile of youth bullying and the targeted harassment of gay individuals.

Bell, a 15-year-old gay youth, was intensely bullied both in person and on the internet because he was gay. He was a member of the La Grande High School cheerleading team in La Grande, Oregon, where he was a sophomore. On January 19, 2013, Bell went to Central Elementary, a local elementary school and hanged himself from the play structure. He did not immediately die from the strangulation and was rushed to the emergency department, where he was kept on life support.

The Associated Press reported that a spokesman for the OHSU Hospital in Portland announced that after being taken off life support, Bell died on February 3, 2013.

Bell's death was widely reported in the media, starting discussions about bullying, the effect it has on youth and gay bullying. The Huffington Post, Salon, Oregon Public Broadcasting, The Raw Story, GLAAD, PQ Monthly, PinkNews and many other media outlets reported on Bell's death. The media reported his suicide stemmed from being bullied for being gay, which Bell's father fully believed, stating: "He was hurting so bad. Just the bullying at school. Yeah there were other issues, but ultimately it was all due to the bullying, for not being accepted for being gay."

== Legacy ==
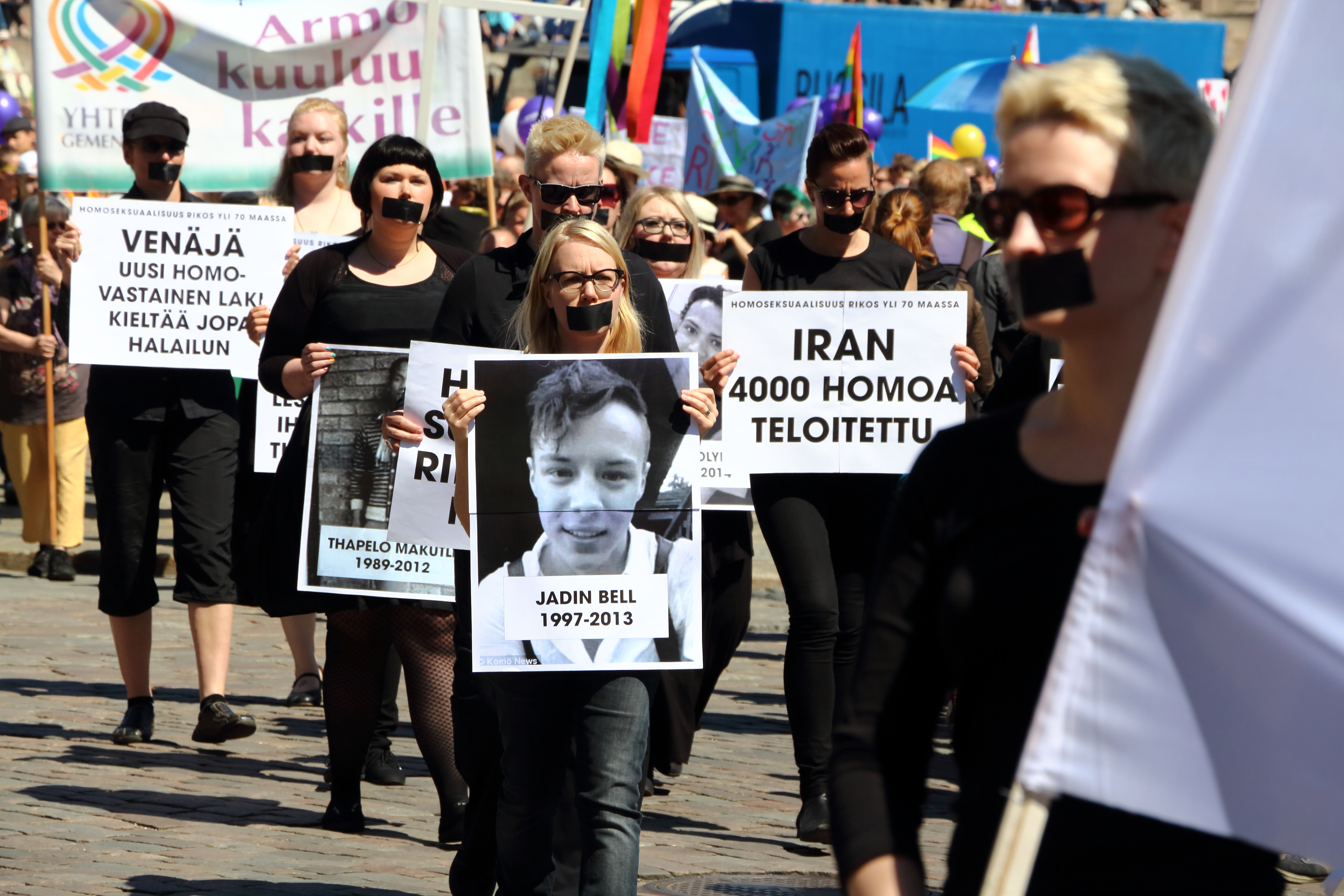
A marcher with Marching for Those Who Can't holding up a sign in memory of Jadin Bell in the 2014 Helsinki Pride

After Bell's death, his father, Joe Bell, planned a cross-country tribute to honor his son. He planned to walk across the entire continental United States within two years, spreading awareness about bullying and the effects that it can have. Bell resigned from his position at Boise Cascade and helped launch Faces for Change, a non-profit anti-bullying foundation, to speak in high schools across the U.S. He stated: "Not doing anything is not acceptable. [Those who watch and do nothing] are just as guilty. They are saying that it is acceptable."

Joe Bell began the walk on April 20, 2013, and was killed halfway through his journey after a semi-truck hit him in Colorado on October 9, 2013. He was pronounced dead at the scene on the shoulder of US 40 when authorities arrived. The driver of the truck, Kenneth Raven, was charged with reckless driving and may have fallen asleep at the wheel. The story was adapted for the 2020 film Joe Bell. Jadin was portrayed by Texan actor Reid Miller.

Faces for Change created a scholarship program in memory of Jadin Bell "to make awards to scholastic institutions on behalf of individuals who have demonstrated a commitment to diversity and the development of community tolerance in our area of service."

== See also ==
- Suicide among LGBTQ people
- List of suicides attributed to bullying
- List of suicides of LGBTQ people
