= My Last Innocent Year =

2023 novel by Daisy Alpert Florin

- Author: Daisy Alpert Florin
- Language: English
- Genre: Literary fiction
- Set in: 1998 New Hampshire
- Publisher: Henry Holt & Company
- Publication date: February 14, 2023
- ISBN: 978-1-250-85703-3

My Last Innocent Year is a 2023 debut coming-of-age novel by Daisy Alpert Florin. It follows two dubiously consensual sexual relationships experienced by an unreliable female narrator in her senior year of college, set during 1998 when the Clinton-Lewinsky scandal took place.

== Process ==
Florin started writing the novel shortly after she had turned 42, in 2015, and finished it nearly a decade later in 2023. She was greatly influenced while writing by current events, like #MeToo, Trump's 2016 election, and Brett Kavanaugh's confirmation. In 2016, while writing My Last Innocent Year, Florin said she thought "oh my gosh, the world is talking to my book" on the similarity between current events and the novel's topic of consent.

== Inspiration ==
The novel is very loosely inspired from Florin's own life. She has said wanted to write a book that embodied looking at one's 20s from a vantage point of 20 years later. Florin herself went to college in the 1990s, influencing her decision to set My Last Innocent Year in that decade, as opposed to the present day. In an interview with the Chicago Review of Books, Florin said that she also wanted to explore how Americans treated famous figures at the time, such as Monica Lewinsky and Britney Spears.

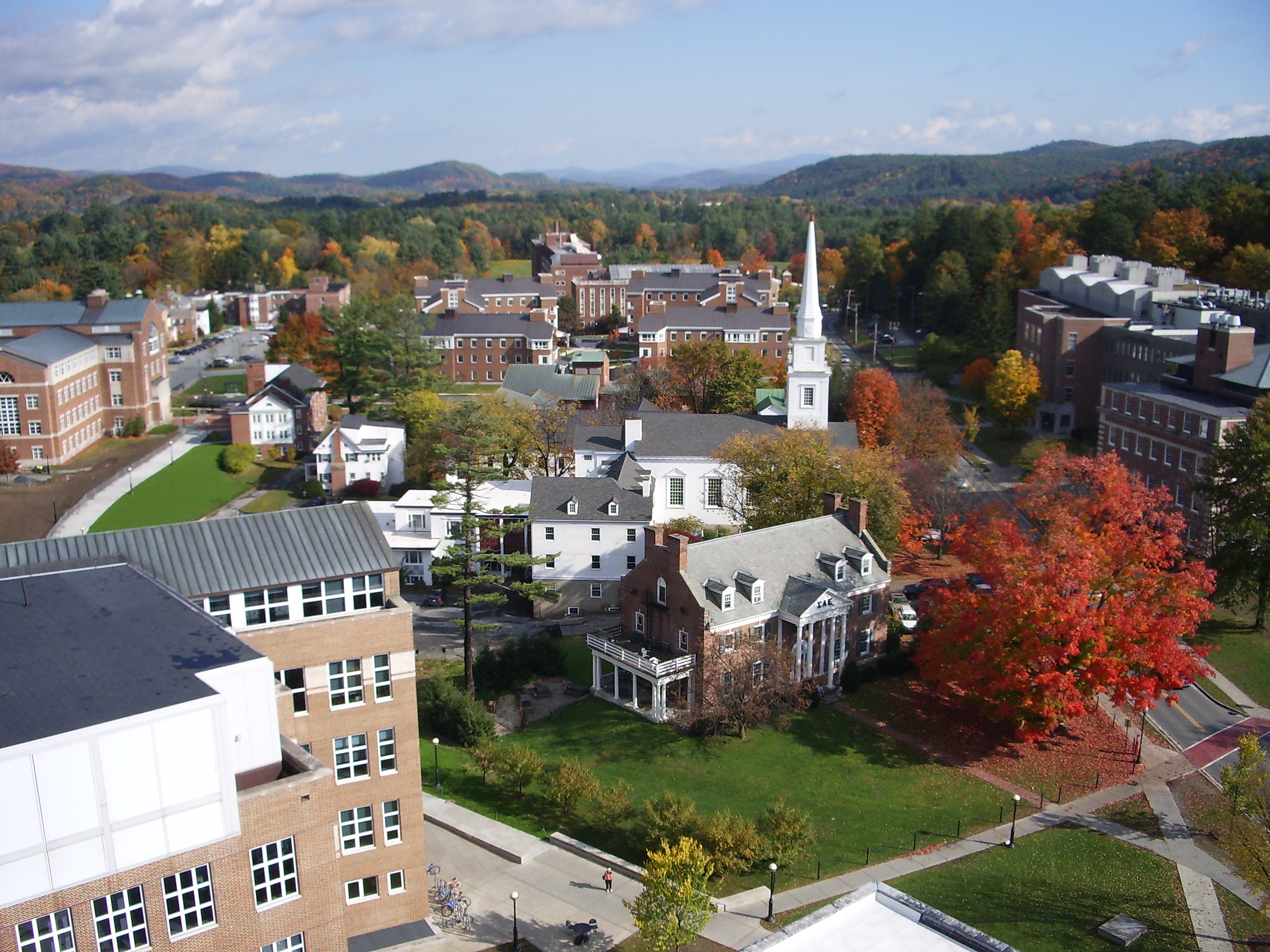
Dartmouth College campus, the inspiration for the setting of My Last Innocent Year

The fictional prestigious Wilder College is supposed to resemble Florin's real alma mater, Dartmouth College. Isabel's own nonconsensual sexual encounter with a male friend was inspired from Florin's own experience with a friend in college.

== Synopsis ==
Isabel Rosen, a student at Wilder College in the 1990s, is a Jewish-American young woman studying English literature. Her mother passed away shortly before college, and her only remaining direct family is a father she calls "Abe." He runs an appetizing store in New York City. They struggle with money, but Abe insists she attends the expensive Wilder College.

Isabel begins her senior year with an uncomfortable sexual encounter with her male Israeli acquaintance, Zev Neman. Her friend Debra insists that this was a sexual assault and they vandalize his dormitory door. That semester, Isabel takes a senior writing seminar, led last-minute by a new professor R.H. Connelly. He compliments her writing often in class, and after an intimate encounter at a dinner party, she begins to have an affair with the older man. Isabel keeps this relationship a secret from everyone: her friends, Abe, and her academic advisor, Tom, who is friends with Connelly.

Tom and Joanna, Isabel's academic mentors and faculty at Wilder College, are going through a divorce. Tom has a public breakdown and appears to be suicidal. Later, Tom kidnaps his and Joanna's daughter and disappears. After speaking with a friend, Isabel begins to suspect that Connelly might know about Tom's whereabouts. After questioning him, she realizes that Tom and his daughter are hiding in Connelly's cabin. Isabel leaves an anonymous tip to the police, and the daughter is safely found, although somewhat hungry, and Tom is found dead nearby in the woods from unknown causes.

Isabel and Connelly's relationship ends and Connelly loses his teaching position. In the present day, Isabel reveals she went on to marry a college boyfriend, Bo, and had a daughter with him. Their marriage was ultimately unsuccessful, and they got divorced. Isabel's writing career saw moderate success, and this reignited a vague and infrequent communication with Connelly, who had sent her a letter of his own writing. Years later, Connelly's wife calls Isabel to let her know that Connelly has passed away.
