= List of songs in Smash =

Smash is an American musical television show that premiered on NBC, Monday, February 6, 2012.

It was announced on June 9, 2011, that NBC had signed a deal with Columbia Records for a soundtrack of the series. The deal gave Columbia worldwide, digital and physical rights to the first season, with options to subsequent seasons. The deal included both original songs written for the series and any covers of songs featured on the show.

By the end of the first season, 36 studio recordings of the show's musical performances were released, 31 of them on iTunes and five with the deluxe edition of the first season soundtrack.

The first season soundtrack, The Music of Smash, was released on May 1, 2012. A deluxe edition, with additional songs, was available exclusively from Target until early 2013.

A second soundtrack album from the show, Bombshell, which serves as the "cast album" for Bombshell, the main show-within-the-show, was released on February 12, 2013, in standard and deluxe versions, the latter again exclusively from Target.

A third soundtrack album, The Music of Smash: The Complete Season 1, was released digitally exclusively by iTunes on May 21, 2013. It consists of 36 songs that had been previously released for Season 1, either as singles or on the previous soundtrack albums, including the deluxe Target edition of The Music of Smash (which is currently out of print).

A fourth soundtrack album, The Music of Smash: The Complete Season 2, was released digitally exclusively by iTunes on May 21, 2013. It consists of 51 songs: 48 from the second season and 3 from the first season - Ivy Lynn's version of "Never Give All the Heart" and demos of "Smash!" and "Second Hand White Baby Grand".

== Performers ==
=== Season 1 ===
Most songs in the first season are performed by the cast of Bombshell, which consistently includes Karen Cartwright (Katharine McPhee) and Ivy Lynn (Megan Hilty), and, at times, Michael Swift (Will Chase) and Rebecca Duvall (Uma Thurman). Other main characters to sing include Tom Levitt (Christian Borle), Dev Sundaram (Raza Jaffrey), Frank Houston (Brian d'Arcy James), Ellis Boyd (Jaime Cepero), and Eileen Rand (Anjelica Huston). Julia Houston (Debra Messing) and Derek Wills (Jack Davenport) have each been featured in choreography. Minor cast members, such as Sam Strickland (Leslie Odom, Jr.), have given performances as well. Various guest stars have appeared in the series, many of them giving vocal performances. These have included Nick Jonas as television star Lyle West, Bernadette Peters as Ivy's mother Leigh Conroy, Annaleigh Ashford as Lisa McMann, and Norbert Leo Butz as himself.

=== Season 2 ===
Many of the same characters from the first season deliver performances in the show's second season, again with Karen Cartwright (Katharine McPhee) and Ivy Lynn (Megan Hilty) being the notable leads. Other vocal performers include Veronica Moore (Jennifer Hudson), Jimmy Collins (Jeremy Jordan), Kyle Bishop (Andy Mientus), Ana Vargas (Krysta Rodriguez), Leigh Conroy (Bernadette Peters), Tom Levitt (Christian Borle), Julia Houston (Debra Messing), Sam Strickland (Leslie Odom, Jr.), Terry Falls (Sean Hayes), Simon as JFK (Julian Ovenden), Daisy Parker (Mara Davi), unnamed actress playing young Marilyn (Sophia Anne Caruso) and ensemble members Bobby (Wesley Taylor) and Jessica (Savannah Wise). Liza Minnelli and Kathie Lee Gifford played themselves in cameos.

== Songs ==
=== Season 1 ===
In the first season, all original songs contain music and lyrics by Marc Shaiman and Scott Wittman, except one where indicated.

List of songs in Smash
Title	Version covered	Composer(s) for originals	Performed by	Episode	Single	Album
"Over the Rainbow"	The Wizard of Oz	—	Karen Cartwright	1. "Pilot"	No	—
"Never Give All the Heart"	Original	Marc Shaiman & Scott Wittman	Ivy Lynn	1. "Pilot"	No	Bombshell (Deluxe version) & Smash: Season 2
"Never Give All the Heart"	Original	Marc Shaiman & Scott Wittman	Karen	10. "Understudy"	Yes	Bombshell & Smash: Season 1
"The National Pastime"	Original	Shaiman & Wittman	Ivy & Audition Dancers	1. "Pilot"; 7. "The Workshop"	Yes	Bombshell & Smash: Season 1
"I Wanna Be Loved by You"	Marilyn Monroe	—	Lisa McMann	1. "Pilot"	No	—
"Beautiful"	Christina Aguilera	—	Karen	1. "Pilot"	Yes	The Music of Smash & Smash: Season 1
"Happy Birthday, Mr. President"	Marilyn Monroe	—	Karen	1. "Pilot"; 5. "Let's Be Bad"	No	—
"Happy Birthday, Mr. President"	Marilyn Monroe	—	Rebecca Duvall	13. "Tech"	No	—
"Let Me Be Your Star"	Original	Shaiman & Wittman	Karen & Ivy	1. "Pilot"; 2. "The Callback"; 7. "The Workshop"	Yes	The Music of Smash, Bombshell (Extended intro version), Smash: Season 1, Smash: Season 2
"Let Me Be Your Star"	Original	Shaiman & Wittman	Ivy	6. "Chemistry"	No	—
"Let Me Be Your Star"	Original	Shaiman & Wittman	Rebecca	11. "The Movie Star"; 14. "Previews"	No	—
"Call Me"	Blondie	—	Karen	2. "The Callback"	Yes	Smash: Season 1
"The 20th Century Fox Mambo"	Original	Shaiman & Wittman	Karen & Bombshell ensemble members	2. "The Callback"; 7. "The Workshop"; 15. "Bombshell"	Yes	The Music of Smash, Bombshell, Smash: Season 1
"The 20th Century Fox Mambo"	Original	Shaiman & Wittman	Ivy & Bombshell ensemble members	4. "The Cost of Art"; 7. "The Workshop"	No	—
"Crazy Dreams"	Carrie Underwood	—	Ivy	2. "The Callback"	Yes	The Music of Smash, Smash: Season 1
"Grenade"	Bruno Mars	—	Michael Swift & the Bruno Mars jukebox musical cast	3. "Enter Mr. DiMaggio"	Yes	Smash: Season 1
"Redneck Woman"	Gretchen Wilson	—	Karen & the karaoke bar patrons	3. "Enter Mr. DiMaggio"	Yes	Smash: Season 1
"Mr. & Mrs. Smith"	Original	Shaiman & Wittman	Ivy & Michael	3. "Enter Mr. DiMaggio"	Yes	The Music of Smash, Bombshell & Smash: Season 1
"Mr. & Mrs. Smith"	Original	Shaiman & Wittman	Rebecca & Michael	14. "Previews"	No	—
"Mr. & Mrs. Smith"	Original	Shaiman & Wittman	Karen & Michael	15. "Bombshell"	No	—
"History is Made at Night"	Original	Shaiman & Wittman	Ivy, Karen & the Bombshell cast	4. "The Cost of Art"	No	—
"History is Made at Night"	Original	Shaiman & Wittman	Ivy, Michael & the Bombshell cast	6. "Chemistry"; 7. "The Workshop"	Yes	The Music of Smash, Bombshell & Smash: Season 1
"History is Made at Night"	Original	Shaiman & Wittman	Ivy & Bobby	13. "Tech"	No	—
"Haven't Met You Yet"	Michael Bublé	—	Lyle West	4. "The Cost of Art"	Yes	The Music of Smash & Smash: Season 1
"I Never Met a Wolf Who Didn't Love to Howl"	Original	Shaiman & Wittman	Ivy, Julia Houston, Ellis Boyd, Michael, Lyle & Lyle's party patrons	4. "The Cost of Art"	Yes	Bombshell & Smash: Season 1
"I Never Met a Wolf Who Didn't Love to Howl"	Original	Shaiman & Wittman	Karen & male ensemble members of Bombshell	15. "Bombshell"	No	—
"Rumour Has It"	Adele	—	Karen, Sue, Jessica, & Bobby	4. "The Cost of Art"	No	—
"Let's Be Bad"	Original	Shaiman & Wittman	Ivy & the Bombshell cast	5. "Let's Be Bad"	Yes	The Music of Smash, Bombshell & Smash: Season 1
"It's a Man's Man's Man's World"	James Brown	—	Karen	5. "Let's Be Bad"	Yes	Smash: Season 1
"A Song for You"	Donny Hathaway	—	Michael	5. "Let's Be Bad"	Yes	Smash: Season 1
"Who You Are"	Jessie J	—	Ivy	6. "Chemistry"	No	The Music of Smash & Smash: Season 1
"Shake It Out"	Florence + the Machine	—	Karen	6. "Chemistry"	No	The Music of Smash & Smash: Season 1
"Brighter Than the Sun"	Colbie Caillat	—	Karen	7. "The Workshop"	No	The Music of Smash & Smash: Season 1
"Everything's Coming Up Roses"	Gypsy	—	Leigh Conroy	7. "The Workshop"	No	The Music of Smash (Deluxe version) & Smash: Season 1
"On Lexington & 52nd Street"	Original	Shaiman & Wittman	Michael	7. "The Workshop"	Yes	Bombshell & Smash: Season 1
"Touch Me"	Original	Ryan Tedder, Brent Kutzle, Bonnie McKee, & Noel Zancanella	Karen	8. "The Coup"	Yes	The Music of Smash & Smash: Season 1
"Three Little Birds"	Bob Marley & the Wailers	—	Frank Houston	8. "The Coup"	No	—
"Dance to the Music"	Sly & the Family Stone	—	Jessica, Dennis, Bobby, Sam Strickland & Ivy	8. "The Coup"	Yes	Smash: Season 1
"The Higher You Get, the Farther the Fall"	Original	Shaiman & Wittman	Norbert Leo Butz & the Heaven on Earth cast	9. "Hell on Earth"	No	—
"Arthur Miller Melody"^{[B]}	Original	Shaiman & Wittman	Frank	9. "Hell on Earth"	No	—
"Cheers (Drink to That)"	Rihanna	—	Karen & Ivy	9. "Hell on Earth"	Yes	Smash: Season 1
"Breakaway"	Kelly Clarkson	—	Ivy	10. "Understudy"	No	The Music of Smash (Deluxe version) & Smash: Season 1
"Don't Say Yes Until I Finish Talking"	Original	Shaiman & Wittman	Tom Levitt & Bombshell male ensemble members	10. "Understudy"	Yes	Bombshell & Smash: Season 1
"Don't Say Yes Until I Finish Talking"	Original	Shaiman & Wittman	Marc Kudisch & Bombshell male ensemble members	14. "Previews"	No	—
"Three On a Match"	Original	Shaiman & Wittman	The Three on a Match high school cast	10. "Understudy"	No	—
"Our Day Will Come"	Ruby & the Romantics	—	Karen	11. "The Movie Star"	No	The Music of Smash (Deluxe version) & Smash: Season 1
"Dig Deep"	Original	Shaiman & Wittman	Rebecca & the Bombshell cast	11. "The Movie Star"	Yes	Smash: Season 1
"Run"	Snow Patrol	—	Karen	12. "Publicity"	No	The Music of Smash (Deluxe version) & Smash: Season 1
"A Thousand and One Nights"	Original	Shaiman & Wittman	Karen, Dev Sundaram & Ensemble	12. "Publicity"	Yes	Smash: Season 1
"Second Hand White Baby Grand"	Original	Shaiman & Wittman	Ivy	12. "Publicity"	Yes	Bombshell & Smash: Season 1
"Second Hand White Baby Grand"	Original	Shaiman & Wittman	Rebecca	14. "Previews"	No	—
"Second Hand White Baby Grand"	Original	Shaiman & Wittman	Demo Vocalist (unnamed)	0. Demo	No	Smash: Season 2
"Another Op'nin', Another Show"	Kiss Me, Kate	—	Tom & Sam	13. "Tech"	No	—
"I'm Going Down"	Rose Royce	—	Ivy	13. "Tech"	Yes	Smash: Season 1
"Smash!"	Original	Shaiman & Wittman	Karen, Ivy, Sue, Jessica & Bombshell female ensemble members	14. "Previews"	Yes	Bombshell & Smash: Season 1
"Smash!"	Original	Shaiman & Wittman	Demo Vocalist (unnamed)	0. Demo	No	Smash: Season 2
"September Song"	Knickerbocker Holiday	—	Eileen Rand	14. "Previews"	No	The Music of Smash (Deluxe version) & Smash: Season 1
"Stand"	Donnie McClurkin	—	Sam, Karen & gospel choir	14. "Previews"	No	The Music of Smash & Smash: Season 1
"Don't Forget Me"	Original	Shaiman & Wittman	Karen	15. "Bombshell"	Yes	Bombshell & Smash: Season 1

=== Season 2 ===
The second season features original music from four different fictional musicals, Bombshell, Beautiful, Hit List and Liaisons, as well as ancillary songs written by the fictional songwriters behind Bombshell and Hit List. All of the songs have music and lyrics by Wittman and Shaiman, except for the songs from Hit List, which for the most part were written by a combination of other musical theater writers and contemporary rock singer-songwriters. The use of additional songwriters was done in part to "open up the sound" of Smash.

List of songs in Smash
Title	Version covered	Composer(s) for originals	Performed by	Episode	Single	Album
"Cut, Print...Moving On"	Original	Marc Shaiman & Scott Wittman	Karen Cartwright	1. "On Broadway"	Yes	Bombshell & Smash: Season 2
"Mama Makes Three"	Original	Shaiman & Wittman	Veronica Moore & the Beautiful cast	1. "On Broadway"	Yes	Smash: Season 2
"Let Me Be Your Star" (Reprise)	Original	Shaiman & Wittman	Karen, Jessica, Beth & Joy	1. "On Broadway"	No	—
"Let Me Be Your Star" (Reprise)	Original	Shaiman & Wittman	Ivy Lynn	8. "The Bells and Whistles"; 11. "The Dress Rehearsal"	No	—
"On Broadway"	The Drifters	—	Karen & Veronica	1. "On Broadway"	Yes	Smash: Season 2
"Don't Dream It's Over"	Crowded House	—	Ivy	1. "On Broadway"	No	Smash: Season 2
"Broadway, Here I Come!"	Original	Joe Iconis	Jimmy Collins	1. "On Broadway"	Yes	Smash: Season 2
"Broadway, Here I Come!"	Original	Joe Iconis	Karen	9. "The Parents"; 13. "The Producers"; 14. "The Phenomenon"	No	—
"Broadway, Here I Come!"	Original	Joe Iconis	Ana Vargas	11. "The Dress Rehearsal"; 13. "The Producers"	No	—
"Broadway, Here I Come!"	Original	Joe Iconis	Karen, Jimmy, Ana, Sam Strickland & Hit List ensemble	17. "The Tonys"	No	Smash: Season 2
"Would I Lie to You"	Eurythmics	—	Karen & Ivy	2. "The Fallout"	No	Smash: Season 2
"They Just Keep Moving the Line"	Original	Shaiman & Wittman	Ivy	2. "The Fallout"	No	Bombshell & Smash: Season 2
"They Just Keep Moving the Line"	Original	Shaiman & Wittman	Karen & Bombshell ensemble members	3. "The Dramaturg"	No	—
"Caught in the Storm"	Original	Pasek & Paul	Karen	2. "The Fallout"	Yes	Smash: Season 2
"Caught in the Storm"	Original	Pasek & Paul	Jimmy	5. "The Read-Through"	No	—
"Good for You"	Original	Drew Gasparini	Karen	3. "The Dramaturg"	Yes	Smash: Season 2
"Soon As I Get Home"	The Wiz	—	Veronica	3. "The Dramaturg"	No	—
"Dancing on My Own"	Robyn	—	Ivy	3. "The Dramaturg"	Yes	Smash: Season 2
"Our Little Secret"	Original	Shaiman & Wittman	Simon & Karen	3. "The Dramaturg"	No	Bombshell & Smash: Season 2
"Our Little Secret"	Original	Shaiman & Wittman	Simon & Ivy	11. "The Dress Rehearsal"	No	—
"I Got Love"	Purlie	—	Veronica	4. "The Song"	Yes	Smash: Season 2
"I'm Not Lost" (partial)	Original	Shaiman & Wittman^{[A]}	Jimmy	4. "The Song"	No	—
"Chest of Broken Hearts" (partial)	Original	Shaiman & Wittman^{[A]}	Karen	4. "The Song"	No	—
"Everybody Loves You Now"	Billy Joel	—	Kyle Bishop & Veronica	4. "The Song"	No	Smash: Season 2
"I Can't Let Go"	Original	Shaiman & Wittman	Veronica, Karen & Ivy	4. "The Song"	Yes	Smash: Season 2
"Public Relations"	Original	Shaiman & Wittman	Karen, Tom Levitt & Bombshell ensemble members	5. "The Read-Through"	No	Bombshell & Smash: Season 2
"Some Boys"	Death Cab for Cutie	—	Karen	5. "The Read-Through	Yes	Smash: Season 2
"This Will Be Our Year"	The Zombies	—	Jimmy, Kyle, Karen & Ana	6. "The Fringe"	Yes	—
"Never Give All the Heart" (Reprise)	Original	Shaiman & Wittman	Karen & Bombshell ensemble members	6. "The Fringe"	No	—
"A Letter From Cecile"	Original	Shaiman & Wittman	Ivy	6. "The Fringe"	Yes	Smash: Season 2
"Heart Shaped Wreckage"	Original	Julian Emery, Jon Green, Jim Irvin & Lucie Silvas	Karen & Jimmy	6. "The Fringe"	Yes	Smash: Season 2
"Heart Shaped Wreckage"	Original	Julian Emery, Jon Green, Jim Irvin & Lucie Silvas	Ana & Jimmy	7. "Musical Chairs"	No	—
"The National Pastime" (Reprise)	Original	Shaiman & Wittman	Karen & Bombshell ensemble members	7. "Musical Chairs"	No	—
"Ce N'Est Pas Ma Faute (It's Not My Fault)"	Original	Shaiman & Wittman	Terrence Falls & Liaisons ensemble members	7. "Musical Chairs"	Yes	Smash: Season 2
"Rewrite This Story"	Original	Pasek & Paul	Karen & Jimmy	7. "Musical Chairs"; 13. "The Producers"	Yes	Smash: Season 2
"Rewrite This Story"	Original	Pasek & Paul	Sam	13. "The Producers"	No	—
"Rewrite This Story"	Original	Pasek & Paul	Karen	16. "The Nominations"	No	—
"(Let's Start) Tomorrow Tonight"	Original	Shaiman & Wittman	Sam, Tom, Bobby, & Jessica	8. "The Bells and Whistles"	No	Bombshell & Smash: Season 2
"I Heard Your Voice In a Dream"	Original	Andrew McMahon	Karen, Jimmy & Hit List ensemble members	8. "The Bells and Whistles	Yes	Smash: Season 2
"If I Were a Boy"	Beyoncé	—	Ana	8. "The Bells and Whistles"	Yes	Smash: Season 2
"Reach for Me"	Original	McMahon	Ana	9. "The Parents"	Yes	Smash: Season 2
"Hang the Moon"	Original	Shaiman & Wittman	Leigh Conroy & Ivy	9. "The Parents"	No	Bombshell & Smash: Season 2
"Original"	Original	Pasek & Paul^{[A]}	Karen	10. "The Surprise Party"	Yes	Smash: Season 2
"A Love Letter From the Times"	Original	Shaiman & Wittman	Tom & Liza Minnelli	10. "The Surprise Party"	Yes	Smash: Season 2
"Bitter Sweet Symphony"	The Verve	—	Ivy	10. "The Surprise Party"	Yes	Smash: Season 2
"Dig Deep" (Reprise)	Original	Shaiman & Wittman	Ivy	11. "The Dress Rehearsal"	No	Bombshell & Smash: Season 2
"Don't Forget Me" (Reprise)	Original	Shaiman & Wittman	Ivy	12. "Opening Night"	Yes	Smash: Season 2
"That's Life"	Frank Sinatra	—	Karen & Ivy	12. "Opening Night"	Yes	Smash: Season 2
"The 20th Century Fox Mambo" (Reprise)	Original	Shaiman & Wittman	Ivy & Kathie Lee Gifford	13. "The Producers"	No	—
"Don't Let Me Know"	Original	Silvas & Jamie Alexander Hartman	Karen & Jimmy	13. "The Producers"	Yes	Smash: Season 2
"The Goodbye Song"	Original	Iconis	Jimmy, Karen, Ana & the Hit List cast	13. "The Producers"	Yes	Smash: Season 2
"The Last Goodbye"	Jeff Buckley	—	Kyle	13. "The Producers"	Yes	Smash: Season 2
"High and Dry"	Radiohead	—	Jimmy	14. "The Phenomenon"	Yes	Smash: Season 2
"Vienna"	Billy Joel	—	Tom	14. "The Phenomenon"	Yes	Smash: Season 2
"At Your Feet"	Original	Shaiman & Wittman	Leigh & young Norma Jeane	14. "The Phenomenon"	No	Bombshell & Smash: Season 2
"The Love I Meant to Say"	Original	Shaiman & Wittman	Jimmy	14. "The Phenomenon"	Yes	Smash: Season 2
"Pretender"	Original	Silvas & Busbee	Karen	15. "The Transfer"	Yes	Smash: Season 2
"Grin and Bare It"	Original	Shaiman & Wittman	Ivy	15. "The Transfer"	Yes	Smash: Season 2
"I'm Not Sorry"	Original	McMahon	Karen & Daisy Parker	15. "The Transfer"	Yes	Smash: Season 2
"The Right Regrets"	Original	Shaiman & Wittman	Julia Houston & Tom	15. "The Transfer"	No	Bombshell & Smash: Season 2
"Feelin' Alright"	Traffic	—	Ivy	16. "The Nominations"	No	Smash: Season 2
"If You Want Me"	Once	—	Ana	16. "The Nominations"	No	—
"Under Pressure"	Queen & David Bowie	—	Ivy, Karen, Jimmy, Ana, Tom, Julia, Eileen Rand, Derek Wills & Sam	17. "The Tonys"	No	Smash: Season 2
"Big Finish"	Original	Shaiman & Wittman	Karen & Ivy	17. "The Tonys	No	Smash: Season 2

== Notes ==
- A From episode credits
- B From the sheet music during the episode

== Digital singles sales ==
Song	Sales
Let Me Be Your Star	48,000
Touch Me	18,000
Beautiful	15,000
That's Life	12,000
I Can't Let Go	11,000
Heart Shaped Wreckage	11,000
I Heard Your Voice in a Dream	10,000
