= Let Me Be Your Star =

2012 Single from the American TV series, Smash

Single by Smash cast feat. Katharine McPhee & Megan Hilty

from the album The Music of Smash, Bombshell
- Released: January 16, 2012
- Recorded: 2012
- Genre: Pop
- Length: 3:12 (Album Version)
- Label: Columbia
- Composer: Marc Shaiman
- Lyricists: Marc Shaiman; Scott Wittman
- Producer: Marc Shaiman

Smash cast singles chronology
| "The National Pastime" (2012) | "Let Me Be Your Star" (2012) | "History Is Made at Night" (2012) |

"Let Me Be Your Star" is an original song introduced in the first episode of the first season of the musical TV series Smash, entitled "Pilot". It was written by Marc Shaiman and Scott Wittman, but in the show's universe, it was written by songwriting duo Tom Levitt (Christian Borle) and Julia Houston (Debra Messing) for the Marilyn Monroe musical they are working on, Bombshell.

In the first episode, the song is performed by characters Karen Cartwright (Katharine McPhee) and Ivy Lynn (Megan Hilty) as they each prepare for and then audition for the role of Marilyn in front the production team.

The song has since been reprised numerous times in various episodes, both as solos and duets. For the first season, it was also sung by Karen and Ivy in the second episode "The Callback" and the seventh episode "The Workshop", by Ivy in the sixth episode "Chemistry", and by Rebecca Duvall (Uma Thurman) in the eleventh episode "The Movie Star" and the fourteenth episode "Previews". In the second season, it was reprised by Karen and several female members of the Bombshell ensemble in the first episode "On Broadway", and by Ivy in the eighth episode "The Bells and Whistles" and the eleventh episode "The Dress Rehearsal".

The song was originally released as a single to digital music retailers and is available on the cast albums The Music of Smash and Bombshell (the latter with an extended intro not heard on the show), with McPhee and Hilty's vocals from the "Pilot" episode.

The song has sold 48,000 digital downloads as of April 13, 2012.

== Production ==
Scott Wittman explained that they received notes on "Let Me Be Your Star" by NBC Entertainment President Bob Greenblatt. Greenblatt, who was nicknamed "Mr Freed" after the MGM producer of "Singin' in the Rain" and "Meet Me in St. Louis" said to the writing duo that "this has to be more universal in its story. It has to be about people who want something and fight for it."

The song fulfilled the writers' desire "to try and make each song somehow mirror what was going on in the episode." The song makes contextual sense in regards to the lives of both auditionees, and Marilyn Monroe herself.

"Let Me Be Your Star", along with other pilot songs "The National Pastime" and "Beautiful", "fit into the storyline in a realist manner and each had a purpose to them". This is one reason why the series had been described as the "anti-Glee".

In the pilot, the song is "belted" by Karen and Ivy "while walking through Times Square on the way to their callback auditions". AfterElton comments that "[they] trade verses as they and the casting panel converge for the callback, finally forming an ersatz duet as they meet outside the building where the callback is being held." Vulture describes the song as a "propulsive non-diagetic duet/duel". Yvonne Villarreal of the Los Angeles Times describes the song as a "sweeping duet battle".

Scott Brown describes the song's reprise in the second episode, "The Callback", as "[Karen and Ivy] standing center stage 'in a pool of light'...around her, phantom blondes spit spoken torments between the musical phrases".

In the seventh episode "The Workshop", Ivy sings "Let Me Be Your Star" at the musical workshop "while the musical’s creators and other observers look on".

In the eleventh episode "The Movie Star", Rebecca Duvall performs the song in a "breathy, ‘Marilyn’ voice". Roxanne Tellier of starpulse.com comments that "it’s really more talking than singing, and flat to boot". She describes the scene that the song taken place in as follows: "The production team looks at her and each other in shock. Derek cuts her off mid-note, and suggests they start working on blocking the scene. Tom and Julia tell Rebecca that she was ‘great’". This sing-speak version of the song causes Julia to tongue-in-cheekly suggest "group suicide" as the next step in workshopping.

In the fifteenth episode "Bombshell", the final chorus of the musical's new finale, "Don't Forget Me", segues into the concluding lyrics "And please let me be, let me be that star".

== Critical reception ==
"Let Me Be Your Star" has received critical acclaim. AfterElton describes the pilot version of the song as "genius, blending an amazing cocktail of determination and confidence with need and desire". It made comparisons with "The Music and the Mirror" from A Chorus Line, "Tonight" from West Side Story, and "Walk Through the Fire" from the musical Buffy the Vampire Slayer episode "Once More, with Feeling". Scott Brown of Vulture describes the song as the "best number" of the pilot, and compares the "driving, pop-injected act-ender" to "Defying Gravity" from Wicked. He comments that of all the original songs featured in the pilot, this one sounded the least "Shaimanesque", although he was confident that it would end up in the musical regardless. He says that while the song has "energy and lift", it has a repetitive "downward-gliding melody line". He adds that "the scene itself is cut for maximum 'things are happening! Happening right now!' urgency", and draws a comparison with his "favourite lyric" from the musical episode of Community "Everything's cooler when cameras are spinning / Singing and dancing in unison-in-in-ing". It has been described as a "show-stopp[er]", "an instant musical theatre classic", and the reason for an "explosive finale" to the pilot. Jarett Wieselman of TheInsider.com comments that the pilot had "as energizing a denouement as [he's] ever seen" thanks to "Let Me Be Your Star", and adds that the song could be "Smash's very own Don't Stop Believin'", i.e., Smash's unofficial theme song in the same way that Don't Stop Believin' is Glee's. MIX fm described the song as "attention-getting" and "stunning".

Scott Brown comments that in the reprise in "The Callback", the song is more suited to the slower tempo, and adds that it "gives those long phrases a chance to breathe and doesn't force them to carry a whole lot of driving rhythmic energy". JJ of TV Is My Pacifier said "“Let Me Be Your Star” got a reprise with a more sober orchestration making it a lot more sensitive. I liked the change from the version we heard at the end of the pilot."

TV Fanatic notes that in episode 11, "The Movie Star", Rebecca Duvall's version of "Let Me Be Your Star" was "[appropriately] horrendous", and adds "all Tom and Julia could say was 'great' — ha! And, even that single word pained them to say". JJ comments that she "fails to deliver". Marianne Schaberg of Character Grades said that Duvall's version at the workshop "felt like we were watching a repeat of Lana Del Rey on SNL. Yikes."

Entertainment Weekly names the song the best song of the series, noting, "The gold standard of Smash originals, this dueling diva-off capped off the spectacular pilot and set the stakes for what seemed like a phenomenal season to come. Ivy and Karen's powerhouse vocals belied their intense vulnerability as they vied to play Marilyn, and the stunning climax landed them in the heart of Times Square — just two girls with huge dreams"

== Accolades ==
On July 19, 2012, the song was nominated for a Primetime Emmy Award for Outstanding Original Music and Lyrics. In December 2012, it was also nominated for a Grammy Award for Best Song Written for Visual Media. The song lost in both categories.

== Other performances ==
Megan Hilty performed the song on NBC's New Year's Eve with Carson Daly on December 31, 2011.

Broadway star Andrew Rannells (The Book of Mormon, Falsettos, Hairspray, Hamilton, Hedwig and the Angry Inch, and Jersey Boys) performed a portion of the song in the persona of his Girls character, Elijah Krantz, during a Girls episode in which Elijah auditions for a fictional Broadway show.

== Release history ==
| Region | Date | Format | Label |
|---|---|---|---|
| United States | January 16, 2012 | Digital download - Digital Single | Columbia Records |
| United States | February 6, 2012 | Digital download - Digital Single | Columbia Records |
| United States | May 1, 2012 | Digital download - Digital Album | Columbia Records |
