= Smash season 1 =

Season 1 of the television series Smash

Smash
- Season 1
- DVD cover art
- No. of episodes: 15

Release
- Original network: NBC
- Original release: February 6 – May 14, 2012

Season chronology
- Next → Season 2

The first season of the American musical drama television series Smash premiered on February 6, 2012 on NBC and concluded on May 14, 2012, consisting of 15 episodes.

== Season synopsis ==
Julia Houston (Debra Messing) and Tom Levitt (Christian Borle), a Broadway writing team come up with the idea of a new musical based on the life of Marilyn Monroe, Bombshell. Producer Eileen Rand (Anjelica Huston), in the midst of divorce proceedings from her philandering husband, jumps on board and brings with her Derek Wills (Jack Davenport), a difficult but brilliant director. Ivy Lynn (Megan Hilty) is initially cast as Marilyn, but is forced to deal with competition from the talented, yet naive ensemble member Karen Cartwright (Katharine McPhee). Julia's former lover Michael Swift (Will Chase) is initially cast in the role of Joe DiMaggio. However, when Julia and Michael's reunion causes serious trouble in her marriage to Frank (Brian d'Arcy James), the decision is made to fire Michael. The role of Marilyn is recast with film star Rebecca Duvall (Uma Thurman), leaving Ivy devastated. After a somewhat disastrous out-of-town opening in Boston, Rebecca is felled by a peanut allergy and the actor playing Joe departs the production for a better gig. Derek casts Karen in the role of Marilyn and Michael is reinstated as Joe. Karen discovers Ivy has slept with her fiancé Dev (Raza Jaffrey), while Eileen finds out that her assistant Ellis (Jaime Cepero) was the one who poisoned Rebecca and fires him. Karen gets through her debut and the season ends with the closing number being applauded by the audience.

== Crew ==
The series is a production of Universal Television in association with DreamWorks Television. Theresa Rebeck is the creator of the series and she also wrote the pilot episode and five episodes of the first season, including the season finale. The series has a large number of executive producers including Steven Spielberg, Craig Zadan, Neil Meron, Rebeck, Darryl Frank and Justin Falvey. Marc Shaiman and Scott Wittman serve as the composers and executive producers. In March 2012, Rebeck stepped down as showrunner.

== Cast and characters ==
=== Regular ===
- Katharine McPhee as Karen Cartwright, an ingenue from Iowa, who lands a successful audition and becomes a serious contender for the role of Monroe. Somewhat new to show business, her naiveté is generally scorned by her peers, though her talent is rarely called into question. She played Marilyn for the Boston preview, when Rebecca Duvall left.
- Debra Messing as Julia Houston, a successful Broadway lyricist and the musical's co-writer. She is married with a son, but had an affair with Michael Swift, who played Joe DiMaggio in the initial Marilyn workshop. Houston is based on creator Theresa Rebeck.
- Jack Davenport as Derek Wills, the director of the musical, who will stop at nothing to make the show a success. He has an on-and-off relationship with Marilyn workshop star Ivy Lynn, though he has also shown interest in Karen Cartwright and had a physical relationship with Rebecca Duvall during the Boston preview before she left the show.
- Christian Borle as Tom Levitt, a theatrical composer and Julia's longtime songwriting partner. He and Derek Wills have an acrimonious relationship stemming from a business fallout 11 years ago. Tom briefly dates a Republican lawyer but later becomes attracted to Sam Strickland, a dancer in the ensemble of Bombshell.
- Megan Hilty as Ivy Lynn, a seasoned performer who, at the beginning of the series, is working in the ensemble of Heaven On Earth, another Broadway musical that Tom and Julia wrote. Ivy is favored by nearly everyone on board with the production to play Marilyn Monroe, but after the workshop flops, she is replaced by a big movie star. Throughout the show, she's in an on-and-off relationship with the Bombshell director Derek Wills and finds herself constantly competing with Karen in many different situations, eventually losing the role of Marilyn to her for the Boston preview.
- Anjelica Huston as Eileen Rand, the musical's tenacious producer, who is dealing with divorce proceedings from her husband, Jerry, which could threaten the musical and forces her to think outside the box in securing funds for the show. A running gag throughout the series is Eileen throwing drinks into Jerry's face.
- Jaime Cepero as Ellis Boyd Tom's and later Eileen's conniving personal assistant who is attempting to receive credit for Bombshell and make his way as a show producer. As the first season continues, Ellis, convinced his suggestion of Marilyn created the show, takes more steps to be recognized as a producer, including giving Rebecca a drink mixed with peanuts, which she is allergic to, in order to remove her as the star. He boasts of this to Eileen as proof of his skills but she responds by firing him.
- Raza Jaffrey as Dev Sundaram, Karen's live-in boyfriend, who works in the office of the New York City mayor's press secretary who ultimately forces her to choose between their relationship or her career. He proposes marriage but when Karen is unsure, Dev sleeps with Ivy. Ivy tells Karen of their encounter and an angry Karen breaks up with Dev.
- Brian d'Arcy James as Frank Houston, Julia's husband and a high-school chemistry teacher, who wishes that Julia would spend more time at home. He was upset when she confessed to her affair with Michael Swift and more so when he confronted Swift and learned Julia had cheated on him earlier in the marriage. They separated but eventually reconciled. James was credited as recurring in Season 1's pilot, but was promoted to regular from episode 2.

=== Recurring ===
- Ann Harada as Linda, the stage manager of the musical.
- Becky Ann Baker as Karen's mother.
- Dylan Baker as Roger Cartwright, Karen's father.
- Michael Cristofer as Jerry Rand, Eileen's soon-to-be ex-husband and former producing partner.
- Emory Cohen as Leo Houston, the son of Julia and Frank.
- Leslie Odom Jr. as Sam Strickland, an ensemble member, a good friend of Ivy who is gay and very much into sports. Due to their mutual friendship with Ivy, he forms a connection with Tom.
- Wesley Taylor as Bobby, an ensemble member who is not afraid to say what is on his mind. He is a friend of Ivy and later, Karen.
- Phillip Spaeth as Dennis, an ensemble member and friend of Ivy.
- Savannah Wise as Jessica, an ensemble member and friend of Ivy and later, Karen.
- Jenny Laroche as Sue, an ensemble member and friend of Ivy and later, Karen.
- Thorsten Kaye as Nick Felder, a bartender who flirts with Eileen. He later introduces Eileen to new investors and the two share a kiss.
- Will Chase as Michael Swift, a musical theatre star and Julia's old flame, cast in Marilyn in the role of Joe DiMaggio. The two rekindle their affair, are discovered by Julia's son, and break up shortly thereafter.
- Neal Bledsoe as John Goodwin, a lawyer Tom dates, who helped get Julia's son Leo out of jail. The two break up however, when John senses that Tom has feelings for Sam.
- Tala Ashe as R.J. Quigley, Dev's colleague.
- Michelle Federer as Monica Swift. Michael's estranged-wife, who left him after she found out about Michael and Julia.

=== Special guest stars ===
- Nick Jonas (since 1x04) as Lyle West, a former child star who got his start in a show written by Tom and directed by Derek. He is a potential investor for Bombshell.
- Bernadette Peters (since 1x07) as Leigh Conroy, former actress and Ivy's mother.
- Norbert Leo Butz (1x09) as a Broadway theatre actor, appearing as the main vocalist in the musical number "The Higher You Get, the Farther You Fall" from Heaven on Earth, in which Ivy returns to as an ensemble member after being dropped from Marilyn.
- Uma Thurman (1x10–1x14) as Rebecca Duvall, a Hollywood actress who wants to star in Bombshell despite having limited musical ability. Initially, the team behind Bombshell are intent on pandering to Rebecca's celebrity status, but grow increasingly exasperated by her unprofessional behavior. After the first preview, Rebecca is hospitalized after Ellis slips peanuts, which she is allergic to, in her smoothie. She eventually backs out of the show.

=== Cameos ===
- Kate Clinton, stand-up comedian and actress (1x01)
- Jordan Roth, President of Jujamcyn Theaters (1x02)
- Tom Kitt, Broadway musical director and composer of Next to Normal (1x02)
- Manny Azenburg, producer (1x03, 1x10)
- Ryan Tedder, singer-songwriter and frontman for pop rock band OneRepublic (1x08)
- Michael Riedel, theater columnist for the New York Post (1x09)
- Doug Hughes, director of plays such as Frozen and Doubt (1x09)
- Robyn Goodman, producer of such musicals as Avenue Q and In the Heights (1x10)
- Tony Yazbeck, Broadway theatre actor (1x12–1x13)
- Marc Kudisch, Broadway theatre actor (1x14), playing Darryl F. Zanuck in Bombshell
- Marc Shaiman, Broadway, TV, and movie composer (and Smash composer) (1x14)
- Scott Wittman, Broadway, TV, and movie composer (and Smash composer) (1x14)

== Episodes ==
No. overall	No. in season	Title	Directed by	Written by	Original release date	US viewers (millions)
1	1	"Pilot"	Michael Mayer	Teleplay by : Theresa Rebeck; Story by : Theresa Rebeck	February 6, 2012	11.44
World-renowned songwriting duo Julia Houston and Tom Levitt are inspired to create a new Broadway musical on the life of cultural icon Marilyn Monroe—instantly attracting the attention of tenacious producer Eileen Rand and brilliant yet temperamental director Derek Wills. As the four search for their leading lady, veteran actress Ivy Lynn becomes obsessed with winning the part and native Iowan waitress Karen Cartwright becomes desperate to make her theatrical dreams a reality.
2	2	"The Callback"	Michael Mayer	Theresa Rebeck	February 13, 2012	8.06
As Ivy and Karen both attempt to please Derek in order to win the role of Marilyn, Julia and her husband Frank become frustrated by the process of their international adoption and Eileen's acrimonious divorce complicates her attempt to finance the musical.
3	3	"Enter Mr. DiMaggio"	Michael Mayer	Theresa Rebeck	February 20, 2012	6.47
While Karen returns to Iowa to make an important decision about the future, the favorite for the role of Joe DiMaggio—Michael Swift —is discovered to be holding a secret and Eileen suspects her soon-to-be-ex-husband is sabotaging the musical by turning potential investors away.
4	4	"The Cost of Art"	Michael Morris	David Marshall Grant	February 27, 2012	6.64
When Derek hosts a party for young teen star Lyle West, Eileen seizes the opportunity to try a new strategy for raising funds. Karen learns how to increase her chances of success in the high-stakes world of Broadway and Tom goes on a special first date.
5	5	"Let's Be Bad"	Jamie Babbit	Julie Rottenberg & Elisa Zuritsky	March 5, 2012	7.76
Julia sees her relationship with Frank and their son Leo begin to fall apart when Leo is arrested, Eileen becomes associated with Tom's assistant Ellis and Ivy's relationship with Derek is strained during rehearsals.
6	6	"Chemistry"	Dan Attias	Jacquelyn Reingold	March 12, 2012	7.04
Ivy faces a major problem when her voice is injured and she struggles with the decision to use medication to save her chance at being Marilyn. Julia struggles to avoid Michael, Eileen gets to know Ellis better and Karen performs for a bar mitzvah.
7	7	"The Workshop"	Mimi Leder	Jason Grote	March 19, 2012	6.56
As the team prepares to present their work to would-be investors, Ivy is pressured to perform when her mother—Broadway star Leigh Conroy—comes back into her life. Karen is torn between the workshop and meeting a big-time music producer while Julia and Michael must face up to the consequences of their actions.
8	8	"The Coup"	Paris Barclay	Theresa Rebeck	March 26, 2012	6.14
The creative team deals with what happens after the workshop of Marilyn; Derek and Eileen try out some alternative ideas for the musical with Karen's Help. Eileen's daughter (Grace Gummer) makes a surprise visit.
9	9	"Hell on Earth"	Paul McGuigan	Scott Burkhardt	April 2, 2012	6.03
Julia and Tom come up with a new title for the recently reestablished musical; Karen and Ivy audition for an orange juice ad; Frank discovers Julia's secret affair.
10	10	"Understudy"	Adam Bernstein	Jerome Hairston	April 9, 2012	5.99
When Bombshell's new leading lady, Rebecca Duvall (Uma Thurman) gets stuck in Cuba, Derek has Karen fill in for her. Tom and Julia celebrate their anniversary. Frank and Julia's relationship starts to fall apart.
11	11	"The Movie Star"	Tricia Brock	Julie Rottenberg & Elisa Zuritsky	April 16, 2012	5.95
Karen and Ivy must work together after the arrival of Rebecca Duvall shakes up production of the musical, however Rebecca is not as good as everyone thought. Tom and Sam grow closer together. Julia and Frank must handle a family crisis.
12	12	"Publicity"	Michael Mayer	Theresa Rebeck	April 23, 2012	6.01
Karen becomes friends with Rebecca and starts to enjoy the celebrity life. Eileen and Nick grow closer together. Leo goes missing.
13	13	"Tech"	Roxann Dawson	Jason Grote & Lakshmi Sundaram	April 30, 2012	5.34
Derek starts to become romantically involved with Rebecca; Karen has to ultimately decide whether to stay with her boyfriend or stay with Bombshell; Eileen and Julia have a disagreement about rehiring Michael Swift; Sam introduces Tom to his family.
14	14	"Previews"	Robert Duncan McNeill	David Marshall Grant	May 7, 2012	5.72
The cast and crew of Bombshell are ready to face its first audience, with disappointing results. Dev attempts to reconcile with Karen, however makes a devastating decision while drunk. Frank tries adjusting to Michael Swift's sudden return in his life. Someone has it out for Rebecca as she ends up in the hospital.
15	15	"Bombshell"	Michael Morris	Theresa Rebeck	May 14, 2012	5.96
As opening night approaches, Derek makes a major decision affecting Ivy and Karen; The reconciliation between Frank and Julia must be put on hold, while Tom and Julia scramble to save Bombshell while it undergoes changes; Ellis reveals where his loyalties truly lie; will the new Marilyn be a star?

== Home media release ==
Smash: Season One was released on DVD on October 29, 2012 in the United Kingdom and on November 28, 2012 in Region 4. The same set was released in the United States and Canada on January 8, 2013.
