= Dig Deep (song) =

2012 song from the television series Smash

Single by Smash cast feat. Megan Hilty & Uma Thurman

from the album Bombshell
- Released: April 16, 2012
- Recorded: 2012
- Genre: Pop
- Length: 2:36 (Album Version)
- Label: Columbia
- Composer(s): Marc Shaiman
- Lyricist(s): Marc Shaiman; Scott Wittman
- Producer(s): Marc Shaiman

Smash cast singles chronology
""Don't Say Yes Until I Finish Talking""	"Dig Deep"	""A Thousand and One Nights""

"Dig Deep" is an original song introduced in the eleventh episode of the first season of the musical TV series Smash, entitled "The Movie Star". It was written by Marc Shaiman and Scott Wittman, but within the show's universe, it was written by the songwriting team of Tom Levitt (Christian Borle) and Julia Houston (Debra Messing) for the Bombshell musical they are working on about Marilyn Monroe.

In "The Movie Star", movie star Rebecca Duvall (Uma Thurman), who is now playing Marilyn, and the Bombshell ensemble are in a rehearsal room acting out an Actors Studio session learning some acting tips from the teacher, and then breaking into the song, while the show cuts away to a fantasy sequence of Rebecca and the ensemble dressed in 1950s clothes and performing the song.

Ivy Lynn (Megan Hilty) reprises the song in the eleventh episode of Season 2, entitled "The Dress Rehearsal", as part of Broadway previews for Bombshell.

The song was initially released as a single with Thurman's vocals but is no longer available in that version. The version with Hilty's vocals is currently available on the cast album Bombshell.

== Critical reception ==
TV Is My Pacifier commented in their review of "The Movie Star" episode that "I didn’t really love either “Our Day Will Come” or “Dig Deep...And Dig Deep really didn't make any lasting impression."
