= Don't Say Yes Until I Finish Talking =

2012 song by the cast of the American TV show, Cast

Single by Smash cast feat. Christian Borle

from the album Bombshell
- Released: April 9, 2012
- Recorded: 2012
- Genre: Pop
- Length: 2:42 (Album Version)
- Label: Columbia
- Composer: Marc Shaiman
- Lyricists: Marc Shaiman; Scott Wittman
- Producer: Marc Shaiman

Smash cast singles chronology
| ""Touch Me"" | "Don't Say Yes Until I Finish Talking" | ""Dig Deep"" |

"Don't Say Yes Until I Finish Talking" is an original song introduced in the tenth episode of the musical TV series Smash, entitled "Understudy". The song is written by Marc Shaiman and Scott Wittman, but in the show's universe, it is written by the songwriting team of Tom Levitt (Christian Borle) and Julia Houston (Debra Messing) for their Marilyn Monroe musical Bombshell.

In "Understudy", the song is performed by Tom Levitt and the male members of the ensemble of Bombshell. Tom subs in for the actor playing Darryl Zanuck in the number.

The song is performed again in the fourteenth episode of the first season, "Previews", with an unnamed actor (Marc Kudisch) playing Darryl Zanuck performing the song with the male members of the ensemble during one of the Boston previews.

The song was initially released as a single from iTunes and Amazon.com's MP3 store and is currently available as a track on the cast album Bombshell.

== Production ==
The title of the song is the same as the title of a 1971 biography of the director and producer Darryl F. Zanuck.

Katty At Law describes the piece as an "all-male number, taking place in a locker room with all the dancer boys wearing towels and yapping about how Marilyn is a pain-in-the-ass tomato." Playbill.com comments that the chorus "play cronies and yes men."

== Critical reception ==
TV Is My Pacifier described the number as "great" and "fun, and commented that they were "glad to get a full song by Borle." Katty At Law commented that the piece was "sassy and adorable."

Bitch Stole My Remote was relieved that they "finally g[o]t a beautifully sung, staged and choreographed number in the rehearsal hall that is completely uninterrupted," and was pleased with the result. While they acknowledged that it is "likely [to be] pretty expensive to do one of these," they felt that the song was a highlight of the show thus far, and was adamant that by getting "rid of the extraneous crap," the show would be able to produce more numbers like that one.

The performance of this song later inspired the character of Vox in Hazbin Hotel, also played by Christian Borle.

=== Release history ===
| Region | Date | Format | Label |
|---|---|---|---|
| United States | April 9, 2012 | Digital download - Digital Single | Columbia Records |
