= Publicity (Smash) =

- Smash episode
- Episode no.: Season 1 Episode 12
- Directed by: Michael Mayer
- Written by: Theresa Rebeck
- Original air date: April 23, 2012

Guest appearances
- Uma Thurman as Rebecca Duvall; Leslie Odom, Jr. as Sam Strickland; Thorsten Kaye as Nick; Emory Cohen as Leo Houston; Sean Dugan as Randall Jones; Michael Cristofer as Jerry Rand; John Proccacino as Cooper

Episode chronology
← Previous "The Movie Star"	Next → "Tech"
- Smash (season 1)

"Publicity" is the twelfth episode of the first season of the American television series, Smash. The episode aired on April 23, 2012.

== Plot ==
Derek (Jack Davenport) tells Karen (Katharine McPhee) he wishes she was Marilyn; Ellis (Jaime Cepero) overhears and tells Rebecca's (Uma Thurman) assistant, Randall. Rebecca makes Karen her new best friend, taking her out to party and giving her expensive clothes. The tabloids declare Karen to be Rebecca's new lover, and Dev (Raza Jaffrey) gets angry. When Karen takes Rebecca to dinner to meet Dev, Dev and Rebecca start arguing over which one is harmful to Karen.

Julia (Debra Messing) and Frank (Brian d'Arcy James) can't find Leo (Emory Cohen), each thinking Leo is with the other. Eventually, Julia drags it out of Leo's friend, Mason (Hunter Gallagher), that Leo has been sleeping on Mason's floor in order to get away from the crisis at home. Julia and Frank are able to start mending the wounds from Julia's affair.

Rebecca continues to vie for power in the company, leading to unprofessional behavior like arriving late and having the stage manager make her special smoothies; Derek is forced to retake control of his rehearsal room. Ellis and Ivy (Megan Hilty) conspire to give Ivy a chance to sing Karen's song 'Secondhand White Baby Grand'.

== Production ==
There were three featured songs in the episode, two originals and one cover ("Run" by Snow Patrol). The two originals, "A Thousand and One Nights" and "Second Hand White Baby Grand", were written by Marc Shaiman and Scott Wittman. "Run" was released on the deluxe edition of the cast album The Music of Smash on May 1, 2012. "Second Hand White Baby Grand" and "A Thousand and One Nights" were released as singles as the episode aired; the former is currently available on the cast album Bombshell.

== Critical reception ==
The A.V. Club gave the episode a C− rating.

== Accolades ==
This episode was nominated for a Primetime Emmy Award for Outstanding Music Composition for a Series (Original Dramatic Score).
