= The Parents =

- Smash episode
- Episode no.: Season 2 Episode 9
- Directed by: Tricia Brock
- Written by: Jordon Nardino
- Production code: 209
- Original air date: April 2, 2013

Guest appearances
- Jesse L. Martin as Scott Nichols; Bernadette Peters as Leigh Conroy; Jamey Sheridan as Richard Francis; Dylan Baker as Roger Cartwright

Episode chronology
← Previous "The Bells and Whistles"	Next → "The Surprise Party"
- Smash (season 2)

"The Parents" is the twenty-fourth episode overall and the ninth episode of the second season of the American television series Smash. It was written by Jordon Nardino and directed by Tricia Brock. The episode premiered on NBC on April 2, 2013. After Leigh Conroy returns to join the cast of Bombshell, Tom finds himself struggling to defuse the long-standing tension between her and her daughter, Ivy. Jimmy and Karen's connection is threatened by both Ana's new-found success and an unexpected visitor. Derek learns more about Jimmy's past just as the public sees their first piece of Hit List.

== Plot ==
Tom tries to get word to Ivy that her mother Leigh Conroy has taken the role of Marilyn's mother Gladys in Bombshell. Unfortunately, Ivy finds out just as her mother swoops into the rehearsal hall. Given their history of estrangement, Ivy is not happy. Tom struggles to get them to rehearse and use their history. Ivy and Leigh try hard to be polite to one another, to the detriment of rehearsals. Tom finally gets them to remember some of their history, but it only ends up with them fighting. As part of rehearsals, they duet on "Hang the Moon", a song of regret, as Gladys is dying. Ivy later tells Tom they aren't friends anymore.

Karen and Jimmy have just spent the night together when Karen's dad Roger arrives and Karen gets Jimmy to leave by the fire escape (Roger catches a glimpse of him). Roger attends Hit List rehearsals (for an upcoming fundraiser for their sponsor Manhattan Theater Project) where Karen reprises "Broadway, Here I Come". Roger tells his daughter he thinks she made a mistake leaving Bombshell; she tries to convince him otherwise. Roger thinks Derek is the one he saw leaving the apartment and treats him coldly. A man comes looking for Jimmy, and turns out to be his old drug dealer boss, who wants to be repaid what Jimmy stole from him.

At the Manhattan Theater Project fundraiser, Karen sings "Broadway, Here I Come!" and Ana as The Diva sings "Reach For Me", complete with aerial performance. The NY Times writer Richard Francis is wowed by Ana's performance and Kyle blurts out that the character is in a lot of act 2, only she isn't. Meanwhile, Jimmy is looking in the coatroom for something to steal when Derek catches him. Jimmy tells him what's up, and Derek later gives him the money to pay up his dealer.

Scott and Julia are trying to put their past estrangement behind them, and Scott asks her how best to enlarge a part to be co-lead. He asks her to take a look at the Hit List script (without Derek knowing) and give him some advice, which she agrees to do.

Roger tells Karen he accepts what she's doing with her career and then realizes Jimmy as the one on the fire escape. He lets slip that information to Derek, who isn't happy about it.

== Production ==
There were three songs featured in the episode, all originals (one a reprise). For the original songs, the show's in-house songwriters Marc Shaiman and Scott Wittman wrote "Hang the Moon", while Andrew McMahon wrote "Reach For Me" and Joe Iconis wrote the reprised "Broadway, Here I Come".

"Reach For Me" was released as a single for sale from iTunes and Amazon.com's MP3 store, while "Hang the Moon" is available on the cast album Bombshell.

== Critical reception ==
Sara Brady of Television Without Pity gave the episode a B− rating.
