= The Bells and Whistles =

- Smash episode
- Episode no.: Season 2 Episode 8
- Directed by: Craig Zisk
- Written by: Noelle Valdivia
- Production code: 208
- Original air date: March 27, 2013

Guest appearances
- Jesse L. Martin as Scott Nichols; Daphne Rubin-Vega as Agnes; Jamey Sheridan as Richard Francis

Episode chronology
← Previous "Musical Chairs"	Next → "The Parents"
- Smash (season 2)

"The Bells and Whistles" is the twenty third episode of the American television series Smash. It was written by Noelle Valdivia and directed by Craig Zisk. The episode premiered on NBC on March 26, 2013, the eighth episode of Season 2. Ivy brings Sam back to New York City which makes things uncomfortable for Tom. Jimmy finds himself at odds with Derek regarding Hit List. Ana and Karen struggle with being assertive.

== Plot ==
Jimmy Collins (Jeremy Jordan) and Derek Wills (Jack Davenport) clash about Hit List. Derek wants to go with a big production for "I Heard Your Voice In a Dream" but Jimmy wants it to be more simple and Karen Cartwright (Katharine McPhee) agrees with him. Tom Levitt (Christian Borle) and Julia Houston (Debra Messing) visit the set and Tom, who is having issues with standing up for himself as Bombshell's director, has a talk with Derek about being forceful and getting things done. Derek gets Tom's point about listening and sits down and listens to Jimmy about his concerns for the song. They decide to forgo Derek's desired video screens and just use dancers for the number as a way to keep the Hit List characters of Jesse and Amanda apart.

Ivy Lynn (Megan Hilty) reprises "Let Me Be Your Star" in rehearsal as the Bombshell ensemble happily applauds that she's back in the lead. Tom struggles to assert himself as director of Bombshell. His ex-boyfriend Sam Strickland (Leslie Odom, Jr.) returns to town for a visit and says he's unhappy with his Book of Mormon role and Tom offers him a part in Bombshell. Julia tells him there isn't room for Sam. After the Bombshell group has some fun together with Sam singing the song "(Let's Start) Tomorrow Tonight" that Tom and Julia wrote for a never-finished 60s musical, Tom offers to put the song into the show. Producer Eileen Rand (Anjelica Huston) finally comes down hard on him, telling him the song doesn't fit. Tom has his talk with Derek about being forceful and finally tells Sam he and the song can't be in the show. Sam angrily stalks off. Eileen and her publicist Agnes (Daphne Rubin-Vega) have been trying to get Richard Francis' (Jamey Sheridan) attention to write a positive piece about Bombshell in the New York Times. She finally hits upon an idea and tells Tom that she has asked Leigh Conroy, big Broadway star and Ivy's mom, to come out of retirement to do the role of Gladys, Marilyn's mom. Tom thinks that Ivy might have a problem with it, but tells Eileen to go ahead with the PR and will settle it with Ivy.

Karen and roommate and fellow cast member Ana Vargas (Krysta Rodriguez) push each other to ask for what they want. At a Hit List cast party at a bar, Ana, who wants the Diva role in Hit List but has been afraid to push for it, gets Derek's attention and sings "If I Were a Boy" on the bar. Derek is impressed and tells her she has the role. Karen is interested in Jimmy but is afraid to tell him. At the same party, slightly drunk, she finally asks him if he likes her or not. He gets interrupted by Derek and Karen asks him to walk her home. At her apartment after Derek leaves, there's a knock at the door and it's Jimmy. He gets her in a steamy kiss and the episode ends with them on a table taking off their clothes.

== Production ==
There were four songs featured in the episode, three originals (one a reprise) and one cover ("If I Were a Boy" by Beyoncé). For the original songs, the show's in-house songwriters Marc Shaiman and Scott Wittman wrote the reprised "Let Me Be Your Star" and "(Let's Start) Tomorrow Tonight", while Andrew McMahon wrote "I Heard Your Voice in a Dream".

"I Heard Your Voice in a Dream" and "If I Were a Boy" were released as singles for sale from iTunes and Amazon.com's MP3 store, while "Let Me Be Your Star" and "(Let's Start) Tomorrow Tonight" are available on the cast album Bombshell and the former is available on the cast album The Music of Smash. McMahon was nominated for an Emmy for "I Heard Your Voice In a Dream."

== Critical reception ==
Sara Brady of Television Without Pity gave the episode a C rating.
