= Henry Stram =

American actor and singer (born 1954)

- Born: September 10, 1954 (age 72); Lafayette, Indiana, U.S.
- Education: Juilliard School (BFA)
- Occupations: Actor, singer
- Known for: See What I Wanna See

Henry Stram (born September 10, 1954) is an American actor and singer. He is the son of Hall of Fame NFL coach Hank Stram.

== Early life ==
Stram grew up in Kansas City, while his father was the coach of the Kansas City Chiefs. He performed with The Barn Players until he moved to New York City in 1973 and studied acting at the Juilliard School. While at Juilliard, he frequented Cafe La Fortuna, a cafe that opened in 1976 and was known for its garden, opera music and Italian desserts.

== Career ==
Among Stram's stage credits are Titanic, The Crucible, The Elephant Man, and Fly by Night. Stram came under fire in 2009 while performing in the Rebecca Gilman stage adaption of The Heart Is a Lonely Hunter by Carson McCullers. Stram was playing a deaf character, and since he is not in real life, it was said of him, "A hearing actor playing a deaf character is tantamount to putting a white actor in blackface" by a member of the board of the Alliance for Inclusion in the Arts. The National Association of the Deaf, Deaf West Theater, and others demanded that the director, Doug Hughes, and the New York Theatre Workshop replace Stram with an actual deaf actor. Stram had played the role in 2005 in the premiere of the show in Atlanta.

In 2012, he participated in Shinsai, which was a benefit concert to support the victims of the Fukushima Daiichi nuclear disaster along with Patti LuPone, Richard Thomas, Mary Beth Hurt, Jay O. Sanders, Jennifer Lim and Angela Lin. The same year, he was in the cast of Rebecca, but the show was closed after it was discovered one of the investors never existed with a following criminal investigation. Ben Sprecher, a producer, hoped it would have a run in 2013.

== Personal life ==
Stram has been with actor Martin Moran since they met while rehearsing The Making of Americans together in 1985. They since have done many shows together. Moran said of their meeting in a 2006 interview, "I remember what a surprise, what a thrill it was, when the coolest actor in the group the one who'd worked with Richard Foreman and at the Guthrie and graduated from Juilliard! started walking me to my subway stop after rehearsals. That was February 1985, twenty-one Valentine Days ago. Since then, we've made a life together through the vagaries of this nutty, blessed business".

== Stage credits ==
=== Broadway ===
- Titanic (1997) – as 3rd Class Passenger/Frank Carlson/George Widener
- The Crucible (2002) – as Ezekiel Cheever
- Inherit the Wind (2007) – as Mr. Goodfellow
- The Elephant Man (2014) – Carr Gomm, Conductor
- Junk: The Golden Age of Debt (2017) – Maximilien Cizik
- Network (2018) – Continuity Announcer

=== Off-Broadway ===
- Mother Courage and Her Children/King Lear (1978, in repertoire) – The American Place Theatre, as Soldier and stretcher bearer
- The Cradle Will Rock (1983) – American Place Theatre/Douglas Fairbanks Theatre, as Dick/Junior Mister
- The Making of Americans (1985) – Music-Theatre Group,
- 1951 (1986) – Perry Street Theatre, as Ray/Bertolt Brecht/Elia Kazan
- Black Seas Follies (1987) – Playwrights Horizons, as Misha
- Prison-Made Tuxedos (1987) – Music-Theatre Group, as Henry
- Cinderella/Cendrillon (1988) – Music-Theatre Group, as Pandolfe
- La Vie Parisienne (1988) – Opera at the Academy, as The Anarchist
- A Bright Room Called Day (1991) – Joseph Papp Public Theater/LuEsther Hall, as Gregory Bazwald
- On the Open Road (1993) – Joseph Papp Public Theater/Martinson Hall, as Monk
- All's Well That Ends Well (1993) – Delacorte Theater, as Lafeau
- Christina Alberta's Father (1994) – Vineyard Theatre, as Albert Edward Preemby
- Jack's Holiday (1995) – Playwrights Horizons, as Snatchem Leese
- Troilus and Cressida (1995) – Delacorte Theater, as Priam/Menelaus/Servant
- The Grey Zone (1996) – MCC Theater, as Josef Mengele
- Henry V (1996) – Delacorte Theater
- Timon of Athens (1996) – Delacorte Theater, as Flavius
- Dancing on Her Knees (1996) – The Public Theatre/LuEshter Hall, as Matthias
- The Winter's Tale (2000) – Delacorte Theater, as Camillo
- Waste (2000) – American Place Theatre, as Sir Gilbert Wedgecroft
- Unwrap Your Candy (2001) – Vineyard Theatre
- The Persians (2003) – Michael Schimmel Center for the Arts, as Counsellor
- See What I Wanna See (2005) – The Public Theatre/Anspacher Theater, as The Janitor/Priest
- Rags and Bones (2007) – Rattlestick Theatre, as The Poet
- The Heart Is a Lonely Hunter (2009) – New York Theatre Workshop, as John Singer
- The Illusion (2011) – Peter Norton Space, as The Amanuensis
- Septimus and Clarissa (2011) – Baruch Performing Arts Center
- Charles Ives Take Me Home (2013) – Rattlestick Theatre, as Charles Ives
- Fly by Night (2014) - Playwrights Horizons, as The Narrator
- The School for Scandal (2016) – Lucille Lortel Theatre, as Sir Oliver Surface

=== Off-off Broadway ===
- Eddie Goes to Poetry City (Part 2) (1991) – La MaMa
- The Mind King (1992) – St. Mark's Theatre/Ontological-Hysteric Theater
- My Head Was a Sledge Hammer (1994) – St. Mark's Theatre/Ontological-Hysteric Theater

=== Regional ===
- Cyrano de Bergerac (1980) – Long Wharf Theatre
- The Lion in Winter (1981) – Long Wharf Theatre
- Major Barbara (1987) – Baltimore's Center Stage, as Cusins
- The Cherry Orchard (1988) – Arena Stage, as Trofimov
- Offshore Signals (1988) – The Repertory Theatre of St. Louis, as Schmuel
- Julius Caesar (1989) – Trinity Repertory Company
- On The Town (1989) – Trinity Repertory Company, as Ozzie
- Summerfolk (1989) – Trinity Repertory Company,
- Shout and Twist (1990) – Odyssey Theatre (Los Angeles), as Hamlet
- Wonderful Tennessee (1994) – McCarter Theatre, as Frank
- The Importance of Being Earnest—McCarter Theatre, as Jack Worthing
- The Mandrake Root (2001) – Long Wharf Theatre, as Robert Randall
- Lipstick Traces (2002) – Macgowan Little Theater, as Malcolm McLaren
- What Embarrassments (2003) – Wilma Theater, as Henry James
- Singing Forest (2005) – Long Wharf Theatre, Dr. Shar Unger
- The Birthday Party (2006) – McCarter Theatre, as Stanley
- Rocket to the Moon (2006) – Long Wharf Theatre, as Frenchy
- Spring Awakening (2008) – Original National Tour, Adult Man

== Filmography ==
=== Film ===
- Strong Medicine (1981)
- Vamping (1984) – Deacon
- Regarding Henry (1991) – Waiter
- The Real McCoy (1993) – Cashier
- Angela (1995) – Man at Fair
- Jeffrey (1995) – Cousin Gary
- Sleepers (1996) – Prison Doctor
- Calendar the Siamese (1997, Short)
- Illuminata (1998) – Captain
- Cradle Will Rock (1999) – Maxine Elliot's – Hiram Sherman
- Requiem for a Dream (2000) – ECT Technician
- The Caveman's Valentine (2001) – Social Worker
- The Grey Zone (2001) – SS-Hauptsturmführer Josef Mengele
- Cold Souls (2009) – Telegin
- She's Lost Control (2014) – Marty Falk
- Angelica (2015) – Dr. Willette
- Irrational Man (2015) – Cocktail Party Guest
- Submission (2017) – Dave Sterret
- The Greatest Showman (2017) – Ticket Taker
- Ben Is Back (2018) – Mr. Richman

=== Television ===
- New York News (1995) – "Welcome Back Cotter" as Assistant Coroner
- Central Park West (1995) – "The History of Gil and Rachel" as Communique Staff
- Law & Order (1997) – "Working Mom" as Kaplan
- Law & Order (2000) – "Standoff" as Daniel Kiley
- NYPD Blue (2000) – "The Man with Two Right Shoes" as Martin
- Kingpin (2003) – "French Connection"
- Star Trek: Enterprise (2003) – "The Breach" as Hudak
- Law & Order (2004) – "Hands Free" as Eli Madison
- Law & Order: Criminal Intent (2004) – "Eosphoros" as Wayne Callaway
- Conviction (2006) – "Breakup"
- Boardwalk Empire (2010) – "Belle Femme" as D.W. Fletcher
- White Collar (2012) – "Pulling Strings" as Maurie
- Smash (2012–13) – "The Movie Star", "Publicity", "The Dress Rehearsal", and "Opening Night"as Justin/Marilyn's Improv Teacher
- The Americans (2013) – "The Clock" as Man in Group
- Mozart in the Jungle (2015) – "Touché Maestro, Touché" as Process Server.
- The Detour (2017) – "The Court" as INS Agent Richardson
- The Good Fight (2021) – "And the Firm Had Two Partners..." as Dr. Bernard
- The Blacklist (2022) – "Dr. Razmik Maier, No. 168" as Dr. Razmik Maier
- The Gilded Age (2022) – 2 episodes as Lewis
