= On Broadway (Smash) =

- Smash episode
- Episode no.: Season 2 Episode 1
- Directed by: Michael Morris
- Written by: Joshua Safran
- Production code: 201
- Original air date: February 5, 2013

Guest appearances
- Jennifer Hudson as Veronica Moore; Brian d'Arcy James as Frank Houston; Thorsten Kaye as Nick; Michael Cristofer as Jerry Rand

Episode chronology
← Previous "Bombshell"	Next → "The Fallout"
- Smash (season 2)

"On Broadway" is the sixteenth episode and the second-season premiere of the American musical drama television series Smash. The episode was written by Joshua Safran and directed by Michael Morris. It premiered on NBC on February 5, 2013. Bombshell returns to New York in hopes of landing a theater for its Broadway debut, but a new scandal puts its fate in jeopardy.

== Plot ==
"On Broadway" picks up three weeks after the events of the first-season finale. The cast and crew of the musical Bombshell return to New York City following out-of-town tryouts in Boston, to mixed critical reviews. Bombshell is shut down by the government because producer Eileen Rand (Anjelica Huston) has used some dirty money to finance it.

Karen Cartwright (Katharine McPhee) reprises "Let Me Be Your Star" during a rehearsal for a party for Bombshell to get potential investors. She also sings "Cut, Print...Moving On" as Marilyn Monroe during Bombshell's last night in Boston. Karen also duets with Broadway star Veronica Moore (Jennifer Hudson) on "On Broadway" at the party for Bombshell. Veronica is shown during her Beautiful musical that she's in singing "Mama Makes Three" with the show's ensemble.

Ivy Lynn (Megan Hilty), who has been dropped from Bombshell, goes to an audition and sings "Don't Dream It's Over" over a montage of the various characters. Karen moves in with her new roommate and old friend Ana Vargas (Krysta Rodriguez). At the end of the episode, Karen overhears Jimmy Collins (Jeremy Jordan) singing "Broadway, Here I Come!", part of a musical that's being written by Jimmy and his friend Kyle Bishop (Andy Mientus). She dials Derek Wills (Jack Davenport) and has him listen to the song because they are looking for something to do while Bombshell is shut down.

== Production ==
Oscar-winner and American Idol alumni Jennifer Hudson is featured in the episode as Broadway star and two-time Tony winner Veronica Moore, who is currently in the musical Beautiful. Hudson has a three episode arc, for which this episode is the first. Brian d'Arcy James, who had been cut from the cast after Season 1, appears as a guest star.

Six songs are featured in the episode, four of them originals (one a reprise) and two covers ("On Broadway" by The Drifters and "Don't Dream It's Over" by Crowded House). For the original songs, the show's in-house songwriters Marc Shaiman and Scott Wittman wrote "Cut, Print...Moving On", "Mama Makes Three", and the reprised "Let Me Be Your Star", while "Broadway, Here I Come" was written by Joe Iconis.

"On Broadway", "Mama Makes Three", and "Broadway, Here I Come!" were released as singles for sale on iTunes and Amazon.com's MP3 store. "Cut, Print...Moving On" and "Let Me Be Your Star" are available on the cast album The Music of Smash and the latter on the cast album Bombshell.

== Critical reception ==
Sara Brady at Television Without Pity gave the episode a C rating.
