= Never Give All the Heart =

Song from the American television series, Smash

Single by Smash cast feat. Katharine McPhee and Megan Hilty

from the album Bombshell
- Released: April 09, 2012
- Recorded: 2012
- Genre: Pop
- Length: 3:13 (Single version)
- Label: Columbia
- Composer(s): Marc Shaiman
- Lyricist(s): Marc Shaiman; Scott Wittman
- Producer(s): Marc Shaiman

Smash cast singles chronology
"Never Give All the Heart"	""The National Pastime""

"Never Give All the Heart" is an original song introduced in the first episode of the first season of the musical TV series Smash, titled "Pilot".

The number was written by Marc Shaiman and Scott Wittman, but within the Smash universe the song is depicted as having been written by songwriting duo Julia Houston (Debra Messing) and Tom Levitt (Christian Borle) for a musical based on Marilyn Monroe's life titled Bombshell.

While a portion of the song is sung by Ivy Lynn (Megan Hilty) in the pilot, Karen Cartright (Katharine McPhee) sings the song in its entirety in the tenth episode "Understudy". Ivy Lynn's version of "Never Give All the Heart" was performed in the show as demo track that was recorded for Tom and Julia as they pondered actually attempting the Marilyn musical. Karen, on the other hand, sings the song to the Bombshell producers and director in the last minute of her episode. The song was also reprised in the sixth episode of Season 2, "The Fringe" by Karen, as a more uptempo version than previous renditions.

The song was released as a single on iTunes and as a track on the cast album Bombshell. The rendition on the single and the standard edition of the Bombshell album is McPhee's version; Hilty's version is a track on the Smash the Complete Season 2 album as a bonus.

== Production ==
Providing a "tantalizing glimpse into a more Norma Jean characterization of Marilyn for the Arthur Miller marriage segments", 'Never Give All The Heart” was based on an actual favorite poem of Marilyn’s (by Yeats), as described in the elegant lyrics.

More than a month after performing an excerpt of the song in the pilot, Megan Hilty was asked by interviewer Pat Cerasaro of broadwayworld.com if she would be "singing the full 'Never Give All The Heart' at some point soon", to which she replied, "Well, I can’t tell you what I am singing in every show! I can’t give it all away! [Laughs.]" Around the same time, she commented that "[Never Give All the Heart] is an incredible song and I will tell you that you will hear more of that song, but I won’t tell you who is singing it!" In reality, the song was performed on the show in its entirety by Katharine McPhee a few weeks later.

== Critical reception ==
Cartright's "exquisitely and evocatively emotional 'Never Give All The Heart' [which gave] way to a grand diva entrance for the highly anticipated debut of movie star Rebecca Duvall (guest star Uma Thurman), who took the applause...as she walked into the room" was described by Pat Cerasaro of broadwayworld.com as "a nod to Michael Bennett’s heart-stopping coup de theatre Act One Finale for DREAMGIRLS". He continued by stating that Katharine McPhee's big musical moment, the "crowning achievement" of 'Never Give All The Heart', was a perfect example of where "the plot and music were drawn together pleasingly and provocatively", and described it as being both "perhaps the finest ballad from BOMBSHELL" and "new series highlight".

Ryann Ferguson from BroadwaySpotted was surprised that Karen’s rendition of "Never Give All the Heart" worked well in the episode (Understudy). He liked that she didn’t really sing it in character as Marilyn (although clips of previous episodes where she was Marilyn flashed on the screen as she sang) as it managed to be more authentic as a whole. He explains that cruel realism of scene by saying, "[the song] set up the sad fact that just as she was starting to get good, in walks some miscast movie star. And the applause that should have been for her sweet, well-sung performance, instead were merely entrance applause for a bigger fish. But that’s show biz."

Los Angeles Times gave the song a rating of 4 out of 5 Jazz Hands, saying:

We heard a bit of this torch song in the pilot, when Ivy cut the demo and Karen sang along on YouTube (oh, how the tables have turned), but it was lovely to hear it all the way through in Karen’s voice. Of all the Marilyn numbers, this one is suited most to her breathy tone, and she does become Marilyn for a few seconds in the middle for me. More so than when she is doing her line-read, and Derek suddenly envisions her in costume. All I heard then was Karen’s voice transforming into that of Derek Zoolander. Listen again, trust me.

— Los Angeles Times,

== Technical trivia ==
The song is in the key of Bb Major, ranges from F#3-C5, and the tempo is described on the sheet music as being "ballad style, [sung] freely with expression" (q = 100).

The publisher for the sheet music is Alfred Publishing Co., Inc.
