= Stram =

Stram is a surname. Notable people with the surname include:

- Hank Stram (1923–2005), American football coach
- Henry Stram (born 1954), American actor and singer, son of Hank Stram
