= On Lexington & 52nd Street =

Single by Smash cast feat. Will Chase

from the album Bombshell
- Released: March 19, 2012
- Recorded: 2012
- Genre: Pop
- Length: 3:08 (Album Version)
- Label: Columbia
- Composer: Marc Shaiman
- Lyricists: Marc Shaiman; Scott Wittman
- Producer: Marc Shaiman

Smash cast singles chronology
""Let's Be Bad""	"On Lexington & 52nd Street"	""Touch Me""

"On Lexington & 52nd Street" (also "Lexington & 52nd Street") is an original song introduced in the seventh episode of the first season of the musical TV series Smash, entitled "The Workshop". The song is written by Marc Shaiman and Scott Wittman, but in the show's universe, it is written by the songwriting team of Tom Levitt (Christian Borle) and Julia Houston (Debra Messing) for their Marilyn Monroe musical Bombshell.

In "The Workshop", Michael Swift (Will Chase), playing Joe DiMaggio, performs the song as DiMaggio breaks up with his wife Monroe, while Michael is simultaneously breaking up with Julia.

The song was originally released as a single from iTunes and Amazon.com's MP3 story and is currently a track on the cast album Bombshell.

== Critical reception ==
Series Regular describes the song as a "surprise" and notes "There is a passion and anger behind the music that was quite unexpected and refreshing to listen to. It is a major contrast to the other songs in the musical, and the performance of Will Chase is actually quite stellar." Broadwayworld.com describes the song as "striking and wholly stylistically unique", and "Will Chase’s best (and, apparently, last) showcase." It continues by saying "film noir with a pulsating, almost atonal, steely and terse tinge, this is the sort of character number that seamlessly presents plot development and character exposition simultaneously in a purely, thrillingly theatrical manner and the type of dramatic and musical merging of storytelling SMASH excels at above absolutely everything else, time after time after time after time."

=== Release history ===
Region	Date	Format	Label
United States	March 19, 2012	Digital download - Digital Single	Columbia Records
