= Bombshell (Smash) =

- Smash episode
- Episode no.: Season 1 Episode 15
- Directed by: Michael Morris
- Written by: Theresa Rebeck
- Production code: 115
- Original air date: May 14, 2012

Guest appearances
- Bernadette Peters as Leigh Conroy; Nick Jonas as Lyle West; Will Chase as Michael Swift; Emory Cohen as Leo Houston; Leslie Odom, Jr. as Sam Strickland; Michael Cristofer as Jerry Rand

Episode chronology
| ← Previous "Previews" | Next → "On Broadway" |
- Smash (season 1)

"Bombshell" is the fifteenth episode and first-season finale of the American television series, Smash. The episode was written by series creator Theresa Rebeck and directed by Michael Morris. It premiered on the NBC network on May 14, 2012. In "Bombshell", Derek (Jack Davenport) has to choose Rebecca Duvall's (Uma Thurman) replacement in time for the show's opening night. The decision changes both Ivy (Megan Hilty) and Karen's (Katharine McPhee) lives forever. Tom (Christian Borle) and Julia (Debra Messing) hurry to save the show, while Ellis show his true colors to Eileen (Anjelica Huston). Lyle West (Nick Jonas) returns with bad news and "Bombshell" continues its previews in Boston.

== Plot ==
Derek (Jack Davenport) makes Karen (Katharine McPhee) the new Marilyn. This means that not only does Karen have to perfect things she's never done before, but costumes have to be refitted to Karen's size. Karen is still green, and everyone but Derek has doubts, which is only worsened when each number has multiple problems. Eileen (Anjelica Huston) tells Derek that Karen cannot do Marilyn, and tries to get Derek to fire her, but Derek refuses and insists Eileen respect his artistic vision. Ivy (Megan Hilty) asks Derek why he chose Karen and not her, and Derek replies it was because he could imagine Karen as Marilyn, and that Karen has something Ivy doesn't.

Ellis (Jamie Cepero), in his continuing quest to be producer, tells Eileen that he put the peanuts in Rebecca's smoothie as a favor to the company, and demands Eileen treat him as a producer; Eileen fires him on the spot and kicks him out of the theater. Ellis vows to return. Although promotion materials indicated that Lyle West (Nick Jonas) would return with bad news, he simply returns to give Eileen her painting and see the show. Tom (Christian Borle) and Julia (Debra Messing) struggle to come up with a proper ending; Julia finally draws on inspiration from her relationship struggles with Frank (Brian d'Arcy James) to end the show on a high note while still realistically depicting Monroe's death.

Dev (Raza Jaffrey) asks Ivy if she found the engagement ring he left in her room when they slept together, and she lies and says she hasn't. Later, Ivy returns the ring to Karen instead, and when Karen asks what she was doing with the ring in the first place, Ivy responds that Dev is very 'Joe DiMaggio'. Karen confronts Dev about cheating on her with Ivy, and Karen dumps Dev.

Karen eventually cracks, pulling off her wig, and Derek finds her curled up in a ball. He tells her to exploit her pain to be a better actress, and she pulls herself together right as Eileen, Tom, and Julia are about to put Ivy in as Marilyn; they concede the point to Derek, breaking Ivy's heart. Karen as Marilyn proves to be an enormous success, getting rapturous applause for her show-stopping finale- before she's even finished singing. The season ends on a cliffhanger, with Ivy planning on committing suicide by overdosing on a whole bottle of sleeping pills.

== Production ==
New York Post theatre critic Michael Riedel was to make a second cameo appearance as himself in this episode, but his scene did not air.

== Reception ==
In its original broadcast, "Bombshell" was watched by 5.96 million American viewers, attaining a 1.8 rating/5 share in the key adults 18–49 demographic.
