= The Movie Star =

- Smash episode
- Episode no.: Season 1 Episode 11
- Directed by: Tricia Brock
- Written by: Julie Rottenberg and Elisa Zuritsky
- Original air date: April 16, 2012

Guest appearances
- Uma Thurman as Rebecca Duvall; Neal Bledsoe as John Goodwin; Leslie Odom, Jr. as Sam Strickland; Thorsten Kaye as Nick; Emory Cohen as Leo Houston; Sean Dugan as Randall Jones; Betsy Aidem as Guidance Counselor; Charlie Semine as Paul Denby

Episode chronology
| ← Previous "Understudy" | Next → "Publicity" |
- Smash (season 1)

"The Movie Star" is the eleventh episode of the American television series, Smash. The episode aired on April 16, 2012.

== Plot ==
Rehearsal with Rebecca Duvall (Uma Thurman) as Marilyn gets off to a bumpy start. Within minutes, everyone realizes Duvall can't sing very well. Additionally, Duvall is unprofessional and self-centered, continually trying to change the show, blowing off events and showing up late, and creating a scene when a drunken ex-lover crashes rehearsal. In order to compensate for Duvall's lack of theatrical skills, Derek creates bigger parts for Karen (Katharine McPhee) and the newly rehired Ivy (Megan Hilty). Derek continues fantasizing about Karen as Marilyn. Eventually, when Duvall shows awareness of her weaknesses and a willingness to work on them, it becomes smoother for Eileen, Derek, Tom, and Julia to work with her.

Dev (Raza Jaffrey) continues to not tell Karen about losing the press secretary gig, so Karen finds out from the guy who did get the press secretary job. Karen and Dev continue to drift further away from each other, while Dev gets closer to R.J. (Tala Ashe). Karen and Ivy bond over a shared rivalry with Duvall. Tom (Christian Borle) and Sam (Leslie Odom, Jr.) go out on a date, and Sam insists they take things slow. Eileen (Anjelica Huston) gets scared of getting close to Nick, and Nick soothes her fears. Leo (Emory Cohen) has trouble with his grades at school, and Frank (Brian d'Arcy James) and Julia must find a way to put aside their issues and help Leo out of his rough patch.

== Production ==
There were three featured songs in the episode, two originals (one a reprise) and one cover ("Our Day Will Come" by Ruby & the Romantics). For the originals, in-house songwriters Marc Shaiman and Scott Wittman wrote "Dig Deep" and the reprised "Let Me Be Your Star".

"Dig Deep" with Thurman's vocals, was released as a single on iTunes and Amazon.com's MP3 store, though the single is currently not available. "Our Day Will Come" is currently available on the deluxe edition of the cast album The Music of Smash. "Let Me Be Your Star" was previously released as a single and is currently available on the cast albums The Music of Smash and Bombshell.
