= The Surprise Party (Smash) =

- Smash episode
- Episode no.: Season 2 Episode 10
- Directed by: S.J. Clarkson
- Written by: Julie Rottenberg; Elisa Zuritsky
- Production code: 210
- Original air date: April 6, 2013

Guest appearances
- Jesse L. Martin as Scott Nichols; Liza Minnelli as herself; Jamey Sheridan as Richard Francis; Daphne Rubin-Vega as Agnes; [[Michael Riedel (journalist); Michael Riedel]] as himself

Episode chronology
← Previous "The Parents"	Next → "The Dress Rehearsal"
- Smash (season 2)

"The Surprise Party" is the twenty fifth episode of the American television series Smash. It was written by Julie Rottenberg and Elisa Zuritsky and directed by S.J. Clarkson. The episode premiered on NBC on April 6, 2013, the tenth episode of Season 2. With Liza Minnelli in town, Tom plans a surprise for Ivy in an attempt to find a balance between their work life and their friendship. Relations between Karen, Jimmy, and Derek explode just as Hit List's rehearsal process nears its close. While Richard asks Eileen to spend less time at work and more time with him, Julia finds herself also pulled away from Bombshell by an unlikely source.

== Plot ==
Karen Cartwright (Katharine McPhee) and Jimmy Collin (Jeremy Jordan) rehearse a Hit List number called "Original" with the Hit List ensemble. Later Karen tells Jimmy she is uncomfortable with his request to keep their relationship a secret while they keep making out in the wardrobe closet. After talking it over with her roommate Ana Vargas (Krysta Rodriguez), she tells Jimmy they are done unless their relationship is public. Derek Wills (Jack Davenport) happens upon Karen working through her script on set and has been drinking a little, and ends up hinting to Karen that he's interested in her. She tells him she's in a relationship with Jimmy and that she's sorry about the timing. During a rehearsal, Derek, stewing that Jimmy and Karen are together, explodes at Jimmy's dialogue performance and things nearly come to blows between them and they end up revealing that Derek told Jimmy to stay away from Karen. Karen gets mad at both of them and tells them not to control her and stalks out. Later, Jimmy comes to Karen's apartment steps late at night and apologizes. He asks for another chance and promises they can be public. Karen gives in and goes with him for a drink, but is concerned when she finds a bag of drugs in Jimmy's coat that he gave her to wear.

Ivy Lynn (Megan Hilty) is still mad at Tom Levitt (Christian Borle) for bringing her mother on board and clashes with him during Bombshell technical rehearsals. He laments to Julia Houston (Debra Messing) that this directing stuff is hard when everyone hates him. Ivy is invited out by best friend Sam Strickland (Leslie Odom, Jr.) and the Bombshell cast for her birthday, but keeps it from Tom. Tom tries to make up with Ivy by calling Liza Minnelli (playing herself) to meet him and Ivy for dinner. Ivy is overwhelmed to see Liza and Tom and Liza sing "A Love Letter From the Times" to Ivy that he wrote. Eileen Rand (Anjelica Huston), who Tom told about Liza, and Agnes (Daphne Rubin-Vega), Bombshell's publicist, arrange for the press to take pictures of Ivy and Tom with Liza to get press for Bombshell. Theater critic Michael Riedel (playing himself) also shows up. Ivy is put out by this and gets mad at Tom about it. Tom finds Ivy later at her birthday party to return some keys she left with him and is sad that he wasn't invited to the party. They partially make up, but Ivy tells him that they can't be good friends while he's her director. We hear but don't see Ivy singing "Bittersweet Symphony" over a montage of the various characters. Ivy's the last one at the party, a little bit drunk, when Derek walks in and gives her a present and wishes her happy birthday.

Julia is still helping Scott Nichols (Jesse L. Martin) with Hit List, particularly in how to enlarge The Diva's part. They meet with Kyle Bishop (Andy Mientus), one half of the Hit List team and Julia gets him to storyboard the musical and helps him figure out how to improve The Diva role. They decide to make The Diva (being played by Ana) a bigger presence in the musical, especially in the second half, which will come at the expense of Karen's part. While Kyle is momentarily doing something else, Julia and Scott talk about the old days and Scott tells her he had a thing for her but she was married so he kept quiet. Later, the three present their Diva idea to Derek, who is still a little ticked about his fight with Karen and Jimmy; he loves the idea and doesn't seem bothered that Karen's part will be lessened. Scott asks Julia to continue as a consultant for Hit List. She agrees and tells him if he's still interested in her, he doesn't have to be quiet about it.

Richard Francis (Jamey Sheridan) and Eileen go out to dinner (the same place where Tom and Ivy meet up with Liza) and he's a little upset that she did some work with the paparazzi when it was supposed to be just the two of them. Later, he tells her that in his previous marriage, his wife didn't work and he got used to that, so Eileen as a working woman is something new to which he has to get accustomed. Eileen tells him she still has some baggage from her previous relationship, so they agree to take it slow.

== Production ==
There were three songs featured in the episode, two originals and one cover ("Bitter Sweet Symphony" by The Verve). For the originals, the show's in-house songwriters Marc Shaiman and Scott Wittman wrote "A Love Letter From the Times", while Pasek and Paul wrote "Original" (per the episode's credits).

All three songs were released as singles for sale from iTunes and Amazon.com's MP3 store.

== Critical reception ==
Sara Brady of Television Without Pity gave the episode a C rating.
