= The Coup (Smash) =

- Smash episode
- Episode no.: Season 1 Episode 8
- Directed by: Paris Barclay
- Written by: Theresa Rebeck
- Original air date: March 26, 2012

Guest appearances
- Ryan Tedder as himself; Grace Gummer as Katie Rand; Will Chase as Michael Swift; Neal Bledsoe as John Goodwin; Emory Cohen as Leo Houston; Thorsten Kaye as Nick; Leslie Odom, Jr. as Sam Strickland; Michael Cristofer as Jerry Rand; Charlie Semine as Mr. Denby

Episode chronology
← Previous "The Workshop"	Next → "Hell on Earth"
- Smash (season 1)

"The Coup" is the eighth episode of the American television series, Smash. The episode aired on March 26, 2012.

== Plot ==
The creative team deals with what happens after the workshop of Marilyn; Derek (Jack Davenport) asks Karen (Katharine McPhee) to help him take the show from the writers; Eileen's (Anjelica Huston) daughter (guest star Grace Gummer) makes a surprise visit.

== Production ==
Guest stars include Grace Gummer as "Mahatma" Katie Rand, the daughter of Eileen and Jerry, OneRepublic's Ryan Tedder as himself, and Michael Cristofer as Eileen's estranged husband, Jerry Rand.

The episode included "Touch Me", an original number performed by Katharine McPhee and written by Ryan Tedder, Brent Kutzle, Bonnie McKee and Noel Zancanella and produced by Tedder. It also included Brian D'Arcy James' cover of Bob Marley & the Wailers' "Three Little Birds" and Megan Hilty's cover of Sly and the Family Stone's "Dance to the Music". Only the latter was released as a single on iTunes.
