= Tech (Smash) =

- Smash episode
- Episode no.: Season 1 Episode 13
- Directed by: Roxann Dawson
- Written by: Jason Grote and Lakshmi Sundaram
- Original air date: April 30, 2012

Guest appearances
- Uma Thurman as Rebecca Duvall; Leslie Odom, Jr. as Sam Strickland; Thorsten Kaye as Nick; Emory Cohen as Leo Houston; Sean Dugan as Randall Jones; Isiah Whitlock as Ronald Strickland

Episode chronology
| ← Previous "Publicity" | Next → "Previews" |
- Smash (season 1)

"Tech" is the thirteenth episode of the American television series Smash. The episode aired on April 30, 2012.

== Plot ==
The show has moved to the tech phase, with opening night of a three-day run in Boston in only two days. The actor playing Joe DiMaggio drops out for a better gig, so Derek and Eileen want Michael Swift to come back. Julia and Frank have begun to reconcile, and Julia threatens to quit if Michael is rehired. Frank and Leo decide that instead of letting Julia quit, they will come with her to Boston.

Derek tells Ivy he loves her, but then starts up a physical relationship with Rebecca. Ivy finds out immediately, and has to brace herself for not only the emotional heartbreak, but for any professional ramifications.

Dev begins kissing R.J. in a moment of vulnerability, but stops and immediately flies out to see Karen, who has no time for him. At dinner, Dev proposes, and Karen explains she is too busy with tech to even think about marrying him. Later, Dev thinks Karen is partying without him, and the pair fight. Dev tells Karen he kissed R.J. At a bar, Ivy and Dev connect over broken hearts, and end up sleeping together.

Sam's family lives in Boston, so he takes Tom to meet his family. When Sam's father voices his concerns over Sam's career, Tom is sympathetic to the concerns more than Sam is comfortable with.
