= The Music of Smash =

Soundtrack album by Smash cast
- Released: May 1, 2012
- Recorded: 2011–2012
- Genre: Pop
- Label: Columbia
- Producer: Marc Shaiman, Ethan Popp, Andy Zulla, Scott Wittman, Ryan Tedder

Smash cast chronology
The Music of Smash (2012)	Bombshell (2013)

The Music of Smash is the first soundtrack album by the cast of the American musical television series Smash. It was released by Columbia Records on May 1, 2012 and sold 39,000 copies in its first week. As of June 27, 2012, it has sold 112,000 copies.

== Background ==
The album was released in standard and deluxe versions. The standard version featured 13 tracks, consisting of seven covers and six original songs (all written by Marc Shaiman and Scott Wittman, with the exception of "Touch Me", which is written by Ryan Tedder, Brent Kutzle, Bonnie McKee and Noel Zancanella). The version being sold at Target features five bonus tracks for a total of 18.

== Track listing ==
No.	Title	Writer(s)	Original artist	Length
1.	"Touch Me" (featuring Katharine McPhee)	Ryan Tedder, Brent Kutzle, Bonnie McKee, Noel Zancanella	Original composition	3:50
2.	"Stand" (featuring Katharine McPhee and Leslie Odom Jr.)	Donnie McClurkin	Donnie McClurkin	2:57
3.	"Who You Are" (featuring Megan Hilty)	Jessica Cornish, Toby Gad, Shelly Peiken	Jessie J	3:51
4.	"Crazy Dreams" (featuring Megan Hilty)	Carrie Underwood, George Barry Dean, Troy Verges	Carrie Underwood	3:10
5.	"Beautiful" (featuring Katharine McPhee)	Linda Perry	Christina Aguilera	3:32
6.	"Haven't Met You Yet" (featuring Nick Jonas)	Michael Bublé, Alan Chang, Amy Foster-Gilles	Michael Bublé	2:21
7.	"Shake It Out" (featuring Katharine McPhee)	Florence Welch, Paul Epworth	Florence + the Machine	2:48
8.	"Brighter Than the Sun" (featuring Katharine McPhee)	Colbie Caillat, Tedder	Colbie Caillat	2:42
9.	"Let Me Be Your Star" (featuring Katharine McPhee and Megan Hilty)	Marc Shaiman, Scott Wittman	Original composition	3:12
10.	"The 20th Century Fox Mambo" (featuring Katharine McPhee)	Shaiman, Wittman	Original composition	2:39
11.	"Mr. & Mrs. Smith" (featuring Megan Hilty and Will Chase)	Shaiman, Wittman	Original composition	3:35
12.	"Let's Be Bad" (featuring Megan Hilty)	Shaiman, Wittman	Original composition	3:00
13.	"History Is Made at Night" (featuring Megan Hilty and Will Chase)	Shaiman, Wittman	Original composition	4:17

=== Deluxe edition ===
Target Exclusive Tracks
No.	Title	Writer(s)	Original artist	Length
14.	"September Song" (featuring Anjelica Huston)	Kurt Weill, Maxwell Anderson	Knickerbocker Holiday	2:16
15.	"Our Day Will Come" (featuring Katharine McPhee)	Bob Hilliard, Mort Garson	Ruby & the Romantics	2:33
16.	"Everything's Coming Up Roses" (featuring Bernadette Peters)	Stephen Sondheim, Jule Styne	Gypsy: A Musical Fable	2:05
17.	"Breakaway" (featuring Megan Hilty)	Avril Lavigne, Bridget Benenate, Matthew Gerrard	Kelly Clarkson	3:58
18.	"Run" (featuring Katharine McPhee)	Gary Lightbody, Jonathan Quinn, Mark McClelland, Nathan Connolly, Iain Archer	Snow Patrol	3:42

== Charts ==
=== Weekly charts ===
Chart (2012)	Peak position
Canadian Albums (Billboard)	35
French Albums (SNEP)	189
German Albums (Offizielle Top 100)	73
Scottish Albums (OCC)	83
UK Albums (OCC)	73
US Billboard 200	9
US Soundtrack Albums (Billboard)	1

=== Year-end charts ===
Chart (2012)	Position
US Soundtrack Albums (Billboard)	18
