= Savannah Wise =

American actress

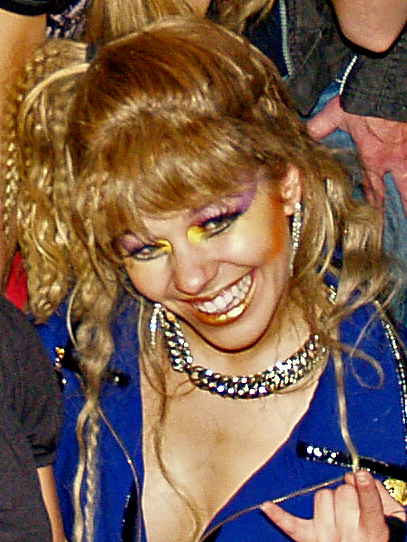
- Wise in costume for the off-Broadway run of Rock of Ages in 2008
- Born: Savannah Wise; April 25, 1984 (age 42)
- Education: University of Cincinnati – College-Conservatory of Music (BA)
- Occupations: Actress, singer and dancer
- Years active: 1992–present
- Father: Scott Wise

Savannah Wise (born April 25, 1984) is an American actress, dancer, and singer. She played Jessica on the NBC American musical theatre dramedy television series Smash. She is also known for her work on Broadway as Evelyn Nesbit in the 2009 revival of Ragtime, originating the role of Waitress #1 and later replacing as Sherrie in Rock of Ages, and as Young Cosette in the original Broadway production of Les Misérables.

== Education ==
Wise earned a degree in dance from the University of Cincinnati – College-Conservatory of Music.

== Career ==
In 2011, Wise landed the lead role of Wanda Clark in the off-Broadway musical Lucky Guy. The show opened on May 19, 2011. Originally set for a 12-week limited engagement, the show closed ten days after its opening on May 29, 2011. An original cast recording was announced and planned but never came to fruition.

Development for Smash (2009) began at Showtime by then-entertainment president Robert Greenblatt, originating from the mind of Steven Spielberg. Wise originally went in to audition for a series regular role, but landed the small role of Jessica, a member of the ensemble in the Marilyn Monroe musical, Bombshell. The role was later expanded from a small guest appearance to a recurring role. Wise appeared as Jessica in 29 of the 32 episodes. The show was cancelled after two seasons.

== Personal life ==
Wise is the daughter of dancer and actor Scott Wise.

== Theatre credits ==
Start year	Production title	Role	Notes
1992	Les Misérables	Young Cosette / Young Éponine (Alternate)	Replacement
2006	Go-Go Beach	Baby	New York Musical Theatre Festival Production
2007	High School Musical on Stage!	Sharpay Evans	Replacement
2009	Rock of Ages	Waitress #1 (u/s Sherrie Christian)	Original Broadway Cast
2009	Rock of Ages	Sherrie Christian	Replacement
2009	Ragtime	Evelyn Nesbit	Original Revival Cast
2011	Lucky Guy	Wanda Clark	Original Off-Broadway Cast

== Filmography ==
=== Film ===
Year	Title	Role	Notes
2012	Courting Habits of the Young Modern Wastrel	Bryn	Short film
2013	A Case of You	Lily	
2014	Sui York	Coco	Short film

=== Television ===
Year	Title	Role	Notes
2007	Law & Order: Criminal Intent	Daphne Seger	Episode: "Players"
2009	Rescue Me	Singing Woman	Episode: "Torch"
2010	Law & Order	Mia	Episode: "Immortal"
2010	Gossip Girl	Rita	Episode: "War at the Roses"
2012	Royal Pains	Rosie Novak	Episode: "After the Fireworks"
2012	Blue Bloods	Holly / Rhonda Lynne Watson	Episode: "Greener Grass"
2013	It Could Be Worse	Heidi	Episode: "He Sounds Like a Girl"
2012–2013	Smash	Jessica	Lead role, 29 episodes

== Discography ==
- 2007: Go-Go Beach (Original Demo Cast Recording)
- 2009: Rock of Ages (Original Broadway Cast Recording)
- 2010: Not Exactly Romeo: A Multi-Media Musical Comedy (Original Demo Cast Recording)
- 2010: Songs from Ragtime (2009 New Broadway Cast Recording EP)
- 2011: The Last Word (Original Demo Cast Recording)
- 2011: Needle in a Haystack – Single (with Kyle Dean Massey)
- 2013: SMASH – The Complete Season One (Music From the NBC Television Series)
- 2013: Bombshell: The New Marilyn Musical from SMASH
- 2015: The Songs of Paul Fujimoto, Vol.1

== Awards and nominations ==
Year	Association	Category	Title of work	Result	Ref.
2010	Fred and Adele Astaire Awards	Outstanding Female Dancer in a Broadway Show	Ragtime	Nominated	
