= The Workshop (Smash) =

- Smash episode
- Episode no.: Season 1 Episode 7
- Directed by: Mimi Leder
- Written by: Jason Grote
- Original air date: March 19, 2012

Guest appearances
- Bernadette Peters as Leigh Conroy; Will Chase as Michael Swift; Neal Bledsoe as John Goodwin; Leslie Odom, Jr. as Sam Strickland; Thorsten Kaye as Nick; Emory Cohen as Leo Houston

Episode chronology
| ← Previous "Chemistry" | Next → "The Coup" |
- Smash (season 1)

"The Workshop" is the seventh episode of the American television series, Smash. The episode aired on March 19, 2012.

== Plot ==
The workshop of Marilyn is finally held. Ivy (Megan Hilty) gets stage fright and slips up, leading Derek to tell her off at intermission, much to the chagrin of Tom. Karen (Katharine McPhee) has the opportunity to meet with a big record exec, but because the meeting is at the same time as the workshop, she decides to do the workshop instead. Julia (Debra Messing) feels guilty about what she and Michael (guest star Will Chase) did, and gives rebuking Michael one more shot.

== Production ==
Recurring guest stars include Will Chase as actor Michael Swift.

Bernadette Peters was announced to guest star on the show on October 11, 2011. She will portray Leigh Conroy, the mother of Megan Hilty's character, Ivy Lynn, who was once a Tony-award winning actress but "now lives vicariously through her daughter". The release also mentioned that Peters will sing in the episode. On March 15, 2012, it was revealed that Peters would sing "Everything's Coming Up Roses" from Gypsy: A Musical Fable, which she previously sang in the 2003 Broadway revival of the musical.

In addition, another version of "Let Me Be Your Star" was heard as well as several other previous numbers heard on the show including "The 20th Century Fox Mambo", "History is Made at Night" and "The National Pastime". It also included a new number performed by Will Chase entitled "On Lexington & 52nd Street". Only "On Lexington & 52nd Street" was made available as a single.
