= Enter Mr. DiMaggio =

- Smash episode
- Episode no.: Season 1 Episode 3
- Directed by: Michael Mayer
- Written by: Theresa Rebeck
- Original air date: February 20, 2012

Guest appearances
- Will Chase as Michael Swift; Becky Ann Baker as Karen's Mother; Dylan Baker as Roger Cartwright; Michael Cristofer as Jerry Rand; Lewis Stadlen as Ralph Masius

Episode chronology
← Previous "The Callback"	Next → "The Cost of Art"
- Smash (season 1)

"Enter Mr. DiMaggio" is the third episode of the American television series, Smash. The episode aired on February 20, 2012.

== Plot ==
While Karen (Katharine McPhee) returns to Iowa to make an important decision about the future, the favorite for the role of Joe DiMaggio—Michael Swift (guest star Will Chase)—is discovered to be holding a secret and Eileen (Anjelica Huston) suspects her soon-to-be-ex-husband is sabotaging the musical by turning potential investors away.

== Production ==
"Enter Mr. DiMaggio" was written by series creator Theresa Rebeck and directed by Michael Mayer. When the pilot was originally written it was for Showtime, but Robert Greenblatt left Showtime for NBC and brought the series with him. Due to the change in networks, Rebeck was forced to remove 20 minutes' worth of material from the pilot episode and put it into the second and third episodes. The episode marks the first appearance of Will Chase, who plays Michael Swift, the favorite for the role of Joe DiMaggio in the musical. He is also an old flame of Julia's.

The Iowa scenes were filmed in Nyack, New York.

Studio recordings of the original song "Mr. & Mrs. Smith" by Megan Hilty and Chase, and the covers of Bruno Mars' "Grenade" by Chase and Gretchen Wilson's "Redneck Woman" by Katharine McPhee were released on iTunes on February 20, 2012.

== Reception ==
=== Ratings ===
The ratings fell significantly for the episode, with only 6.5 million viewers and a 2.3 rating. With the DVR ratings factored in, the episode was viewed with a total of 8.7 million viewers and achieved a 3.2 ratings in 18–49 demographics.

=== Reviews ===
The Huffington Post writer Maureen Ryan complimented the screener copy of the episode, calling it "quite solid", but not equal to the previous two episodes. HitFix writer Daniel Feinberg critically panned the episode, calling it "dreadful" and criticized the Iowa storyline and McPhee's performance of "Redneck Woman" calling it "embarrassing" and "kinda repulsive". He also mentioned that the storyline kept him from enjoying the good parts of the episode.
