= The Callback =

- Smash episode
- Episode no.: Season 1 Episode 2
- Directed by: Michael Mayer
- Written by: Theresa Rebeck
- Original air date: February 13, 2012

Guest appearance
- Michael Cristofer as Jerry Rand

Episode chronology
← Previous "Pilot"	Next → "Enter Mr. DiMaggio"
- Smash (season 1)

"The Callback" is the second episode of the American television series Smash. The episode aired on February 13, 2012. It was written by series creator Theresa Rebeck and directed by Michael Mayer, who also directed the pilot.

== Plot ==
As Ivy Lynn (Megan Hilty) and Karen Cartwright (Katharine McPhee) both attempt to please Derek Wills (Jack Davenport) in order to win the role of Marilyn, Julia Houston (Debra Messing) and her husband Frank (Brian d'Arcy James) become frustrated by the process of their international adoption and Eileen's (Anjelica Huston) acrimonious divorce complicates her attempt to finance the musical. We are shown that Karen in callbacks is very slow to pick up the dance routines, and has problems with acting (Derek tells her she isn't giving him "anything," Marilyn or otherwise). In the end, Ivy wins the role of Marilyn after impressing Derek with her eloquent and vulnerable scenework in callbacks. Derek is moved by Ivy's work to make an advance, and the two become involved.

== Production ==
"The Callback" was written by series creator Theresa Rebeck and directed by Michael Mayer. When the pilot was originally written it was for Showtime, but Robert Greenblatt left Showtime for NBC and brought the series with him. Due to the change in networks, Rebeck was forced to remove 20 minutes' worth of material from the pilot episode and put it into the second and third episodes. This episode featured cameos from two prominent Broadway personalities: Jordan Roth, the president of Jujamcyn Theaters, appeared as himself in the restaurant scene and Tom Kitt, a music arranger, conductor and composer of such works as Next to Normal, appeared as a jazz musician who introduces Ivy and accompanies her on "Crazy Dreams". This is Brian d'Arcy James's first episode as a regular cast member, having previously been listed as a guest star in the pilot.

In an interview with Entertainment Weekly, executive producer Neil Meron revealed McPhee would be covering "Call Me" by Blondie. "20th Century Fox Mambo" was exclusively released to E! Online, while Hilty's cover of the Carrie Underwood song "Crazy Dreams" was released through The Hollywood Reporter. McPhee also revealed to Ryan Seacrest on his radio show, On Air with Ryan Seacrest, that she will also do a song by Florence + the Machine; however, no such song appeared in the episode. Additionally, a different version of "Let Me Be Your Star" from the pilot appeared in the episode. Studio recordings of "Call Me", "The 20th Century Fox Mambo" and "Crazy Dreams" were released as singles, available for digital download.

== Reception ==
=== Ratings ===
"The Callback" originally aired on February 13, 2012. The episode was viewed by 8.06 million viewers and received a 2.8 rating/7% share among adults between the ages of 18 and 49. This means that it was seen by 2.8% of all 18- to 49-year-olds, and 7% of all 18- to 49-year-olds watching television at the time of the broadcast. This marked a 26% drop in the ratings from the previous episode, "Pilot". Despite the significant drop in the ratings, the episode ranked first with demos in its time slot, beating Hawaii Five-0 and Castle. The episode also ranked as the highest-rated performance in the timeslot since April 13, 2009 and helped NBC rank first in the ratings on Monday.

=== Reviews ===
The Huffington Post writer Maureen Ryan heavily praised the screener copy of the episode, calling it "almost as impressive as the first [episode]". She also praised the emotional ending. HitFix reviewer Daniel Feinberg called the episode "fine".
