= The Dress Rehearsal =

- Smash episode
- Episode no.: Season 2 Episode 11
- Directed by: Mimi Leder
- Written by: Julia Brownell
- Production code: 211
- Original air date: April 13, 2013

Guest appearances
- Jesse L. Martin as Scott Nichols; Jamey Sheridan as Richard Francis; Julian Ovenden as Simon; Jaime Cepero as Ellis Boyd; David Call as Adam

Episode chronology
← Previous "The Surprise Party"	Next → "Opening Night"
- Smash (season 2)

"The Dress Rehearal" is the twenty sixth episode of the American television series Smash. It was written by Julia Brownell and directed by Mimi Leder. The episode premiered on NBC on April 13, 2013, the eleventh episode of Season 2. As Tom and Julia race to ready Bombshell for previews, Tom's eagerness to prove himself may not be the best thing for the show. An on-stage mishap forces Ivy to make an important decision, while tension rises at Hit List as Karen becomes suspicious of Derek's motives towards her.

== Plot ==
Tom Levitt (Christian Borle) has a nightmare of being unprepared and naked at the opening of Bombshell, then waking to find Ellis (Jaime Cepero) in bed with him. He then actually awakens, screaming, which brings Julia Houston (Debra Messing) who reminds him that it is the day of the invitation-only dress rehearsal for friends and family.

Ivy Lynn (Megan Hilty) wakes up in bed with Derek Wills (Jack Davenport). She says she wants to keep things between them casual.

Jimmy Collins (Jeremy Jordan) has been up for several days writing new songs for the new material that Kyle Bishop (Andy Mientus) and Julia came up with for Hit List. Karen Cartwright (Katharine McPhee) is worried about him and questions if he took anything stronger than Red Bull and caffeine. He's worried that if he doesn't write new songs for the expanded Diva character, Derek will give some of Karen's songs to the character.

The Bombshell dress rehearsal has multiple technical mistakes. At the end of the "Our Little Secret" number, Simon (Julian Ovenden) as JFK accidentally removes Ivy's slip along with her dress, exposing Ivy's naked body. Producer Eileen Rand (Anjelica Huston) thinks maybe a little nudity will help Bombshell and Tom and Julia feel that it has significant artistic merit. Tom talks to Ivy about it. She's not fully against it but she asks for time to think about it. Eileen wants to cancel the next day's first preview because of all the technical problems, but Tom is afraid he'll be seen as an unfit director. Eileen agrees to let the preview go on as scheduled if Tom can fix all the problems by 3 pm. Ultimately, Tom is successful after Julia comes up with an idea to allow time to set up the prop plane on stage for Act II; the number "Dig Deep" starts in the audience and is performed in front of the stage instead of on it, so the intermission can end while the set is still being moved. During "Our Little Secret," Ivy keeps her slip on; Tom and Julia are disappointed. But in the next scene, where Marilyn objects to JFK leaving her immediately after their tryst, Ivy drops a bedsheet from her body, exposing herself to him when she asks him to stay. The choice is a success.

Sam Strickland (Leslie Odom, Jr.), who was passed over in favor of a different swing when a cast member was injured in the dress rehearsal, tells Tom that he feels Bombshell is a step backwards for him, and that he doesn't want to work for Tom; he leaves the show.

Meanwhile, at Hit List, Jimmy, Karen, and Derek squabble, with Jimmy and Karen afraid that Derek is mad at Karen for turning him down and believe he is threatening to take songs away from her, while Derek is struggling with feeling like he is losing his passion for the show. He talks to Julia about it and she understands since she went through the same thing with Bombshell after she and Michael Swift broke up. She suggests that he tamp down his feelings for Karen and run through the show to find some part of it to be passionate about again. He tells the cast they are doing a run-through before the New York Times critic Richard Francis (Jamey Sheridan) comes to see it later. As they do the run-through, Derek has an idea for a new opening that will present the rest of the show as a flashback. He walks the cast though it, with Ana Vargas (Krysta Rodriguez) as the Diva shooting a victim whose identity is not yet revealed. She sings part of "Broadway, Here I Come" a cappella as she advances with the gun. Karen is upset that Ana has been given her song, which she loves. Even though her character Amanda still sings the full version of the song, Karen argues that it will no longer be Amanda's signature song. Jimmy accuses Derek of punishing them for being together. Scott (Jesse L. Martin) intervenes and asks Kyle for his opinion on Derek's changes and Kyle sides with Derek. Jimmy and Kyle argue about it later, but Kyle tells Jimmy to stop being selfish. Jimmy apologizes and they make up. Ana is excited about her expanded role as the Diva but Karen insensitively tells Ana that Derek only gave her the song because he's upset with Karen, and he'll likely give it back to her later. Ana is upset and tells Karen that she has tried to think of Karen as the star and herself as supporting Karen, but only now realizes that Karen truly feels the same way about their relationship.

After the Bombshell preview, the group is celebrating together and Tom searches the internet for early reviews. He discovers Richard has written a NY Times piece comparing Bombshell to Hit List, in that both pieces being about women reinventing themselves for fame. He says Bombshell's perspective is from the past while Hit List is a modern piece that looks to the future and could itself be Broadway bound. The article also mentions Julia's association with Hit List. Tom, previously unaware of this, becomes livid and storms out of the restaurant. Later, Eileen meets with Richard and tells him she doesn't want to see him right now.

Karen confronts Derek about his behavior, and he tells her what he knows about Jimmy's background, including information that came to light in the course of the Times fact-checking their article: Jimmy uses a false social security number and name, borrowed a large amount of money from him, and is a drug user. Karen later tells Jimmy she wants to know about his life and especially what he hasn't told her. He declines and Karen tells him they are through until he opens up to her.

Ivy finds Derek waiting for her at her apartment and she invites him to stay the night.

As Ana leaves the theater, Jimmy's old drug dealer Adam (David Call) approaches her and claims to be an old friend of Jimmy's; his motives are unclear.

== Production ==
There were four songs featured in the episode, all reprises of original songs. The show's in-house songwriters Marc Shaiman and Scott Wittman wrote the reprised "Let Me Be Your Star", "Our Little Secret", and "Dig Deep", while Joe Iconis wrote the reprised "Broadway, Here I Come".

All four songs were previously released, "Broadway, Here I Come" as a single and the others on the cast album Bombshell.

== Critical reception ==
Hilary Busis of Entertainment Weekly said of the episode, "As the old superstition goes, a bad dress rehearsal all but guarantees a great opening night. And if the opposite also happens to be true, I would keep expectations low for next week's Smash -- because tonight's episode, "The Dress Rehearsal," was season 2's best by far. The main reason: For the most part, its plot focused on backstage intrigue rather than dull relationship drama—and when the latter did intrude upon the former, the result was more than just a bunch of people yelling at each other." Sara Brady of Television Without Pity gave the episode a B− rating.
