= Previews (Smash) =

- Smash episode
- Episode no.: Season 1 Episode 14
- Directed by: Robert Duncan McNeill
- Written by: David Marshall Grant
- Original air date: May 7, 2012

Guest appearances
- Uma Thurman as Rebecca Duvall; Leslie Odom, Jr. as Sam Strickland; Will Chase as Michael Swift; Thorsten Kaye as Nick; Emory Cohen as Leo Houston; Sean Dugan as Randall Jones; Isiah Whitlock, Jr. as Ronald Strickland; Marc Kudisch as Darryl F. Zanuck; Hinton Battle as Preacher

Episode chronology
← Previous "Tech"	Next → "Bombshell"
- Smash (season 1)

"Previews" is the fourteenth episode of the American television series, Smash. The episode aired on May 7, 2012.

== Plot ==
It is opening day of the previews, and there are many kinks to work out.

Ivy (Megan Hilty) wakes up next to Dev (Raza Jaffrey). After the first performance, Karen (Katharine McPhee) introduces Dev to Ivy, and both pretend not to know each other. Dev and Karen make up, and Karen accepts Dev's re-proposal.

Michael Swift (Will Chase) is back, and Julia (Debra Messing) refuses to talk to Tom (Christian Borle) for selling her out. When Michael tries to kiss Julia and gets rejected, Julia confronts Tom and comes to the realization that the two aren't really a team. Sam (Leslie Odom, Jr.) takes Tom and the rest of the company to church. Julia and Tom finally make up after going to church.

At the end of the show, Marilyn dies, and no one claps. Tom, Julia, Derek (Jack Davenport), and Eileen (Anjelica Huston) struggle to figure out a new ending that will end in applause. Rebecca (Uma Thurman) shares her worries about the lack of applause to Karen, and then has her throat close up due to an allergic reaction to peanuts in her smoothie. While Rebecca is in the hospital recovering, there's a chance for both Karen and Ivy to fill in as Marilyn, and for everyone else to speculate who poisoned Rebecca. After she recovers, Rebecca decides she's too scared to continue with the show.

== Production ==
The show's songwriters Marc Shaiman and Scott Wittman made cameo appearances as the restaurant pianist who accompanies Eileen on "September Song" and a bar patron respectively.

== Reception ==
=== Critical reception ===
The A.V. Club gave the episode a B− rating, praising the episode's authentic depiction of an out-of-town preview, but ultimately commenting: "There’s no perspective here on anything, no sense that anyone involved in the show is trying to give us more than a cursory view of a world most of us are unfamiliar with, which makes you wonder, just what the hell the point of all this is."

=== Ratings ===
"Previews" was watched by 5.72 million viewers and received a 1.8 rating and a 5 share among adults 18-49.
