= Pilot (Smash) =

- Smash episode
- Episode no.: Season 1 Episode 1
- Directed by: Michael Mayer
- Story by: Theresa Rebeck
- Teleplay by: Theresa Rebeck
- Original air date: February 6, 2012

Guest appearances
- Brian d'Arcy James as Frank Houston; Becky Ann Baker as Karen's Mother; Dylan Baker as Roger Cartwright; Michael Cristofer as Jerry Rand; Robert LuPone as Jerry's Divorce Lawyer

Episode chronology
← Previous —	Next → "The Callback"
- Smash season 1

"Pilot" is the debut episode for the television series Smash, which premiered on NBC in the United States on February 6, 2012. The episode was written by series creator Theresa Rebeck and was directed by Michael Mayer. The show revolves around a group of characters who come together to put on a Broadway musical based on the life of Marilyn Monroe. The episode featured a mix of original songs and cover songs, the former being written by series composers Marc Shaiman and Scott Wittman.

In the episode, world-renowned songwriting duo Julia Houston (Debra Messing) and Tom Levitt (Christian Borle) are inspired to create a new Broadway musical on the life of Marilyn Monroe—instantly attracting the attention of tenacious producer Eileen Rand (Anjelica Huston) and brilliant yet temperamental director Derek Wills (Jack Davenport). As the four search for their leading lady, veteran actress Ivy Lynn (Megan Hilty) becomes obsessed with winning them over and native Iowan waitress Karen Cartwright (Katharine McPhee) becomes desperate to make her theatrical dreams a reality.

The series received a large amount of promotion before its premiere and several ads were put into the commercial breaks for Super Bowl XLVI which aired on NBC. The episode was also released online before its original American broadcast. The episode was viewed by an estimated 11.44 million viewers and received a 3.8 rating/10 share among adults between the ages of 18 and 49, making it the highest-rated NBC drama series premiere in four years and the third highest new drama debut of the 2011–12 television season. Despite this, viewership between the first and second half-hour dropped, significantly. The episode received positive reviews from critics and was named among the best pilots of the aforesaid television season.

== Plot ==
Noted songwriting duo Julia Houston (Debra Messing) and Tom Levitt (Christian Borle) get inspiration for a new Broadway show after Tom's personal assistant Ellis Tancharoen (Jaime Cepero) reveals his love for Marilyn Monroe. The two decide to cut a demo with Broadway veteran Ivy Lynn (Megan Hilty) which Ellis videotapes. He sends the tape to his mother who uploads it online. Julia and Tom grow angry towards this, fearing that theater critic Michael Riedel will write a harsh review of the song. They decide to fire Ellis, until they learn Riedel loved the song and approved of the idea of a Marilyn Monroe musical. They rehire Ellis and they quickly receive interest from producer Eileen Rand (Anjelica Huston), who brings on director Derek Wills (Jack Davenport), who had a strained relationship with Tom. Derek demands to audition for the main role while Tom wants Ivy to play Marilyn. Meanwhile, a waitress named Karen Cartwright (Katharine McPhee), who came from a small town in Iowa to make her theatrical dreams a reality hears the original demo song and decides to audition. Karen makes a good impression on the producers, leading to both Karen and Ivy getting a callback. Later on, Derek calls Karen to have a meeting at his loft late at night.

At Derek's loft, he tells Karen he needs to see "everything you've got," a come-on that momentarily panics Karen. Derek accuses her of playing the innocent and pretending not to know why she was invited to the director's loft in the middle of the night. She retreats to the bathroom and gathers her nerves. When she comes back, she is in nothing but his shirt and, singing "Happy Birthday, Mr. President" as Marilyn, she climbs into his lap, straddling him, then pulls away and says "not gonna happen". The next day, Karen and Ivy go to their callback singing "Let Me Be Your Star", which closes out the episode.

== Production ==
=== Conception and writing ===
Development began in 2009 at Showtime by then-Showtime entertainment president Robert Greenblatt and Steven Spielberg, from an idea by Spielberg, who had been working on the concept for years. The original concept was that each season would follow the production of a new musical, if any of them were "stage-worthy", Spielberg would make them into an actual Broadway musical. The series was mainly inspired by The West Wing and Upstairs, Downstairs. Spielberg hired Theresa Rebeck to create the series after watching her play, "The Understudy" and receiving a recommendation from executive producers Craig Zadan and Neil Meron. Before the series could be produced, Greenblatt was named chairman of NBC Entertainment after Comcast took control of newly rechristened NBCUniversal. Greenblatt brought the series with him and NBC ordered production of a pilot in January 2011 for the 2011–12 television season. The pilot reportedly cost $7.5 million to produce. The series was then picked up for the first season on May 11, 2011 for 15 episodes.

The pilot episode was written by series creator Theresa Rebeck. She joined the series when it was initially going to be on Showtime. Due to the change in networks, 20 minutes worth of material was taken from the pilot and put into the following episodes, due to the timeslot. Also, the language and explicitness of the show was toned down. While initially coming up with characters, she decided to give some characters two jobs on the musical, for example Derek Wills is both the director and choreographer. This was done in order "to keep the creative team from sprawling" and in order to gain a larger audience. Despite this, she also said she wasn't forced to make the series any more "mainstream".

=== Casting ===
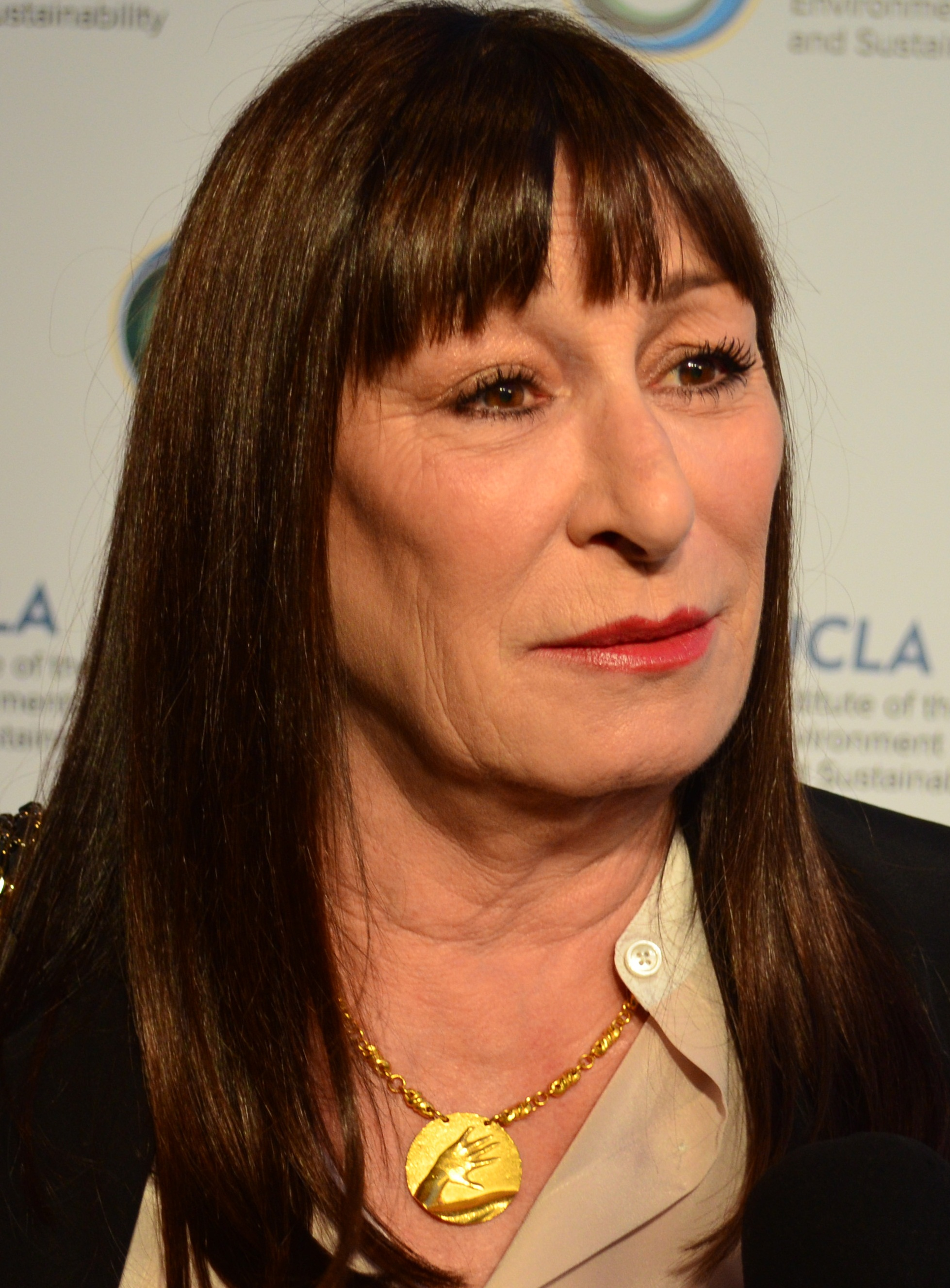
Smash marks Anjelica Huston's first regular television role.

The first cast onto the series was Debra Messing, with her role initially being the lead character, according to Deadline Hollywood. Smash marks the first regular television role for Anjelica Huston, who normally appears in films. She cited, in an interview with The Huffington Post, that the script, the cast and producers for the series were the reason she joined it, saying she'd "be a fool not to participate".

=== Music ===
The episode features both original and cover songs sung on-screen by the characters. The original songs were written by Marc Shaiman and Scott Wittman. Executive producers Zadan and Meron immediately suggested the two composers to the series after signing onto the series. The pilot episode features three original songs ("Never Give All the Heart", "The National Pastime", and "Let Me Be Your Star"), and a cover of Christina Aguilera's "Beautiful", the choice for the latter being used to extend the show's brand to iTunes. Three singles were released from the episode: "Beautiful" sung by McPhee, "The National Pastime" sung by Hilty, and "Let Me Be Your Star" sung by McPhee and Hilty.

== Release ==
=== Pre-broadcast feedback and marketing ===
Before the series had premiered, some media critics stated that the series had potential to become a ratings hit and possibly raise NBC from being the fourth highest-rated network out of five. Greenblatt has also stated that he has high hopes for the series. In order to make it more likely the series will be a success, NBC picked the series up for 15 episodes and opted to hold the show for mid-season in order to pair it up with the hit reality show The Voice on Monday nights. Despite this, other media critics have said unless the series receives a rating above a 3.0 rating in the 18–49 demographic, it will be considered a failure, and only two other NBC series ranked above a 3.0 rating at the time; Fear Factor and The Office. The series has also been put on Monday nights against CBS, with Monday featuring Two and a Half Men, one of the highest-rated shows of the season. Also, musical shows have a known record for failures, like Cop Rock.

NBC used several forms of advertising to promote the series, airing several promos on sister channels like E! and Bravo. There were also several ads for the series during Super Bowl XLVI, which aired on NBC. Due to the already positive buzz surrounding the show, NBC offered early viewings of the pilot on different platforms. For example, from January 15 through January 30, 2012, it was screened on select flights of American Airlines. Also, from January 23 to February 6, 2012, it was also streamed online at NBC.com and hulu. The marketing price has been put as high as $22 million, although NBC Entertainment marking president Len Fogge has denied this, saying it cost less than $10 million.

=== Ratings ===
The pilot episode originally aired on NBC in the United States on February 6, 2012. The episode was seen by 11.44 million viewers and received a 3.8 rating/10 share among adults between the ages of 18 and 49. This means that it was seen by 3.8% of all 18- to 49-year-olds, and 10% of all 18- to 49-year-olds watching television at the time of the broadcast. It initially began with a 4.2 rating, but dropped to a 3.4 rating in the second half-hour. Despite the drop in ratings, the episode ranked first in its timeslot, defeating the CBS police procedural drama, Hawaii Five-0 and the ABC comedy-drama television series, Castle. The episode also ranked as the highest-rated drama series premiere for NBC since Life. It was also the third-highest-rated new drama debut of the 2011–2012 television season, behind Once Upon a Time and Touch, and delivered the biggest 10 p.m. rating of any drama in this television season. The program also had the highest 18-49 rating and viewership for an NBC series in the time-slot since November 2008. "Pilot" was the twelfth most-watched scripted show for the week of broadcast among adults aged 18–49 and seventeenth among overall viewers.

=== Reviews ===
The pilot episode has received positive reviews from critics. Review aggregator Metacritic, which assigns a normalized rating out of 100 of reviews from mainstream critics, calculated a score of 79 based on 32 reviews. In June 2011, Smash was one of eight honorees in the "Most Exciting New Series" category at the Critics' Choice Television Awards, voted by journalists who had seen the pilots. Matt Mitovich of TVLine called the cast "pretty damn perfect" and complimented the musical numbers. Mary McNamara of the Los Angeles Times called the show a "triumph" and also went on to say that the creator Theresa Rebeck as well as her team, "have managed to capture the grand and sweeping gesture that is musical theater and inject it with the immediate intimacy of television". In the Chicago Tribune she also compared the episode to Glee and A Chorus Line. Maureen Ryan of The Huffington Post called it one of the strongest new shows of the season. Another Huffington Post writer Karen Ocamb praised the writing and the creativity of the series. She also complemented the New York City setting of the series saying "you feel as if you're walking down noisy and beloved Times Square with the characters." Tim Goodman from The Hollywood Reporter called the episode an "Excellent, a bar-raiser for broadcast networks" and called it superior to Glee. He also praised writing and acting for the series, comparing it to the quality of a cable television series.

HitFix reviewer Alan Sepinwall complemented the series for its cast and music, but said that he didn't understand the hype towards the series. He also criticized the battle for the main-role of Marilyn for the musical, writing, "the show keeps trying to position Karen and Ivy as equally-deserving of the part, when Hilty very thoroughly outclasses McPhee whenever the production numbers start." Despite this, he called the pilot, "smart and slick", and that he would keep on watching future episodes. He ultimately gave the episode a B. In a podcast with Sepinwall and fellow HitFix writer Dan Feinberg, the two were very negative towards Jaime Cepero's performance as Ellis Tancharoen, with Sepinwall comparing it to a failed version of "All About Eve". They also criticized the writing for Messing's character, Julia Houston and Hilty's character, Ivy Lynn. Entertainment Weekly writer Ken Tucker praised Messing's performance calling her "funny and charming" and a dialed down version of her Will and Grace character Grace Adler. He later went on to criticize the storyline between McPhee and Hilty, believing that Hilty was "obviously superior" to McPhee and that the storyline felt "strained". He also went on to write that he hoped the series became a ratings success. Tanner Stransky, also of Entertainment Weekly, ranked the pilot episode as the 8th best television episode of 2012 saying, "After we watched the subsequent 14 episodes of Smash with a mixture of fascination and dismay (seriously, did Debra Messing's Julia wear a men's pajama top to meet her lover?), it was difficult to recall that the pilot was positively magical. But it was. In fact, that episode-ending performance of Let Me Be Your Star (featuring dueling divas Megan Hilty and Katharine McPhee) was among TV's most watchable and gleeful three minutes of the year. Rare is the series whose high-water mark is its pilot, and Smash is a shining example."

David Wiegand of the San Francisco Chronicle gave the program a rave review and saying that, "[It's so] good you can't help wondering why no one thought of it before, a compelling mix of credible real-life melodrama with a fictionalized approximation of what it takes to get a Broadway show from the idea stage to opening night. Robert Bianco of USA Today wrote that "Unless you're allergic to musicals in general and Broadway in particular, you should find that a compelling central story, a strong cast, an out-of-the-procedural-mold premise and some rousing, roof-raising numbers more than compensate for any lingering problems." He ultimately gave it three and a half stars out of four. The A.V. Club reviewer Noel Murray praised the cast and Eileen's divorce storyline. He mainly criticized the staging and arrangement of the musical numbers saying they threatened the realism of the show and wrote they weren't completely "digetic". He ultimately gave the episode a B. Another A.V. Club reviewer Emily VanDerWerff criticized the series for not avoiding clichés but also wrote "the show is so damned sincere about how much it embraces the clichés of the backstage Broadway story that those inclined to like this sort of thing—and I'm very much one of them—will forgive it some of these excesses." She also criticized the adoption storyline. Despite this, he went on to compare the series to Hill Street Blues, ER and The West Wing.

== Accolades ==
Smash won a 2012 Primetime Emmy Award for Josh Bergasse for choreography. The choreography for "The National Pastime" song in this episode was one of the routines that were part of the show's submission in the Choreography category.
