= Bombshell (Smash album) =

Soundtrack album from the American series Smash

Soundtrack album by Smash cast
- Released: February 12, 2013
- Recorded: 2011–2012
- Genre: Pop
- Label: Columbia
- Producers: Marc Shaiman, Scott M. Riesett

Smash cast chronology
The Music of Smash (2012)	Bombshell (2013)

Bombshell is the second soundtrack album by the cast of the American musical television series Smash. It was released by Columbia Records on February 12, 2013. and sold 16,000 copies in its first week. As of the week ending March 3, 2013, it has sold 26,000 copies.

== Background ==
This is the second album released for the show, the first one being The Music of Smash. It was released by Columbia Records on February 12, 2013. The album was released in standard and deluxe versions. The standard version features 22 songs, all originals, divided into two acts. The deluxe version being sold at Target features an interview with songwriters Marc Shaiman and Scott Wittman, and versions of three of the songs by different singers than on the standard version.

The Soundtrack features songs from both season 1 and season 2. The 22 original songs make up the musical, complete with liner notes detailing the plot of Bombshell. On January 6, 2013 the 22 tracks that would make the final cut were revealed online. Three days later on January 9 the release date of the soundtrack was revealed.

While the original songs from season 1 mostly amounted to Act one numbers only, the majority of the then-unreleased songs made up Act 2, thereby fleshing out the story.

"Mr. & Mrs. Smith" is an original song introduced in the third episode of the first season. It was written by Marc Shaiman and Scott Wittman, but within the show's universe, it was written by the songwriting team of Tom Levitt (Christian Borle) and Julia Houston (Debra Messing) for the Bombshell musical they are working on about Marilyn Monroe. In "Enter Mr. DiMaggio", the setting has Ivy Lynn (Megan Hilty) and Michael Swift (Will Chase) recording the song in a recording studio, while the show cuts away to a fantasy of Lynn and Swift as Marilyn Monroe and Joe DiMaggio singing the song as a ballad in front of an idealized version of a little house with a white picket fence and their desire to be a normal couple without fame. The song is also sung in the fourteenth episode of the first season, Previews, by Swift and Rebecca Duvall (Uma Thurman), and in the fifteenth episode of the season, Bombshell, by Swift and Karen Cartwright (Katharine McPhee). The song was originally released as a single on iTunes and Amazon.com's MP3 story and is currently a track on the cast albums The Music of Smash and Bombshell, with the Hilty and Chase version for the vocals.

== Track listing ==
Act One

No.	Title	Writer(s)	Original artist	Length
1.	"Let Me Be Your Star (Extended Intro)" (featuring Katharine McPhee & Megan Hilty)	Marc Shaiman, Scott Wittman	Original composition	3:43
2.	"At Your Feet" (featuring Bernadette Peters & Sophia Caruso)	Shaiman, Wittman	Original composition	2:44
3.	"Smash!" (featuring Megan Hilty & Katharine McPhee)	Shaiman, Wittman	Original composition	2:15
4.	"Never Give All the Heart" (featuring Katharine McPhee)	Shaiman, Wittman	Original composition	3:11
5.	"The 20th Century Fox Mambo" (featuring Katharine McPhee)	Shaiman, Wittman	Original composition	2:42
6.	"The National Pastime" (featuring Megan Hilty)	Shaiman, Wittman	Original composition	2:33
7.	"History Is Made at Night" (featuring Megan Hilty & Will Chase)	Shaiman, Wittman	Original composition	4:20
8.	"I Never Met a Wolf Who Didn't Love to Howl" (featuring Megan Hilty & Debra Messing, Nick Jonas, Will Chase, Jaime Cepero)	Shaiman, Wittman	Original composition	3:45
9.	"Mr. & Mrs. Smith" (featuring Megan Hilty & Will Chase)	Shaiman, Wittman	Original composition	3:34
10.	"Don't Say Yes Until I Finish Talking" (featuring Christian Borle)	Shaiman, Wittman	Original composition	2:42
11.	"On Lexington & 52nd Street" (featuring Will Chase)	Shaiman, Wittman	Original composition	3:09
12.	"Cut, Print...Moving On" (featuring Katharine McPhee)	Shaiman, Wittman	Original composition	3:06

Act Two

No.	Title	Writer(s)	Original artist	Length
13.	"Public Relations" (featuring Katharine McPhee & Christian Borle)	Shaiman, Wittman	Original composition	2:58
14.	"Dig Deep" (featuring Megan Hilty with Henry Stram, Phillip Spaeth, Wesley Taylor)	Shaiman, Wittman	Original composition	2:36
15.	"Second Hand White Baby Grand" (featuring Megan Hilty)	Shaiman, Wittman	Original composition	4:17
16.	"They Just Keep Moving the Line" (featuring Megan Hilty)	Shaiman, Wittman	Original composition	2:56
17.	"Let's Be Bad" (featuring Megan Hilty)	Shaiman, Wittman	Original composition	3:02
18.	"The Right Regrets" (featuring Debra Messing & Christian Borle)	Shaiman, Wittman	Original composition	2:34
19.	"(Let's Start) Tomorrow Tonight" (featuring Leslie Odom Jr., Christian Borle, Wesley Taylor, Savannah Wise)	Shaiman, Wittman	Original composition	2:55
20.	"Our Little Secret" (featuring Julian Ovenden & Katharine McPhee)	Shaiman, Wittman	Original composition	2:42
21.	"Hang the Moon" (featuring Bernadette Peters & Megan Hilty)	Shaiman, Wittman	Original composition	4:45
22.	"Don't Forget Me" (featuring Katharine McPhee)	Shaiman, Wittman	Original composition	3:14

Target Deluxe Edition (Bonus disc)

No.	Title	Writer(s)	Original artist	Length
1.	"An Interview With the Songwriters" (featuring Marc Shaiman, Scott Wittman)	Shaiman, Wittman	Interview	9:21
2.	"Smash! (Demo)" (featuring Jane Krakowski)	Shaiman, Wittman	Original composition	1:58
3.	"Never Give All the Heart (From Pilot)" (featuring Megan Hilty)	Shaiman, Wittman	Original composition	3:12
4.	"Second Hand White Baby Grand (Demo)" (featuring Christine Ebersole)	Shaiman, Wittman	Original composition	4:16

== Critical reception ==
Professional ratings
Review scores
Source	Rating
Allmusic	4/5 stars

Heather Phares of Allmusic sums up the recording by saying, "even if Bombshell isn't a real Broadway musical, it hits all the notes a production like this should, and showcases the most appealing parts of Smash in the process".

Haley H of StageDoorDish says, "With the perfect combination of new songs and fan favorites, like “History Is Made at Night,” Bombshell will leave you begging for the show to come to Broadway."

Daphne Miller of Idolator said, "With Smash, the campiness makes the generic melodies actually sing, but the flipside is that Bombshell doesn’t have legs when, well, you’re not staring at a great pair of legs."

In their review, "Theatermania.com" praised the performances of Will Chase and Hilty, "complement[ing] each other marvelously on the original songs "Mr. and Mrs. Smith," which they deliver with charmingly romantic delicacy..."

== Charts ==
Chart (2012)	Peak position
U.S. Billboard 200	43
U.S. Billboard Soundtracks	3
