= Emory Cohen =

American actor

- Born: Emory Isaac Cohen; March 13, 1990 (age 36); New York City, U.S.
- Education: University of the Arts
- Occupation: Actor
- Years active: 2008–present

Emory Isaac Cohen (born March 13, 1990) is an American actor. He made his feature film debut in Afterschool (2008). He is best known for his roles as AJ Cross in Derek Cianfrance's film The Place Beyond the Pines (2012), Tony Fiorello in John Crowley's film Brooklyn (2015), and Homer in the Netflix series The OA (2016).

== Early life and education ==
Cohen was born in Manhattan, New York, New York, the only child of Donna (née Ackerman), a director of a preschool, and Noel Cohen, a music teacher. He is Jewish and is a fourth generation New Yorker whose ancestors immigrated from Russia. Cohen made his stage debut as Mr. Peachum in a school production of The Threepenny Opera at the Robert F. Wagner Jr. Secondary School for Arts and Technology, under the direction of Alma Whitney and Oskar Sarasky.

He graduated from Elisabeth Irwin High School in 2008 and received a full scholarship to study acting at the University of the Arts in Philadelphia, Pennsylvania. He trained at UArts for two years before dropping out to study acting in New York.

== Career ==
Cohen made his feature film debut in Afterschool in 2008, opposite Ezra Miller. The film premiered at the 2008 Cannes Film Festival and received positive reviews from critics. His next role was in the 2010 drama film The Hungry Ghosts. In 2012, he co-starred in Derek Cianfrance's crime drama film The Place Beyond the Pines opposite Bradley Cooper and Dane DeHaan. The film received generally positive reviews and was a box office success.

He had a recurring role during the first season of Smash, playing Leo, the son of Debra Messing's character, and starred as Wendell Pierce's lover in the independent film Four.

In 2014, he appeared in the drama The Gambler playing a tennis player and in the independent film Beneath the Harvest Sky. In 2015, he portrayed Tony, the love interest of Eilis, played by Saoirse Ronan, in Brooklyn. Rex Reed praised his "wonderful, warm and deeply touching performance". In Variety, Kristopher Tapley wrote that Brooklyn offered "another reminder that Emory Cohen is one of the most exciting actors of his generation."

Cohen had a leading role in the 2015 independent film Stealing Cars, opposite Felicity Huffman and William H. Macy. He received positive reviews for his role as Billy Wyatt. In 2016, he starred in the Netflix series The OA.

== Filmography ==
=== Film ===
Year	Title	Role	Notes
2008	Afterschool	Trevor	
2008	New York, I Love You	Prom Date	Uncredited
2008	Tess and Nana	Juiceman	Short film
2009	The Hungry Ghosts	Matthew	
2012	Four	June	
2012	The Place Beyond the Pines	Avery "AJ" Cross Jr.	
2012	Nor'easter	Danny Strout	
2013	All Is Bright	Lou	
2013	Beneath the Harvest Sky	Casper	
2014	The Gambler	Dexter	
2015	Brooklyn	Anthony "Tony" Fiorello	
2015	Stealing Cars	Billy Wyatt	
2016	Detour	Johnny Ray	
2016	Vincent N Roxxy	JC	
2016	The Duel	Isaac Brant	
2017	Hot Summer Nights	Dex	
2017	War Machine	Willy Dunne	
2017	Shot Caller	Howie	
2018	Lords of Chaos	Kristian "Varg" Vikernes	
2019	The Wolf Hour	Billy	
2019	Sweetheart	Lucas Griffin	
2019	Killerman	Bobby “Skunk” Santos	
2020	Flashback	Sebastian	
2021	The Birthday Cake	Leo	
2021	Blue Bayou	Denny	
2022	Big Gold Brick	Samuel Liston/Santa (voice)	
2023	American Outlaws	Dylan Dougherty	
2023	The Bikeriders	Cockroach	
2024	Rebel Ridge	Officer Steve Lann	
2025	Roofman	Otis	
2025	Marty Supreme	Ira Mizler	
2027	Possession †		Filming
TBA	Untitled Arkasha Stevenson film †		Post-production

=== Television ===
Year	Title	Role	Notes
2012–2013	Smash	Leo Houston	15 episodes
2016, 2019	The OA	Homer Roberts	13 episodes
2019	The Loudest Voice	Joe Lindsley	3 episodes
2023	Florida Man	Moss Yankov	7 episodes
2025	Only Murders in the Building	Young Lester	Episode: "After You"

== Awards and nominations ==
Year	Award	Category	Work	Result
2012	Los Angeles Film Festival	Best Ensemble Performance in a Narrative Competition	Four	Won
2015	Hamptons International Film Festival	Breakthrough Performer	—N/a	Won
2015	Detroit Film Critics Society	Breakthrough Performance	Brooklyn	Nominated
2015	San Diego Film Critics Society	Breakthrough Artist	Brooklyn	Nominated
2015	New York Film Critics Online	Breakthrough Performer	Brooklyn	Nominated
2016	International Cinephile Society	Best Supporting Actor	Brooklyn	Nominated
