= Scott Wittman =

American director, lyricist and writer

Scott Witman
- Wittman in 2026
- Born: Scott Wittman; November 16, 1954 (age 71)
- Occupations: Lyricist, director, writer

Scott Wittman (born November 16, 1954) is an American director, lyricist, composer, and writer for Broadway, concerts, and television. He is best known for his collaborations with composer Marc Shaiman on works such as Hairspray and Smash. Wittman has received two Tony Awards nominations, winning one, along with two Grammy wins, one Primetime Emmy Award from four nominations, and an Academy Award nomination.

== Life and career ==
Wittman was raised in Nanuet, New York, graduated from Nanuet Senior High School in 1972, and attended Emerson College in Boston for two years before leaving to pursue a career in musical theatre in New York City. While directing shows for Club 57 in the East Village, he began collaborating with songwriter and composer Marc Shaiman, and the two became professional partners. In the 1980s, Wittman also wrote musicals that were performed by downtown figures such as Katy K, Alexis Del Lago, and Holly Woodlawn at the Limelight nightclub in Manhattan. Wittman went on to direct concerts for such artists as Bette Midler, Christine Ebersole, Raquel Welch, Dame Edna Everage, and Lypsinka, among others.

In 2002, Shaiman and Wittman wrote the music and lyrics for the musical Hairspray, which opened on Broadway in that year after a try-out at Seattle's 5th Avenue Theater. The show was an adaptation of the 1989 John Waters film and starred Marissa Jaret Winokur as Tracy Turnblad with Harvey Fierstein as Edna Turnblad. The show was a box office success, selling $1.7 million in tickets on its first day of sales. The production opened to critical acclaim, with specific praise for Wittman and Shaiman's score, with the New York Times claiming it is full of "canny, deliriously tuneful songs." The pair won the Drama Desk Award for Outstanding Lyrics, the Tony Award for Best Original Score, and a Grammy Award. The production also won the 2002 Tony Award for Best Musical, and ran for seven years. In 2011, the musical was performed at Nanuet Senior High School, where Wittman attended high school.

In addition to Hairspray, Wittman conceived, wrote lyrics for, and directed Martin Short: Fame Becomes Me and conceived and directed Matters of the Heart, a solo concert by Patti LuPone in 2000. For the latter, the New York Times praised Wittman's staging, noting "the results are often sublime, occasionally odd and always intriguing."

From 2005 to 2008, Shaiman and Wittman worked on Catch Me If You Can, a musical adaptation of the 2002 Steven Spielberg film, together with Terrence McNally. The production had its regional tryout in 2009 at Seattle's 5th Avenue Theatre, the same theatre where the pair premiered Hairspray. The show opened to generally positive reviews, though some Seattle critics noted it needed work. The musical opened on Broadway in April 2011 to mixed reviews, closing later that year after 32 previews and 170 performances.

In 2010, Wittman's lyrics in original songs for the 82nd Academy Awards was nominated for the Primetime Emmy Award for Outstanding Writing for a Variety Special, marking his first Emmy nomination.

They again worked together on Charlie and the Chocolate Factory the Musical, which premiered in 2013 on the West End at the Theatre Royal Drury Lane to positive reviews. The Guardian called it "a lavish bonanza of a musical", and it was nominated for the 2014 Laurence Olivier Award for Outstanding New Musical. The production was then reworked under new director Jack O'Brien, and opened at the Lunt-Fontanne Theatre on Broadway on April 23, 2017, starring Christian Borle.

In 2013, Wittman and Marc Shaiman co-wrote the score for Bombshell, a musical about Marilyn Monroe within the context of the NBC television show Smash. A soundtrack was released later that same year, and Wittman received his second and third Primetime Emmy Award nominations for Outstanding Original Music and Lyrics for "Let Me Be Your Star" and "Hang the Moon." The former was also nominated for the 2013 Grammy Award for Best Song Written for Visual Media.

Wittman and Shaiman's collaboration transferred to film in 2018, writing nine original songs for Mary Poppins Returns. He and Shaiman were nominated for the Academy Award for Best Original Song for the song "The Place Where Lost Things Go".

In 2021, Wittman and Shaiman wrote a song entitled "Save the City" for the Marvel Cinematic Universe (MCU) in-universe Broadway production, titled Rogers: The Musical featured in the first episode of Hawkeye, "Never Meet Your Heroes". It was released as a single on November 24, the day the episode became available on Disney+.

In 2021, Wittman and Shaiman wrote the music and lyrics for a new musical adaptation of Some Like It Hot, which was set to premiere at the Cadillac Palace Theatre in Chicago, but was cancelled due to the COVID-19 pandemic. It eventually premiered on Broadway in 2022 at the Shubert Theatre, with a book by Amber Ruffin and Matthew Lopez. The production starred J. Harrison Ghee, Christian Borle and Adrianna Hicks, directed by Casey Nicholaw. The show opened to critical acclaim, with Shaiman and Wittman's score garnering praise--Deadline called their work "a modern sensibility that knows what it likes and what it wants to do." The show received 13 2023 Tony Award nominations, including Best Original Score for Wittman and Shaiman and Best Musical, winning four. The show's original cast album won the 2023 Grammy Award for Best Musical Theater Album, Wittman's second win.

In 2023, Wittman and Marc Shaiman wrote original songs, alongside Pasek and Paul for the TV series Only Murders in the Building. Variety called their collaboration an "unforgettable moment," and the four won the 2024 Primetime Emmy Award for Outstanding Original Music and Lyrics for their song, "Which of the Pickwick Triplets Did It?"

== Filmography ==
Year	Title	Role	Notes	Ref.
2002	Greg the Bunny	Main Theme Composer	2 episodes	
2007	Hairspray	Lyricist	Feature film	
2009	63rd Tony Awards	Arranger		
2012	Smash	Lyricist	15 episodes	
2016	Wiener-dog	Lyricist	Feature film	
2016	Hairspray Live!	Lyricist	NBC live taped special	
2018	Mary Poppins Returns	Lyricist	Feature Film	
2020	Bombshell in Concert	Lyricist	Concert film	
2023	Only Murders in the Building	Lyricist, co-writer	Hulu series	

== Stage credits ==
Year	Title	Role	Venue	Ref.
1995	Patti LuPone on Broadway	Director, Conceiver	Broadway, Walter Kerr Theatre	
2000	Matters of the Heart	Director, Conceiver	Broadway, Vivian Beaumont Theatre	
2002	Hairspray	Lyricist	Broadway, Neil Simon Theatre	
2006	Martin Short: Fame Becomes Me	Director, Conceiver, lyricist	Broadway, Bernard B. Jacobs Theatre	
2011	Catch Me If You Can	Lyricist	Broadway, Neil Simon Theatre	
2017	Charlie and the Chocolate Factory	Lyricist	Broadway, Lunt-Fontanne Theatre	
2022	The Music Man	Additional lyrics	Broadway, Winter Garden Theatre	
2022	Some Like It Hot	Lyricist	Broadway, Shubert Theatre	
2025	Smash	Lyricist	Broadway, Imperial Theatre	

== Awards and nominations ==
Award	Year	Category	Work	Result	Ref.
2003	Tony Award	Best Original Score	Hairspray	Won	
2003	Grammy Award	Best Musical Theater Album	Hairspray	Won	
2003	Drama Desk Award	Outstanding Lyrics	Hairspray	Won	
2007	Drama Desk Award	Outstanding Lyrics	Martin Short: Fame Becomes Me	Nominated	
2010	Primetime Emmy Award	Outstanding Writing for a Variety, Music or Comedy Special	82nd Academy Awards	Nominated	
2011	Drama Desk Award	Outstanding Lyrics	Catch Me If You Can	Nominated	
2012	Primetime Emmy Awards	Outstanding Original Music and Lyrics	"Let Me Be Your Star" from Smash	Nominated	
2013	Primetime Emmy Awards	Outstanding Original Music and Lyrics	"Hang the Moon" from Smash	Nominated	
2013	Grammy Award	Best Song Written for Visual Media	"Let Me Be Your Star" from Smash	Nominated	
2018	Academy Awards	Best Original Song	"The Place Where Lost Things Go" from Mary Poppins Returns	Nominated	
2023	Tony Award	Best Original Score	Some Like It Hot	Nominated	
2023	Drama Desk Award	Outstanding Lyrics	Some Like It Hot	Won	
2023	Grammy Award	Best Musical Theater Album	Some Like It Hot	Won	
2024	Primetime Emmy Awards	Outstanding Original Music and Lyrics	"Which Of The Pickwick Triplets Did It?" from Only Murders in the Building	Won	
