= Dancer (disambiguation) =

A dancer is a person who dances.

Dancer(s) may also refer to:

== Film ==
- Dancers (film), a 1987 American film starring Mikhail Baryshnikov
- Dancer (1991 film), a Bollywood film
- Billy Elliot (working title Dancer), a 2000 British film
- Dancer (2005 film), a Tamil film
- Dancer (2016 film), an American documentary film

== Music ==
- "Dancer" (Gino Soccio song), 1979
- "Dancer" (Queen song), 1982
- "Dancer" (Idles song), 2023
- "Dancer", a song by Flo Rida, 2018
- "Dancer", a song by the Michael Schenker Group from Assault Attack, 1982

== People ==
- Dancer (surname)
- Dancer baronets, an Irish title

== Science and technology ==
- Argia, or dancers, a genus of damselflies
- DAnCER (database), a biological database
- Dancer (electric bus), a Lithuanian battery-powered vehicle
- Dancer (software), a web application framework

== Other uses ==
- Dancer (novel), a 2003 novel by Colum McCann
- Dancer, one of Santa Claus's reindeer

== See also ==
- Dance (disambiguation)
- The Dance (disambiguation)
- The Dancer (disambiguation), a list of films
- The Dancers (disambiguation)
