= The Dancers =

The Dancers may refer to:

- The Dancers (play), a 1923 play by Gerald du Maurier and Viola Tree, written under the pen name Hubert Parsons
- The Dancers (1925 film), an American silent adaptation of the play, directed by Emmett J. Flynn
- The Dancers (1930 film), an American adaptation of the play, directed by Chandler Sprague

== See also ==
- Dancer (disambiguation)
- The Dancer (disambiguation)
