= History Is Made at Night (song) =

2012 single from the American TV series, Smash

"History is Made at Night"

Single by Smash cast feat. Megan Hilty & Will Chase

from the album The Music of Smash, Bombshell
- Released: March 12, 2012
- Recorded: 2012
- Genre: Pop
- Length: 4:19 (Album Version)
- Label: Columbia
- Composer: Marc Shaiman
- Lyricists: Marc Shaiman; Scott Wittman
- Producer: Marc Shaiman

Smash cast singles chronology
| ""Mr. & Mrs. Smith"" | "History is Made at Night" | ""I Never Met a Wolf Who Didn't Love to Howl"" |

"History Is Made at Night" is an original song introduced in the fourth episode of the first season of the musical TV series Smash, entitled "The Cost of Art". It was written by Marc Shaiman and Scott Wittman, but within the show's universe, it was written by the songwriting team of Tom Levitt (Christian Borle) and Julia Houston (Debra Messing) for their Marilyn Monroe musical Bombshell.

The song is a duet sung by Marilyn Monroe and Joe DiMaggio. Besides "The Cost of Art", the song is performed various times throughout Season 1, most notably between Ivy Lynn (Megan Hilty) and Michael Swift (Will Chase) in the sixth episode of the season, entitled "Chemistry." The song is also performed as part of a medley in the seventh episode of the season "The Workshop" and Ivy and Dennis begin to sing it in the thirteenth episode "Tech" before they get cut off by a lighting issue.

The song is featured as a track on the cast albums The Music of Smash and Bombshell. The version on the released track is by Megan Hilty and Will Chase, as seen in episode 6.

The song is also covered by the UK band Steps on their album Light Up the World.

== Appearances in the show ==
In episode 4, The Cost of Art, Karen Cartwright (Katharine McPhee) is forced to sit out of "History Is Made at Night" and another workshopped number after Ivy claims she can't hear herself sing. Michael Slezak of TV Line infers that this is due to Ivy's influence over the musical from sleeping with the director, and notes the "downright vicious" smile she gives Karen after she is asked to sit out the numbers. Only snippets of the song are played in this episode.

In episode 6, Chemistry, Julia is shown to have writer's block on "History is Made at Night", due to her personal life (specifically her affair with Michael) impeding on her work. This is the first and only time the song is played in full. The only time the song is paralleled with the show's storyline is in this episode, when it is paired with Julia and Michael's rekindled love affair.

In the 13th episode, "Tech", "History Is Made at Night" begins to be sung, but is cut short due to a lighting issue. Later in the episode, when choreographer Linda calls places for the number, the lights go out, Rebecca Duvall steps out in Marilyn drag and performs "Happy Birthday to You Mr. President".

== Critical reception ==
The song received acclaim from music critics. Peter D. Kramer describes the song as "swingy" and "torchy". In a review of the album The Music of Smash, Andy Propst of TheaterMania says that "[Chase and Hilty] infuse the song's smoky bluesy melody with palpable sexiness". On March 16, 2012, a few days after the 6th episode Chemistry aired, Broadwayworld.com explained that by listening to the "late-50s-styled gem" they "were treated to one of the most memorable and sonically alluring original BOMBSHELL songs to date".
