= Let's Be Bad =

- Smash episode
- Episode no.: Season 1 Episode 5
- Directed by: Jamie Babbit
- Written by: Julie Rottenberg and Elisa Zuritsky
- Original air date: March 5, 2012

Guest appearances
- Neal Bledsoe as John Goodwin; Will Chase as Michael Swift; Leslie Odom, Jr. as Sam Strickland; Emory Cohen as Leo Houston; Charlie Semine as Mr. Denby; Nitya Vidyasagar as Jill Abrams

Episode chronology
← Previous "The Cost of Art"	Next → "Chemistry"
- Smash (season 1)

"Let's Be Bad" is the fifth episode of the American television series, Smash. The episode aired on March 5, 2012.

== Plot ==
Karen (Katharine McPhee) performs at a government party; tensions between Michael (guest star Will Chase) and Julia (Debra Messing) increase; Eileen (Anjelica Huston) becomes associated with Ellis (Jamie Cepero); Ivy's (Megan Hilty) romantic relationship with Derek (Jack Davenport) hits a bump in the road.

== Production ==
Recurring guest stars include Neal Bledsoe as Tom's boyfriend John Goodwin, Will Chase as actor Michael Swift, Leslie Odom, Jr. as Ivy's ensemble friend Sam Strickland, and Emory Cohen as Julia and Frank's son Leo Houston.

Among the songs appearing in the episode are the original title number from the episode performed by Megan Hilty and the cast of Marilyn, Katharine McPhee's cover of James Brown's "It's a Man's Man's Man's World" and Donny Hathaway's "A Song for You" performed by Chase. All three songs were released as singles on March 5, 2012.

== Ratings ==
The episode saw a 17% increase in ratings from the previous week. It had an 18-49 rating of 2.7/7 and was seen by 7.76 million viewers and was first in its timeslot. With the Live+7 DVR viewing added, the episode was seen with a total of 10.22 million viewers and achieved a 3.8 rating in 18-49 demographics.

== Accolades ==
Smash won a 2012 Primetime Emmy Award for Josh Bergasse for choreography. The choreography for the song "Lets Be Bad"'s performance was one of the routines that were part of the show's submission in the Choreography category.
