= History Is Made at Night =

History Is Made at Night may refer to:

- History Is Made at Night (1937 film)
- History Is Made at Night (1999 film)
- History Is Made at Night (song), a song from the musical TV series Smash
