= I Never Met a Wolf Who Didn't Love to Howl =

2012 Single from the American TV series, Smash

Single by Megan Hilty feat. Debra Messing, Nick Jonas, Jaime Cepero & Will Chase

from the album Bombshell
- Released: February 27, 2012
- Recorded: 2012
- Genre: Pop
- Length: 3:44 (Album Version)
- Label: Columbia
- Composer(s): Marc Shaiman
- Lyricist(s): Marc Shaiman; Scott Wittman
- Producer(s): Marc Shaiman

Smash cast singles chronology
""History Is Made at Night""	"I Never Met a Wolf Who Didn't Love to Howl"	""Touch Me""

"I Never Met a Wolf Who Didn't Love to Howl" is an original song introduced in the fourth episode of the musical TV series Smash, entitled "The Cost of Art". The song is written by Marc Shaiman and Scott Wittman, but in the show's universe, it was written by the songwriting duo Tom Levitt (Christian Borle) and Julia Houston (Debra Messing) for their Marilyn Monroe musical Bombshell.

In "The Cost of Art", the song is performed first by Ivy Lynn (Megan Hilty) in the rehearsal room. Later, at a birthday party Derek Wills (Jack Davenport) is throwing for old friend and protege Lyle West (Nick Jonas), producer Eileen Rand (Anjelica Huston) asks Ivy to perform the song in order to entice Lyle to invest in Bombshell. Ivy performs the song, with the help of Julia, Ellis Boyd (Jaime Cepero), Michael Swift (Will Chase), and Lyle, in front of Lyle's guests.

The song is reprised in the fifteenth episode of Season 1, "Bombshell", by Karen Cartwright (Katharine McPhee), the ultimate choice for Marilyn, as another full choreographed number that Karen rehearses with the male members of the ensemble in preparation for opening night of the show's Boston previews.

The song was initially released as a single on iTunes and Amazon.com's MP3 store and is currently available on the cast album Bombshell, with Hilty and the cast members' vocals from "The Cost of Art" on the track.

== Production ==
An excerpt is sung in the rehearsal room where Ivy stops it because she cannot hear herself over Karen (Katharine McPhee), who is singing too loud. After lunch they try again, and again Karen is still too loud. Later in the episode, the full version is sung at Lyle's house on at birthday party as a taster for him, a possible sponsor who will not invest until he has seen a performance. Lyle joins in at the end with electric guitar and vocals.

The Karen Cartwright version features the fully staged version of the song in the context of the musical in which it represents Marilyn Monroe visiting American troops in Korea in 1954. As such, the lyrics are modified from the original version (which alluded to investors investing money) to better suit the military theme.

== Critical reception ==
Ken Tucker's TV described it as "a fine performance, a boop-boop-a-doopin [song, which was sung in] a manner that would indeed make at the least a cartoon wolf as designed by Tex Avery howl". Tizzys Art comments that the number was "simply a lot of fun to watch on its own". Starpulse.com describes the song as "a snappy number". ES Updates describes the song as episode four's "big musical number" and "a standard Marilyn sexpot song with a twist". They are pleased that the writers have remembered that as well as being sexy and sad, "Marilyn Monroe was also FUNNY", and that "the willingness to flirt with humor and fun" in this number was a good move. The A.V. Club describes the performance as "a sexy showstopper about how Marilyn Monroe realized her power over men once she began developing curves". The review adds however that as opposed to the "split between the real world and the Dream Theater" that took place in previous numbers, this song "seems to exist somewhere between [the two worlds], like something from an old Hollywood musical, in which people who’ve never even heard a song are suddenly dancing, singing, and playing along with it". It concludes by saying Howl is a "fine number", although concedes that the staging is rather odd. Emily Gagne of TV Guide said that Megan Hilty "both cooed and killed [her] new favourite Smash song" which she described as a "bombastic big bang track".

In a discussion of how the setups surrounding such Smash numbers seem very unrealistic, Crushable questions whether "the writers and assistants [would] really be acting as Ivy’s backup when she wooed Nick Jonas['s character] with "I Never Met a Wolf Who Didn't Love to Howl". Metro also comments on the absurdity of inviting Ellis (who is just an assistant) to join in on the song, and questions whether the fact that they did not cut away to a fully staged version was due to "[director] Mr. [Michael] Grant [or writer] Mr. [David Marshall] Morris [wanting to] switch things up". However, the site describes the number as "terribly fun!"

== Release history ==
Region	Date	Format	Label
Canada	February 27, 2012	Digital download - Digital Single	Columbia Records
United States	February 27, 2012	Digital download - Digital Single	Columbia Records
United States	March 6, 2012	Digital download - Digital Single	Columbia Records
United States	February 12, 2013	Digital download - Digital Album	Columbia Records
