= Chemistry (Smash) =

- Smash episode
- Episode no.: Season 1 Episode 6
- Directed by: Dan Attias
- Written by: Jacquelyn Reingold
- Original air date: March 12, 2012

Guest appearances
- Neal Bledsoe as John Goodwin; Will Chase as Michael Swift; Leslie Odom, Jr. as Sam Strickland; Thorsten Kaye as Nick; Emory Cohen as Leo Houston; Geoff Cantor as Bobby Raskin

Episode chronology
← Previous "Let's Be Bad"	Next → "The Workshop"
- Smash (season 1)

"Chemistry" is the sixth episode of the American television series, Smash. The episode aired on March 12, 2012.

== Plot ==
Ivy (Megan Hilty) comes down with laryngitis, Julia (Debra Messing) keeps bumping into Michael (guest star Will Chase), Eileen (Anjelica Huston) and Ellis (Jamie Cepero) talk at a bar, Karen (Katharine McPhee) performs for a bar mitzvah.

== Production ==
Recurring guest stars include Will Chase as actor Michael Swift.

One of the cover songs already announced is "Shake It Out" by Florence + the Machine performed by Katharine McPhee. Additionally, "History is Made at Night" performed by Megan Hilty, Chase and the cast of Marilyn will make a reappearance in this episode, having first been heard in the episode "The Cost of Art", and Hilty's solo version of "Let Me Be Your Star" first heard in the pilot will be heard in the episode. Also, Hilty's version of Jessie J's "Who You Are" was also in the episode. Only "History is Made at Night" was made available as a single on iTunes.
