= Dancer (surname) =

Dancer is a surname. Notable people with the surname include:

- Eric Dancer (born 1940), Lord-Lieutenant of Devon 1998–2015
- Barry Dancer (born 1952), Australian former field hockey player
- Daniel Dancer (1716–1794), English miser
- David Dancer (1896–1982), American politician
- Edward Norman Dancer (born 1946), Australian mathematician
- Faye Dancer (1925–2002), player in the All-American Girls Professional Baseball League
- John Benjamin Dancer (1812–1887), scientific instrument maker and inventor of microphotography
- Ronald S. Dancer (1949–2022), American politician
- Stanley Dancer (1927–2005), American harness racing driver and trainer
- Thomas Dancer (c.1750–1811), British physician and botanist
