= The Dancer =

The Dancer may refer to:

- The Dancer (1915 film), a German silent drama film
- The Dancer (1919 film), a German silent film
- The Dancer (1943 film), a Czech historical romantic drama film
- The Dancer (2000 film), an English-language French drama film
- The Dancer (2011 film), an Indonesian film
- The Dancer (2016 film), a French biographical historical drama film
- "The Dancer", a song from PJ Harvey's 1995 album To Bring You My Love

== See also ==
- Dance (disambiguation)
- Dancer (disambiguation)
- The Dancers (disambiguation)
