= It's a Wonderful Life (play) =

Stage play by Joe Landry

It's a Wonderful Life: A Live Radio Play
- Original language: English
- Written by: Joe Landry
- Characters: Jake Laurents; Sally Applewhite; Harry Heywood/Paul Andrews; Freddie Filmore; Lana Sherwood; Stage Manager
- Genre: Drama
- Setting: Studio A, WBFR Radio Station 1946, Manhatthan, New York.

Premiere
- Date: 1996
- Place: Stamford Center for the Arts, U.S.

It's a Wonderful Life: A Live Radio Play is a stage play written by American playwright Joe Landry. The play is an adaptation of the 1946 film It's a Wonderful Life written by Frank Capra, Frances Goodrich, Albert Hackett, and Jo Swerling, which was based on The Greatest Gift by Philip Van Doren Stern. The play has received critical praise and has been cited as one of the most produced plays in the United States, popular with schools and community theatres.

The play is set at the fictional WBFR radio station in Manhattan, New York, with a small group of actors playing multiple roles from the story using sound affects and props. The play had its Broadway debut on November 4, 2026 at the Broadhurst Theatre.

== Synopsis ==
In 1946, a small band of actors gather on Christmas Eve to perform the story It's a Wonderful Life live on the set of the WBFR radio station broadcast from Manhatthan, New York.

== Original cast and characters ==
Character	Broadway (2026)
Jake Laurents as George Bailey & Others	Andrew Rannells
Sally Applewhite as Mary Hatch Bailey & Others	Megan Hilty
Paul Andrews (Note: Character was originally named "Harry 'Jazzbo' Heywood", but was renamed for Broadway.) as Clarence Odbody & Others	Tituss Burgess
Freddie Filmore as Mr. Potter & Others	Harry Hamlin
Lana Sherwood as Violet Bick & Others	Lisa Rinna
The Stage Manager / Foley Artist	Leslie Bloome

== Production history ==
The play was first performed at the Stamford Center for the Arts in 1996. Playwright Joe Landry adapted the story into two versions, a 90-minute and 40-minute version. Landry had initially adapted the story into a traditional full length play, however he was told it would be too hard to produce, requiring over 25 actors and a large budget. Inspired by Woody Allen's film Radio Days, Landry rewrote his script to be set at a radio station, with actors playing multiple roles and only needing one set design space. Most of the original production crew were members of the acting company he founded, the Second Guess Theatre Company.

The show has become a staple of holiday entertainment in Chicago, first started by the American Theatre Company (now the American Blues Theater Company) who have produced it yearly since 2002. The Chicago production was directed by Marty Higginbotham.

=== Broadway (2026) ===
The play premiered on Broadway in 2026, directed by Jerry Zaks. Previews began November 4, 2026 at the Broadhurst Theatre, and opened on November 18. The play is set for a limited run to end January 3, 2027 and stars Megan Hilty, Andrew Rannells, Titus Burgess, Harry Hamlin, and Lisa Rinna.
