= The Dancers (1925 film) =

1925 film by Emmett J. Flynn

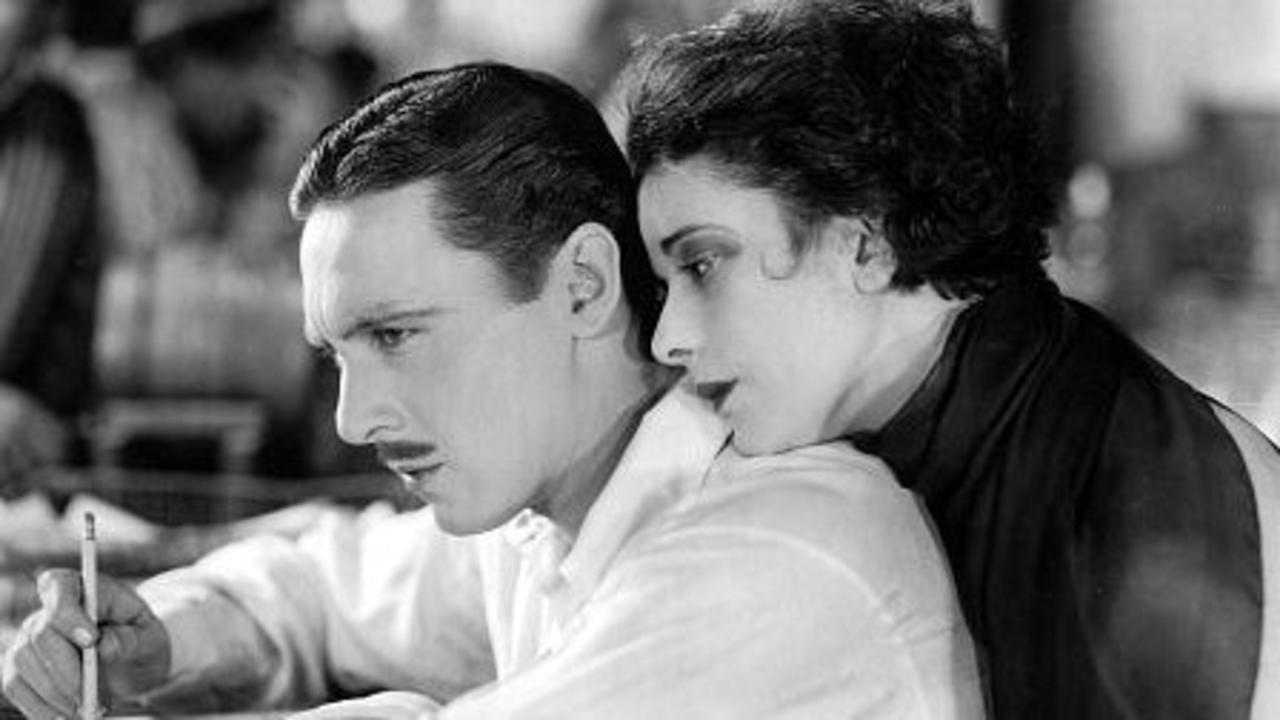
- Still with George O'Brien and Alma Rubens
- Directed by: Emmett J. Flynn
- Written by: Edmund Goulding
- Based on: The Dancers by Gerald du Maurier and Viola Tree
- Produced by: William Fox
- Starring: George O'Brien; Alma Rubens; Madge Bellamy
- Cinematography: Paul Ivano; Ernest Palmer
- Production company: Fox Film Corp.
- Distributed by: Fox Film Corp.
- Release date: January 4, 1925
- Running time: 70 minutes
- Country: United States
- Language: Silent (English intertitles)

The Dancers is a 1925 American silent drama film directed by Emmett J. Flynn and starring George O'Brien, Alma Rubens, and Madge Bellamy. It is an adaptation of the 1923 play The Dancers by Viola Tree and Gerald du Maurier. It was remade by Fox Film five years later as a sound film The Dancers.

== Plot ==
As described in a review in a film magazine, Tony (O'Brien) and Una (Bellamy) are childhood sweethearts in England and vow to marry when they grow up. Tony leaves to make his fortune in South America and finally becomes the owner of a saloon and dance hall in Argentina. Tango dancer Maxine (Rubens), who works in the dance hall, falls in love with him, and he is attracted to her, but the memory of his childhood sweetheart is always before him and he remains true to her. Una grows up as a devotee of jazz and wild parties and forgets about Tony. Her life is one continual round of dancing and drinking. One night she is taunting Evan (Wood), an easy-going sweetheart, and are then are giving way in a moment of passion brought on by the madness of dancing and Champaign. When Tony's uncle, he inherits his wealth and title, so he returns to London to claim Una. Una's aunt persuades her to keep her secrets, and Una prepares for the wedding. When Tony tells her of how he has remained true to her, she becomes near-hysterical as she realizes what her folly has led to. While the wedding crowd is waiting at the church, she realizes she cannot go through with it. Una confesses her transgression to Tony and he forgives her, but she has taken poison and dies. Tony finally wanders back to his old place in Argentina and finds solace in marrying Maxine.

== Cast ==
- George O'Brien as Tony
- Alma Rubens as Maxine
- Madge Bellamy as Una
- Templar Saxe as Fothering
- Joan Standing as Pringle
- Alice Hollister as Mrs. Mayne
- Freeman Wood as Evan Caruthers
- Walter McGrail as The Argentine
- Noble Johnson as Ponfilo
- Tippy Grey as Captain Bassil

== Preservation ==
Prints of The Dancers are in the collections of the Museum of Modern Art and George Eastman Museum, and the film has been released on DVD.

== Bibliography ==
- Matthew Kennedy. Edmund Goulding's Dark Victory: Hollywood's Genius Bad Boy. Terrace Books, 2004.
