= Dancer (electric bus) =

Electric bus produced in Lithuania

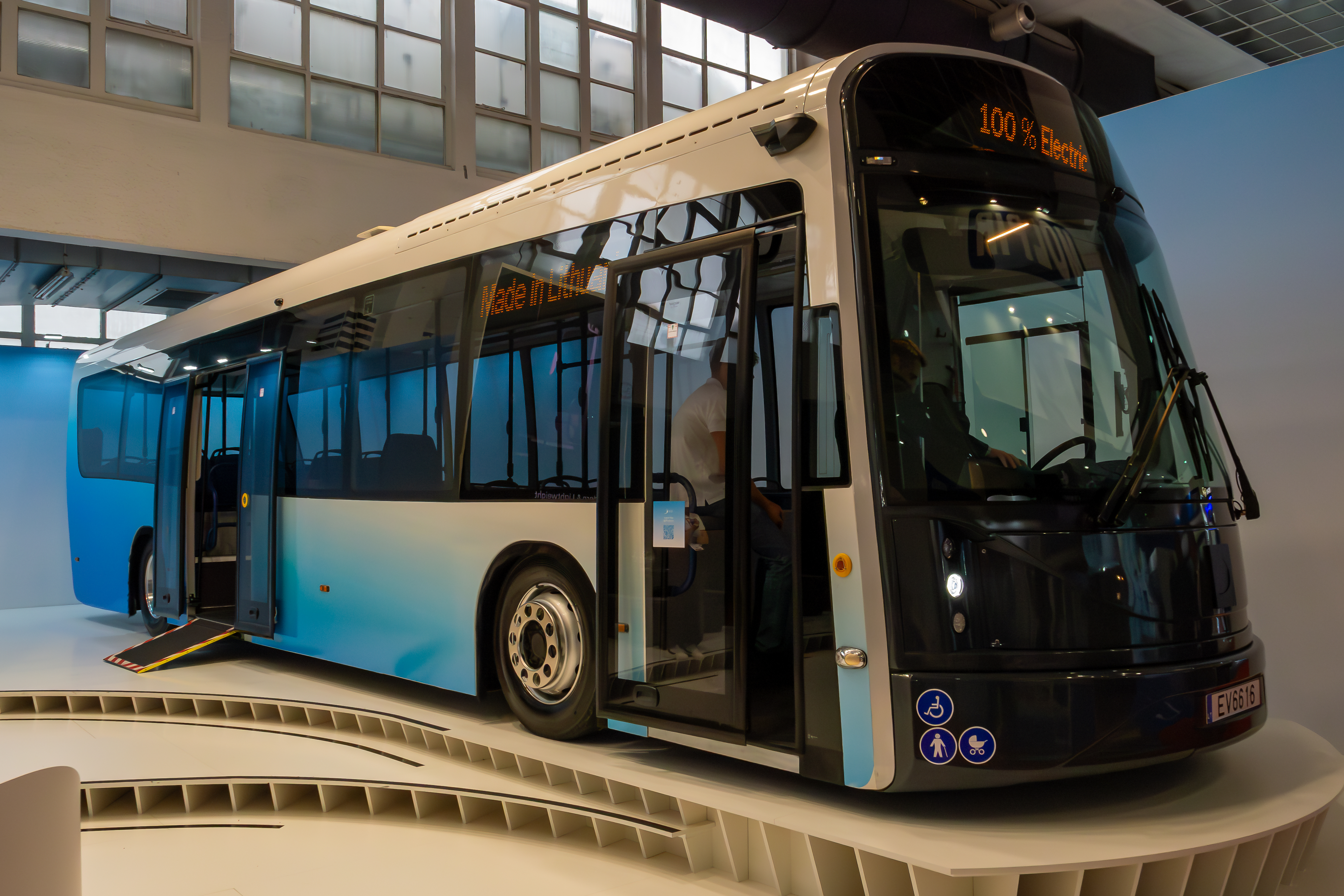
Dancer bus on display at Busworld Europe 2023

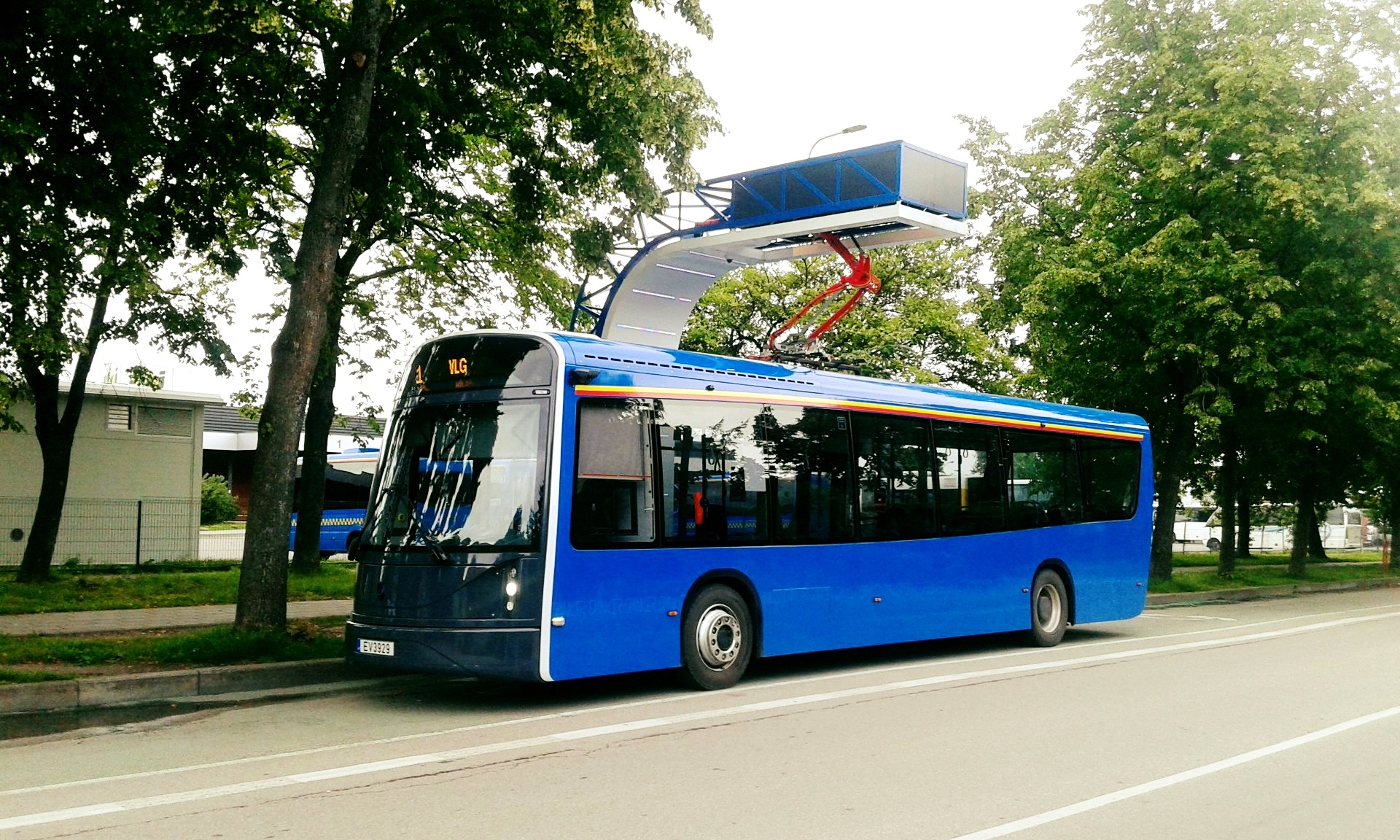
Dancer bus charging in Klaipėda

Dancer Bus is an electric bus designed and produced by Vėjo Projektai UAB in Klaipėda, Lithuania. The electric bus is manufactured of composite materials, including recycled PET bottles. The vehicle is 12 metres (39 ft) long, equipped ZF electric drive. In-wheel traction motors are currently in development. Fully charged bus can ride a distance of up to 90 kilometres (56 mi). The lithium-titanate battery fully charges in less than 10 minutes. The capacity is 93 passengers with 32 seats and one space for a wheelchair. The bus is certified in the European Union. In April 2020, two buses were purchased by the Klaipėda City Municipality to be used for public transportation.

== Sources ==
- Dancer Bus specifications
