= The Cost of Art =

- Smash episode
- Episode no.: Season 1 Episode 4
- Directed by: Michael Morris
- Written by: David Marshall Grant
- Original air date: February 27, 2012

Guest appearances
- Nick Jonas as Lyle West; Neal Bledsoe as John Goodwin; Will Chase as Michael Swift; Eisa Davis as Abigail; Leslie Odom, Jr. as Sam Strickland

Episode chronology
← Previous "Enter Mr. DiMaggio"	Next → "Let's Be Bad"
- Smash (season 1)

"The Cost of Art" is the fourth episode of the American television series, Smash. The episode aired on February 27, 2012.

== Plot ==
When Derek (Jack Davenport) hosts a party for young teen star Lyle West (guest star Nick Jonas), Eileen (Anjelica Huston) seizes the opportunity to try a new strategy for raising funds. Karen (Katharine McPhee) learns how to increase her chances of success in the high-stakes world of Broadway and Tom (Christian Borle) goes on a special first date.

== Production ==
Nick Jonas was announced to guest star on the show on October 11, 2011. His character of Lyle West is described as "a hot sitcom star who started his career as a child actor in a Broadway show written by Tom (Christian Borle) and directed by Derek (Jack Davenport)." The release also mentioned that Jonas will sing in the episode.

Two cover songs and two originals are featured in the episode. Katharine McPhee performs Adele's "Rumour Has It" and Jonas performs "Haven't Met You Yet", which was originally sung by Michael Bublé. In addition, two original songs from Marilyn featured in the episode include "History is Made at Night" performed by Megan Hilty and the ensemble and "I Never Met a Wolf Who Didn't Love to Howl", also performed by Hilty. Additionally, snippets of "The 20th Century Fox Mambo" from "The Callback" and "Let's Be Bad" from the then upcoming episode of the same name could be heard in some of the rehearsal scenes. On February 27, only "Haven't Met You Yet" and "I Never Met a Wolf Who Didn't Love to Howl" were released as singles.

== Reception ==
=== Ratings ===
Ratings for this episode were on par with the previous week's episode. It achieved 2.3 18–49 rating, but viewership increased from 6.5 million viewers to 6.6 viewers. Including the DVR ratings, the episode was viewed with a total of 3.4 ratings in 18–49 demographics and 9.05 million viewers.

=== Critical response ===
The episode received positive reviews from critics. Robert Bianco of USA Today called it the "best episode since [the series]' pilot". Maddie Furlong of The Huffington Post said the episode contained "just the right amount of momentum to get the story going again and a dash of over-the-top attitude." TV Guide's Damian Holbrook especially praised Karen's storyline.
