= The Dancers (play) =

1923 play

- Original language: English
- Written by: Gerald du Maurier; Viola Tree
- Genre: Drama

Premiere
- Date: 15 February 1923
- Place: Wyndham's Theatre, London

The Dancers is a 1923 play by Gerald du Maurier and Viola Tree, written under the pen name Hubert Parsons.

It ran for 349 performances at Wyndham's Theatre in London's West End, starring du Maurier himself alongside Tallulah Bankhead in her London debut. The cast also included Nigel Bruce, Jack Hobbs, William Fay and Lilian Braithwaite. It subsequently transferred to the Broadhurst Theatre on Broadway, where it lasted for 133 performances. The New York production starred Richard Bennett, with Pat Somerset.

== Adaptations ==
It was twice adapted for the screen by Fox Film. In 1925 a silent film The Dancers was made, followed by a 1930 sound remake.

== Bibliography ==
- Goble, Alan. The Complete Index to Literary Sources in Film. Walter de Gruyter, 1999.
- Kellow, Brian. The Bennetts: An Acting Family. University Press of Kentucky, 2004.
- Wearing, J. P. The London Stage 1920-1929: A Calendar of Productions, Performers, and Personnel. Rowman & Littlefield, 2014.
