= DAnCER (database) =

Content
- Description: disease-annotated chromatin epigenetics resource.

Contact
- Research center: University of Toronto, Toronto, Ontario, Canada
- Laboratory: Hospital for Sick Children, Wodak Lab
- Authors: Andrei L Turinsky
- Primary citation: Turinsky & al. (2011)
- Release date: 2010

Access
- Website: http://wodaklab.org/dancer/

DAnCER (disease-annotated chromatin epigenetics resource) is a database for chromatin modifications and their relation to human disease.

It was developed by the Wodak Lab at the Hospital for Sick Children.

It has been developed to serve as the core bioinformatics resource for seven experimental and bioinformatics laboratories working together to unravel the mechanisms of chromatin modifications and their relation to human disease. Since molecular networks are essential to the understanding of biological processes, this research effort strives to explore CM-related genes in the full context of protein complexes, gene-expression regulation and pathways. To gain additional insights into the CM process in human cells, it also explores patterns of evolutionary conservation across model organisms - from sequence, domain composition and 3D structure, to interaction patterns and regulatory mechanisms.

== See also ==
- Epigenomics
- chromatin
