= Dancer baronets =

Extinct baronetcy in the Baronetage of Ireland

The Dancer Baronetcy, of Modreeny in the County of Waterford, was a title in the Baronetage of Ireland. It was created on 12 August 1662 for Thomas Dancer. The title became extinct on the death of the seventh Baronet in 1933.

== Dancer baronets, of Modreeny (1662) ==
- Sir Thomas Dancer, 1st Baronet (died 1689)
- Sir Thomas Dancer, 2nd Baronet (died 1703)
- Sir Loftus Dancer, 3rd Baronet (died 1734)
- Sir Thomas Dancer, 4th Baronet (c. 1699–1776)
- Sir Amyrald Dancer, 5th Baronet (1768–1843)
- Sir Thomas Bernard Going Dancer, 6th Baronet (1806–1872)
- Sir Thomas Johnston Dancer, 7th Baronet (1852–1933)
