= Thomas Dancer =

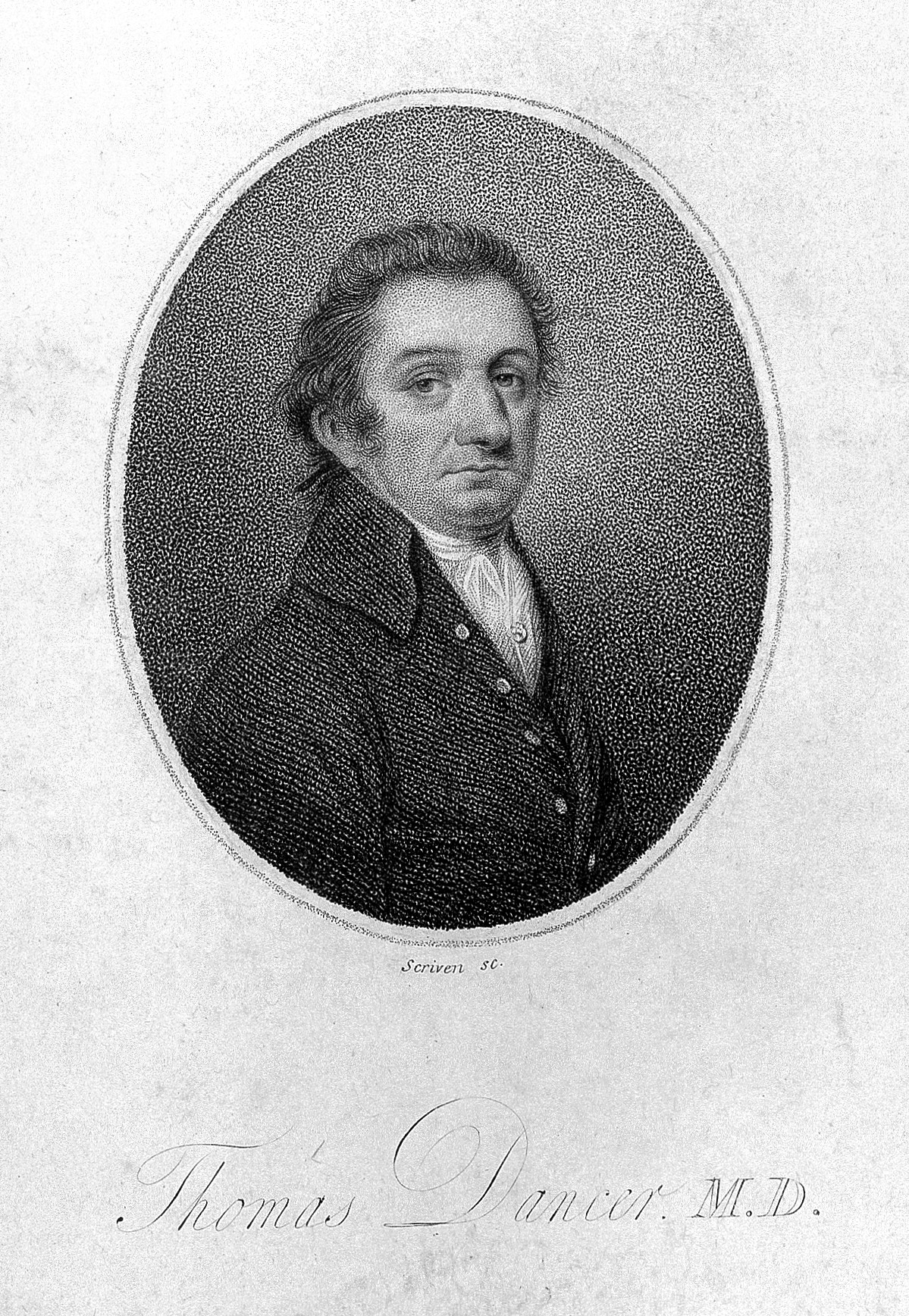
Thomas Dancer

Thomas Dancer (c. 1750–1811) was a British physician and colonial botanist.

== Life ==
Dancer graduated M.D. at Edinburgh University in 1771. He came to Jamaica in 1773, and was curator of its botanic garden from 1787 to 1804.

In touch with Sir Joseph Banks, Dancer received an award in 1791 to encourage his work on plants of economic value. When the plant collection from the Second Breadfruit Voyage of William Bligh came to Jamaica in 1793, Dancer and Arthur Broughton added specimens for Banks to it, and Dancer provided documentation.

Dancer died in Kingston, Jamaica on 1 August 1811.

== Works ==
- A Brief History of the Late Expedition Against Fort San Juan (1781), on the San Juan Expedition (1780)
- Catalogue of Plants, Exotic and Indigenous, in the Botanical Garden (1792)
- Medical Assistant, or, Jamaica Practice of Physic (1801)
- A Rowland for an Oliver, or, A Jamaica Review of the Edinburgh Reviewers (1809)
