= The Dancers (1930 film) =

1930 film

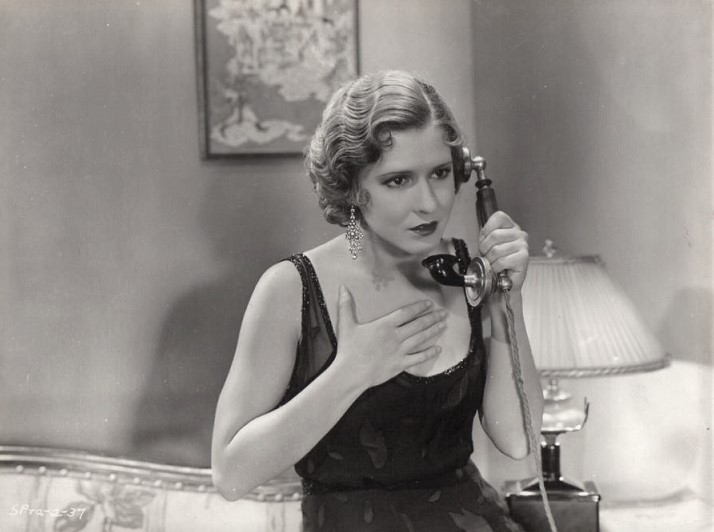
- Mae Clarke in The Dancers
- Directed by: Chandler Sprague
- Screenplay by: Edwin Burke
- Based on: The Dancers by Gerald du Maurier and Viola Tree
- Produced by: Fox Film Corporation
- Starring: Lois Moran; Phillips Holmes; Mae Clarke; Mrs. Patrick Campbell
- Cinematography: Arthur L. Todd
- Edited by: Alex Troffey
- Music by: Hugo Friedhofer; Jean Talbot
- Distributed by: Fox Film Corporation
- Release date: November 8, 1930
- Running time: 70 minutes
- Country: United States
- Language: English

The Dancers is a 1930 American pre-Code melodrama, produced and distributed by Fox Film Corporation, and directed by Chandler Sprague. It is based on a 1923 West End play of the same title by Viola Tree and Gerald du Maurier. The film marks the feature sound film debut of actress Mrs. Patrick Campbell. The setting was shifted from the play's South America to Canada.

== Cast ==
- Lois Moran - Diana
- Phillips Holmes - Tony
- Walter Byron - Berwin
- Mae Clarke - Maxine
- Tyrell Davis - Archie
- Mrs. Patrick Campbell - Aunt Emily

== Plot ==
Leaving London, Tony goes to Canada and becomes the owner of a dance hall. Dancer Maxine falls in love. Tony becomes heir to a fortune, returns to London, and gets engaged to Diana. Diana tells of her wildlife. Tony forgives, but she takes poison. Tony marries Maxine.
