= Megan Hilty =

American musical theatre actress (born 1981)

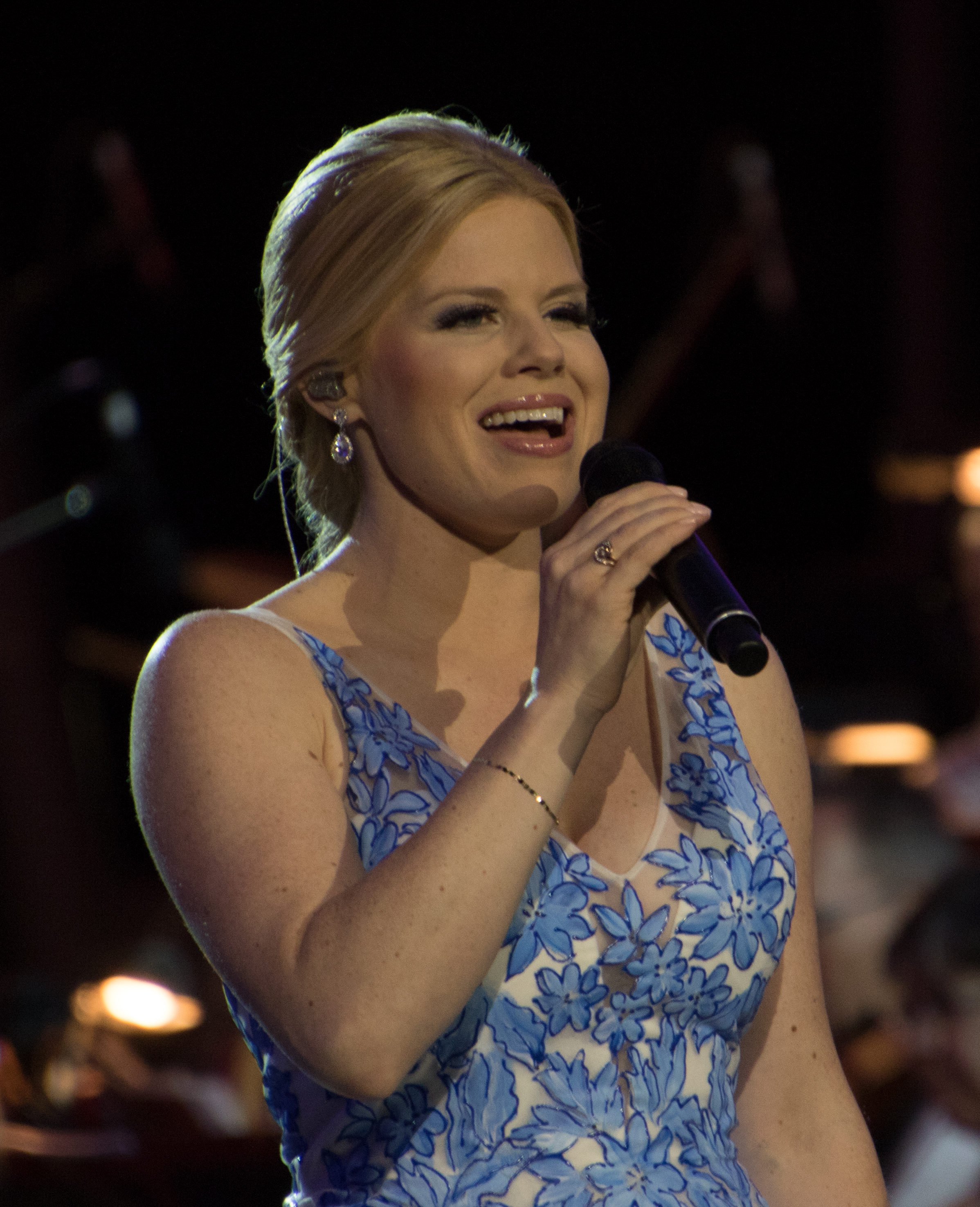
- Hilty at 2018 National Memorial Day Concert
- Born: March 29, 1981 (age 45); Bellevue, Washington, U.S.
- Education: Carnegie Mellon University (BFA)
- Occupations: Actress; singer
- Years active: 2004–present
- Spouse: Brian Gallagher (m. 2013)
- Children: 2

Megan Hilty (born March 29, 1981) is an American actress and singer. She rose to prominence for her roles in Broadway musicals, including her performance as Glinda in Wicked, Doralee Rhodes in 9 to 5: The Musical, and her Tony Award–nominated roles as Brooke Ashton in Noises Off and Madeline Ashton in Death Becomes Her. She also starred as Ivy Lynn on the musical-drama series Smash, on which she sang the Grammy Award-nominated "Let Me Be Your Star", and portrayed Liz on the sitcom Sean Saves the World.

== Early life ==
Hilty was born in Bellevue, Washington, the daughter of Donna and Jack Hilty. She began taking vocal lessons at the age of 12 and was interested in performing opera. She attended Sammamish High School in Bellevue then transferred to the Washington Academy of Performing Arts Conservatory High School in Redmond, and later attended the Chrysalis School in Woodinville.

Hilty graduated from the Carnegie Mellon School of Drama in 2004 and is a member of the Actors' Equity Association. She is a recipient of the National Society of Arts and Letters Award for Excellence in Musical Theater.

== Career ==
Shortly before graduating from Carnegie Mellon University, Hilty auditioned for the 2004 national tour of Little Shop of Horrors for the role of Audrey. However, despite being initially cast as Audrey, the producers let her go after Anthony Rapp was cast as Seymour and they told Hilty she was "too young/not age appropriate" to play opposite Rapp.

Hilty then auditioned for the musical Wicked. She moved to New York City after graduating and, in August 2004, made her Broadway debut as the standby for Glinda the Good Witch. She performed in the role for the first time on October 8, 2004, opposite Idina Menzel as Elphaba. Hilty took over the role from Jennifer Laura Thompson on May 31, 2005. After playing the role for a year, Hilty ended her run on May 28, 2006, and was succeeded by Kate Reinders.

Hilty then reprised the role on the first national tour of the show from September through December 2006, replacing Kendra Kassebaum. Soon after, Hilty originated the role in the Los Angeles sit-down production, which began previews on February 10, 2007, and opened on February 21. She left the production on May 18, 2008, and was replaced by Erin Mackey, only to return on October 31, 2008, to close the production, which played its final performance on January 11, 2009.

Hilty starred in the musical Vanities during its premiere engagement at the Mountain View Center for the Performing Arts in Mountain View, California. In addition to her stage work, Hilty has made guest appearances on television shows including The Closer, The Suite Life of Zack & Cody, Ugly Betty, CSI: Crime Scene Investigation, Desperate Housewives, and Shark. She was the singing voice of Snow White in the animated feature film Shrek the Third.

In 2008, Hilty joined Allison Janney, Stephanie J. Block, and Marc Kudisch in the musical adaptation of the 1980 film 9 to 5. The production was directed by Joe Mantello, with a pre-Broadway run at the Ahmanson Theatre in Los Angeles, which opened on September 9, 2008. Hilty had participated in workshops and readings as the character Doralee Rhodes (the character Dolly Parton had played in the film version). The musical began preview performances on Broadway at the Marquis Theatre on April 7, 2009, with an official opening on April 30, 2009, closing on September 6, 2009. For this role, Hilty was nominated for the Outer Critics Circle Award for Outstanding Actress in a Musical, the Drama League Award for Distinguished Performance, and the Drama Desk Award for Outstanding Actress in a Musical.

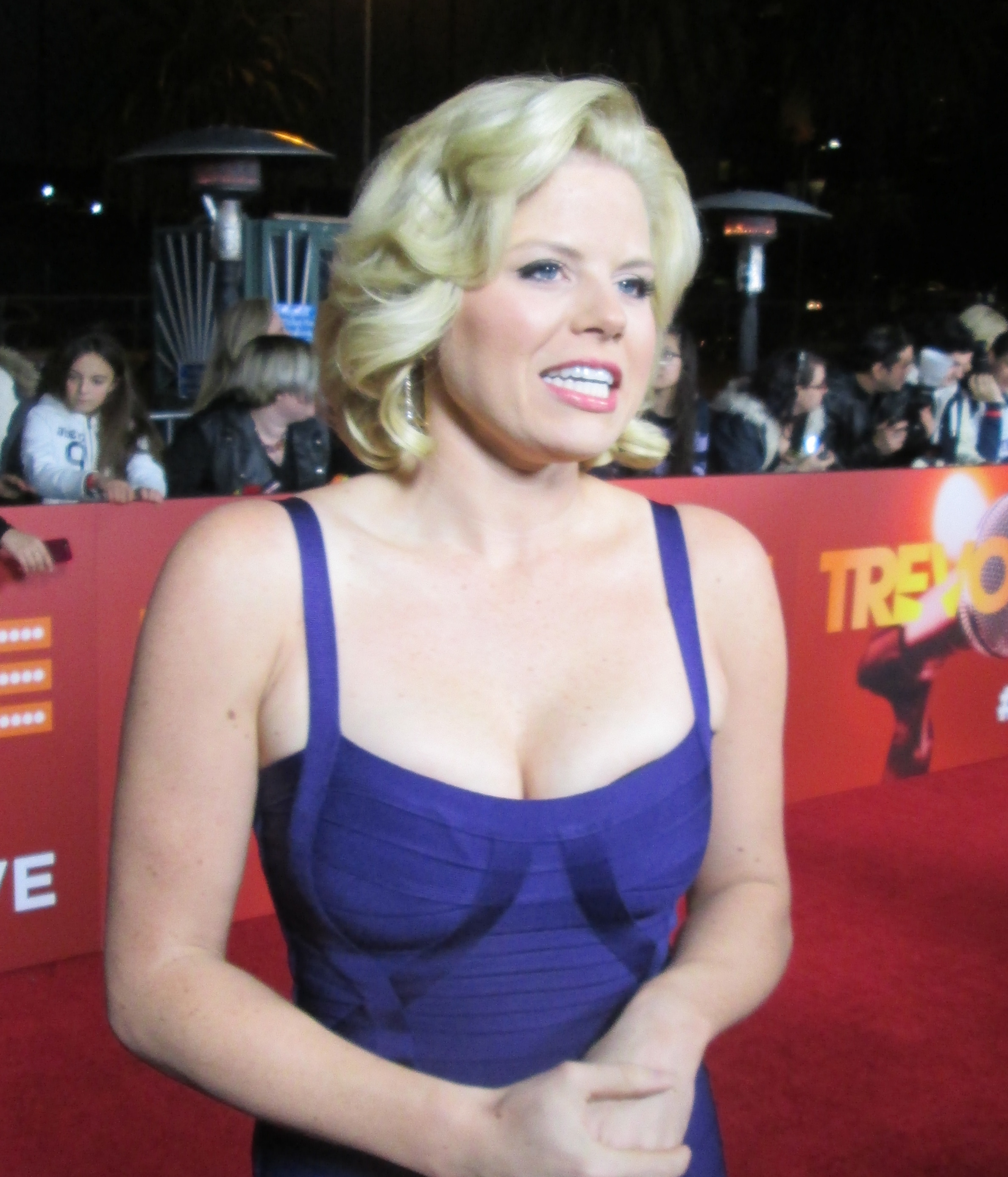
Hilty supporting The Trevor Project in December 2013

In 2009, Hilty appeared in an episode of CSI: Crime Scene Investigation entitled "Deep Fried and Minty Fresh", playing a fast food manager helping out with a murder at Choozy's Chicken. She also appeared in two episodes of Desperate Housewives as the other woman to Carlos' boss. Hilty also lent her talents in Rated RSO: The Music and Lyrics of Ryan Scott Oliver at the Boston Court Performing Arts Center in December 2009, alongside Lesli Margherita, Steve Kazee, Morgan Karr, Natalie Weiss, and others. Hilty also branched off into a coffee and tea product line. In 2010, Hilty confirmed that she would voice the character of the China Princess in the animated film Legends of Oz: Dorothy's Return. In 2011, it was announced that she was cast in the NBC musical-drama series Smash as Ivy Lynn, opposite Katharine McPhee, Debra Messing, Anjelica Huston, and Brian d'Arcy James. The series premiered on February 6, 2012, and aired for two seasons.

In May 2012, Hilty appeared in Gentlemen Prefer Blondes as a part of the Encores! staged concert series. She appeared as Lorelei Lee alongside Brennan Brown, Simon Jones, and Rachel York. Hilty received rave reviews for her performance, with The New York Times rating her performance on par with those of Carol Channing and Marilyn Monroe. By October, she voiced Rosetta in Secret of the Wings to Tinker Bell and the Legend of the NeverBeast. In November 2012, it was announced that Hilty would appear on the album I'm Ready: The Songs of Rob Rokicki. Hilty released her debut solo album, It Happens All the Time, on March 12, 2013. On June 13, 2013, it was announced that Hilty would star alongside Sean Hayes in the NBC sitcom Sean Saves the World. The series was cancelled on January 28, 2014, after airing 13 episodes.

In July 2015, it was reported that Hilty would return to Broadway in the Roundabout Theatre Company's revival of Noises Off, portraying Brooke Ashton. For her performance, Hilty received nominations for the Tony Award for Best Featured Actress in a Play, the Drama Desk Award for Outstanding Featured Actress in a Play, and the Drama League Award for Distinguished Performance. That same year, she recurred as Charlene on Girlfriends' Guide to Divorce. On July 7, 2016, Hilty appeared alongside Matthew Morrison for an evening with The New York Pops at the Forest Hills Stadium in Queens.

In November 2021, it was announced that Hilty would be playing Lily St. Regis in NBC's Annie Live!, replacing Jane Krakowski who withdrew from the show after getting a breakthrough case of COVID-19.

In 2024, Hilty starred in the stage adaptation of Death Becomes Her as Madeline Ashton, opposite co-lead Jennifer Simard as Helen Sharp. The production's out of town tryout ran at Chicago's Cadillac Palace Theatre from April 30 through June 2, 2024. Hilty and Simard led the production on Broadway, at the Lunt-Fontanne Theatre, with previews beginning October 23, before opening on November 21. Hilty received her second Tony nomination for her portrayal of Madeline. Her final performance as Madeline Ashton was on January 11, 2026.

On October 1, 2026, it was announced by Playbill that Hilty would be returning to Broadway in the role of Sally Applewhite / Mary Hatch Bailey in a limited engagement of It’s a Wonderful Life: Live Radio Play at the Broadhurst Theatre during the 2026 holiday season.

== Personal life ==
Hilty was in a relationship with actor Steve Kazee from 2005 until 2012. On November 2, 2013, Hilty married actor Brian Gallagher in Las Vegas, Nevada. In March 2014, she announced that she was expecting their first child. Hilty gave birth to a daughter, Viola Philomena Gallagher, on September 18, 2014. On September 24, 2016, she announced that she was pregnant with her second child. Their son, Ronan Laine Gallagher, was born on March 13, 2017.

On September 4, 2022, Hilty's sister Lauren, brother-in-law Ross Mickel, and nephew Remy were killed in a floatplane crash into Puget Sound off the coast of Whidbey Island. Lauren Hilty-Mickel was eight months pregnant at the time of her death.

== Acting credits ==
=== Theatre ===
| Year | Title | Role | Location |
|---|---|---|---|
| 2004–05 | Wicked | Standby for Glinda | Gershwin Theatre |
| 2005–06 | Wicked | Glinda | Gershwin Theatre |
| 2006 | Vanities | Mary | Mountain View Center |
| 2006 | Wicked | Glinda | North American National Tour |
| 2007–08; 2008–09 | Wicked | Glinda | Hollywood Pantages Theatre |
| 2008 | 9 to 5: The Musical | Doralee Rhodes | Ahmanson Theatre |
| 2009 | 9 to 5: The Musical | Doralee Rhodes | Marquis Theatre |
| 2012 | Gentlemen Prefer Blondes | Lorelei Lee | New York City Center |
| 2015 | Annie Get Your Gun | Annie Oakley | New York City Center |
| 2016 | Noises Off | Brooke Ashton | American Airlines Theatre |
| 2018 | Little Shop of Horrors | Audrey | John F. Kennedy Center for the Performing Arts |
| 2018 | Annie | Lily St. Regis | Hollywood Bowl |
| 2024 | Death Becomes Her | Madeline Ashton | Cadillac Palace Theatre |
| 2024–26 | Death Becomes Her | Madeline Ashton | Lunt-Fontanne Theatre |
| 2026 | It’s A Wonderful Life | Sally Applewhite / Mary Hatch Bailey & Others | Broadhurst Theatre |

== Filmography ==
=== Film ===
| Year | Title | Role | Notes |
|---|---|---|---|
| 2007 | Shrek the Third | Snow White (singing voice) | |
| 2007 | The Secret of the Magic Gourd | Ms. Lee | English voice in the Disney version |
| 2010 | What Happens Next | Ruthie | |
| 2010 | Bitter Feast | Peg | |
| 2010 | Happiest Man Alive | Woman | Short film |
| 2011 | The Maiden and the Princess | Adult Maiden (voice) | |
| 2012 | Secret of the Wings | Rosetta (voice) | |
| 2014 | The Pirate Fairy | Rosetta (voice) | |
| 2014 | Tinker Bell and the Legend of the NeverBeast | Rosetta (voice) | |
| 2014 | Legends of Oz: Dorothy's Return | China Princess / Queen Mouse (voice) | |
| 2016 | Rules Don't Apply | Sally | |

=== Television ===
| Year | Title | Role | Notes |
|---|---|---|---|
| 2007 | The Suite Life of Zack & Cody | Enid | Episode: "The Arwin That Came to Dinner" |
| 2007 | The Closer | Michelle Edwards | 2 episodes |
| 2007 | Ugly Betty | Glinda the Good Witch | Episode: "Something Wicked This Way Comes" |
| 2008 | Shark | Laurel Hasbrouck | Episode: "One Hit Wonder" |
| 2009 | CSI: Crime Scene Investigation | Kiwi Long | Episode: "Deep Fried and Minty Fresh" |
| 2009 | Desperate Housewives | Shayla Grove | 2 episodes |
| 2009 | Eli Stone | Cheryl | Episode: "Flight Path" |
| 2009–2010 | Glenn Martin, DDS | Singing Bum (voice) | 2 episodes |
| 2010 | Phineas and Ferb | Aunt Tiana (voice) | Episode: "Just Passing Through/Candace's Big Day" |
| 2010 | Bones | Julie Coyle | Episode: "The Death of the Queen Bee" |
| 2010 | Louie | Heckler | Episode: "Heckler/Cop Movie" |
| 2010, 2019 | American Dad! | TV Guide Employee (voice) | 2 episodes |
| 2011 | Prayer Hour | Jo Ellen | Television film |
| 2011 | Melissa & Joey | Tiffany Longo | 2 episodes |
| 2011 | The Penguins of Madagascar | Frances Alberta (voice) | Episode: "The Hoboken Surprise" |
| 2011 | Pixie Hollow Games | Rosetta (voice) | Television short |
| 2012–2013 | Smash | Ivy Lynn | Lead role, 32 episodes |
| 2012–2014 | Robot and Monster | J.D. (voice) | 15 episodes |
| 2012, 2022 | Robot Chicken | Various voices | 2 episodes |
| 2013, 2021 | Family Guy | Various voices | 2 episodes |
| 2013–2014 | Sean Saves the World | Liz | 13 episodes |
| 2014 | Dora and Friends: Into the City! | La Diva (voice) | Episode: "Dora Saves Opera Land" |
| 2016 | I Shudder | Sarah Morelle | Television pilot |
| 2016 | Girlfriends' Guide to Divorce | Charlene Frumpkis | 3 episodes |
| 2016 | The Good Wife | Holly Westfall | 3 episodes |
| 2016 | Difficult People | Cassie | Episode: "Kessler Epstein Foundation" |
| 2016 | BrainDead | Misty Alise | 8 episodes |
| 2016–2018 | Sofia the First | Princess Charlotte and Prisma (voice) | 6 episodes |
| 2017 | Unikitty! | Demony Kitty (voice) | Episode: "Spoooooky Game" |
| 2018 | The Wonderful Wingits | Mom (voice) | Pilot |
| 2018 | The Good Fight | Holly Westfall | Episode: "Day 457" |
| 2018 | Santa's Boots | Holly Montell | Television film |
| 2019 | Sweet Mountain Christmas | Laney Blu | Television film |
| 2019 | Patsy & Loretta | Patsy Cline | Television film |
| 2019–2022 | T.O.T.S. | K.C. the Koala (voice) | Main role |
| 2019–2022 | Doc McStuffins | Topsy Turvy Tilly (voice) | Episode: "Lost & Found" |
| 2020–2021 | It's Pony | Beatrice (voice) | 8 episodes |
| 2020–2022 | Madagascar: A Little Wild | Ziggy / various (voice) | 11 episodes |
| 2020–2022 | Trolls: TrollsTopia | Holly Darlin' (voice) | Main role |
| 2021 | Centaurworld | Wammawink (voice) | Main role |
| 2021 | Trolls: Holiday in Harmony | Holly Darlin' (voice) | Television short |
| 2021 | Annie Live! | Lily St. Regis | Live performance |
| 2021 | Tuca & Bertie | Bee Nurse (voice) | Episode: "The Pain Garden" |
| 2024 | The Pradeeps of Pittsburgh | Janice Mills | 8 episodes |
| 2026 | Mickey Mouse Clubhouse+ | Lasso Lucy (voice) | Episode: "Mickey's Country Farm" |

== Awards and nominations ==
| Year | Award | Category | Work | Result |
|---|---|---|---|---|
| 2006 | Broadway.com Audience Award | Favorite Female Replacement | Wicked | Nominated |
| 2009 | Drama Desk Award | Outstanding Actress in a Musical | 9 to 5: The Musical | Nominated |
| 2009 | Drama League Award | Distinguished Performance | 9 to 5: The Musical | Nominated |
| 2009 | Outer Critics Circle Award | Outstanding Actress in a Musical | 9 to 5: The Musical | Nominated |
| 2009 | Broadway.com Audience Award | Favorite Actress in a Musical | 9 to 5: The Musical | Nominated |
| 2013 | Dorian Awards | TV Musical Performance of the Year | "Let Me Be Your Star" from Smash | Nominated |
| 2013 | Behind the Voice Actors Award | Best Vocal Ensemble in a New Television Series | Robot and Monster | Nominated |
| 2013 | Behind the Voice Actors Award | Best Vocal Ensemble in a TV Special/Direct-to-DVD Title or Theatrical Short | Secret of the Wings | Nominated |
| 2015 | Behind the Voice Actors Award | Best Vocal Ensemble in a TV Special/Direct-to-DVD Title or Theatrical Short | The Pirate Fairy | Nominated |
| 2015 | Behind the Voice Actors Award | Best Female Vocal Performance in a Feature Film in a Supporting Role | Legends of Oz: Dorothy's Return | Nominated |
| 2016 | Broadway.com Audience Award | Favorite Featured Actress in a Play | Noises Off | Won |
| 2016 | Tony Award | Best Featured Actress in a Play | Noises Off | Nominated |
| 2016 | Drama Desk Award | Outstanding Featured Actress in a Play | Noises Off | Nominated |
| 2016 | Drama League Award | Distinguished Performance | Noises Off | Nominated |
| 2025 | Tony Award | Best Performance by an Actress in a Leading Role in a Musical | Death Becomes Her | Nominated |
| 2025 | Grammy Award | Best Musical Theater Album | Death Becomes Her | Nominated |
| 2025 | Drama League Award | Distinguished Performance | Death Becomes Her | Nominated |
| 2025 | Broadway.com Audience Award | Favorite Leading Actress in a Musical | Death Becomes Her | Nominated |
| 2025 | Broadway.com Audience Award | Favorite Diva Performance | Death Becomes Her | Nominated |
| 2025 | Broadway.com Audience Award | Favorite Funny Performance | Death Becomes Her | Nominated |
| 2025 | Broadway.com Audience Award | Favorite Onstage Pair (with Jennifer Simard) | Death Becomes Her | Won |
| 2025 | Broadway.com Audience Award | Performance of the Year (Musical) | Death Becomes Her | Won |
| 2025 | Dorian Award | Outstanding Lead Performance in a Broadway Musical | Death Becomes Her | Won |
