= List of Smash characters =

Characters from the NBC TV show

Smash is a musical-drama television series, broadcast on NBC since February 6, 2012. Smash features an ensemble cast, with 13 regular cast members over the course of two seasons.

The show is about the creation of Broadway musicals. The first season revolves around the creation of Bombshell, a musical about the life of Marilyn Monroe. The second season follows Bombshell's road to Broadway, and introduces a new musical, Hit List.

== Main characters ==
=== Julia Houston ===
Debra Messing portrays Julia Houston, a successful Broadway lyricist and Bombshell's co-writer. She is married with a son, but had an affair with Michael Swift, who played Joe DiMaggio in the initial Bombshell workshop. She initially reconciles with her husband Frank, but they decide to get a divorce early in the second season. After spending more time at Hit List, Julia and Tom clash and they end their partnership. Houston is based on creator Theresa Rebeck.

=== Derek Wills ===
Jack Davenport portrays Derek Wills, the often sleazy director and choreographer of Bombshell (in Season 1), who will stop at nothing to make the show a success. He has an on-and-off relationship with Bombshell star Ivy Lynn, though he has also shown interest in Karen Cartwright and had a physical relationship with Rebecca Duvall during the Boston preview before she left the show. In Season 2, he quits Bombshell and becomes the director and choreographer of Hit List.

=== Karen Cartwright ===
Katharine McPhee portrays Karen Cartwright, an ingenue from Iowa, who has a successful audition and becomes a serious contender for the role of Monroe in Bombshell. Somewhat new to show business, her naiveté is generally scorned by her peers, though her talent is rarely called into question. She played Marilyn for the Boston preview, when Rebecca Duvall left. In season two, she is broken up with long-time boyfriend Dev after he cheated on her with Ivy in season one and begins seeing Jimmy Collins. She leaves Bombshell and joins Hit List.

=== Tom Levitt ===
Christian Borle portrays Tom Levitt, a theatrical composer and Julia's longtime songwriting partner. He and Derek Wills have an acrimonious relationship stemming from a business fallout 11 years ago. Tom, who is gay, briefly dates a Republican lawyer but later becomes attracted to Sam Strickland, a dancer in the ensemble of Bombshell. In Season 2, Tom and Sam break up and Tom becomes the director of Bombshell after Derek quits. It is successful enough that Tom is invited to direct another show, causing him to end his writing partnership with Julia.

=== Ivy Lynn ===
Megan Hilty portrays Ivy Lynn, a seasoned performer who, at the beginning of the series, is working in the ensemble of Heaven On Earth, a Broadway musical that Tom and Julia wrote. Ivy is favored by nearly everyone on board with the production to play Marilyn Monroe in Bombshell, but after the workshop flops, she is replaced by a big movie star. Throughout the show, she's in an on-and-off relationship with the Bombshell director/choreographer Derek Wills and finds herself constantly competing with Karen in many different situations, eventually losing the role of Marilyn to her for the Boston previews. In the second season, she contemplates leaving show business, after Karen has her fired from Bombshell. She eventually decides to pursue other career options. She gets the female lead in Liaisons, but it ends up being a mess and closes. Karen leaves Bombshell about the same time for Hit List and Ivy takes back the lead of Bombshell. In "The Transfer," she learns she is pregnant.

=== Eileen Rand ===
Anjelica Huston portrays Eileen Rand, Bombshell's tenacious producer, who is dealing with divorce proceedings from her husband, Jerry, which could threaten the musical and forces her to think outside the box in securing funds for the show. A running gag throughout the series is Eileen throwing drinks into Jerry's unsavory face. In the first season, she begins a relationship with a kind and handsome bartender, Nick, who later provides funding needed to get the show on Broadway. They lose funding early in the second season because the money is dirty and Nick goes to jail and ends their relationship. Because of the funding issue, Eileen briefly steps down as producer with Jerry stepping in. She gets the position back and starts to date a New York Times columnist.

=== Ellis Boyd ===
Jaime Cepero portrays Ellis Boyd, Tom's and later Eileen's conniving personal assistant during the first season, who is attempting to receive credit for Bombshell and make his way as a show producer. As the first season continues, Ellis, convinced that with an off-hand comment he is the inventor of Marilyn Monroe and somehow created the show, takes more inappropriate steps to be recognized as a producer, including giving Rebecca a drink mixed with peanuts, which she is allergic to, in order to remove her as the star. He boasts of this to Eileen as proof of his "skills" but she responds by firing him. Cepero did not return for season 2, though he makes small appearance in Episode 11 of season 2 during Tom's nightmare.

=== Dev Sundaram ===
Raza Jaffrey portrays Dev Sundaram, Karen's live-in boyfriend, who works in the office of the New York City mayor's press secretary who ultimately forces her to choose between their relationship or her career. He proposes marriage but when Karen is unsure, Dev sleeps with Ivy. Ivy tells Karen of their encounter and an angry Karen breaks up with Dev. Jaffrey did not return as part of the main cast for season 2.

=== Frank Houston ===
Brian d'Arcy James portrays Frank Houston, Julia's husband and a high-school chemistry teacher, who wishes that Julia would spend more time at home. He was upset when she confessed to her affair with Michael Swift and more so when he confronted Swift and learned Julia had cheated on him earlier in the marriage. They separated but eventually reconciled. However, they decide to get a divorce in the second season. Julia makes good with Frank in the series finale and they both go easy with their divorce proceedings. James was credited as recurring in Season 1's pilot, but was promoted to regular from episode 2. James did not return as part of the main cast for season 2.

=== Sam Strickland ===
Leslie Odom, Jr. portrays Sam Strickland, an ensemble member, a good friend of Ivy who is gay and very much into sports. Due to their mutual friendship with Ivy, he forms a connection with Tom. Sam and Tom break up in Season 2 as Sam takes a role in a touring production of The Book of Mormon. Sam returns to town and quits the Mormon job, but can only get a temporary position in Bombshell. After a fallout with Tom, he joins the cast of Hit List as JB Planko, manager for "The Diva" and Nina Hope. Initially recurring, Odom joins the main cast in season 2.

=== Jimmy Collins ===
Jeremy Jordan portrays Jimmy Collins, a young songwriter from Brooklyn with a troubled past. He has an aggressive temperament and owes thousands of dollars to his former drug lord & brother. He and his roommate Kyle are writing a new musical, Hit List. After hearing Jimmy singing a song that he wrote for it, Karen enlists the help of former Bombshell director, Derek. Karen and Derek eventually join the musical. Jordan joined the cast at the start of season 2.

=== Kyle Bishop ===
Andy Mientus portrays Kyle Bishop, a Jonathan Larson-like poor kid from Brooklyn with dreams of writing for Broadway. He and Jimmy are writing a musical Hit List. He wrote the book, and Jimmy wrote the music. He and Jimmy are childhood friends. Kyle saved Jimmy from his self-destruction and drug use. They have an apartment together. He does, however, have a crush on Jimmy. He begins dating the lighting technician for Hit List, Blake. However, a starstruck Kyle begins an affair with Tom Levitt after the Bombshell premiere. He dies after being hit by a car. They dim the lights at the theatre for him. He post-humously wins the Tony Award for Best Book of a Musical. Jimmy gives a speech honoring him. Mientus joined the cast at the start of the second season.

=== Ana Vargas ===
Krysta Rodriguez portrays Ana Vargas, Karen's new roommate and old friend who is looking for her big break and joins Hit List as "The Diva". After being kicked out of her role by Daisy Parker, she joins the national tour of the show Once. Rodriguez became a part of the cast in season 2.

== Special guest stars ==
=== Lyle West ===
Nick Jonas portrays Lyle West, a former child star who got his start in a show written by Tom and directed by Derek. He is a potential investor for Bombshell.

=== Leigh Conroy ===
Bernadette Peters portrays Leigh Conroy, former stage actress and Ivy's mother. She eventually joins the cast of Bombshell, as the mother of Marilyn Monroe.

=== Rebecca Duvall ===
Uma Thurman (1x10–1x14) portrays Rebecca Duvall, a Hollywood actress who wants to star in Bombshell despite having limited musical ability. Initially, the team behind Bombshell are intent on pandering to Rebecca's celebrity status, but grow increasingly exasperated by her unprofessional behavior. After the first preview, Rebecca is hospitalized after Ellis slips peanuts, which she is allergic to, in her smoothie. She eventually backs out of the show.

=== Veronica Moore ===
Jennifer Hudson (season 2) portrays Veronica Moore, a Tony Award-winning Broadway star who has had to pay a price to reach her Broadway dream.

=== Terrence Falls ===
Sean Hayes (season 2) portrays Terrence Falls, a comedic television and film star who is making his Broadway debut in the musical Liaisons, based on Les Liaisons Dangereuses.

== Recurring characters ==
- Linda (Ann Harada), the stage manager of Bombshell.
- Lisa McMann (Annaleigh Ashford), a failed actress and frenemy of Ivy and Sam. In the pilot, she can be seen auditioning for the role of Marilyn Monroe in Bombshell. She soon thereafter leaves the business and causes Ivy to think about doing the same after hearing about her success with stationery.
- Roger and Mrs. Cartwright (Dylan Baker and Becky Ann Baker), Karen's parents.
- Jerry Rand (Michael Cristofer), Eileen's ex-husband and former producing partner.
- Leo Houston (Emory Cohen), the son of Julia and Frank.
- Bobby (Wesley Taylor), a Bombshell ensemble member who is not afraid to say what is on his mind. He is a friend of Ivy and later, Karen.
- Dennis (Phillip Spaeth), a Bombshell ensemble member and friend of Ivy.
- Jessica (Savannah Wise), a Bombshell ensemble member and friend of Ivy and later, Karen.
- Sue (Jenny Laroche), a Bombshell ensemble member and friend of Ivy and later, Karen.
- Nick Felder (Thorsten Kaye), a bartender who flirts with Eileen. He later introduces Eileen to new investors, and the two date for a while until Nick is arrested for illegal activities related to the investors.
- Michael Swift (Will Chase) (season 1), a musical theatre star and Julia's old flame, cast in Bombshell in the role of Joe DiMaggio. The two rekindle their affair, are discovered by Julia's son, and break up shortly thereafter. It is implied in the Season 2 finale that they get back together, as Julia shows him a letter she wrote about her feelings for him.
- John Goodwin (Neal Bledsoe) (season 1), a lawyer Tom dates, who helped get Julia's son Leo out of jail. The two break up however, when John senses that Tom has feelings for Sam.
- Daisy Parker (Mara Davi) (seasons 1–2), a dancer Derek sexually harassed and rival to Ana for the role of the Diva in Hitlist.
- R.J. Quigley (Tala Ashe) (season 1), Dev's colleague, a reporter for The New York Times. She is shown to have feelings for Dev, and tries to get together with him while Karen is in Boston.
- Monica Swift (Michelle Federer) (season 1), Michael's estranged-wife, who left him after she found out about Michael and Julia.
- Scott Nichols (Jesse L. Martin) (season 2), artistic director of the Manhattan Theatre Workshop who has a brief relationship with Julia and helps Hit List take off.
- Margot (Nikki Blonsky), Jerry Rand's assistant in the second season.
- Agnes (Daphne Rubin-Vega), Eileen Rand's publicist in the second season.
- Randall (Sean Dugan), Rebecca's assistant and Ellis' booty call.

== Cameos ==
- Kate Clinton, lesbian comedian and actress ("Pilot")
- Jordan Roth, President of Jujamcyn Theaters ("The Callback", "On Broadway")
- Tom Kitt, Broadway musical director and composer of Next to Normal ("The Callback")
- Manny Azenberg, producer ("Enter Mr. DiMaggio", "Understudy")
- Ryan Tedder, singer-songwriter and frontman for pop rock band OneRepublic ("The Coup")
- Michael Riedel, theater columnist for the New York Post ("Hell on Earth", "On Broadway")
- Doug Hughes, director of plays such as Frozen and Doubt ("Hell on Earth")
- James Monroe Iglehart, Broadway theatre actor Aladdin and Hamilton ("Hell on Earth")
- Robyn Goodman, producer of such musicals as Avenue Q and In the Heights ("Understudy")
- Tony Yazbeck, Broadway theatre actor ("Publicity", "Tech")
- Ty Jones, actor, playwright, producing artistic director of the Classical Theatre of Harlem as Sam's brother, Paul Strickland. ("Tech")
- Marc Kudisch, Broadway theatre actor ("Previews")
- Marc Shaiman, Broadway, TV, and movie composer (and Smash composer) ("Previews", "Opening Night")
- Scott Wittman, Broadway, TV, and movie composer (and Smash composer) ("Previews", "Opening Night")
- Brenda Braxton, Tony-nominated Broadway actress ("On Broadway")
- Harvey Fierstein, Broadway theatre/film actor/writer ("The Fallout")
- Annaleigh Ashford, Broadway actress, of Legally Blonde and Wicked ("Pilot", "The Fallout")
- Brynn O'Malley, Broadway actress of Annie ("The Fallout")
- Mara Davi, Broadway actress of A Chorus Line ("The Fallout")
- Margo Martindale, acclaimed Broadway actress ("The Fallout")
- Bernie Telsey, famed Broadway casting director ("The Dramaturg")
- Matt Bogart, Broadway actor of Jersey Boys ("The Dramaturg")
- Tom Galantich, Broadway actor ("The Dramaturg")
- Jon Robin Baitz, acclaimed playwright ("The Read-Through")
- Kathy Fitzgerald, Broadway actress of The Producers and 9 to 5 ("Musical Chairs")
- Seth Rudetsky, Broadway radio host and Playbill.com video blogger ("Musical Chairs")
- Liza Minnelli, highly acclaimed Hollywood and Broadway actress ("The Surprise Party")
- Edward Hibbert, Broadway actor of The Drowsy Chaperone and Curtains ("Opening Night")
- Donna McKechnie, Broadway actress, most notably of A Chorus Line ("Opening Night")
- Stephen Bogardus, Broadway actor of City of Angels and White Christmas ("Opening Night")
- Rosie O'Donnell, American actress, comedian and television personality ("Opening Night", "The Tonys")
- Kathie Lee Gifford, The Today Show television host ("The Producers")
- Frank DiLella, producer and reporter for On Stage ("The Phenomenon")
- Lindsay Mendez, Broadway actress of Godspell, Dogfight and Wicked ("The Transfer")
- Lin-Manuel Miranda, Broadway actor and composer of In the Heights, Hamilton and Bring it On ("The Transfer")
- Michael Musto, former editor of The Village Voice ("The Nominations")
- Mary Testa, Broadway actress of 42nd Street and Xanadu ("The Nominations")
- Dee Hoty, Broadway actress of City of Angels, The Will Rogers Follies and Mamma Mia! ("The Nominations")
- Cheyenne Jackson, Broadway actor of All Shook Up and Xanadu ("The Nominations")
- Christine Ebersole, two time Tony winner and Broadway actress of 42nd Street and Grey Gardens ("The Nominations")
- Lillias White, Broadway actress of How to Succeed and Finian's Rainbow ("The Tonys")
- Ron Rifkin, Broadway actor of Cabaret ("The Tonys")
- Kathleen Marshall, Tony-nominated director/choreographer for Wonderful Town, The Pajama Game, and Anything Goes ("The Tonys")
- Marin Mazzie, Broadway actress of Kiss Me, Kate and Next to Normal ("The Tonys")
- Susan Blackwell, Broadway.com video blogger and Broadway actress of title of show ("The Tonys")
