= Original songs in Smash =

Smash is an American musical-drama television series created by playwright Theresa Rebeck. It premiered in the United States on NBC on February 6, 2012. The series revolves around a fictional New York theater community making new Broadway musicals. In the first season, the focus was on the making of Bombshell, a musical based on the life of Marilyn Monroe. In the second season, the show was split between taking Bombshell to Broadway and the creation and mounting of a contemporary pop musical called Hit List that was about the price of fame. Other fictional musicals that were touched on for which original songs were performed include Beautiful and Liaisons. A few of the songs were written for events outside of the aforementioned musicals.

Marc Shaiman and Scott Wittman wrote all but one of the songs in the first season. In the second season, they wrote all of the songs outside of Hit List, along with several Hit List songs, as will be noted below. All their songs written for the show, except for a couple where only a few lines were written, can be found listed in the ASCAP music database. The other songwriters are noted and referenced where appropriate.

The following list details the original songs featured in Smash.

== The 20th Century Fox Mambo ==
"The 20th Century Fox Mambo" is an original song introduced in the second episode of the first season of the musical TV series Smash, entitled "The Callback". It was written by Marc Shaiman and Scott Wittman, but in the show's universe, it was written by songwriting team Tom Levitt (Christian Borle) and Julia Houston (Debra Messing) for their Marilyn Monroe musical Bombshell.

In the episode, Karen Cartwright (Katharine McPhee) needs to give a dance audition for the producing team as part of trying to get the role of Marilyn in Bombshell. She works with director and choreographer Derek Wills (Jack Davenport) and then performs this song with the ensemble members in front of the producing team.

The song is reprised several more times during the first season. It is performed by Ivy Lynn (Megan Hilty) in the fourth episode "The Cost of Art", by Karen and Ivy separately in the seventh episode "The Workshop, and by Karen in the fifteenth episode "Bombshell" for a preview show in Boston. In the second season, the song is reprised in the thirteenth episode "The Producers" by Ivy and the Bombshell ensemble, with a little assist from Kathie Lee Gifford in a cameo, for some musical theater children.

The song, with McPhee's vocals, was originally released as a single on iTunes and Amazon.com's MP3 store and is available on the cast albums The Music of Smash and Bombshell.

== A Letter from Cecile ==
"A Letter from Cecile" is an original song introduced in the sixth episode of the second season of the musical TV series Smash, entitled "The Fringe". It was written by Marc Shaiman and Scott Wittman, but within the show's universe, it was written by an unnamed composer for the Liaisons musical that Ivy Lynn (Megan Hilty) is in.

In the episode, Ivy is unhappy with the direction that the Liaisons production has taken now that star Terry Falls (Sean Hayes) has gone off his various medications and has turned the show into a trainwreck. With the press in attendance to get a preview of the show, she sings this song in an operatic and comedic way, stealing some of Terry's thunder.

The song is available as a single.

== A Love Letter from the Times ==
"A Love Letter from the Times" is an original song introduced in the tenth episode of the second season of the musical TV series Smash, entitled "The Surprise Party". It was written by Marc Shaiman and Scott Wittman, but in the show's universe, it was written by Tom Levitt (Christian Borle).

In the episode, Tom recruits Liza Minnelli (playing herself) to sing this song with him to Ivy Lynn (Megan Hilty) during their dinner together as a surprise for her birthday to make up for their fighting over him hiring her mother for Bombshell.

The song is available as a single.

== A Thousand and One Nights ==
"A Thousand and One Nights" is an original song introduced in the twelfth episode of the first season of the musical TV series Smash, entitled "Publicity". It was written by Marc Shaiman and Scott Wittman, but in the episode, it is presented as a character's fantasy of a Bollywood musical number so the songwriter is unnamed.

In the episode, Karen Cartwright (Katharine McPhee) and her boyfriend Dev (Raza Jaffrey) are having a tense dinner with movie star Rebecca Duvall (Uma Thurman) at an Indian restaurant. Rebecca has taken over as the lead in the Marilyn Monroe musical Bombshell, while Karen is her understudy. However, Rebecca has taken Karen out for quite a bit of partying, which has caused tensions between Karen and Dev. During the meal, Rebecca and Dev start to argue about who is the one harming Karen. An uncomfortable Karen starts watching a Bollywood movie on one of the screens, and then imagines herself in a Bollywood-style movie with first Dev, then herself singing the song, with practically the entire rest of the main cast and various supporting players of the series performing as backup. The song is sung in the style of an Indian Bollywood song, with the performers dressed in Indian clothes.

== Arthur Miller Melody ==
"Arthur Miller Melody" is an original song introduced in the ninth episode of the first season of the musical TV series Smash, entitled "Hell on Earth". It was written by Marc Shaiman and Scott Wittman. In the show's universe it was written by songwriters Julia Houston (Debra Messing) and Tom Levitt (Christian Borle) for their Bombshell musical about Marilyn Monroe.

In the episode, Julia's husband Frank (Brian d'Arcy James) is rummaging around his wife's nightstand looking for something and comes across the sheet music. Something about it catches his eye. Julia later comes home and Frank is at the piano with the sheet music and quietly playing and singing a little bit of the song ("Arthur Miller Melody" is written at the top of the sheet music). He stops and asks her about it, saying the lyrics about Marilyn on the Brooklyn Bridge sound a little strange, voicing his suspicion that Julia is having an affair and the lyrics are really about that. Julia breaks down and admits that she was having an affair, but it is over.

By season 2, the song has developed into a solo sung by Arthur Miller, entitled "The Right Regrets". It was performed by Tom and Julia in Episode 15, The Transfer. The song is available on the cast album Bombshell.

== At Your Feet ==
"At Your Feet" is an original song introduced in the fourteenth episode of the second season of the musical TV series Smash, entitled "The Phenomenon". It was written by the show's in-house songwriters Marc Shaiman and Scott Wittman, but in the show's universe, it was written by songwriting team Tom Levitt (Christian Borle) and Julia Houston (Debra Messing) for their Marilyn Monroe musical Bombshell.

In the episode, we get a short segment of the song, with Leigh Conroy (Bernadette Peters) as Marilyn Monroe's mom Gladys taking young Marilyn (Sophia Anne Caruso) to Grauman's Chinese Theatre and the two perform the song. Earlier, Tom had indicated to Kyle Bishop (Andy Mientus) that Marilyn's mom had left her at the theater and so it was a sad moment, but Kyle suggests that maybe they make the number a happy one, changing what really happened in Marilyn's life to something that was more fantasy. After Kyle's death, we see the number performed during a Bombshell show as more of a happy fantasy than the sad way it was done previously.

The song is available on the cast album Bombshell.

== Big Finish ==
"Big Finish" is an original song introduced in the seventeenth episode of the second season of the musical TV series Smash, entitled "The Tonys". The song is written by the show's in-house songwriters Marc Shaiman and Scott Wittman, but in the show's universe, it was written by songwriting team Tom Levitt (Christian Borle) and Julia Houston (Debra Messing) for a performance at the Tony Awards.

In the episode, Ivy Lynn (Megan Hilty) and Karen Cartwright (Katharine McPhee) perform this number with male dancers at the Tony Awards.

The song is available on the cast album Smash: The Complete Season 2 available digitally.

== Broadway, Here I Come! ==
"Broadway, Here I Come!" is an original song introduced in the first episode of the second season of the musical TV series Smash, entitled "On Broadway". It was written by Joe Iconis. Within the show's universe, it was written by the songwriting team Jimmy Collins (Jeremy Jordan) and Kyle Bishop (Andy Mientus) for their Hit List musical.

In the episode, the setting has Karen Cartwright (Katharine McPhee), having previously become acquainted with Jimmy and Kyle in a bar they work in, finds out from Kyle they are a songwriting team working on a musical. Karen overhears Jimmy singing the song on a piano and then moves closer to watch him perform it. During the song, she dials Derek Wills (Jack Davenport) to have him listen and tells him this may be the next thing they are looking for as the Bombshell musical they were working on has temporarily shut down.

Karen reprises the song in the ninth episode of the second season, entitled "The Parents", at a rehearsal for a benefit (though she is interrupted by Derek before finishing) and then at the benefit, where she is heard singing the last few bars. Ana Vargas (Krysta Rodriguez) reprises part of the song in the eleventh episode of season 2, entitled "The Dress Rehearsal", as part of rehearsing for a new opening for Hit List. The song is reprised twice in the thirteenth episode of season 2 "The Producers", with Ana singing part of it at the beginning of a performance of Hit List while she fires a gun at an unknown person, while Karen sings it a little later in the show as part of the sequence where the Diva shoots Amanda (Karen). The song is lastly reprised in the seventeenth episode of season 2 "The Tonys", where the Hit List cast (composed of Karen, Jimmy, Ana, Sam (Leslie Odom, Jr.)) and the Hit List ensemble perform an a cappella version of the song at the Tony Awards.

The song is available as a single with Jeremy Jordan's vocals only and on the digital album Smash: The Complete Season 2 with vocals from McPhee, Jordan, Rodriguez and Odom as seen in the seventeenth episode of season 2.

=== Critical reception ===
Valeria Oliveira from TVSourceMagazine said of the number in a review of the "On Broadway" episode, "And then there is Jimmy and his musical. I liked the one song from it, but I have no clue what it’s all about yet, so I’d like more information on it."

== Caught in the Storm ==
"Caught in the Storm" is an original song introduced in the second episode of the second season of the musical TV series Smash, entitled "The Fallout". It was written by Pasek and Paul. Within the show's universe, it was written by songwriting team Jimmy Collins (Jeremy Jordan) and Kyle Bishop (Andy Mientus) as part of the Hit List musical they are working on.

In the episode, the setting has Kyle giving the song to Karen Cartwright (Katharine McPhee), who has become acquainted with Kyle and Jimmy, to look at to see if she knows if she can provide some help to getting their musical made. Later, Karen and her roommate Ana Vargas (Krysta Rodriguez) and Bombshell ensemble friends Bobby (Wesley Taylor) and Jessica (Savannah Wise) attend a party in Brooklyn that Jimmy and Kyle are hosting for their friends. Karen, having previously figured out the song with Ana's help, starts to sing it to Jimmy a cappella to impress him and then is accompanied by Ana on piano. Jimmy storms out because he's angry that Kyle showed his work to someone without asking.

The song is reprised by Jimmy in the fifth episode of season 2, "The Read-Through", as Jimmy and Kyle present an informal read-through of Hit List to some friends that Karen has invited to hear the script and songs.

The song is available as a single.

== Ce n'est pas ma faute (It's Not My Fault) ==
"Ce n'est pas ma faute (It's Not My Fault)" is an original song introduced in the seventh episode of the second season of the musical TV series Smash, entitled "Musical Chairs". It was written by Marc Shaiman and Scott Wittman, but within the show's universe, it was written by an unnamed composer for the musical Liaisons that Ivy Lynn (Megan Hilty) is in.

In the episode, the cast of Liaisons is trying to put on a good show for the preview audiences coming to see it, but the show is a disaster since star Terry Falls (Sean Hayes) made many terrible changes to it and the cast tried to fix those changes. Ivy and Terry lament that the show is going badly, so Ivy suggests to Terry that for opening night, they play up the comedy. During the show, Terry and the ensemble launch into a ribald version of this song, which ends up getting big laughs from the audience (which includes Bombshell's Tom Levitt (Christian Borle) and Karen Cartwright (Katharine McPhee) and Hit List's Derek Wills (Jack Davenport), Jimmy Collins (Jeremy Jordan) and Kyle Bishop (Andy Mientus)).

The song is available as a single.

== Chest of Broken Hearts ==
"Chest of Broken Hearts" is an original song introduced in the fourth episode of the second season of the musical TV series Smash, entitled "The Song". It was written by Marc Shaiman and Scott Wittman, but within the show's universe, it was written by songwriting team Jimmy Collins (Jeremy Jordan) and Kyle Bishop (Andy Mientus) for their Hit List musical.

In the episode, Karen Cartwright (Katharine McPhee) is trying to get Jimmy and Kyle a break by having a song of theirs used in Veronica Moore's concert, as explained below for I Can't Let Go. They have been going through a list of songs for Tom and Karen, and Karen sings a portion of this song, which is a ballad. Tom rejects it as not right for Veronica.

It has been confirmed by Jeremy Jordan that the song does not exist in full, and that the snippet heard in the episode is all that was written.

== Cut, Print...Moving On ==
"Cut, Print...Moving On" is an original song introduced in the first episode of the second season of the musical TV series Smash, entitled "On Broadway". It was written by Marc Shaiman and Scott Wittman. Within the show's universe, it was written by the songwriting team Tom Levitt (Christian Borle) and Julia Houston (Debra Messing) for the Bombshell musical they are working on about Marilyn Monroe.

The setting has Karen Cartwright (Katharine McPhee) as Marilyn and the male members of ensemble of Bombshell performing the song on the final night of the musical's previews in Boston.

The song is available on the cast album Bombshell.

=== Critical reception ===
In their review of the season opener, nowhitenoise.com says this of the song: "The season’s opening number is incredibly meta. They get it: the show was awful. And I’m not 100% about this, but I think new showrunner Josh Safran wrote the lyrics. Oh, Safran. This is why we love you." Noel Murray from the AVClub.com says of the opening number, "The opening montage—set to the likeable Bombshell number “Cut, Print… Moving On”—is efficient at doling out backstory, and is energetically edited to boot."

== Dig Deep ==
"Dig Deep" is an original song introduced in the eleventh episode of the first season of the musical TV series Smash, entitled "The Movie Star". It was written by Marc Shaiman and Scott Wittman, but within the show's universe, it was written by the songwriting team of Tom Levitt (Christian Borle) and Julia Houston (Debra Messing) for the Bombshell musical they are working on about Marilyn Monroe.

In "The Movie Star", movie star Rebecca Duvall (Uma Thurman), who is now playing Marilyn, and the Bombshell ensemble are in a rehearsal room acting out an Actors Studio session learning some acting tips from the teacher, and then breaking into the song, while the show cuts away to a fantasy sequence of Rebecca and the ensemble dressed in 1950's clothes and performing the song.

Ivy Lynn (Megan Hilty) reprises the song in the eleventh episode of season 2, entitled "The Dress Rehearsal", as part of Broadway previews for Bombshell.

The song was initially released as a single with Thurman's vocals but is no longer available in that version. The version with Hilty's vocals is available on the cast album Bombshell.

== Don't Forget Me ==
"Don't Forget Me" is an original song introduced in the fifteenth episode of the first season of the musical TV series Smash, entitled "Bombshell". It was written by Marc Shaiman and Scott Wittman, but in the show's universe, it was written by the songwriting team of Tom Levitt (Christian Borle) and Julia Houston (Debra Messing) for their Marilyn Monroe musical Bombshell.

== Don't Let Me Know ==
"Don't Let Me Know" is an original song introduced in the thirteenth episode of the second season of the musical TV series Smash, entitled "The Producers". It was written by Lucie Silvas and Jamie Alexander Hartman, but in the show's universe it was written by songwriting team Jimmy Collins (Jeremy Jordan) and Kyle Bishop (Andy Mientus) for their Hit List musical.

In the episode, during a special Hit List preview for potential Broadway producers, the song is sung by Karen Cartwright (Katharine McPhee) and Jimmy Collins (Jeremy Jordan) as their characters Amanda and Jesse, showing the evolution of the song from stage to recording.

The song is available as a single.

== Don't Say Yes Until I Finish Talking ==
"Don't Say Yes Until I Finish Talking" is an original song introduced in the tenth episode of the musical TV series Smash, entitled "Understudy". The song is written by Marc Shaiman and Scott Wittman, but in the show's universe, it is written by the songwriting team of Tom Levitt (Christian Borle) and Julia Houston (Debra Messing) for their Marilyn Monroe musical Bombshell.

In "Understudy", the song is performed by Tom Levitt and the male members of the ensemble of Bombshell. Tom subs in for the actor playing Darryl Zanuck in the number.

The song is performed again in the fourteenth episode of the first season, "Previews", with an unnamed actor (Marc Kudisch) playing Darryl Zanuck performing the song with the male members of the ensemble during one of the Boston previews.

The song was initially released as a single and is available on the cast album Bombshell.

== Good for You ==
"Good for You" is an original song introduced in the third episode of the second season of the musical TV series Smash, entitled "The Dramaturg". It was written by Drew Gasparini. Within the show's universe, it was written by the songwriting team Jimmy Collins (Jeremy Jordan) and Kyle Bishop (Andy Mientus) for their Hit List Musical.

The episode opens with Karen Cartwright singing the song at a concert and being lifted and carried through the audience, going back to the stage, and then stage-diving into the audience again. The concert turns out to be in Karen's imagination as we snap back to Derek Wills and Karen discussing the song, which Karen has made a demo of in order to get Derek interested in helping the two young men.

The song is available as a single.

== The Goodbye Song ==
"The Goodbye Song" is an original song introduced in the thirteenth episode of the second season of the musical TV series Smash, entitled "The Producers". It was written by Joe Iconis, but in the show's universe it was written by songwriting team Jimmy Collins (Jeremy Jordan) and Kyle Bishop (Andy Mientus) for their Hit List musical.

In the episode, during a special Hit List preview for potential Broadway producers, the song is sung at the end of the show by Jimmy, Karen Cartwright (Katharine McPhee), Ana Vargas (Krysta Rodriguez) and the Hit List ensemble, as a murdered Amanda's (Karen) spirit walks into the light.

The song is available as a single.

== Grin and Bare It ==
"Grin and Bare It" is an original song introduced in the fifteenth episode of the second season of the musical TV series Smash, entitled "The Transfer". It was written by Smash's in-house songwriters Marc Shaiman and Scott Wittman, but in the show's universe, it was written by songwriting team Tom Levitt (Christian Borle) and Julia Houston (Debra Messing) for some unnamed show during their 11-year partnership.

In the episode, Tom has created a show for a Houston and Levitt tribute and Ivy Lynn (Megan Hilty) performs the song in the persona of a stripper.

The song is available as a single.

== Hang the Moon ==
"Hang the Moon" is an original song introduced in the ninth episode of the second season of the musical TV series Smash, entitled "The Parents". It was written by Marc Shaiman and Scott Wittman, but in the show's universe, it was written by songwriting team Tom Levitt (Christian Borle) and Julia Houston (Debra Messing) for their Marilyn Monroe musical Bombshell.

In the episode, Ivy Lynn (Megan Hilty) and Ivy's mom Leigh Conroy (Bernadette Peters), playing Marilyn Monroe and Marilyn's mom Gladys respectively, are performing this song in rehearsal, with Marilyn visiting her dying mom and Gladys telling her daughter via the song how much she loves her.

The song is available on the cast album Bombshell.

== Heart Shaped Wreckage ==
"Heart Shaped Wreckage" is an original song introduced in the sixth episode of the second season of the musical TV series Smash, entitled "The Fringe". It was written by Julian Emery, Jon Green, James Lawrence Irvin & Lucie Silvas, but within the show's universe, it was written by songwriting team Jimmy Collins (Jeremy Jordan) and Kyle Bishop (Andy Mientus) for their musical Hit List.

In the episode, Act One of Hit List is being presented at a fringe festival. Karen Cartwright (Katharine McPhee), who was supposed to be performing as the lead female, had to miss a previous showing because of the Bombshell musical she's rehearsing for, but showed up for the second and last showing. As she and Jimmy, who's playing the lead male, sing this song, Karen's friend choreographer and director Derek Wills (Jack Davenport), who is watching in the audience, imagines a fantasy version of it, with Karen and Jimmy dressed up and standing on a bridge and Karen with long-flowing hair.

The song is performed again in the seventh episode "Musical Chairs" by Jimmy and Ana Vargas (Krysta Rodriguez) as part of rehearsals.

The song is currently available as a single, with Jeremy Jordan and Katharine McPhee's vocals.

The song has sold 11,000 digital downloads as of March 20, 2013.

== The Higher You Get, the Farther the Fall ==
"The Higher You Get, the Farther the Fall" is an original song introduced in the ninth episode of the first season of the musical TV series Smash, entitled "Hell on Earth". It was written by Marc Shaiman and Scott Wittman, but in the show's universe, it was written by songwriting duo Tom Levitt (Christian Borle) and Julia Houston (Debra Messing) for their musical Heaven on Earth that is on Broadway.

In the episode, Ivy Lynn (Megan Hilty) is part of the ensemble of Heaven on Earth singing the song with star Norbert Leo Butz. The song is performed as a gospel number. We see partial versions of the performance twice in the episode. In the first instance, Ivy is very unhappy that she doesn't have the Marilyn part in the Bombshell musical she is working on and acts bored as this song is performed. In the second instance, Ivy has taken too much of some medication to cope with her circumstances and performs high, disrupting the performance of the song and actually falls on stage. Mortified, she runs out, followed closely behind by Karen Cartwright (Katharine McPhee), who happened to see the performance.

The song has not yet been released for purchase as a single, but a full version of the performance as seen in the episode can be found as a deleted performance for the episode on the DVD set of the first season of the show.

== History Is Made at Night ==
"History is Made at Night" is an original song introduced in the fourth episode of the first season of the musical TV series Smash, entitled "The Cost of Art". It was written by Marc Shaiman and Scott Wittman, but within the show's universe, it was written by the songwriting team of Tom Levitt (Christian Borle) and Julia Houston (Debra Messing) for their Marilyn Monroe musical Bombshell.

== I Can't Let Go ==
"I Can't Let Go" is an original song introduced in the fourth episode of the second season of the musical TV series Smash, entitled "The Song". It was written by Marc Shaiman and Scott Wittman. Within the show's universe, it was written by songwriting team Jimmy Collins (Jeremy Jordan) and Kyle Bishop (Andy Mientus) for their musical Hit List.

In the episode, Broadway star Veronica Moore (Jennifer Hudson) is rehearsing for a one night only concert with the help of Tom Levitt (Christian Borle) and Derek Wills (Jack Davenport) and struggling to figure out the direction that it should take. Karen Cartwright (Katharine McPhee) learns that they are looking for some songs for the show and call Jimmy and Kyle to see if they have a song that can be used and help them get a foot in the door. They come over and try to pitch some of their songs to Tom, who tells them their songs are good, but none of them are right for Veronica's style. Kyle suggests that they'll write a song, even though they only have a few hours to do so. Kyle and Jimmy struggle over the next few hours to come up with a song that's right for Veronica and the show. They eventually finish, but Derek refuses to hear it because Veronica and her mother aren't comfortable with Derek's more sexed-up direction and want to do the songs she usually does. Jimmy storms off and gets high, but Karen convinces him to come back and show that he's got thick enough skin to handle rejection. Meanwhile, Tom has looked at the song and determines that it is really good, and gives it to Derek and convinces him to use it. At the end of the concert, Veronica introduces the song to the audience and sings it, with Jimmy and Kyle watching from backstage and finding out for the first time that their song really is being used. Veronica's performance gets a standing ovation, and she motions to Jimmy and Kyle to come out on stage and she introduces them to the audience (which is also being filmed by the Bravo network), introducing them and their music to a wider audience than they've ever had before.

The song is currently available as a single and has sold 11,000 digital downloads as of March 6, 2013.

== I Heard Your Voice In a Dream ==
"I Heard Your Voice In a Dream" is an original song introduced in the eighth episode of the second season of the musical TV series Smash, entitled "The Bells and Whistles". It was written by Andrew McMahon, but in the show's universe, it was written by songwriting team Jimmy Collins (Jeremy Jordan) and Kyle Bishop (Andy Mientus) for their Hit List musical.

In the episode, the Hit List team is working on staging the song, but Jimmy and Derek Wills (Jack Davenport) are clashing, with Derek wanting a lot of production including video screens and Jimmy wanting something much simpler. In the end, they come to an agreement on using dancers. The song is staged with Jimmy as Jesse symbolically struggling through a mass of people to get to the love of his life Amanda, played by Karen Cartwright (Katharine McPhee), who has stolen his songs and is performing them in concerts.

The song was released as a single to digital retailers and has sold 10,000 digital downloads as of April 3, 2013. The song was nominated for a Primetime Emmy Award for Outstanding Original Music and Lyrics.

== I Never Met a Wolf Who Didn't Love to Howl ==
"I Never Met a Wolf Who Didn't Love to Howl" is an original song introduced in the fourth episode of the musical TV series Smash, entitled "The Cost of Art". The song is written by Marc Shaiman and Scott Wittman, but in the show's universe, it was written by the songwriting duo Tom Levitt (Christian Borle) and Julia Houston (Debra Messing) for their Marilyn Monroe musical Bombshell.

== I'm Not Lost ==
"I'm Not Lost" is an original song introduced in the fourth episode of the second season of the musical TV series Smash, entitled "The Song". It was written by Marc Shaiman and Scott Wittman, but within the show's universe, it was written by songwriting team Jimmy Collins (Jeremy Jordan) and Kyle Bishop (Andy Mientus) for their Hit List musical.

In the episode, as explained above for Chest of Broken Hearts, Jimmy and Kyle go through a list of songs for Tom and Karen to see if one is right for Veronica Moore to use in her concert. After Tom rejects Chest of Broken Hearts, Kyle suggests this song. Karen doesn't know it, so Jimmy sings a portion of it while he plays the piano. He interrupts himself and questions whether Tom is really listening after he glances at his watch. Tom tells him that the song is good but also not right for Veronica.

It has been confirmed by Jeremy Jordan that the song does not exist in full, and that the snippet heard in the episode is all that was written.

== I'm Not Sorry ==
"I'm Not Sorry" is an original song introduced in the fifteenth episode of the second season of the musical TV series Smash, entitled "The Transfer". The song is written by Andrew McMahon, but in the show's universe, it was written by songwriting team Jimmy Collins (Jeremy Jordan) and Kyle Bishop (Andy Mientus) for their musical Hit List.

In the episode, Karen Cartwright (Katharine McPhee) and Daisy Parker (Mara Davi), who is subbing as The Diva for the night, perform the song for Hit List, with Karen's character Amanda in her persona "Nina" and Daisy as The Diva performing at the Video Music Awards in a kind of sing-off.

The song is available as a single.

== Let Me Be Your Star ==
"Let Me Be Your Star" is an original song introduced in the first episode of the first season of the musical TV series Smash, entitled Pilot. It was written by Marc Shaiman and Scott Wittman, but in the show's universe, it was written by songwriting duo Tom Levitt (Christian Borle) and Julia Houston (Debra Messing) for the Marilyn Monroe musical they are working on, Bombshell.

== Let's Be Bad ==
"Let's Be Bad" is an original song introduced in the fifth episode of the first season of the musical TV series Smash, entitled "Let's Be Bad". It was written by Marc Shaiman and Scott Wittman, but within the show's universe, it was written by the songwriting team Tom Levitt (Christian Borle) and Julia Houston (Debra Messing) for the Bombshell musical they are working on about Marilyn Monroe.

In the episode, the setting has Ivy Lynn (Megan Hilty) and the ensemble of Bombshell in a rehearsal room working on the song, while the show cuts away to a fantasy sequence of Ivy as Marilyn Monroe confronting her husband Arthur Miller and studio executives on her lateness and drug habits while trying to make a movie, with the ensemble members as various backup performers.

The song was initially released as a single and is available on the cast albums The Music of Smash and Bombshell.

In 2022, Shaiman and Wittman repurposed the song for Some Like It Hot, the Broadway adaptation of the film of the same name that starred Monroe.

== (Let's Start) Tomorrow Tonight ==
"(Let's Start) Tomorrow Tonight" is an original song introduced in the eighth episode of the second season of the musical TV series Smash, entitled "The Bells and Whistles". It was written by Marc Shaiman and Scott Wittman, but in the show's universe it was written by songwriting team Tom Levitt (Christian Borle) and Julia Houston (Debra Messing) for an uncompleted 60's musical about Vegas they had worked on years ago.

In the episode, Tom's boyfriend Sam Strickland (Leslie Odom, Jr.) has come back to town and Tom offers him a part in the Marilyn Monroe musical Bombshell he and Julia are working on. At a cast party, Sam notices the sheet music for the song. After some discussion of the song's background, Sam sings it in the swinging style of Nat King Cole, with assist from Tom on piano and Tom, Julia, Bobby (Wesley Taylor), and Jessica (Savannah Wise) singing as backup.

The song is available on the cast album Bombshell.

== The Love I Meant to Say ==
"The Love I Meant to Say" is an original song introduced in the fourteenth episode of the second season of the musical TV series Smash, entitled "The Phenomenon". It was written by the show's in-house songwriters Marc Shaiman and Scott Wittman, but in the show's universe, it was written by songwriting team Jimmy Collins (Jeremy Jordan) and Kyle Bishop (Andy Mientus) for their musical Hit List.

In the episode, Kyle has been hit by car and has died. The Hit List cast is very emotional and they decide not to do the show that night. However, ticketholders, who have been told the performance has been canceled, show up anyway. Derek Wills (Jack Davenport) talks to the cast and tells them they can do the show as a concert, just singing the songs and not doing a full performance in costume. Jimmy, who had been best friends with Kyle since childhood and is his writing partner, is devastated and can't perform. During the concert, Karen Cartwright (Katharine McPhee) has just started singing a song when Jimmy shows up. He asks them to bring some staging onto the stage and sings the song very emotionally on some steps, ostensibly to Karen, but also in tribute to Kyle.

The song is available as a single.

== Mama Makes Three ==
"Mama Makes Three" is an original song introduced in the first episode of the second season of the musical TV series Smash, entitled "On Broadway". It was written by Marc Shaiman and Scott Wittman. Within the show's universe, it was written by an unnamed songwriter for the Beautiful musical that Jennifer Hudson's character Veronica Moore is headlining.

In the episode, the setting has Karen Cartwright (Katharine McPhee) and Derek Wills (Jack Davenport attending a performance of Beautiful as two-time Tony winner Veronica sings with an ensemble as her character in the musical has to deal with an interfering mother.

The song is available as a single.

=== Critical reception ===
Noelle Murray of AVClub.com said of the number, "A brief glimpse at the Broadway show Beautiful—starring Veronica “Ronnie” Moore (Jennifer Hudson) as an Etta James-type R&B belter with an overbearing mother—brings the rollicking “Mama Makes Three.”"

== Mr. & Mrs. Smith ==
"Mr. & Mrs. Smith" is an original song introduced in the third episode of the first season of the musical TV series Smash, entitled "Enter Mr. DiMaggio". It was written by Marc Shaiman and Scott Wittman, but within the show's universe, it was written by the songwriting team of Tom Levitt (Christian Borle) and Julia Houston (Debra Messing) for the Bombshell musical they are working on about Marilyn Monroe.

In the episode, the setting has Ivy Lynn (Megan Hilty) and Michael Swift (Will Chase) recording the song in a recording studio, while the show cuts away to a fantasy of Lynn and Swift as Marilyn Monroe and Joe DiMaggio singing the song as a ballad in front of an idealized version of a little house with a white picket fence and their desire to be a normal couple without fame.

The song is also sung in the fourteenth episode of the first season, Previews, by Swift and Rebecca Duvall (Uma Thurman), and in the fifteenth episode of the season, Bombshell, by Swift and Karen Cartwright (Katharine McPhee).

The song was originally released as a single on iTunes and Amazon.com's MP3 story and is a track on the cast albums The Music of Smash and Bombshell, with the Hilty and Chase version for the vocals.

== The National Pastime ==
"The National Pastime" is an original song introduced in the first episode of the first season of the musical TV series Smash, entitled "Pilot". The song was written by Marc Shaiman and Scott Wittman, but in the show's universe, it was written by songwriting duo Tom Levitt (Christian Borle) and Julia Houston (Debra Messing) for their Marilyn Monroe musical Bombshell.

== Never Give All the Heart ==
"Never Give All the Heart" is an original song introduced in the first episode of the first season of the musical TV series Smash, titled "Pilot". The number was written by Marc Shaiman and Scott Wittman, and within the Smash universe the song is depicted as having been written by songwriting duo Julia Houston (Debra Messing) and Tom Levitt (Christian Borle) for a musical based on Marilyn Monroe's life titled Bombshell.

== On Lexington & 52nd Street ==
"On Lexington & 52nd Street" (also "Lexington & 52nd Street") is an original song introduced in the seventh episode of the first season of the musical TV series Smash, entitled "The Workshop". The song is written by Marc Shaiman and Scott Wittman, but in the show's universe, it is written by the songwriting team of Tom Levitt (Christian Borle) and Julia Houston (Debra Messing) for their Marilyn Monroe musical Bombshell.

In "The Workshop", Michael Swift (Will Chase), playing Joe DiMaggio, performs the song as DiMaggio breaks up with his wife Monroe, while Michael is simultaneously breaking up with Julia.

The song was originally released as a single and is available on the cast album Bombshell.

== Original ==
"Original" is an original song introduced in the tenth episode of the second season of the musical TV series Smash, entitled "The Surprise Party". It was written by Pasek and Paul (per the episode's credits), but in the show's universe, it was written by songwriting team Jimmy Collins (Jeremy Jordan) and Kyle Bishop (Andy Mientus) for their Hit List musical.

In the episode, Karen Cartwright (Katharine McPhee) and Jimmy rehearse this Hit List number, with Karen as Amanda performing this number to show her boyfriend Jesse (Jimmy) that she wants to be an original pop star.

The song is available as a single.

== Our Little Secret ==
"Our Little Secret" is an original song introduced in the third episode of the second season of the musical TV series Smash, entitled "The Dramaturg". It was written by Marc Shaiman and Scott Wittman. Within the show's universe, it was written by songwriting team Tom Levitt (Christian Borle) and Julia Houston (Debra Messing) for their Bombshell musical about Marilyn Monroe.

In the episode, Julia is struggling to fix problems with Bombshell's story and at the suggestion of a dramaturg (script doctor), she writes a scene with President John F. Kennedy, as played by an actor named Simon (Julian Ovenden), and Marilyn Monroe, as played by Karen Cartwright (Katharine McPhee), having sex for the first time. In the scene, JFK sings the song as he seduces Marilyn.

Ivy Lynn (Megan Hilty) reprises the song with Simon in the eleventh episode of season 2, "The Dress Rehearsal" as part of Broadway previews for Bombshell.

The song is a track on the cast album Bombshell. McPhee as Marilyn does not sing with Ovenden during the scene on the show, but she does in the album version of the song.

== Pretender ==
"Pretender" is an original song introduced in the fifteenth episode of the second season of the musical TV series Smash, entitled "The Transfer". It was written by Lucie Silvas and Michael Busbee In the show's universe, it was written by songwriting team Jimmy Collins (Jeremy Jordan) and Kyle Bishop (Andy Mientus) for their musical Hit List.

In the episode, Karen Cartwright (Katharine McPhee) performs the song as her Hit List character Amanda, who has taken on a new persona "Nina", performs for Sam Strickland's (Leslie Odom, Jr) manager character to show him what she can do and to get him to be her manager.

The song is available as a single.

== Public Relations ==
"Public Relations" is an original song introduced in the fifth episode of the second season of the musical TV series Smash, entitled "The Read-Through". It was written by Marc Shaiman and Scott Wittman, but within the show's universe, it was written by songwriting team Tom Levitt (Christian Borle) and Julia Houston (Debra Messing) for their Bombshell musical about Marilyn Monroe.

In the episode, Tom and Derek Wills (Jack Davenport) are visiting the theater where Bombshell is supposed to be mounted for its upcoming Broadway run and Tom imagines how the song would be choreographed and performed, with Karen Cartwright (Katharine McPhee) as Marilyn singing to and with the press (with Tom taking several parts) about public relations.

The song is available on the cast album Bombshell.

== Reach For Me ==
"Reach For Me" is an original song introduced in the ninth episode of the second season of the musical TV series Smash, entitled "The Parents". It was written by Andrew McMahon, but in the show's universe, it was written by songwriting team Jimmy Collins (Jeremy Jordan) and Kyle Bishop (Andy Mientus) for their Hit List musical.

In the episode, the Hit List team is presenting some of the musical at a benefit for the Manhattan Theater Workshop, the organization that's sponsoring the musical. Ana Vargas (Krysta Rodriguez) performs this song, using aerobatics and swinging in the air on silk material with various dancers.

The song is available as a single.

== Rewrite This Story ==
"Rewrite This Story" is an original song introduced in the seventh episode of the second season of the musical TV series Smash, entitled "Musical Chairs". It was written by Pasek and Paul, but within the show's universe, it was written by songwriting team Jimmy Collins (Jeremy Jordan) and Kyle Bishop (Andy Mientus) for their Hit List musical.

In the episode, Scott Welker (Jesse L. Martin), the director of the Manhattan Theater Workshop, and choreographer and director Derek Wills (Jack Davenport) are trying to convince Jimmy and Kyle to come up with a new beginning or perhaps a narrator for Hit List to better explain what the show is about to help audience members since it is all singing and no spoken dialogue. Otherwise, the show will be relegated to a much smaller performance area than the main stage. Jimmy is resistant to compromising his work, but after some discussion with others, including Karen Cartwright (Katharine McPhee), who makes some suggestions, Jimmy and Kyle come up with this song, which is then performed as the new opening by Jimmy and Karen (with Derek imagining them performing in front of huge video screens and a lot of spotlights) in front of Scott and his team at the workshop. Scott later tells the Hit List team that his people liked what they saw and Hit List can now be performed on the bigger stage.

The song is reprised in the thirteenth episode of season 2 "The Producers", first by Sam Strickland (Leslie Odom, Jr.) during an audition as understudy for Jimmy, and then by Jimmy (we just see his part of the performance) as part of a Hit List performance. The song is also reprised by Karen in the sixteenth episode of season 2 "The Nominations as part of a Hit List performance (we just see her part of the performance).

The song is available as a single.

== The Right Regrets ==
"The Right Regrets" is an original song introduced in the fifteenth episode of the second season of the musical TV series Smash, entitled "The Transfer". The song is written by the show's in-house songwriters Marc Shaiman and Scott Wittman, but in the show's universe, it was written by songwriting team Tom Levitt (Christian Borle) and Julia Houston (Debra Messing) for their Bombshell musical.

In the episode, Eileen Rand (Anjelica Huston) has planned a Houston and Levitt tribute show to entice Tony voters and Tom is directing it. Julia is unfortunately distracted with helping out Hit List and the rumors about Tom and Julia ending their partnership has gotten out, so there is tension between them. At the end of the tribute show, Julia, who had been detained helping Hit List shows up on stage and she and Tom sing this quiet number.

The song is available on the cast album Bombshell

== Second Hand White Baby Grand ==
"Second Hand White Baby Grand" is an original song introduced in the twelfth episode of the first season of the musical TV series Smash, entitled "Publicity". The song was written by Marc Shaiman and Scott Wittman, but within the show's universe, it is written by songwriting team Julia Houston (Debra Messing) and Tom Levitt (Christian Borle) for their Marilyn Monroe musical Bombshell.

In "Publicity", the song is written after newly appointed Marilyn, Rebecca Duvall (Uma Thurman), requests some script changes. The song is performed by Marilyn Monroe's "shadow selves", the voices that she hears inside her head (which are given much larger roles so the movie star but bad singer Rebecca Duvall doesn't have to sing as many songs). Although the song is originally meant for Karen Cartwright (Katharine McPhee), Ivy Lynn (Megan Hilty) plots against her by making Ellis (Jaime Cepero) send her an anonymous text, telling her that she is no longer needed in rehearsals, even though she is actually required to sing the song. With little time to waste, director and choreographer Derek Wills (Jack Davenport) gives the song to Ivy. The song is sung in the rehearsal room (the introduction being Monroe lying on a therapist's chair while the therapist is asking her to remember her mother), and as the chair is pushed aside, a movable plank of wood that Ivy is standing on is moved centre stage. The song "bleeds over a montage of domestic activity featuring 'Smash' characters". As soon as Ivy finishes the song, Duvall says that Marilyn (i.e. herself) should sing it.

A reprise of the song is performed in the fourteenth episode "Previews" as the second last musical number of Bombshell (the last, until "Don't Forget Me" was written), and is performed by Duvall as Monroe as she lies on her bed, dying.

The song (with Hilty's vocals) was initially released as a single from iTunes and Amazon.com's MP3 store and is available on the cast album Bombshell.

== Smash! ==
"Smash!" is an original song introduced in the fourteenth episode of the first season of the musical TV series Smash, entitled Previews. It was written by Marc Shaiman and Scott Wittman, but in the show's universe, it was written by the songwriting team of Tom Levitt (Christian Borle) and Julia Huston (Debra Messing) for their musical Heaven on Earth and then reworked for Bombshell, the Marilyn Monroe musical they are working on.

In the episode, Karen Cartwright (Katharine McPhee) and Ivy Lynn (Megan Hilty) and the female members of the ensemble perform the song with the actor playing studio head Darryl F. Zanuck (Marc Kudisch) during a Boston preview of Bombshell.

The song is available on the cast album Bombshell.

== Take a Picture... It Lasts Longer ==
"Take a Picture... It Lasts Longer" is an original song intended for the introduction of the character of Veronica Moore (Jennifer Hudson). It was written by Marc Shaiman and Scott Wittman. The full musical performance was filmed for the series, but was cut because according to Josh Safran, production felt the song, "did not service Veronica Moore’s arc." Instead, the musical number Mama Makes Three was written to replace Take A Picture.

The performance, nor the song were ever officially released. But Marc Shaiman did go on to post the original demo of the song performed by Shayna Steele to his website.

== They Just Keep Moving the Line ==
"They Just Keep Moving the Line" is an original song introduced in the second episode of the second season of the musical TV series Smash, entitled "The Fallout". It was written by Marc Shaiman and Scott Wittman. Within the show's fictional setting, it was written by the songwriting team Tom Levitt (Christian Borle) and Julia Houston (Debra Messing) for the Bombshell musical they are working on about Marilyn Monroe.

In the episode, the setting has Ivy Lynn (Megan Hilty) performing the song during a theater wing benefit that Eileen Rand (Anjelica Huston), Derek Wills (Jack Davenport), Ivy, Tom, and Julia have crashed. Tom and Julia convince Ivy to perform the song to impress the audience in order to entice possible investors.

The song is also partially performed by Karen Cartwright (Katharine McPhee) in the third episode of the second season, "The Dramaturg", as Derek works with Karen and the Bombshell ensemble to rehearse the number and figure out the choreography. We also see a partial reprise of the song by Ivy in the same episode, depicted as video playback of a previous rehearsal of the number by Ivy that Tom Levitt is watching.

The song, with Hilty's vocals, is available on the cast album Bombshell.

=== Critical reception ===
Noel Murray of AVClub.com said of the song in her review of "The Fallout" episode, "And right at the end of the almost irredeemable “The Fallout,” Ivy rouses the American Theater Wing crowd with “(They Just Keep) Moving The Line,” a Bombshell song about resurrection that’s so electrifying that I actually muttered “damn” to myself when it was over (and adjusted my grade accordingly)."

== Three On a Match ==
"Three On a Match" is an original song performed in the tenth episode of the first season of Smash, entitled "Understudy." It was written by Marc Shaiman and Scott Wittman. In the show's universe, it was written by the songwriting duo Tom Levitt (Christian Borle) and Julia Houston (Debra Messing) for their very first musical Three On a Match.

In the episode, as part of their celebration of the tenth anniversary of their work partnership, Tom and Julia find a high school production of the musical and watch it from the audience. Only the last few bars of the song are performed.

It is unknown if the song exists in full and it has not yet been released for purchase.

== Touch Me ==
"Touch Me" is an original song introduced in the eighth episode of the first season of the musical TV series Smash, entitled "The Coup". It is written by Ryan Tedder and Bonnie McKee. In the show's universe, the song is written by Tedder, who plays himself.
