= Smash season 2 =

Second season of the television series Smash

Smash
- Season 2
- Season 2 poster
- No. of episodes: 17

Release
- Original network: NBC
- Original release: February 5 – May 26, 2013

Season chronology
- ← Previous; Season 1

The second and final season of the American musical drama television series Smash premiered on February 5, 2013, on NBC and consisted of 17 episodes. On March 13, 2013, NBC announced they were moving the remaining season two episodes of Smash to Saturday nights at 9:00PM EST starting April 6 in order to play the full 17-episode order. The two-hour series finale aired on May 26, 2013, moving the show to a special Sunday slot.

== Production ==
On March 22, 2012, NBC renewed Smash for a second season. Gossip Girl's Joshua Safran replaced creator Theresa Rebeck as showrunner, since Rebeck departed to focus on other projects. Rebeck did not return to the show in any capacity. However, she remained credited as executive producer.

Not returning to the cast from the previous season were Jaime Cepero (Ellis), Raza Jaffrey (Dev), Brian d'Arcy James (Frank), and recurring cast member Will Chase (Michael), although James did make guest appearances in the first episode of season 2 and the series finale. Jeremy Jordan joined the series in the role of Jimmy. Academy Award winner Jennifer Hudson had a recurring role as Veronica Moore, a Tony award-winning actress who affects the lives of Karen and Ivy. Jesse L. Martin was cast in a six-episode arc as Scott Nichols, the Manhattan Theatre Workshop's artistic director, whose story affected most of the cast.

New Smash show runner/executive producer Josh Safran noted about the show's movement to Saturdays starting April 6 meant NBC was choosing to cancel the series, Safran said he was "saddened" and surprised by the move, "We're all aware the show is not successful, but I guess I had hoped we would see what happened when The Voice came back [or] maybe they'd move us to a better time slot. But I understand from the network's point of view. We hit a number and we stuck there." Safran said of the final episodes would be constructed as a series finale, "I don't want [viewers] to think they are going to be left hanging, because they won't be," he assures. "The season has a beginning, middle and an end... [And] it just gets better and better." Safran also said he and the other producers were still proud of the series. The two hour series finale aired on May 26, 2013.

Smash's second season is a production of Universal Television in association with DreamWorks Television. The series has a large number of executive producers including Steven Spielberg, Craig Zadan, Neil Meron, Rebeck, Darryl Frank and Justin Falvey. Marc Shaiman and Scott Wittman serve as the composers and executive producers.

== Cast and characters ==
=== Regular ===
- Debra Messing as Julia Houston, a successful Broadway lyricist and the musical's co-writer. She is married with a son, but had an affair with Michael Swift, who played Joe DiMaggio in the initial Marilyn workshop. Houston is based on creator Theresa Rebeck.
- Jack Davenport as Derek Wills, the director of the musical, who will stop at nothing to make the show a success. He has an on-and-off relationship with Marilyn workshop star Ivy Lynn, though he has also shown interest in Karen Cartwright and had a physical relationship with Rebecca Duvall during the Boston preview before she left the show.
- Katharine McPhee as Karen Cartwright, an ingenue from Iowa, who lands a successful audition and becomes a serious contender for the role of Monroe. Somewhat new to show business, her naiveté is generally scorned by her peers, though her talent is rarely called into question. She played Marilyn for the Boston preview, when Rebecca Duvall left.
- Christian Borle as Tom Levitt, a theatrical composer and Julia's longtime songwriting partner. He and Derek Wills have an acrimonious relationship stemming from a business fallout 11 years ago. Tom briefly dates a Republican lawyer but later becomes attracted to Sam Strickland, a dancer in the ensemble of Bombshell.
- Megan Hilty as Ivy Lynn, a seasoned performer who, at the beginning of the series, is working in the ensemble of Heaven On Earth, another Broadway musical that Tom and Julia wrote. Ivy is favored by nearly everyone on board with the production to play Marilyn Monroe, but after the workshop flops, she is replaced by a big movie star. Throughout the show, she's in an on-and-off relationship with the Bombshell director Derek Wills and finds herself constantly competing with Karen in many different situations, eventually losing the role of Marilyn to her for the Boston preview.
- Anjelica Huston as Eileen Rand, the musical's tenacious producer, who is dealing with divorce proceedings from her husband, Jerry, which could threaten the musical and forces her to think outside the box in securing funds for the show. A running gag throughout the series is Eileen throwing drinks into Jerry's face.
- Leslie Odom Jr. as Sam Strickland, an ensemble member, a good friend of Ivy who is gay and very much into sports. Due to their mutual friendship with Ivy, he forms a connection with Tom.
- Jeremy Jordan as Jimmy Collins, a working-class man from Brooklyn who is on the brink of self-destruction.
- Andy Mientus as Kyle Bishop, a poor kid from Brooklyn with dreams of writing for Broadway.
- Krysta Rodriguez as Ana Vargas, Karen's new roommate who is looking for her big break.

=== Recurring ===
- Jennifer Hudson as Veronica Moore, a Tony Award-winning Broadway star who has had to pay a price to reach her Broadway dream.
- Ann Harada as Linda, the stage manager of the musical.
- Becky Ann Baker as Karen's mother.
- Dylan Baker as Roger Cartwright, Karen's father.
- Michael Cristofer as Jerry Rand, Eileen's soon-to-be ex-husband and former producing partner.
- Wesley Taylor as Bobby, an ensemble member who is not afraid to say what is on his mind. He is a friend of Ivy and later, Karen.
- Savannah Wise as Jessica, an ensemble member and friend of Ivy and later, Karen.
- Jenny Laroche as Sue, an ensemble member and friend of Ivy and later, Karen.
- Thorsten Kaye as Nick Felder, Eileen's boyfriend who is sent to jail early in the season.
- Daniel Sunjata as Peter, a dramaturg (script doctor), who is brought in to help Julia iron out problems with the Bombshell script.
- Nikki Blonsky as Margot, Jerry Rand's assistant.
- Daphne Rubin-Vega as Agnes, Bombshell's publicist.
- Emory Cohen as Leo, Julia's son
- Brian d'Arcy James as Frank, Julia's husband.
- Mara Davi as Daisy Parker

=== Special guest stars ===
- Sean Hayes as Terrence "Terry" Falls, a comedic television and film star who is making his Broadway debut in the musical Liaisons, based on Les liaisons dangereuses.
- Sheryl Lee Ralph as Cynthia Moore, mother and manager to Veronica Moore.
- Luke Macfarlane as Patrick Dillon
- Liza Minnelli as herself.
- Bernadette Peters as Leigh Conroy. Reprising her Season 1 role, as Ivy's mother.
- Jesse L. Martin as Scott Nichols, artistic director of the Manhattan Theatre Workshop, Julia's new love interest.
- Jamey Sheridan as Richard Francis, an editor at the New York Times, Eileen's new love interest.
- Rosie O'Donnell as herself.
- Lin-Manuel Miranda as himself.

=== Cameos ===
- Brenda Braxton, Tony-nominated actress
- Jordan Roth, President of Jujamcyn Theatres
- Michael Riedel, theatre columnist for the New York Post
- Harvey Fierstein, Broadway theatre/film actor/writer
- Annaleigh Ashford, Broadway actress
- Brynn O'Malley, Broadway actress
- Mara Davi, Broadway actress
- Margo Martindale, acclaimed Broadway actress
- Bernie Telsey, famed Broadway casting director ("The Dramaturg")
- Matt Bogart, Broadway actor of Jersey Boys ("The Dramaturg")
- Tom Galantich, Broadway actor ("The Dramaturg")
- Jon Robin Baitz, acclaimed playwright ("The Read-Through")
- Kathy Fitzgerald, Broadway actress of The Producers and 9 to 5: The Musical ("Musical Chairs")
- Seth Rudetsky, Broadway radio host and Playbill.com video blogger ("Musical Chairs")
- Edward Hibbert, Broadway and television actor ("Opening Night")
- Donna McKechnie, Tony Award-winning actress, dancer, and choreographer ("Opening Night")
- Scott Wittman, Broadway and television composer (and "Smash" composer) ("Opening Night")
- Marc Shaiman, Broadway and television composer (and "Smash" composer) ("Opening Night")
- Kathie Lee Gifford, host of NBC's Today Show ("The Producers")
- Frank DiLella, producer and reporter for On Stage ("The Phenomenon")
- Lindsay Mendez, Broadway actress of Godspell, Dogfight and Wicked ("The Transfer")
- Lin-Manuel Miranda, Broadway actor and composer of In the Heights and Bring it On ("The Transfer")
- Michael Musto, former editor of The Village Voice ("The Nominations")
- Mary Testa, Broadway actress of 42nd Street and Xanadu ("The Nominations")
- Dee Hoty, Broadway actress of City of Angels, The Will Rogers Follies and Mamma Mia! ("The Nominations")
- Cheyenne Jackson, Broadway actor of All Shook Up and Xanadu ("The Nominations")
- Christine Ebersole, two time Tony winner and Broadway actress of 42nd Street and Grey Gardens ("The Nominations")
- Lillias White, Broadway actress of How to Succeed, Chicago and Fela! ("The Tonys")
- Ron Rifkin, Broadway actor of Cabaret ("The Tonys")
- Kathleen Marshall, Tony-nominated director/choreographer for Wonderful Town, The Pajama Game, and Anything Goes ("The Tonys")
- Marin Mazzie, Broadway actress of Kiss Me, Kate and Next to Normal ("The Tonys")
- Susan Blackwell, Broadway.com video blogger and Broadway actress of title of show ("The Tonys")

== Episodes ==
| No. overall | No. in season | Title | Directed by | Written by | Original release date | US viewers (millions) |
|---|---|---|---|---|---|---|
| 16 | 1 | "On Broadway" | Michael Morris | Joshua Safran | February 5, 2013 | 4.48 |
Bombshell returns to New York in hopes of landing a theater for its Broadway debut, but a new scandal puts its fate in jeopardy.
| 17 | 2 | "The Fallout" | Craig Zisk | Julie Rottenberg & Elisa Zuritsky | February 5, 2013 | 4.45 |
The creative team behind Bombshell struggle to repair their personal and professional reputations following allegations of legal improprieties. Karen encounters resistance when she tries to help a new writing team working on their first musical.
| 18 | 3 | "The Dramaturg" | Larry Shaw | Bryan Goluboff | February 19, 2013 | 3.29 |
Eileen introduces Tom and Julia to a new writing partner in order to fix Bombshell's script; Karen confers with Derek about Jimmy and Kyle's musical that they are working on; Derek tries to get reinstated as the director for The Wiz remake with Veronica Moore.
| 19 | 4 | "The Song" | Michael Morris | Bathsheba Doran | February 26, 2013 | 3.04 |
Derek and Tom help Veronica with her one-night-only concert, while Jimmy and Kyle, with Karen's encouragement, try to get a song submitted for the concert, and Julia and Peter struggle to work together to fix Bombshell's script.
| 20 | 5 | "The Read-Through" | David Petrarca | Liz Tuccillo | March 5, 2013 | 2.68 |
Julia and Peter prepare for a reading of Bombshell, but Julia worries that she can't trust him, while Jimmy and Kyle prepare for an informal reading of Hit List. Meanwhile, Ivy must deal with comedian and movie star Terry Falls who is not taking Liaisons very seriously.
| 21 | 6 | "The Fringe" | Dan Lerner | Julia Brownell | March 12, 2013 | 2.90 |
Derek reaches his breaking point and quits Bombshell, Kyle and Jimmy struggle to show Hit List at the Fringe Festival, and Ivy works up the courage to tell Terry what she thinks of Liaisons.
| 22 | 7 | "Musical Chairs" | Casey Nicholaw | Becky Mode | March 19, 2013 | 2.66 |
Karen, Tom, Julia and Derek adapt to a new environment. Pressure mounts at Liaisons. Katie's assistance leads Eileen to discover how to salvage Bombshell.
| 23 | 8 | "The Bells and Whistles" | Craig Zisk | Noelle Valdivia | March 26, 2013 | 3.05 |
Ivy brings Sam back to New York City which makes things uncomfortable for Tom. Jimmy finds himself at odds with Derek regarding Hit List. Ana and Karen struggle with being assertive.
| 24 | 9 | "The Parents" | Tricia Brock | Jordon Nardino | April 2, 2013 | 2.98 |
After Leigh Conroy returns to join the cast of Bombshell, Tom finds himself struggling to defuse the years of tension between her and her daughter, Ivy. Jimmy and Karen's connection is threatened by both Ana’s new-found success and an unexpected visitor. Derek learns more about Jimmy's past just as the public sees their first piece of Hit List.
| 25 | 10 | "The Surprise Party" | S. J. Clarkson | Julie Rottenberg & Elisa Zuritsky | April 6, 2013 | 1.88 |
With Liza Minnelli in town, Tom plans a surprise for Ivy in an attempt to find a balance between their work life and their friendship. Relations between Karen, Jimmy, and Derek explode just as Hit List's rehearsal process nears its close. While Richard asks Eileen to spend less time at work and more time with him, Julia finds herself also pulled away from Bombshell by an unlikely source.
| 26 | 11 | "The Dress Rehearsal" | Mimi Leder | Julia Brownell | April 13, 2013 | 1.80 |
As Tom and Julia race to ready Bombshell for previews, Tom's eagerness to prove himself may not be the best thing for the show. An on-stage mishap forces Ivy to make an important decision, while tension rises at Hit List as Karen becomes suspicious of Derek's motives towards her.
| 27 | 12 | "Opening Night" | Michael Morris | Bathsheba Doran & Noelle Valdivia | April 20, 2013 | 1.91 |
After months of hurdles, Bombshell's opening night is here. As Ivy's nerves get the better of her, support comes from an unlikely source. Meanwhile, Tom and Julia look to their next project. Bombshell's success may be in jeopardy as Eileen's issues with Richard come to a head. Jimmy finally reveals all to Karen about his dark past, but is it too little too late?
| 28 | 13 | "The Producers" | Tricia Brock | Becky Mode | April 27, 2013 | 1.89 |
An off-the-rail Jimmy threatens Hit List's future, as Karen, Derek, Ana and Kyle join forces to try help him before things take a turn for the worse. Tom and Julia's partnership is at breaking point just as Ivy, Eileen, and the entire Bombshell team are running themselves ragged to outshine their competitors.
| 29 | 14 | "The Phenomenon" | Roxann Dawson | Jordon Nardino & Joshua Safran | May 4, 2013 | 2.28 |
An unexpected event bonds the two musicals.
| 30 | 15 | "The Transfer" | Holly Dale | Justin Brenneman & Julia Brownell | May 11, 2013 | 2.01 |
Tom has his sights on the Tony and pulls out all the stops at a Houston & Levitt tribute night, but can Julia turn away from "Hit List" long enough to help? Scared of damaging her reputation, Tom asks Ivy to perform a risqué number. "Hit List" arrives on Broadway but immediately find trouble with Derek being blackmailed to give away The Diva's role.
| 31 | 16 | "The Nominations (Part 1)" | Michael Morris | Bryan Goluboff | May 26, 2013 | 2.44 |
The Tony nominations loom, but keeping your eye on the prize can be hard for both shows. Tom crosses an influential Tony voter, Ivy copes with some very distracting news and Derek's past has repercussions.
| 32 | 17 | "The Tonys (Part 2)" | Michael Morris | Joshua Safran | May 26, 2013 | 2.44 |
It's Tony night! And the awards might not provide the answers everyone is looking for. Jimmy faces a final reckoning and Tom, Julia, Derek, Karen, Ivy and Eileen wait to see if the awards will confirm their place in the Broadway pantheon once and for all.
