= The Nominations =

- Smash episode
- Episode no.: Season 2 Episode 16
- Directed by: Michael Morris
- Written by: Bryan Goluboff
- Production code: 216
- Original air date: May 26, 2013

Guest appearances
- Michael Cristofer as Jerry Rand; Brian D'Arcy James as Frank Houston; Daphne Rubin-Vega as Agnes; Mara Davi as Daisy Parker; Cheyenne Jackson as himself; Christine Ebersole as herself; Michael Riedel as himself; Michael Musto as himself

Episode chronology
← Previous "The Transfer"	Next → "The Tonys"
- Smash (season 2)

"The Nominations" is the thirty first episode of the American television series Smash. It was written by Bryan Goluboff and directed by Michael Morris. The episode premiered on NBC on May 26, 2013, the sixteenth episode of Season 2. It was the first part of a two-part series finale.

== Plot ==
It is the week of the Tony Award nominations, and Ana Vargas (Krysta Rodriguez) has sued Jerry Rand Productions and Derek Wills (Jack Davenport) for wrongful termination, threatening to publicize the suit. In an attempt to smooth things over, Derek arranges for Ana to audition for a part in the 'Once' tour. Meanwhile, Hit List has practically swept the Outer Critics Circle awards. Also, the Tony Nominations are in and ''Bombshell'' receives twelve nominations while ''Hit List'' gets thirteen.

== Production ==
The episode featured three songs, two covers ("Feelin' Alright" by Traffic and "If You Want Me" from the musical Once) and one original, a reprise. "Rewrite This Story" was an original written by Pasek and Paul.

"Feelin' Alright" and "If You Want Me" are available on the cast album "The Music of Smash: The Complete Season 2", available digitally. "Rewrite This Story" was previously made available as a digital single and is also available on the digital cast album "The Music of Smash: The Complete Season 2".

== Critical reception ==
Michael Slezak of TVLine reviewed the episode (together with the last episode since it was a 2-hour finale) and gave it a mostly positive review. Hillary Busis from Entertainment Weekly also gave the episode a mostly positive review (also reviewing it together with the last episode).
