= Opening Night (Smash) =

- Smash episode
- Episode no.: Season 2 Episode 12
- Directed by: Michael Morris
- Written by: Bathsheba Doran and Noelle Valdivia
- Production code: 212
- Original air date: April 20, 2013

Guest appearances
- Jesse L. Martin as Scott Nichols; * Jamey Sheridan as Richard Francis : Julian Ovenden as Simon; David Call as Adam; Bernadette Peters as Leigh Conroy; Rosie O'Donnell as herself; Daphne Rubin-Vega as Agnes; Emory Cohen as Leo Houston; Mara Davi as Daisy Parker; Marc Shaiman as himself; Scott Wittman as himself

Episode chronology
← Previous "The Dress Rehearsal"	Next → "The Producers"
- Smash (season 2)

"Opening Night" is the twenty seventh episode of the American television series Smash. It was written by Bathsheba Doran and Noelle Valdivia and directed by Michael Morris. The episode premiered on NBC on April 20, 2013, the twelfth episode of Season 2. After months of hurdles, Bombshell's opening night is here. As Ivy's nerves get the better of her, support comes from an unlikely source. Meanwhile, Tom and Julia look to their next project. Bombshell's success may be in jeopardy as Eileen's issues with Richard come to a head. Jimmy reveals all to Karen about his dark past.

== Plot ==
Ivy Lynn (Megan Hilty) is suddenly very nervous just before she goes on for Bombshell's opening night. Her mom Leigh Conroy (Bernadette Peters) tells her not to worry and that she's very proud of her. Ivy brings down the house.

Karen Cartwright (Katharine McPhee) and Ana Vargas (Krysta Rodriguez) are still not on good speaking terms, but Ana tells her that she met Adam (David Call), who says he's Jimmy's brother and that Jimmy is bad news. Jimmy Collins (Jeremy Jordan) tells Kyle Bishop (Andy Mientus) that he wants to come clean with Karen about his sordid past.

Tom Levitt (Christian Borle) and Julia Houston (Debra Messing) are having trouble deciding what project they want to do next. Tom gets an offer to direct a revival of City of Angels and he seriously considers it. Julia tells him she's getting the rights to do The Great Gatsby, which they wanted to do when they first met, but Tom demurs. Julia hears about the directing job and lays into Tom for not telling her the truth. He says he loves writing with her, but directing is what he wants to do right now.

At Bombshell's premiere before the show starts, Jimmy tells Karen about his past, that he was abused as a kid. After his mom died, his brother Adam got him on the streets selling and using drugs and that he wasn't a good person. He says Kyle saved him and is his real brother and Adam means nothing to him. At the after-party, Jimmy sees Adam with Ana and wants to fight him, but Karen asks him to behave. Kyle gets up the courage to tell Adam to leave and then pushes him. Jimmy jumps in and punches Adam who fights back. Eileen breaks it up with a cold ice bucket. Karen tells Jimmy she's not happy with how he handled the altercation and says she's done with him because he's not willing to change.

Also at the after-party, Karen goes to the ladies room and runs into Ivy. Karen tells her that she felt jealous that Ivy had the role and that she did great. They make up. Later at the party, Ivy thanks various people and also thanks Karen and asks her to perform a number with her; they perform a rousing version of "That's Life". Afterwards, Ivy finds out that Derek Wills (Jack Davenport) asked Karen out a few weeks ago and she turned him down. Ivy is a little put out because that's when she and Derek started seeing each other again. She spurns his offer to spend the night without telling him why.

The reviews are mostly very positive, though producer Eileen Rand (Anjelica Huston) is not really happy with The New York Times' slightly more tepid reviews and tells the editor Richard Francis (Jamey Sheridan) that she doesn't want to see him anymore. Her publicist Agnes (Daphne Rubin-Vega) thinks their publicity campaign should be cautious given the Times review, but Eileen decides to double down on the promo budget and says they'll go for Tony nominations to increase excitement for the show.

Derek runs into Daisy Parker (Mara Davi), who previously sued him for sexual harassment. She apologizes to him for the suit and says she was part of it only to help further her career. He asks her what she's doing right now and they go off together.

Julia and Scott Nichols (Jesse L. Martin) are in a car after the party and after Julia tells him of her and Tom's troubles, he suggests she do Gatsby at his theater and then kisses her.

Tom is drinking alone at a restaurant and Kyle runs into him. They talk a bit and Tom asks him if he wants to leave with him. Kyle hesitates and says he should check on Jimmy, but then accepts Tom's offer and they leave together.

== Production ==
There were several star cameos in the episode. Actress/comedian Rosie O'Donnell played herself as one of Bombshell's audience members. Songwriters Marc Shaiman and Scott Wittman (who also write songs for and are executive producers of Smash) played themselves, also in attendance to see Bombshell. Shaiman is also drafted by Ivy to play piano for the performance of "That's Life". Emory Cohen reprised his role as Julia's son Leo, even though he had been let go from the cast after the first season.

There were two songs featured in the episode, one original (a reprise) and one cover ("That's Life", mostly popularized by Frank Sinatra). The show's in-house songwriters Marc Shaiman and Scott Wittman wrote the reprised "Don't Forget Me" (sung by Megan Hilty). "That's Life" was sung by Katharine McPhee and Hilty.

"That's Life" was released as a single the same week the episode aired. "Don't Forget Me" with McPhee's vocals is currently available on the cast album Bombshell.

== Critical reception ==
Michael Slezak of TVLine said of the episode, "Without a doubt, though, this was Smash‘s very best episode this season — even with Leo back in the mix!"
