= The Tonys (Smash) =

- Smash episode
- Episode no.: Season 2 Episode 17
- Directed by: Michael Morris
- Written by: Joshua Safran
- Production code: 217
- Original air date: May 26, 2013

Guest appearances
- Bernadette Peters as Leigh Conroy; Michael Cristofer as Jerry Rand; Brian D'Arcy James as Frank Houston; Luke Macfarlane as Patrick Dillon; Thorsten Kaye as Nick; Mara Davi as Daisy Parker; Lillias White as herself; Ron Rifkin as himself; Rosie O'Donnell as herself; Marin Mazzie as herself; Kathleen Marshall as herself; Will Chase as Michael Swift

Episode chronology
← Previous "The Nominations"	Next → —
- Smash (season 2)

"The Tonys" is the thirty-second episode of the American television series, Smash. It was written by Smash's show-runner and head writer, Joshua Safran, and directed by Michael Morris. The episode premiered on NBC, on May 26, 2013, the 17th episode of Season 2. It was the second part of a two-part series finale.

== Plot ==
At the Tony Awards ceremony, Bombshell won several awards including Best Musical, Best Original Score for Tom and Julia (their first win) and Best Lead Actress in a Musical for Ivy. Hit List won several awards, including Best Book for a Musical for the late Kyle Bishop, Best Featured Actress in a Musical for Daisy Parker, and Best Choreography for Derek.

After the ceremony, Jimmy tells Karen that five years ago, he did some drugs with a girl he barely knew; she overdosed. He ran away and hid with Kyle and Adam and changed his name. After getting himself together, he turned himself in to the police. He discovered that the girl who overdosed was fine; however, he was being charged with distribution of a controlled substance and facing 6–18 months of jail-time. He told Karen that he wanted to be a better man and that facing up to his past would help. He paid bail but needed to go back to the police station that night.

Tom and Julia agree to work on a movie musical with Patrick.

At the end of the show, Karen and Ivy perform "Big Finish" for the Tony audience; the performance is designed for the television audience as well. There is a montage of the various characters: Jimmy and Karen kiss in front of the police station as he heads in, Derek and Ivy hug as he strokes her stomach (implying she told him about the baby), Julia shows up at Michael Swift's door, and Karen and Ana hug as they look at Kyle's Tony award (as Jimmy has gone back to the police station).

== Production ==
The episode featured three songs, one cover ("Under Pressure" by Queen and David Bowie) and two originals, one a reprise. "Broadway, Here I Come!", the reprise, was written by Joe Iconis. "Big Finish" was written by the show's in-house songwriters Marc Shaiman and Scott Wittman.

The reprise of "Broadway, Here I Come!" as an a cappella version with vocals by the Hit List cast, "Under Pressure" and "Big Finish" are available on the cast album The Music of Smash: The Complete Season 2, available digitally.

== Critical reception ==
Michael Slezak of TVLine reviewed the episode (together with"The Nominations" episode since it was a 2-hour finale) and gave it a mostly positive review. Hillary Busis from Entertainment Weekly also gave the episode a mostly positive review (reviewed with "The Nominations" episode).
