= The Fringe (Smash) =

- Smash episode
- Episode no.: Season 2 Episode 6
- Directed by: Dan Lerner
- Written by: Julia Brownell
- Production code: 206
- Original air date: March 12, 2013

Guest appearances
- Sean Hayes as Terry Falls; Jesse L. Martin as Scott Nichols; Daniel Sunjata as Peter Gillman; Michael Cristofer as Jerry Rand; Nikki Blonsky as Margo

Episode chronology
← Previous "The Read-Through"	Next → "Musical Chairs"
- Smash (season 2)

"The Fringe" is the twenty first episode of the American television series Smash. It was written by Julia Brownell and directed by Dan Lerner. The episode premiered on NBC on March 12, 2013, the sixth episode of Season 2. In this episode, Derek reaches his breaking point and quits Bombshell, Kyle and Jimmy struggle to show Hit List at the Fringe Festival, and Ivy works up the courage to tell Terry what she thinks of Liaisons.

== Plot ==
Eileen Rand (Anjelica Huston) has chosen Tom Levitt's (Christian Borle) and her ex-husband and current Bombshell producer Jerry's (Michael Christofer) preferred version of Bombshell over Julia Houston's (Debra Messing) and Peter's (Daniel Sunjata) excellent updated script, and Derek Wills (Jack Davenport) and Julia are mad about it, and Derek sulks a great deal. When Tom stages an uptempo version of "Never Give All the Heart" with Karen Cartwright (Katharine McPhee), thus crossing into Derek's directing territory, Derek finally reaches his breaking point and quits the show.

Meanwhile, Jimmy Collins (Jeremy Jordan), Kyle Bishop (Andy Mientus), Ana Vargas (Krysta Rodriguez), and Karen work to get Hit List ready for two days of performances at the Fringe Festival, singing "This Will Be Our Year" as they ready a stage. Karen has to back out of the first day's performance when Jerry demands that she can't be in another show while doing Bombshell. The first day's performance doesn't go well and Jimmy and Kyle brood about it. Karen takes a risk and shows up for the 2nd day's performance and she and Jimmy perform "Heart Shaped Wreckage" and the crowd loves it. Scott Nichols (Jesse L. Martin) shows up and offers space at his Manhattan Theater Workshop for the show. Derek declares that he's the show's director when Scott asks if they have one.

Over at Liaisons, Ivy Lynn (Megan Hilty) tries to deal with an increasingly erratic Terry Falls (Sean Hayes). She decides to throw caution to the wind and sings her song, "A Letter From Cecile" in a comedic style, upstaging Terry with the visiting press. Terry decides to cut her song and Ivy cries about it. Terry finds her upset and they have a heart to heart talk. Ivy convinces him that the show is bad and that they need to make changes. He asks the cast for feedback and they finally get up the courage to tell him that the show is bad. He tells them that he understands and they decide to work on making the changes they can.

== Production ==
There were four songs featured in the episode, three originals (one a reprise) and one cover ("This Will Be Our Year" by The Zombies). Of the originals, the show's in-house songwriters Marc Shaiman and Scott Wittman wrote "A Letter From Cecile" and the reprised "Never Give All the Heart", while "Heart Shaped Wreckage" was written by Julian Emery, Jon Green, James Lawrence Irvin and Lucie Silvas.

"A Letter From Cecile", "This Will Be Our Year" and "Heart Shaped Wreckage" were released as singles for sale from iTunes and Amazon.com's MP3 store. "Never Give All the Heart" is available on the cast album Bombshell.

== Critical reception ==
Sara Brady from Television Without Pity gave the episode a C+ rating.
