= The Read-Through =

- Smash episode
- Episode no.: Season 2 Episode 5
- Directed by: David Petrarca
- Written by: Liz Tuccillo
- Production code: 205
- Original air date: March 5, 2013

Guest appearances
- Sean Hayes as Terry Falls; Daniel Sunjata as Peter Gillman; Michael Cristofer as Jerry Rand; Thorsten Kaye as Nick; Nikki Blonsky as Margo

Episode chronology
| ← Previous "The Song" | Next → "The Fringe" |
- Smash (season 2)

"The Read-Through" is the twentieth episode of the American television series Smash. It was written by Liz Tuccillo and directed by David Petrarca. The episode premiered on NBC on March 5, 2013, the fifth episode of Season 2. Julia and Peter prepare for a reading of Bombshell, but Julia worries that she can't trust him, while Jimmy and Kyle prepare for an informal reading of Hit List. Meanwhile, Ivy must deal with comedian and movie star Terry Falls who is not taking Liaisons very seriously.

== Plot ==
While things are being decided about Bombshell, Tom Levitt (Christian Borle) and Derek Wills (Jack Davenport) visit a stage and Tom imagines how a Bombshell song "Public Relations" would be choreographed, with Karen Cartwright (Katharine McPhee) singing as Marilyn and Tom playing various journalist types.

Julia Houston (Debra Messing) and Peter (Daniel Sunjata) feverishly work to finish the new script for Bombshell so they can do a read-through with Eileen Rand (Anjelica Huston), Jerry Rand (Michael Cristofer), Derek, and Tom. Because of gossip she heard, Julia worries that she can't trust Peter and that he'll mess with her by writing a new script and take credit for it. The read-through of the script goes very well. Jerry thinks it's a terrific script, but he won't produce Bombshell with that script. He doesn't think a story about Marilyn as told through the men she was involved with would make a good Broadway musical. It turns out Tom feels the same way, as he sent an older draft to Jerry that they both liked. Tom, Jerry, Julia, Peter, and Derek argue about it and decide to let Eileen make the final decision. The episode ends before she announces her decision.

Karen and roommate Ana Vargas (Krysta Rodriguez) discuss Karen's attraction to songwriter Jimmy Collins (Jeremy Jordan) and what his kiss (in the previous episode) meant. Ana says that Jimmy is hot and talented but a player and suggests Karen keep their relationship just to business. Karen and Ana meet Jimmy and his writing partner and friend Kyle Bishop (Andy Mientus) and suggest a read-through of their Hit List musical with friends. Things get awkward when a female overnight guest of Jimmy's comes into the room for coffee. The reading is held later in the day (including Jimmy reprising part of "Caught in the Storm") and the participants reluctantly tell Kyle and Jimmy that while the songs are great, the dialogue is terrible. Afterwards, Kyle feels bad and they discuss what to do. Karen suggests that they change the script to be all singing and Kyle and Jimmy agree and decide to get it ready for a reading at a fringe festival the following week that Derek had suggested. Karen sings "Some Boys" while trying to figure out her relationship with Jimmy. Jimmy, after a warning from Ana, suggests to Karen that they keep their relationship to just business.

Ivy Lynn (Megan Hilty) is rehearsing with the cast of Liaisons when the star Terry Falls (Sean Hayes) finally arrives, after a week's delay. He seems confused by the tone of the show and starts to play it as a comedy. Ivy talks to him and suggests to him that the show is really a drama. He seems to get it, but the next rehearsal, the producer says he's talked with Terry and says the tone should be more comedic. Ivy plays her part with drama, which seems to shock Terry and he runs out. He later asks Ivy how she can feel so deeply and she tries to give him advice. He suggests that he wants to feel the material as emotionally as she does, so he tells her he has stopped all his medication so he can do better in the role and feel it more. Needless to say, Ivy is worried.

== Production ==
There were three songs featured in the episode, two originals (one a reprise) and one cover ("Some Boys" by Death Cab for Cutie). Of the originals, the show's in-house songwriters Marc Shaiman and Scott Wittman wrote "Public Relations", while Pasek and Paul wrote the reprised "Caught in the Storm".

"Some Boys" was released as a single for sale from iTunes and Amazon.com's MP3 store, while "Public Relations" is available on the cast album Bombshell. "Caught in the Storm" was released for a previous episode.

== Critical reception ==
Sara Brady from Television Without Pity gave the episode a C rating.
