= The Transfer (Smash) =

- Smash episode
- Episode no.: Season 2 Episode 15
- Directed by: Holly Dale
- Written by: Justin Brenneman & Julia Brownell
- Production code: 215
- Original air date: May 11, 2013

Guest appearances
- Lin-Manuel Miranda as himself; Daphne Rubin-Vega as Agnes; Mara Davi as Daisy Parker; Lindsay Mendez as herself

Episode chronology
← Previous "The Phenomenon"	Next → "The Nominations"
- Smash (season 2)

"The Transfer" is the thirtieth episode of the American television series Smash. It was written by Justin Brenneman and Julia Brownell and directed by Holly Dale. The episode premiered on NBC on May 11, 2013, the fifteenth episode of Season 2.

== Plot ==
The episode opens with Hit List moving to Broadway and being in previews. Karen Cartwright (Katharine McPhee) sings "Pretender" in a Hit List number as Amanda's alter ego "Nina" performs for Sam Strickland's (Leslie Odom Jr.) manager character, who "Nina" is trying to get to be her manager. He introduces her to the Diva, played by Ana Vargas (Krysta Rodriguez), who fumbles her entrance and comes in late. Derek Wills (Jack Davenport) is concerned about Ana's mistakes.

Derek talks about the show with Julia Houston (Debra Messing) (who's consulting) and Jimmy Collins (Jeremy Jordan). They all feel the show is missing something and aren't sure what. Jimmy, trying to keep the now deceased Kyle's spirit alive, doesn't want to change the writing. Derek publicly says that Ana, who's made several mistakes, needs a rest and decides to put in Daisy Parker (Mara Davi) (who is an old flame of Derek's and now in the ensemble) as the Diva for a night. Julia and Jimmy ponder that maybe the transfer to Broadway has lost a connection with the audience that existed in the off-Broadway show because of its smaller theaters.

Ana is unhappy she's being replaced for the night and is suspicious of Derek's motives. Karen tells her she'll talk to Derek about it. When Ana tells her that Daisy was one of the women who accused Derek of sexual harassment the previous year, Karen confronts him about it. He divulges to her that after Daisy dropped the charges he went out with her a few times and during an intimate encounter, he promised her an understudy role in Hit List. The problem is that she filmed it and is blackmailing him with it and he says he doesn't have a choice. Karen is disgusted with him.

Julia and Jimmy go to Jimmy and Kyle's apartment to check some of Kyle's notes for ideas. From an index card note, Julia remembers Kyle talking about wanting the audience to have a multimedia experience. They decide to put something in the show for that night's performance after the "I'm Not Sorry" number, basically tweeting the audience members and putting up a multimedia screen to engage them before the next number.

Karen and Daisy perform "I'm Not Sorry" for Hit List, a performance that has "Nina" and the Diva performing at the Video Music Awards and trying to one-up each other.

Eileen plans a Houston and Levitt tribute night for Tony voters to help get Bombshell some support for nominations. However, Julia is distracted with helping at Hit List and Tom is unhappy about it and word has got out that their partnership is splitting up. Tom, trying to get attention for his directing, turns the tribute into a cabaret revue that's more like an old time stripper show. He wants Ivy Lynn (Megan Hilty) to sing a song as a stripper. Ivy, having heard some gossip about several bad things she's done in her past, is afraid of anything that will put her in a bad light for Tony voters. However, she agrees to do it and performs "Grin and Bear It". Julia only makes it to the last part of the show but she and Tom sing "The Right Regrets". Afterwards, they hug and express regret about their fighting and Julia wonders if they really have to end their partnership. She's kind of scared since they've been partners for 11 years. He says maybe that's why the partnership needs to end.

Jimmy wants more help with Hit List, but Julia tells him she was only consulting and helping with the transfer to Broadway and has to be loyal to and work on Bombshell. He is angry but tells her he understands.

Karen and Ivy run into each other on the street and are friendly to each other. Ivy congratulates Karen on going to Broadway. Ivy then suggests that with the run up to the Tonys, they make every attempt not to stab each other in the back. Karen agrees.

Ana, Derek and Karen are in a bar, and Derek tells the ladies that producer Jerry Rand loves Daisy as the Diva and wants her to remain in the role. Derek is unhappy about it but feels there's nothing he can do. He stalks off and passes Ivy without talking to her. Ana, who is angry about losing her job, asks Ivy about losing her Bombshell role early on after sleeping with Derek. Ivy is angry that Karen told Ana about that and confronts Karen about it. Karen says she's not trying to backstab Ivy, she told Ana because they are friends, and she thought everyone knew already. Ivy retorts that the only thing better than winning a Tony would be beating her for it and Karen decides to leave. Ivy then gets a call from her doctor's office telling her that she's pregnant.

== Production ==
The episode featured four songs, all originals. "Pretender" was written by Lucie Silvas and Michael Busbee. "Grin and Bare It" and "The Right Regrets were written by the show's in-house songwriters Marc Shaiman and Scott Wittman. "I'm Not Sorry" was written by Andrew McMahon.

"Pretender", "Grin and Bare It", and "I'm Not Sorry" were made available as singles the week the episode aired. "The Right Regrets" is available on the cast album Bombshell.

== Critical reception ==
Michael Slezak at TVLine reviewed the episode.
