= The Song (Smash) =

- Smash episode
- Episode no.: Season 2 Episode 4
- Directed by: Michael Morris
- Written by: Bathsheba Doran
- Production code: 204
- Original air date: February 26, 2013

Guest appearances
- Jennifer Hudson as Veronica Moore; Sheryl Lee Ralph as Cynthia Moore; Daniel Sunjata as Peter Gillman; Michael Cristofer as Jerry Rand; Thorsten Kaye as Nick

Episode chronology
← Previous "The Dramaturg"	Next → "The Read-Through"
- Smash (season 2)

"The Song" is the nineteenth episode of the American television series Smash. It was written by Bathsheba Doran and directed by Michael Morris. The episode premiered on NBC on February 26, 2013, the fourth episode of Season 2. Derek and Tom help Veronica with her one-night-only concert, while Jimmy and Kyle, with Karen's encouragement, try to get a song submitted for the concert, and Julia and Peter struggle to work together to fix Bombshell's script.

== Plot ==
Broadway star Veronica Moore (guest star Jennifer Hudson) hires Derek (Jack Davenport) to direct her one night only concert show. During the concert rehearsal, Veronica sings "I Got Love". Derek proposes a more sexed-up version, which Veronica and her mother Cynthia (Sheryl Lee Ralph) oppose. Veronica tries Derek's version but is uncomfortable.

Meanwhile, Karen gets Tom Levitt (Christian Borle), the concert's musical director, to listen to Jimmy and Kyle pitch some songs for Veronica, to include partial versions of "Chest of Broken Hearts" and "I'm Not Lost". Tom doesn't think any of them are right for Veronica, so Kyle proposes he and Jimmy write a song. Jimmy and Kyle struggle with writing something that's right for Veronica; Karen gives him a suggestion that helps. They finish the song but Derek tells them never mind as he gives in to Veronica and her mother to let Veronica sing the songs she's comfortable with.

Meanwhile, Julia Houston (Debra Messing) and Peter (Daniel Sunjata) struggle to make improvements to Bombshell's script.

Jimmy storms off and gets high, while Kyle looks for him and sings "Everybody Loves You Now", which is then continued by Veronica, who is changing her mind on doing things Derek's way. Tom has looked at Jimmy and Kyle's song and convinces Derek to use it in the concert. Karen finds a drugged up Jimmy and convinces him to come back to the stage and show everyone that he can handle rejection. Cynthia informs Derek and the group that the Bravo network will be filming the concert so they will have a large audience. Veronica finally tells Derek that she wants to do it his way and does his sexed-up version of "I Got Love" during the concert. At the end of the concert, Veronica introduces Jimmy and Kyle's new song "I Can't Let Go", and gets a standing ovation from the audience when she finishes. She invites Jimmy and Kyle, who are standing backstage, to stand beside her and introduces them to the audience.

== Production ==
Jennifer Hudson guest stars as Veronica Moore, in her last episode of a three episode arc.

Sheryl Lee Ralph, the original Deena Jones in Dreamgirls, guest stars in this episode as Veronica's mother, Cynthia.

Five songs are featured in the episode, three originals (two partials) and two covers (Billy Joel's "Everybody Loves You Now" and "I Got Love" from the Purlie musical and also sung by Melba Moore). The show's in-house songwriters Marc Shaiman and Scott Wittman wrote the originals "I Can't Let Go", "I'm Not Lost", and "Chest of Broken Hearts". The latter two are heard only in part and it's unknown if there are full versions available.

"I Got Love" and "I Can't Let Go" were both released for sale as singles on iTunes and Amazon.com's MP store.

== Critical reception ==
Sara Brady from Televisionwithoutpity.com gave episode a C rating. The A.V. Club gave episode a C− rating.

== Reception ==
In its original broadcast, "The Song" was watched by 3.0 million American viewers, attaining a 0.9 rating/3 share in the key adults 18–49 demographic.
