= Bakery in Brooklyn =

- Directed by: Gustavo Ron
- Written by: Gustavo Ron; Francisco Zegers
- Produced by: Alison Anne Abrohams; Nicholas Owen Langholff; Michael Matzdorff
- Starring: Aimee Teegarden; Krysta Rodriguez
- Cinematography: Miguel P. Gilaberte
- Edited by: Vicente Perez
- Music by: Lucio Godoy
- Distributed by: Gravitas Ventures
- Release date: June 30, 2016 (Italy)
- Running time: 100 minutes
- Countries: United States; Spain
- Language: English

Bakery in Brooklyn is a 2016 American-Spanish romantic comedy film starring Aimee Teegarden and Krysta Rodriguez.

== Cast ==
- Aimee Teegarden as Vivien
- Krysta Rodriguez as Chloe
- Griffin Newman as Ian
- Ernie Sabella as Dave
- Blanca Suárez as Daniella
- Ward Horton as Paul
- Aitor Luna as Fernando
- Anthony Chisolm as Nathan
- Linda Lavin as Isabelle
- Josh Pais as Alexander Johnson (Lawyer)

== Plot ==
Two cousins, raised as sisters, set out to save the family bakery. The owner, their aunt, dies suddenly and unexpectedly. A banker is trying to foreclose on the bakery, but is prevented from doing so when it's declared a heritage site. The cousins succeed in saving the bakery.

(In a completely, seemingly unrelated side plot, an old couple tries to kill Daniella and Ian with poisoned tea.)

The movie ends with Vivien and Paul kissing by a tree in a square in Valencia.

== Reception ==
On the review aggregator website Rotten Tomatoes, 43% of seven critics' reviews are positive, with an average rating of 3.7/10. Brad Wheeler of The Globe and Mail awarded the film half a star out of four. John Hartl of The Seattle Times awarded the film one and a half stars out of four.
