= Becky Mode =

American playwright & actress

Becky Mode is an American playwright, actress and television producer based in New York City. Raised in Washington D.C., she studied theater and American history at Wesleyan University, graduating Phi Beta Kappa. Her major accomplishments include the play Fully Committed co-created with Mark Setlock which achieved a number four listing on Time magazine's "Top Ten Plays of 2000". In addition, she appeared in the 1995 film Party Girl.

Her writing credits also include several episodes of the NBC TV series Smash ("Musical Chairs" and "The Producers"). She contributed to the screenplay of the Netflix show Unbelievable and is credited with writing several episodes.
