= The Phenomenon (Smash) =

- Smash episode
- Episode no.: Season 2 Episode 14
- Directed by: Roxann Dawson
- Written by: Jordon Nardino & Joshua Safran
- Production code: 214
- Original air date: May 4, 2013

Guest appearances
- Jesse L. Martin as Scott Nichols; Bernadette Peters as Leigh Conroy; Daphne Rubin-Vega as Agnes; Michael Cristofer as Jerry Rand

Episode chronology
← Previous "The Producers"	Next → "The Transfer"
- Smash (season 2)

"The Phenomenon" is the twenty ninth episode of the American television series Smash. It was written by Jordon Nardino and executive producer and showrunner Joshua Safran and directed by Roxann Dawson. The episode premiered on NBC on May 4, 2013, the fourteenth episode of season 2.

== Plot ==
Karen Cartwright (Katharine McPhee) and Derek Wills (Jack Davenport) have made it to Karen's apartment and continue drinking wine for several more hours. After they drink the last of the wine, they start to make out. Derek asks her if she's sure she wants to do this and they continue.

Jimmy Collins (Jeremy Jordan) sings "High and Dry" while he walks around sad about his life and being fired from Hit List. He looks for Kyle, even going to their apartment but doesn't find him. He then goes to Karen's apartment building and goes up the fire escape and raps on Karen's window. She comes to the window and Jimmy tells her he wants to be with her. Derek calls out to her and a hurt Jimmy leaves.

Scott Nichols (Jesse L. Martin) and Julia Houston (Debra Messing) discuss that Tom Levitt (Christian Borle) is dissolving her and Tom's partnership. Scott is upset because he feels he'll lose The Great Gatsby that Julia wants to do and he'll end up losing his job. Julia says she'll talk to Tom.

Eileen Rand (Anjelica Huston) gets together with her publicist Agnes (Daphne Rubin-Vega) and Tom, Ivy Lynn (Megan Hilty and Ivy's mom Leigh Conroy (Bernadette Peters) to plan strategy for a Tony nominations campaign for Bombshell. We learn that Eileen will push for Ivy for lead and Leigh for supporting for Bombshell and that Ivy will also be pushed for her supporting role in Liaisons. Eileen learns that her ex-husband Jerry Rand (Michael Cristofer) has taken out a full page ad to tout Bombshell. She goes and sees him at a restaurant. He tells her he took out the ad to help her. She tells him to stay out of her life, throwing a martini at him for good measure.

Tom is informed by the police that Kyle Bishop (Andy Mientus) has been hit by a car. He goes and finds Derek and Karen at the Hit List theater and tells them that Kyle is dead. Derek and Karen tell a devastated cast. Scott Nichols (Jesse L. Martin) thinks the show should go on that night but Derek nixes the idea.

Ticket holders have been informed that the show that night has been canceled, but many line up anyway because they want to see the show and pay tribute. Derek tells the cast that he thinks they should put on the show as a concert as a way to honor Kyle and the show.

Tom flashes back to one morning with Kyle where he serenades him with "Vienna".

Leigh and a young actress playing a young Marilyn (Sophia Caruso) perform "At Your Feet" during a Bombshell show.

Tom and Julia talk about Tom wanting to dissolve their partnership. He says he's doing it so she will have The Great Gatsby free and clear to make without any interference from him since she initially optioned the rights as part of their partnership.

Jimmy shows up backstage and learns that Kyle is dead. He leaves upset and Karen goes to find him. She finds him sitting on a ledge at a place that he and Kyle liked. She tells him he should come to the show that night but he doesn't feel he's up to it. She also tells him that nothing happened between her and Derek because she's in love with him.

Julia is angry with Scott after finding out he told the stage manager that she (Julia) said it was ok to call the ticketholders back and let them know the show was still on for that night and it was being done in memory of Kyle. She feels he was being greedy and using Kyle's death for his own means, as he was afraid of getting fired if Hit List didn't do well. She tells him she won't be doing Gatsby with him.

During the concert, Jimmy shows up and steps in and sings an emotional "The Love I Meant to Say" in memory of Kyle.

Ivy meets up with Derek and he asks her why she has been ducking his calls. She tells him that she found out they got together again after he had been rejected by Karen. He tells her that nothing has happened between Karen and him, including last night where he slept on her couch. She tells him there will always be a "Karen" and she's done with him.

Eileen runs into Jerry, who tells her that he no longer has the money available to help with Bombshell, as he's decided to invest it in Hit List and will be taking it to Broadway. He chortles that now he and Eileen will likely be in contention for Tony nominations.

Karen asks Jimmy if he wants to go somewhere and talk, but he tells her he needs to be alone to sort things out. He also indicates that he's no longer drinking.

Julia had wanted as much of Broadway as possible to dim their lights in Kyle's honor but Eileen said that was unlikely as that honor is reserved for Broadway veterans, so after the Hit List concert, the cast, with Tom, Julia and Eileen, watch from across the street as the Bombshell theater lights are dimmed for Kyle.

== Production ==
The episode was co-written by executive producer and showrunner Joshua Safran.

In an interview with TVLine.com, Andy Mientus, who plays Kyle, talks about the episode's parallels to the hit musical Rent, with creator Jonathan Larson dying before that show's opening night and how it affected people and the theater world.

There were five songs featured in the episode, two covers ("High and Dry" by Radiohead and "Vienna" by Billy Joel) and three originals (one reprise). The reprised "Broadway, Here I Come!" was written by Joe Iconis, "At Your Feet" and "The Love I Meant To Say" were written by the show's in-house songwriters Marc Shaiman and Scott Wittman.

In an interview with Broadwayworld.com dated April 6, 2013, Jeremy Jordan talks about singing "The Love I Meant to Say" live on the show, as most numbers are pre-recorded and lip-synced.

"High and Dry", "Vienna", and "The Love I Meant to Say" were made available for sale as singles the week the episode aired. "Broadway, Here I Come!" had been released previously as a single. "At Your Feet" is available on the cast album Bombshell.

== Critical reception ==
Hillary Busis of Entertainment Weekly reviewed the episode. Sara Brady of Television Without Pity reviewed the episode and gave it a C rating.
