= The Dramaturg =

- Smash episode
- Episode no.: Season 2 Episode 3
- Directed by: Larry Shaw
- Written by: Bryan Goluboff
- Production code: 203
- Original air date: February 19, 2013

Guest appearances
- Jennifer Hudson as Veronica Moore; Julian Ovenden as Simon; Daniel Sunjata as Peter

Episode chronology
← Previous "The Fallout"	Next → "The Song"
- Smash (season 2)

"The Dramaturg" is the eighteenth episode of the American television series Smash. It was written by Bryan Goluboff and directed by Larry Shaw. The episode premiered on NBC on February 19, 2013, the third episode of Season 2. Eileen introduces Tom and Julia to a new writing partner in order to fix Bombshell's script; Karen confers with Derek about Jimmy and Kyle's musical that they are working on; Derek tries to get reinstated as the director for The Wiz revival with Veronica Moore.

== Plot ==
Eileen Rand (Anjelica Huston) sets up Bombshell songwriters Julia Houston (Debra Messing) and Tom Levitt (Christian Borle) with a new writing partner, Peter (Daniel Sunjata), who is known as a dramaturg or a "script doctor", in order to fix the script of Bombshell. Julia is very resistant to the idea and has a difficult time warming up to him and his ideas about how to fix the musical. He suggests that there was a lot about Joe DiMaggio in the script because she was in love with the actor who played him. He also suggests there isn't enough steam in the show, giving Julia the idea to write a scene about JFK.

The beginning of the episode shows Karen Cartwright (Katharine McPhee) singing a song called "Good for You" at a concert and body-surfing through the audience. It turns out that she's just imagining it as she has Derek Wills (Jack Davenport) listen to the song she recorded as a demo to help the two younger songwriters who wrote it, Jimmy Collins (Jeremy Jordan) and Kyle Bishop (Andy Mientus).

Ivy Lynn (Megan Hilty) auditions for a part in the ensemble of a new musical Liaisons. She talks the producer into letting her also audition for Cecile, the lead female. She starts doubting herself while preparing for the audition and goes to talk to Derek about it, interrupting a Bombshell work session with Karen and the ensemble for "They Just Keep Moving the Line". As she ponders things, she fantasizes herself singing "Dancing On My Own" while Karen and the ensemble work out an arrangement to the Bombshell song. She tells Derek he's having trouble with the choreography because he's doubting himself. She also confers with Tom about her anxiety and he manages to make her feel better. She later tells Tom that she got the part of Cecile.

Derek is trying to get back his job as director for the upcoming The Wiz revival with Veronica Moore (Jennifer Hudson). He invites Veronica and a Wiz producer to watch a new number for Bombshell that they're staging, about the first time that JFK and Marilyn met, which Julia wrote after her conversations with Peter. We see a fantasy version of an actor named Simon (Julian Ovenden) and Karen as JFK and Marilyn meeting for the first time at a party. He sings "Our Little Secret" to her as a seduction while she acts demur and then they sleep together. Later, Julia feels really good about the scene, but Peter tells her that the problem with it is that she wrote it as JFK is the seducer and the Marilyn is being seduced, and that it should be the other way around.

Jimmy and Kyle are trying to put their Hit List musical into a coherent order so that they can show it to Derek. A notebook with some important information is missing from their pile, so Jimmy goes back to where he left it, an apparently not-nice place where he used to live. He runs into the homeowner, a man who appears to have a rocky relationship with Jimmy. When we see Jimmy later, he appears to have been in a fight, but he did retrieve the notebook. They meet with Derek and Karen and pitch their story of Hit List. Kyle says Act Two needs some work, but Derek says it sounds good overall and he's willing to help them.

Derek runs into Veronica, who tells him she dropped out of The Wiz revival. She wants to do a one night only concert to show that she's more than a goody two shoes and wants to make an impact on the world. She asks him to help her with it and he agrees.

== Production ==
Jennifer Hudson guest stars as Veronica Moore, in her second of a three episode arc.

Five songs are featured in this episode, three originals (one a reprise) and two covers (Robyn's "Dancing On My Own" and "Soon As I Get Home" from The Wiz musical, which is sung by Veronica rehearsing for The Wiz musical). For the three originals, the show's in-house songwriters Marc Shaiman and Scott Wittman wrote "Our Little Secret" and the reprised "They Just Keep Moving the Line", while Drew Gasparini wrote "Good For You".

"Dancing On My Own" and "Good For You" were released as singles for sale from iTunes and Amazon.com's MP3 store, while "Our Little Secret" and "They Just Keep Moving the Line" are available on the cast album Bombshell.

== Critical reception ==
The A.V. Club gave the episode a C− rating.

== Reception ==
In its original broadcast, the episode was watched by 3.29 million American viewers and attaining a 0.9/2 share in the key adults 18-49 demographic.
