= The Producers (Smash) =

- Smash episode
- Episode no.: Season 2 Episode 13
- Directed by: Tricia Brock
- Written by: Becky Mode
- Production code: 213
- Original air date: April 27, 2013

Guest appearances
- Jesse L. Martin as Scott Nichols; David Call as Adam; Daphne Rubin-Vega as Agnes; Kathie Lee Gifford as herself; Carolee Carmello as Marie Bishop

Episode chronology
← Previous "Opening Night"	Next → "The Phenomenon"
- Smash season 2

"The Producers" is the twenty eighth episode of the American television series Smash. It was written by Becky Mode and directed by Tricia Brock. The episode premiered on NBC on April 27, 2013, the thirteenth episode of Season 2. An off-the-rail Jimmy threatens Hit Lists future, as Karen, Derek, Ana and Kyle join forces to try help him before things take a turn for the worse. Tom and Julia's partnership is at breaking point just as Ivy, Eileen, and the entire Bombshell team are running themselves ragged to outshine their competitors.

== Plot ==
Eileen Rand (Anjelica Huston) has the Bombshell cast working hard on promotion since ticket sales are not where they want them to be. Ivy Lynn (Megan Hilty) does a promotional bit with Today show host Kathie Lee Gifford (playing herself), where she and the Bombshell ensemble, with a little assist from Gifford, perform "The 20th Century Fox Mambo" for several musical theater children. Ivy blows off Derek Wills (Jack Davenport), citing her workload.

Tom Levitt (Christian Borle) finds out from Eileen that his writing partner Julia Houston (Debra Messing) is planning to do an adaptation of The Great Gatsby without him. He wants to do Gatsby with her (since he no longer has that directing job for "City of Angels") and break her promise to Scott Nichols (Jesse L. Martin) that he would produce it as a play with her. She agrees to talk to Scott. However, Scott reveals that he borrowed some money from next year's fund for Hit List and if Hit List doesn't do well and he doesn't have a good show to follow it, namely Gatsby, he's out as director of the Manhattan Theater Workshop. Julia later tells Tom she has to keep her promise to Scott. During a Q&A hosted by Ivy, things are tense, and Tom answers a question about their partnership by saying it's over. Afterwards, Julia asks him about it and begs to be allowed to pursue the Gatsby project because it's the first thing she's done in years that has made her happy. Tom retorts that she has provided the answer to their dilemma.

Jimmy Collins (Jeremy Jordan) has gone on a days-long bender after he was rejected by Karen Cartwright (Katharine McPhee) and Derek is getting fed up with his chronic lateness, especially since they are about to do a special preview show to entice producers to take the show to Broadway. Jimmy gets angry when he finds out that Derek is auditioning understudies and potential replacements, including Karen's Bombshell friend Sam Strickland (Leslie Odom, Jr), who sings "Rewrite This Story" during his audition. Derek decides that Sam will be Jimmy's understudy.

During the show, Jimmy performs high. Derek asks Ana Vargas (Krysta Rodriguez) as the Diva to sing "Broadway, Here I Come" in the first scene as she shoots a gun at an unknown target; this upsets Jimmy and Karen, as now Karen's character is no longer introducing the song. Jimmy keeps missing cues, including being late to the beginning of "Rewrite This Story" with Karen. Later, Karen and Jimmy sing "Don't Let Me Know". During the performance of "Broadway, Here I Come" by Karen, Karen is accidentally hurt because a high Jimmy fails to catch her during a staged fall after The Diva shoots and kills Amanda (Karen). In the last scene, the cast sings "The Goodbye Song" as the spirit of Amanda walks into the light.

The various producers attending the show all pass because they think it's too dark and doesn't have enough moneymaking potential. Derek later asks Eileen if she would consider taking it to Broadway, but she declines, saying she doesn't have the money.

After the show, Derek tells Karen and Kyle Bishop (Andy Mientus) that he's fed up and firing Jimmy for his behavior. Kyle asks to be the one to tell Jimmy.

Later at a cast party, Kyle tells Jimmy he's fired, and Jimmy, being high at the moment, becomes very angry. He gets on top of the bar and tells several people off, particularly Karen and Kyle, and reveals to Kyle's boyfriend that Kyle has been sleeping with Tom.

Bombshell's publicist Agnes (Daphne Rubin-Vega) tells Eileen, who had been considering asking Tom and Julia to reduce their royalties from Bombshell, that due to the extra publicity, ticket sales are up.

Karen sits with Derek at the bar as the party has wound down. He thinks maybe he should call it a night, but Karen orders more drinks. She's somewhat flirty with him and asks him to walk her home, and they go off together, both somewhat drunk.

Kyle sings "Last Goodbye" over a montage of various characters, including him packing up Jimmy's things and taking them over to Adam's (David Call) house, Jimmy's brother and where Jimmy is currently staying. As Kyle walks back home, he walks into the path of an oncoming car.

== Production ==
Today show host Kathie Lee Gifford made a cameo as herself.

There were six songs featured in the episode, five originals (3 of them reprises) and one cover ("Last Goodbye" by Jeff Buckley). Of the reprised songs, "The 20th Century Fox Mambo" was written by the show's in-house writing team Marc Shaiman and Scott Wittman, "Rewrite This Story" was written by Pasek and Paul, and "Broadway, Here I Come!" was written by Joe Iconis. Of the original songs, "The Goodbye Song" was written by Iconis, and "Don't Let Me Know" was written by Lucie Silvas and Jamie Alexander Hartman.

"Don't Let Me Know", "The Goodbye Song" and "Last Goodbye" were made available for sale as singles the week the episode aired. "The 20th Century Fox Mambo", with McPhee's vocals, was previously released on the cast albums The Music of Smash and Bombshell, and "Rewrite This Story" with McPhee and Jordan's vocals and "Broadway, Here I Come!" with Jordan's vocals were previously released as singles.

== Critical reception ==
Sara Brady of Television Without Pity reviewed the episode and gave it a C+ rating.
