= Musical Chairs (Smash) =

- Smash episode
- Episode no.: Season 2 Episode 7
- Directed by: Casey Nicholaw
- Written by: Becky Mode
- Production code: 207
- Original air date: March 19, 2013

Guest appearances
- Sean Hayes as Terry Falls; Jesse L. Martin as Scott Nichols; Michael Cristofer as Jerry Rand; Grace Gummer as Katie Rand

Episode chronology
← Previous "The Fringe"	Next → "The Bells and Whistles"
- Smash (season 2)

"Musical Chairs" is the twenty second episode of the American television series Smash. It was written by Becky Mode and directed by Casey Nicholaw. The episode premiered on NBC on March 19, 2013, the seventh episode of Season 2. Karen, Tom, Julia and Derek adapt to a new environment. Pressure mounts at Liaisons. Katie's assistance leads Eileen to discover how to salvage Bombshell.

== Plot ==
Jimmy Collins (Jeremy Jordan), Kyle Bishop (Andy Mientus), Ana Vargas (Krysta Rodriguez), and Derek Wills (Jack Davenport) present parts of Hit List to Scott Nichols (Jesse L. Martin), director of the Manhattan Theater Workshop that is sponsoring the musical. Scott says he needs to talk to his people. Scott later suggests that they add a narrator to the show to help explain things since it is now sung-through and lacking dialogue. Scott feels that if their older audience doesn't understand it, it can't be presented on their bigger main stage and will have to be relegated to a tiny under 80 seat room for more experimental work. Jimmy is very resistant to any changes, while Kyle and Derek think it's a good idea, and Derek and Jimmy clash about it.

Bombshell rehearsals aren't going so well, with Tom Levitt (Christian Borle) learning to direct, butting heads with Karen Cartwright (Katharine McPhee), and trying to avoid using Derek's choreography until he signs a release to allow them to use it in the show. Producer Eileen Rand (Anjelica Huston) schemes to get control of Bombshell back from her ex-husband Jerry (Michael Cristofer). Her daughter Katie (Grace Gummer) has arrived to help her mother. Julia Houston (Debra Messing) is supportive of Tom's direction but she isn't happy that Tom has dropped the part of the storyline that was about Marilyn's mother.

At Liaisons, the show remains terrible and the cast is unhappy with how it has turned out when it starts doing shows in front of preview audiences. Both Ivy Lynn (Megan Hilty) and Terry Falls (Sean Hayes) lament how things are going and they fear the show will not make it to opening night. Ivy suggests that if the show is going to be closed anyway, why not go all out crazy; Terry likes that idea.

As a peace offering, Tom asks Karen to go see Liaisons on opening night with him. It turns out that Derek has invited Kyle and Jimmy to go to the show with him. They all meet up before the show starts and Derek argues with Jerry and Tom about him leaving Bombshell, while Kyle and Jimmy assume Derek will go back to that show. During the show, the audience isn't responding well, but then the "Ce N'Est Pas Ma Faute (It's Not My Fault)" number starts and instead of being a bore as previously done with preview audiences, Terry and the ensemble have turned it into a very bawdy, outrageous number that has the audience laughing. At the end though, Terry falls out of a swing and onto the floor.

Tom and Karen meet up with Ivy after the show and Karen sees the chemistry between them. She tells Tom that since the Liaisons show will probably close, Ivy will be free (to take over Bombshell) and that it's for the best that she (Karen) leaves Bombshell. Tom sadly agrees that this idea is for the best and he will work out the contract issue (for letting Karen out of the show) with Eileen. Karen meets up with Derek, Kyle and Jimmy and tells them she has left Bombshell and asks if they would let her back into Hit List. They happily agree.

A chastened Terry tells the cast that he'll be ok, but confirms that his understudy will take over for the rest of the week and the show will then close. Ivy leaves the theater with a big smile (presumably knowing she can now return to Bombshell, but that's left unclear).

After talking to Karen about the problems with Hit List, Jimmy gives in on making changes and he and Kyle have added a new opening number. Jimmy and Karen perform "Rewrite This Story" in front of Scott and his team, while Derek imagines video screens and massive lighting has been added to the stage. Scott likes the new number and offers the main stage to the show.

Eileen, Katie, Tom, and Julia confront Jerry about returning the show to Eileen, but he refuses to relinquish control. Katie pulls out the "I'm disappointed in you Dad" card and Jerry gives in. Later, Derek approaches Tom and Julia in their rehearsal hall and gives them the signed agreement to let them use his choreography. Eileen comes in and confirms to them that a bunch of lawyers and someone from the ADA's office have worked it out so that she has control of the show again. They toast to Bombshell going to Broadway.

== Production ==
There were four songs featured in the episode, all originals (2 of them reprises). The show's in-house songwriters Marc Shaiman and Scott Wittman wrote the reprised "The National Pastime" and "Ce N'Est Pas Ma Faute (It's Not My Fault)", while Julian Emery, Jon Green, James Lawrence Irvin and Lucie Silvas wrote the reprised "Heart Shaped Wreckage" and Pasek and Paul wrote "Rewrite This Story".

"Ce N'Est Pas Ma Faute (It's Not My Fault) and "Rewrite This Story" were released as singles for sale from iTunes and Amazon.com's MP3 store. "Heart Shaped Wreckage" was previously released as a single and "The National Pastime" is available on the cast album Bombshell.

== Critical reception ==
Sara Brady from Television Without Pity gave the episode a B rating.
