= Michael Riedel (journalist) =

American theater critic

Michael Riedel (born December 24, 1966) is an American theatre critic, conservative broadcaster, and columnist. He was the co-host of "Len Berman and Michael Riedel in the Morning" on 710 WOR in New York City, weekdays 6 to 10 a.m. The last show was November 8, 2024. The show was dropped as part of a series of layoffs by iHeartMedia. Reidel has been a Broadway columnist of the New York Post for more than 20 years. Riedel's book Razzle Dazzle: The Battle for Broadway won the 2015 Marfield Prize for arts writing. His second book, Singular Sensation: The Triumph of Broadway, was published by Avid Reader Press, a division of Simon & Schuster, on November 10, 2020.

Riedel's skewering of Broadway shows and personalities in his column have made him a controversial figure on the New York theater scene. He has been called "the terrible infant of the New York press".

== Early life and education ==
Riedel was born on December 24, 1966, and grew up in Geneseo, New York. His father was the athletic director for SUNY Geneseo and his mother was a grade-school librarian. He has been described as a "smart, sarcastic kid" who joined the Young Republicans at 12 and planned to become a lawyer and politician.

He enrolled at Johns Hopkins University, but transferred after a year to Columbia University. While at Columbia, he acted in plays and regularly appeared on a radio show devoted to musical theater. The summer after his sophomore year, he interned for Liz McCann while she was producing the Broadway production of Les liaisons dangereuses. In 1989, he graduated magna cum laude and Phi Beta Kappa with a BA in History.

== Career ==
After graduating from Columbia, Riedel served as managing editor of the now-defunct TheaterWeek magazine, which he attempted to make more literary by hiring highly theater figures such as critic Eric Bentley to write articles. He stayed friends with Bentley until his death in 2020.

In 1993, he was hired as a gossip columnist for The Daily News reporting news and speculation about Broadway theater. In 1998, he moved his column to the New York Post, where he remains today. In September 2015, the Post announced that it was cutting the column from two columns a week to one. Riedel said of the change: "I'm happy about the changes. It's all part of a redesign of the features pages. If there's any 'breaking news,' I'll get it on the website and in the paper the next day." Riedel's Wednesday column was reinstated in the paper in 2016 after advertisers complained of its absence. Michael Riedel and Len Berman were laid off by iHeart Radio. Their final broadcast together was on November 8, 2024.

== David Leveaux controversy ==
In 2005, Riedel was the subject of press himself when he was in an altercation with English director David Leveaux at the Manhattan theater hangout Angus McIndoe. Riedel, who later admitted to being "tipsy," insulted Leveaux by claiming that English directors often ruin classic American musicals. Leveaux shoved Riedel to the floor. He was not injured.

== Cultural references ==
Riedel also appeared regularly on the "Imus in the Morning" program, "The Mark Simone Show", "The Mike Gallagher Show" and Fox News', "Red Eye".

Riedel played a version of himself in several episodes of the NBC musical drama Smash. In view of his reputation as a theater columnist, Riedel was referred to as a "Napoleonic little Nazi" in the premiere episode on February 6, 2012. He made cameo appearances in three episodes:

- "Hell on Earth"
- "The Fallout"
- "The Nominations"

In 2016, Riedel appeared on John Mulaney and Nick Kroll's comedy show Oh, Hello on Broadway.

Riedel was mentioned in the opening song at the 71st Tony Awards performed by host Kevin Spacey.

== See also ==
- New Yorkers in journalism
