= The Fallout (Smash) =

- Smash episode
- Episode no.: Season 2 Episode 2
- Directed by: Craig Zisk
- Written by: Julie Rottenberg; Elisa Zuritsky
- Production code: 202
- Original air date: February 5, 2013

Guest appearance
- Michael Cristofer as Jerry Rand

Episode chronology
← Previous "On Broadway"	Next → "The Dramaturg"
- Smash (season 2)

"The Fallout" is the seventeenth episode of the American television series Smash. It was written by Julie Rottenberg and Elisa Zuritsky and directed by Craig Zisk. The episode premiered on NBC on February 5, 2013, the second half of the season two two-hour premiere.

== Plot ==
In "The Fallout" the creative team behind the fictional musical Bombshell attempt to repair their reputations and mount the show following legal allegations about the source of financing for the show by Eileen Rand (Anjelica Huston) and sexual harassment charges leveled at director Derek Wills (Jack Davenport) by several women. Bombshell star Karen Cartwright (Katharine McPhee) encounters resistance when she tries to aid new composing team Jimmy Collins (Jeremy Jordan) and Kyle Bishop (Andy Mientus) working on their first musical.

A drunk Derek imagines that Ivy Lynn (Megan Hilty), Karen and several other women are giving him the business with "Would I Lie To You?". Ivy sings "They Just Keep Moving the Line" from Bombshell during an industry party that the Bombshell crew has crashed to entice new investors. Karen sings "Caught in the Storm" to Jimmy Collins (who has written the song) during a party to impress him. He ends up mad because Kyle gave Karen the song to look at and Jimmy is possessive of his work.

== Production ==
Three songs are featured in the episode, one cover (the Eurythmics "Would I Lie To You?) and two originals. For the two originals, the show's in-house songwriters Marc Shaiman and Scott Wittman wrote "They Just Keep Moving the Line", while Pasek and Paul wrote "Caught in the Storm".

"Caught in the Storm" was released as a single for sale from iTunes and Amazon.com's MP store, while "They Just Keep Moving the Line" is available on the cast album Bombshell.

== Critical reception ==
Sara Brady at Television Without Pity gave the episode a B rating.
