= Daniel Sunjata =

American actor (born 1971)

- Born: Daniel Sunjata Condon; December 30, 1971 (age 54); Evanston, Illinois, U.S.
- Education: University of Louisiana, Lafayette (BA); New York University (MFA)
- Occupation: Actor
- Years active: 1998–present

Daniel Sunjata Condon (born December 30, 1971) is an American actor. He is known for his role as Franco Rivera in the FX television series Rescue Me. Sunjata has received acclaim for his more recent role as Adam Karadec in the ABC television series High Potential.

== Early life and education ==
Sunjata was born and raised in Evanston, Illinois, a suburb north of Chicago. He is the adopted son of Bill and Catherine Condon, a police dispatcher and a civil rights worker. His adoptive parents are of Irish and Italian-German descent. He is named in honor of the Mandinka king Sundiata Keita, founder of the Mali Empire; the name means "hungry lion." He was told his biological mother was a white teenager who had run away from home and his father was African-American. He graduated from Mount Carmel High School in Chicago, where he played linebacker for two state championship football teams. After attending Florida A&M University, he earned a Bachelor of Arts degree from the University of Louisiana at Lafayette and a Master of Fine Arts from the Graduate Acting Program at New York University Tisch School of the Arts.

== Career ==
Sunjata played the role of a sailor on shore leave on the first post-9/11 themed episode of Sex and the City. He portrayed poet Langston Hughes in the film Brother to Brother (2004) and James Holt, a fashion designer, in The Devil Wears Prada (2006).

He starred as firefighter Franco Rivera on the television program Rescue Me. During the summer of 2007, he also starred in the ESPN miniseries The Bronx is Burning as Reggie Jackson. He appeared as a Special Forces Operative in Christopher Nolan's The Dark Knight Rises (2012).

In 2003, he won a Theatre World Award for his breakout Broadway performance as a gay Major League Baseball player who comes out to the public in Take Me Out, the Tony award-winning play, which also earned him nominations for a Tony Award and Drama Desk Award.

From 2010–2011, Sunjata played "Nurse Eli" on the TV series Grey's Anatomy and had a relationship with Dr. Miranda Bailey.

Beginning in 2013, he played FBI agent Paul Briggs on Graceland, which aired on USA Network. The show was canceled in 2015 after 3 seasons. He also starred as Dante "Mecca" Spears, the past lover of Monet, in Power Book II: Ghost on Starz for season 2.

Since 2024, Sunjata has starred as Detective Adam Karadec in the ABC/Hulu series High Potential.

== Filmography ==
=== Film ===
| Year | Title | Role | Notes |
|---|---|---|---|
| 1998 | Twelfth Night, or What You Will | Valentine | TV movie |
| 2001 | The Feast of All Saints | Christophe Mercier | TV movie |
| 2002 | Bad Company | CIA Agent Carew | |
| 2004 | Brother to Brother | Langston Hughes | |
| 2004 | Noel | Marco | |
| 2004 | Melinda and Melinda | Billy Wheeler | |
| 2006 | The Devil Wears Prada | James Holt | |
| 2009 | Ghosts of Girlfriends Past | Brad | |
| 2009 | Loose Change 9/11: An American Coup | The Narrator | |
| 2010 | At Risk | Detective Win Garano | TV movie |
| 2010 | The Front | Detective Win Garano | TV movie |
| 2010 | Weakness | Alejandro | |
| 2012 | One for the Money | Ranger | |
| 2012 | Gone | Powers | |
| 2012 | Generation Um... | Charles | |
| 2012 | The Dark Knight Rises | Captain Jones | |
| 2014 | Lullaby | Officer Ramirez | |
| 2017 | Small Town Crime | Detective Whitman | |
| 2021 | Christmas...Again?! | Mike Clybourne | TV movie |

=== Television ===
| Year | Title | Role | Notes |
|---|---|---|---|
| 2000 | D.C. | Lewis Freeman | Main Cast |
| 2000 | Law & Order: Special Victims Unit | Bomb Squad Officer | Episode: "Remorse" |
| 2001 | All My Children | Zachary Pell | Regular Cast |
| 2002 | Sex and the City | Louis Leroy, USN | Episode: "Anchors Away" |
| 2002–04 | Law & Order: Special Victims Unit | CSU Technician Burt Trevor | Recurring Cast: Seasons 3-5 |
| 2003 | Ed | Danny Martin | Episode: "The Case" |
| 2004–11 | Rescue Me | Franco Rivera | Main Cast |
| 2005 | Law & Order | Kenny Tremont | Episode: "Mammon" |
| 2006 | Love Monkey | Diego | Recurring Cast |
| 2007 | The Bronx is Burning | Reggie Jackson | Main Cast |
| 2008 | Great Performances | Christian de Neuvillette | Episode: "Cyrano de Bergerac" |
| 2009 | Lie to Me | Andrew Jenkins | Episode: "Blinded" |
| 2010 | 30 Rock | Chris | Episode: "College" |
| 2010–11 | Grey's Anatomy | Nurse Eli | Recurring Cast: Seasons 7-8 |
| 2012–13 | Smash | Peter Gillman | Recurring Cast: Season 2 |
| 2013–15 | Graceland | FBI Senior Agent Paul Briggs | Main Cast |
| 2016 | Notorious | Jake Gregorian | Main Cast |
| 2017 | Animal Kingdom | Smurf's Criminal Lawyer | Episode: "Betrayal" |
| 2018–20 | Manifest | Danny | Recurring Cast: Season 1, Guest: Season 2 |
| 2019 | Happy! | Simon | Recurring Cast: Season 2 |
| 2020 | Prodigal Son | Quinton Vosler | Episode: "Internal Affairs" |
| 2020 | #FreeRayshawn | SWAT Commander Nick Alvarez | Main Cast |
| 2020 | The Twilight Zone | Detective Peter Reece | Episode: "The Who of You" |
| 2020 | The Stand | Cobb | Episode: "The End" |
| 2021–24 | Power Book II: Ghost | Dante "Mecca" Spears | Main Cast: Season 2, Guest: Season 4 |
| 2022 | Echoes | Charles "Charlie" Davenport | Main Cast |
| 2023 | The Company You Keep | Robert Renway | Episode: "All In" |
| 2024–present | High Potential | Det. Adam Karadec | Main Cast |

=== Video games ===
| Year | Title | Role | Notes |
|---|---|---|---|
| 2002 | TOCA Race Driver | Nick Landers/James Randall | Voice |

=== Theater ===
| Year | Title | Role | Notes |
|---|---|---|---|
| 1998 | Twelfth Night | Valentine | |
| 2003 | Take Me Out | Darren Lemming | Theatre World Award; Nominated – Tony Award for Best Performance by a Featured Actor in a Play; Nominated – Drama Desk Award for Outstanding Actor in a Play |
| 2007 | Cyrano de Bergerac | Christian De Neuvillette | |
| 2013 | Macbeth | Macduff | |
| 2014 | The Country House | Michael Astor | |
| 2018 | Saint Joan | Dunois, Bastard of Orleans | |

== Awards and nominations ==
| Year | Awards | Category | Recipient | Outcome |
|---|---|---|---|---|
| 2005 | Satellite Award | Satellite Award for Best Cast – Television Series | "Rescue Me" | Won |
| 2008 | NAACP Image Awards | NAACP Image Award for Outstanding Actor in a Television Movie, Mini-Series or Dramatic Special | "The Bronx Is Burning" | Nominated |
| 2025 | 5th Astra TV Awards#Supporting | NAACP Image Award for Outstanding Actor in a Television Movie, Mini-Series or Dramatic Special | "High Potential" | Nominated |
