= Mara Davi =

American actress and dancer (born 1984)

- Born: January 22, 1984 (age 42); Alameda County, California, U.S.
- Education: California State University, Fullerton
- Occupations: Actress; dancer; singer
- Spouse: Aaron Gaines (married 2008–present)
- Children: 1

Mara Davi (born January 22, 1984, Alameda County, California) is an American actress, singer, and dancer; she made her Broadway debut as Maggie Winslow in the 2006 revival of A Chorus Line.

== Biography ==
Mara Davi grew up in Highlands Ranch, Colorado. She began dance lessons at three years old at a local studio but later transferred to the Academy of Theatre Arts in Englewood, Colorado. She studied several styles of dance, including ballet, tap, and jazz, but enjoyed tap the most. Her family moved to Folsom, California, where she attended Folsom High School. During high school, Davi shifted her focus away from dance to musical theater. She appeared in numerous regional productions including: Annie, The Sound of Music, Gypsy, Baby, Grease, and Joseph and the Amazing Technicolor Dreamcoat.

Davi attended California State University, Fullerton where, during her sophomore year, she was chosen for the lead in the U.S. and Japan tour of 42nd Street.

== Career ==
Davi played the role of Maggie in the Broadway revival of A Chorus Line, in 2006. She joined The Drowsy Chaperone on Broadway on July 30, 2007, succeeding Sutton Foster in the lead role of Janet van de Graaff. In March 2008, she was featured in the premiere of the musical stage version of The Band Wagon at the Old Globe Theatre in San Diego, in the role played by Cyd Charisse.

Davi returned to New York for the May 2008 Encores! concert presentation of No, No, Nanette in the title role, playing alongside Rosie O'Donnell, Sandy Duncan, Shonn Wiley, and Fred Willard. In 2012 she was in a musical adaptation of The Toxic Avenger at The Alley Theatre in Houston, Texas. The Toxic Avenger musical had plans on transferring on Broadway in the near future.

Davi made her Birdland cabaret debut in May 2008. She appeared on the Broadway stage as Judy Haynes in the 2009 New York production of Irving Berlin's White Christmas. She played Daisy Parker who blackmails Derek Wills for a role in the fictional Hit List on the second season of Smash. From 2011 to 2012 she played the role of Bianca Sanfino in "A Night on the Town", "Moonlighting", and "Women with Guns" the 5th, 9th, and 16th episodes of the second season of the CBS police procedural drama Blue Bloods.

From 2011, Davi and pianist/composer Adam Waite have appeared as the band "Mara and the Bitter Suite" and released an album in 2012 titled Unspoken.

Davi starred as Joan in the Broadway revival of "Dames at Sea", which ran from September 2015 to January 2016.

== Personal life ==
Davi married actor Aaron Gaines on June 8, 2008. They currently reside in New York.
