= Krysta Rodriguez =

American actress and singer

- Rodriguez in 2026
- Born: Krysta Anne Rodriguez; Orange, California, U.S.
- Education: New York University
- Occupations: Actress, Singer
- Years active: 1995–2000, 2004–present
- Known for: Smash; Spring Awakening; The Addams Family

Krysta Anne Rodriguez is an American actress and singer. She is best known for her roles as Ana Vargas in the NBC series Smash, Summer Henderson in the NBC series Trial & Error, Maxine Griffin in the ABC series Quantico and Ms. Crumble in the Netflix comedy series Daybreak. She's also starred on Broadway in the musicals Spring Awakening, The Addams Family, and Into the Woods.

== Early life and career ==
Rodriguez grew up in Orange County, California. She began taking dance lessons at the age of 13, after being involved with cheerleading in middle school. After traveling to New York and seeing eight Broadway shows, she realized performers had to sing and act as well as dance, so once she returned home Rodriguez began taking singing and acting lessons. She was a cast member of the Christian television show Colby's Clubhouse from 1995 to 2000. She attended Orange County High School of the Arts where she played many lead roles including Marian in The Music Man, as well as the lead role in Gidget: The Musical, a musical co-written and directed by Francis Ford Coppola, that starred Orange County High School of the Arts students during its (ultimately unsuccessful) tryouts in 2000. She attended New York University for a few years, but began working soon after enrolling. Rodriguez said of her education, "[A]lthough I would have loved to finish I did not get that opportunity because I started working. So…no degree in musical theater, but so far an okay career."

== Career ==
Rodriguez made her Broadway debut in the short-lived 2005 jukebox musical Good Vibrations. She later became a replacement for the role of Bebe in the Broadway revival of A Chorus Line in 2007. She has played numerous ensemble and understudy parts in the Broadway productions of Spring Awakening and In the Heights, as well as a regional production of The Boy Friend directed by Julie Andrews. She made her feature film debut in the role of Krysta in the 2010 film The Virginity Hit.

Beginning performances in fall 2009, Rodriguez originated the role of Wednesday Addams in the world premiere Chicago try-out run of the new Broadway-bound musical The Addams Family, based on the cartoons of Charles Addams. From March 2010, the show received its planned debut at New York's Lunt-Fontanne Theatre. After playing the role for over a year and lending her voice to the show's original cast recording, Rodriguez left the musical on March 8, 2011, and was replaced by Rachel Potter.

Other credits include an Encores! production of Bye Bye Birdie. Her first television role was a guest appearance as the character Jordan Steele in Gossip Girl. In 2011, Rodriguez starred in the television movie Iceland as Rose, one of a group of friends who reunite to heal and nurture each other after the death of one of their own.

In 2012, Rodriguez starred in another television movie Shadow of Fear as Lauren. The movie is about the push and pull between a schizophrenic new waiter and a popular young waitress. In 2013, she guest starred in the web series created by Mitchell Jarvis and Wesley Taylor, It Could Be Worse. She played an assistant to a Broadway Star named Bridgett/Bridget in two episodes, titled "Payment Plan" and "Let Your Hair Down".

Rodriguez joined the cast of the NBC series Smash for its second, and final, season in 2013, playing the role of Ana Vargas, an aspiring Broadway performer and the new roommate of Katharine McPhee's character Karen.

In July 2013, Rodriguez returned to Broadway playing Casey in First Date, co-starring with Zachary Levi.

In December 2013, Rodriguez appeared in Hit List, a concert presentation of the fictional musical created for the second season of Smash, as The Diva/Sarah Smith. Rodriguez was scheduled to have a major role in the planned CBS sitcom How I Met Your Dad; a spinoff and successor to the long-running sitcom How I Met Your Mother, but on March 25, 2014, it was announced that Rodriguez had exited the pilot. (The proposed spin-off would ultimately not be picked up.)

Rodriguez guest starred on Married in 2014, as Kim, a friend of a couple desperately trying to save their marriage. On Ian, Rodriguez guest starred as Fly Girl. Additionally, Rodriguez starred in the Lifetime holiday movie entitled Wishin' and Hopin' in the role of Annette Funicello, a teen idol, movie actress and Mickey Mouse Club Mousekteer.

In 2015, Rodriguez was cast as Vanessa, a straight talking, no-nonsense cancer patient ready to share her truth, in a multi-episode arc in the second season of the ABC Family television show Chasing Life. The season aired in the summer of 2015.

Also in 2015, she played Madison in an episode of Inside Amy Schumer. Krysta also guest starred in an episode of The Mysteries of Laura as April Watkins.

Rodriguez starred in the 2016 film Bakery in Brooklyn as Chloe, one of the lead characters.

Through June 14, 2015, she returned to star as Ilse in the Deaf West Theatre production of Spring Awakening, held at the Wallis Annenberg Center for the Performing Arts in Beverly Hills, California. The Los Angeles Times featured her in an article about her return to the production that she helped to create on Broadway. In July 2015, it was announced that the production would be transferring to Broadway with its current cast for a limited engagement at the Brooks Atkinson Theatre. Rodriguez performed in the Broadway revival from September 8, 2015, through its closing on January 24, 2016. The show ran two weeks past its intended run due to its rave reviews, and garnered three Tony Award nominations including Best Revival of a Musical.

Rodriguez performed in the Off-Broadway production of What We're Up Against, a play about how women are treated in the workplace. It shows the inequality of women and how nothing has changed in the past twenty-five years. She played "Eliza, a sharp young architect who [was] new to the firm". The show ran from October 28 through December 3, 2017. This was the first time Rodriguez and Skylar Astin worked together since Spring Awakening in 2006.

In 2017, Rodriguez starred as Summer Henderson in the NBC comedy series Trial & Error. In the same year, it was announced that Rodriguez was cast in the recurring role of Maxine Griffin in the second season of ABC's thriller series Quantico.

In 2018, it was announced that Rodriguez was cast in the main role of Ms. Crumble in the Netflix comedy-drama series Daybreak.

Rodriguez made her solo debut at Feinstein's/54 Below from September 10–14, 2019, directed by Ben Rauhala. Special guests included Kathryn Gallagher, Andy Mientus, Joe Iconis, Megan McGinnis, Jelani Alladin, and Adam Josef Levy.

In 2021, Rodriguez appeared in the role of Liza Minnelli in the Netflix miniseries Halston. In 2022, she co-starred with Santino Fontana in the Hallmark Channel film Just One Kiss.

In September 2022, Rodriguez starred as Cinderella in the 2022 Broadway revival of Into the Woods. She left the production in November of that year. From 13 July to 30 July 2023, she reprised her role of Cinderella at the Ahmanson Theatre on the US National Tour of Into the Woods.

== Personal life ==
In the fall of 2014, Rodriguez was diagnosed with breast cancer. In 2015, Rodriguez started the website ChemoCouture.com to create a blog detailing her journey during chemotherapy as well as providing various fashion, beauty, and wellness tips that she employs during her battle with cancer. After going public with her diagnosis, Rodriguez was contacted by Cosmopolitan to blog for their Cosmo Online Health and Fitness readers about her experiences.

== Credits ==
=== Theatre ===
Year(s)	Production	Role	Theatre/Location	Notes	Ref
2004	Bye, Bye Birdie	Ensemble	New York City Center	Encores!	
2005	Good Vibrations	Swing	Eugene O'Neill Theatre	Broadway	
2005	The Boy Friend	Fay	National tour	National tour	
2006-07	Spring Awakening	Ensemble u/s Anna u/s Martha u/s Thea u/s Ilse u/s Wendla	Eugene O'Neill Theatre	Broadway	
2007–08	A Chorus Line	Bebe (replacement)	Gerald Schoenfeld Theater	Broadway	
2008	In the Heights	Ensemble u/s Carla u/s Nina u/s Vanessa	Richard Rodgers Theatre	Broadway	
2009	The Addams Family	Wednesday Addams	Nederlander Theatre (Chicago)	Out-of-town tryout	
2010–11	The Addams Family	Wednesday Addams	Lunt-Fontanne Theatre	Broadway	
2013-14	First Date	Casey	Longacre Theatre	Broadway	
2013	Hit List (from Smash)	The Diva/Sarah Smith	Feinstein's/54 Below	Concert	
2015-16	Spring Awakening	Ilse	Deaf West Theatre Los Angeles	Regional	
2015-16	Spring Awakening	Ilse	Brooks Atkinson Theatre	Broadway	
2016	A Chorus Line	Diana Morales	Hollywood Bowl		
2017	What We're Up Against	Eliza	WP Theater	Off-Broadway	
2018	West Side Story	Anita	John F. Kennedy Center for the Performing Arts	Regional	
2018	Tarrytown	Katrina	MCC Theater	Reading	
2019	Hercules	Megara	Delacorte Theater		
2019	Seared	Emily	MCC Theater		
2022	Into the Woods	Cinderella (replacement)	St. James Theatre	Broadway	
2022–23	The Collaboration	Maya	Samuel J. Friedman Theatre	Broadway	
2023	Cabaret	Sally Bowles	Barrington Stage Company	Regional	
2023	Into the Woods	Cinderella (replacement)		U.S. national tour	
2024	13	Lucy	Lawrence Woodmere Academy	Concert	
2024	Bye Bye Birdie	Rosie Alvarez	John F. Kennedy Center for the Performing Arts	Regional	
2025	Smash	Tracy Morales	Imperial Theatre	Broadway	
2026	Starstruck	Roxanne Cooley	Bucks County Playhouse	Regional	
2026	Chicago	Roxie Hart (replacement)	Ambassador Theatre	Broadway	
2026	A Few Good Men	Lt. Commander Joanne Galloway	Vivienne Beaumont Theatre	Broadway	

=== Television ===
Year	Title	Role	Notes
1995–2000	Colby's Clubhouse	Krysta (herself)	
2008	Gossip Girl	Jordan Steele	
2010	Late Show with David Letterman	Herself	(Promotion for The Addams Family)
2013	Smash	Ana Vargas	
2014	How I Met Your Dad	Unknown	(Pilot wasn't picked up)
2014	Ian	Fly Girl	
2014	Married	Kim	
2015	Chasing Life	Vanessa	
2015	Inside Amy Schumer	Madison	
2015	The Mysteries of Laura	April Watkins	
2015	Late Night with Seth Meyers	Herself	(Promotion for Spring Awakening)
2016	Younger	Kim	
2017	Trial & Error	Summer Henderson/Claudia Ramirez	
2017	Quantico	Maxine Griffin	
2019	Daybreak	Ms. Crumble/The Witch	
2019	Soundtrack	Allie	
2021	Halston	Liza Minnelli	
2022	Would I Lie to You? (US)	Herself	Episode: "Child Toy Model"
2026	Line of Fire	Agent Ellen	Guest role

=== Film ===
Year	Title	Role	Notes
2010	The Virginity Hit	Krysta	
2011	Iceland	Rose	
2012	Shadow of Fear	Laura	
2014	Wishin' and Hopin'	Annette Funicello	
2016	Bakery in Brooklyn	Chloe	
2020	Killing Diaz	Diaz	
2021	The Bitch Who Stole Christmas	Olivia St. LaPelle	Lead role
2021	In the Heights	Background vocals	
2022	Just One Kiss	Mia Rivera	
2025	Out of Order	Sue	
TBA	Double Exposure	Dani	

=== Internet ===
Year	Title	Role	Notes
2013	It Could Be Worse	Bridgett/Bridget	
2013	Jared's Broadway Boos: Episode 64	Herself	
2018	Indoor Boys	Lacy	

== Awards and nominations ==
Year	Award	Category	Work	Result
2010	Broadway.com Audience Awards	Favorite Breakthrough Performance (Female)	The Addams Family	Won
2015	Ovation Awards	Featured Actress in a Musical	Spring Awakening	Nominated
2015	BroadwayWorld LA Awards	Best Featured Actress in a Musical	Spring Awakening	Nominated
2016	Fred and Adele Astaire Awards	Outstanding Ensemble in a Broadway Show	Spring Awakening	Nominated
2016	Broadway.com Audience Awards	Favorite Featured Actress in a Musical	Spring Awakening	Nominated
2020	Outer Critics Circle Awards	Outstanding Featured Actress in a Play	Seared	Honoree
