= List of awards and nominations received by Bernadette Peters =

Bernadette Peters awards and nominations
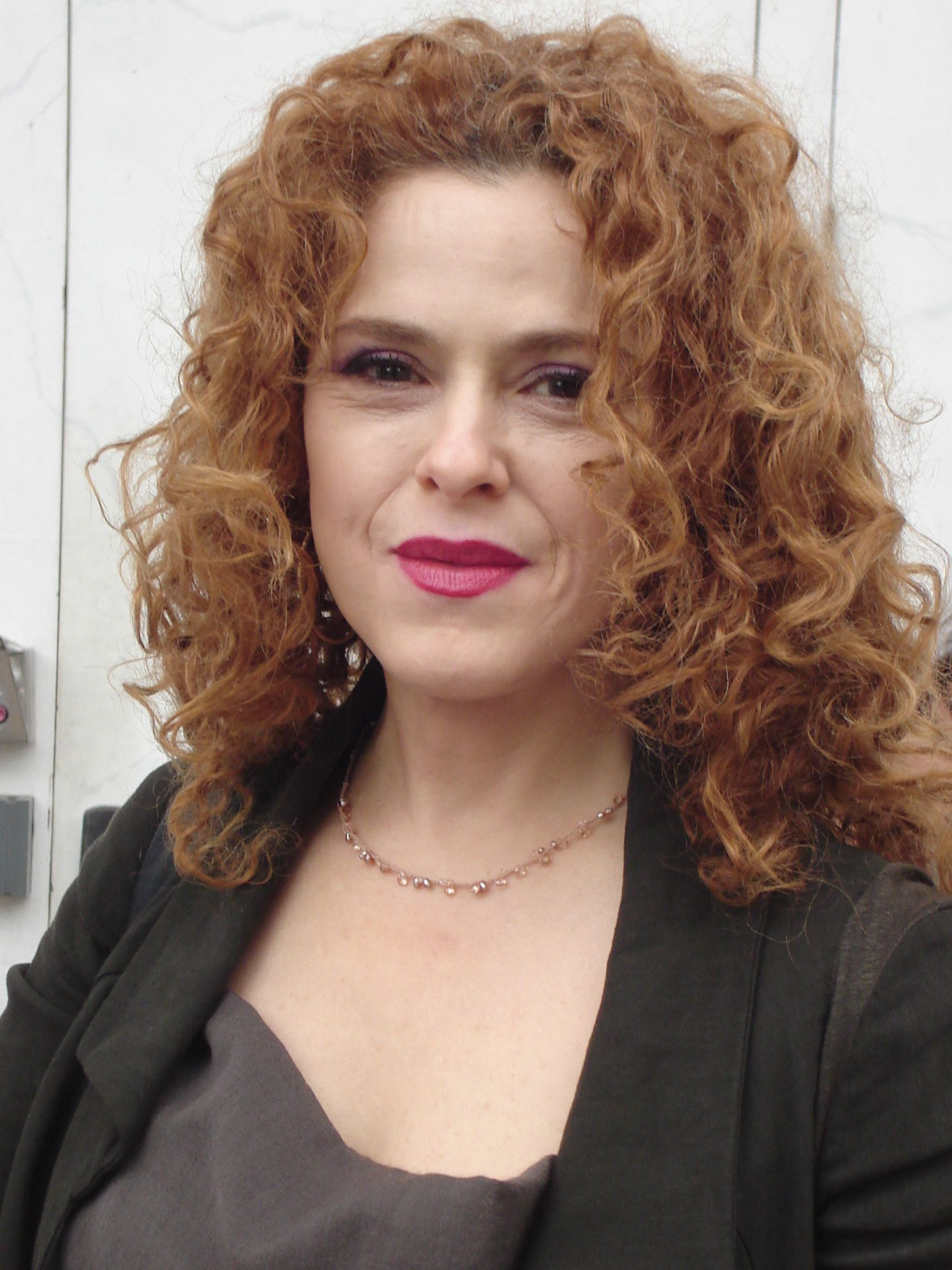
- Peters in 2011
Awards and nominations
Award	Wins	Nominations
Emmy Awards	0	4
Golden Globes	1	3
Grammy Awards	0	4
Tony Awards	2	7

Totals (Note: Certain award groups do not simply award one winner. They acknowledge several different recipients, have runners-up, and have third place. Since this is a specific recognition and is different from losing an award, runner-up mentions are considered wins in this award tally. For simplification and to avoid errors, each award in this list has been presumed to have had a prior nomination.)
- Wins: 61
- Nominations: 132

This article is a List of awards and nominations received by Bernadette Peters

Bernadette Peters is an American actress of the stage and screen. She is known for her extensive work on the Broadway stage including in numerous collaborations with Stephen Sondheim. She has received numerous awards and nominations including win for a Golden Globe Award, two Tony Awards, three Drama Desk Awards, a Drama League Award, an Outer Critics Circle Award, and the Theatre World Award as well as nominations for four Grammy Award and four Emmy Awards. Her honors include a star on the Hollywood Walk of Fame in 1987, an induction into the American Theater Hall of Fame, the Sondheim Award in 2011, and the Isabelle Stevenson Award in 2012.

On stage, she took an early role in the muscial George M! (1968) for which she won the Theatre World Award. That same year she acted in the musical Dames at Sea (1968) for which she won the Drama Desk Award for Outstanding Actress in a Musical. Peters went on Broadway stardom where she earned two Tony Awards for Best Actress in a Musical for her performances as a English girl living in New York in the Andrew Lloyd Webber musical Song and Dance (1986) and for her portrayal of Annie Oakley in the Irving Berlin musical Annie Get Your Gun (1999). She was further Tony-nominated for her roles as a high-spirited taxi driver in On the Town (1971), Mabel Normand in Mack and Mabel (1974), Dot / Marie in Sunday in the Park with George (1984), a former dancer who falls in love in The Goodbye Girl (1993), and Rose in Gypsy (2003).

On film, she played the lead in the musical romance Pennies from Heaven (1981) for which she earned the Golden Globe Award for Best Actress in a Motion Picture – Musical or Comedy. For her role in the Mel Brooks satirical spoof of Horror films, Silent Movie (1976) she was nominated for the Golden Globe Award for Best Supporting Actress – Motion Picture. She also acted in the Steve Martin-led comedy The Jerk (1979), the children's musical comedy Annie (1982), the animated musical Anastasia (1997), and the Jesse Eisenberg directed musical dramedy The Debut (2026).

On television, she took early appearances in The Carol Burnett Show, and The Muppet Show the later of which earned her a nomination for the Primetime Emmy Award for Outstanding Individual Performance in a Variety or Music Program. She starred in the Norman Lear created CBS sitcom All's Fair (1976–1977) for which she was nominated for the Golden Globe Award for Best Actress – Television Series Musical or Comedy. She was further Emmy-nominated for her guest roles as Cassandra Lewis in the legal dramedy series Ally McBeal (2001) and a fearless widow in the musical sitcom Zoey's Extraordinary Playlist (2021). She has also acted in Smash and Mozart in the Jungle.

== Major associations ==
=== Emmy Awards ===
Primetime Emmy Award
Year	Category	Nominated work	Result	Ref.
1978	Outstanding Continuing or Single Performance by a Supporting Actress in a Variety or Music Program	The Muppet Show (episode: "Bernadette Peters")	Nominated	
2001	Outstanding Guest Actress in a Comedy Series	Ally McBeal (episode: "The Getaway + The Obstacle Course")	Nominated	
2021	Outstanding Guest Actress in a Comedy Series	Zoey's Extraordinary Playlist (ep: "Zoey's Extraordinary Girls' Night")	Nominated	
Daytime Emmy Award
2003	Outstanding Performer in a Children's Special	Bobbie's Girl	Nominated	

=== Golden Globe Awards ===
Year	Category	Nominated work	Result	Ref.
1976	Best Actress – Television Series Musical or Comedy	All's Fair	Nominated	
1976	Best Supporting Actress – Motion Picture	Silent Movie	Nominated	
1981	Best Actress – Motion Picture Musical or Comedy	Pennies from Heaven	Won	

=== Grammy Award ===
Year	Category	Nominated work	Result	Ref.
1997	Best Traditional Pop Vocal Album	I'll Be Your Baby Tonight	Nominated	
1998	Best Traditional Pop Vocal Album	Sondheim Etc.- Bernadette Peters Live at Carnegie Hall	Nominated	
2003	Best Traditional Pop Vocal Album	Bernadette Peters Loves Rodgers and Hammerstein	Nominated	
2013	Best Musical Theater Album	Follies: The New Broadway Cast Recording	Nominated	

=== Tony Awards ===
Year	Category	Nominated work	Result	Ref.
1971	Best Supporting or Featured Actress in a Musical	On the Town	Nominated	
1974	Best Leading Actress in a Musical	Mack and Mabel	Nominated	
1984	Best Leading Actress in a Musical	Sunday in the Park with George	Nominated	
1986	Best Leading Actress in a Musical	Song and Dance	Won	
1993	Best Leading Actress in a Musical	The Goodbye Girl	Nominated	
1999	Best Leading Actress in a Musical	Annie Get Your Gun	Won	
2003	Best Leading Actress in a Musical	Gypsy	Nominated	
2012	Isabelle Stevenson Award		Honored	

== Other theatre awards ==
Organizations	Year	Award	Category	Result	Ref.
Drama Desk Award	1968	Outstanding Actress in a Musical	Dames at Sea	Won	
Drama Desk Award	1974	Outstanding Actress in a Musical	Mack and Mabel	Nominated	
Drama Desk Award	1984	Outstanding Actress in a Musical	Sunday in the Park with George	Nominated	
Drama Desk Award	1986	Outstanding Actress in a Musical	Song and Dance	Won	
Drama Desk Award	1987	Outstanding Actress in a Musical	Into the Woods	Nominated	
Drama Desk Award	1999	Outstanding Actress in a Musical	Annie Get Your Gun	Won	
Drama Desk Award	2003	Outstanding Actress in a Musical	Gypsy	Nominated	
Drama Desk Award	2011	Outstanding Actress in a Musical	Follies	Nominated	
Drama League Award	1986	Distinguished Performance	Song and Dance	Won	
Drama League Award	2003	Distinguished Performance	Gypsy	Nominated	
Drama League Award	2018	Distinguished Performance	Hello, Dolly!	Nominated	
Outer Critics Circle Award	1993	Outstanding Actress in a Musical	The Goodbye Girl	Nominated	
Outer Critics Circle Award	1999	Outstanding Actress in a Musical	Annie Get Your Gun	Won	
Sarah Siddons Award	1994	Outstanding Performance	The Goodbye Girl	Won	
Theatre World Award	1968	Theatre World Award	George M!	Honoree	

== Honorary awards ==
Organizations	Year	Notes	Result	Ref.
Hollywood Walk of Fame	1987	Motion Picture Star	Honored	
Hasty Pudding Theatricals	1987	Hasty Pudding Woman of the Year	Honored	
American Theater Hall of Fame	1996	Induction	Honored	
The Actors' Fund	1999	Artistic Achievement Medal	Honored	
Hofstra University	2002	Honorary doctorate	Honored	
Hollywood Bowl Hall of Fame	2002	Induction	Honored	
National Dance Institute	2009	Artistic Honoree Award	Honored	
Signature Theatre	2011	Sondheim Award	Honored	
New Dramatists	2012	Lifetime Achievement Award	Honored	
Drama League Award	2013	Special Award of Distinguished Achievement	Honored	
Drama League Award	2015	Centennial Honoree	Honored	
Theatre World Awards	2016	John Willis Award for Lifetime Achievement	Honored	
Manhattan Theatre Club	2018	Lifetime Achievement Benefit Honoree	Honored	
Princess Grace Foundation	2019	Prince Rainier III Award	Honored	
Chita Rivera Awards	2024	Lifetime Achievement Award	Honored	
