= Bernadette Peters on stage, screen and record =

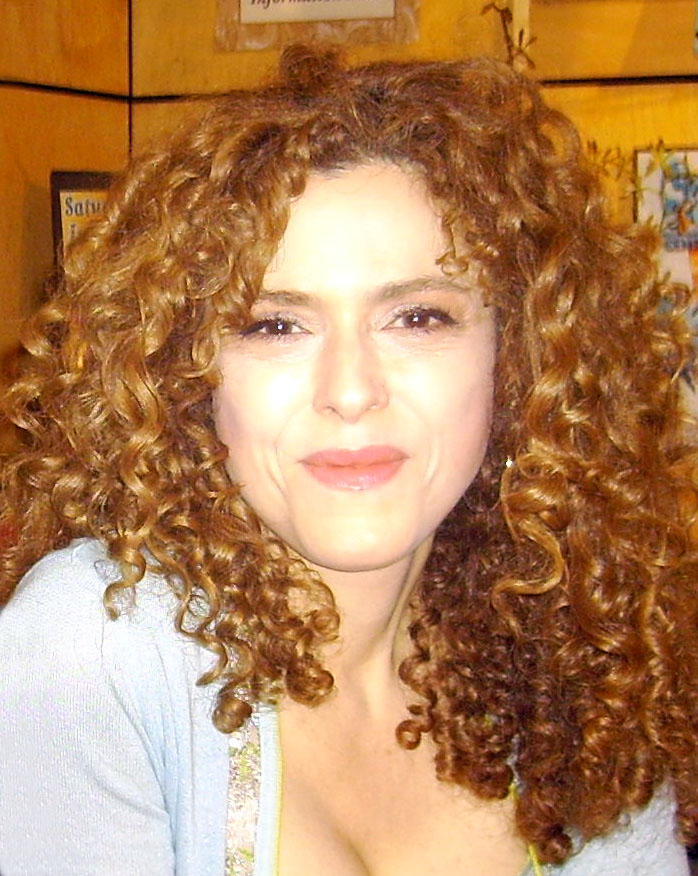
Peters in 2008

Bernadette Peters (born February 28, 1948) is an American actress, singer, and children's book author.

She is a critically acclaimed Broadway performer, having received seven nominations for Tony Awards, winning two (plus an honorary award), and nine nominations for Drama Desk Awards, winning three. Peters has appeared extensively in film and on television, having been nominated for four Emmy Awards and three Golden Globe Awards, winning one. She has also recorded solo albums, and four of her cast albums have won Grammy Awards.

== Performances ==
=== Stage ===
==== Broadway ====
Year	Show	Role	Venue	Ref.
1959	The Most Happy Fella	Tessie	New York City Center	
1967	The Girl in the Freudian Slip	Leslie Maugham	Booth Theatre – Broadway debut (standby)	
1967	Johnny No-Trump	Bettina	Cort Theatre – Closed after one official performance	
1968	George M!	Josie Cohan	Palace Theatre	
1969	La Strada	Gelsomina	Lunt-Fontanne Theatre – Closed after one official performance.	
1971	On the Town	Hildy Esterhazy	Imperial Theatre	
1974	Mack and Mabel	Mabel Normand	Majestic Theatre	
1984	Sunday in the Park with George	Dot/Marie	Booth Theatre	
1985	Song and Dance	Emma	Royale Theatre	
1987	Into the Woods	The Witch	Martin Beck Theatre	
1989	Into the Woods	The Witch	Martin Beck Theatre	
1993	The Goodbye Girl	Paula	Marquis Theatre	
1994	Sunday in the Park with George	Dot/Marie	St. James Theatre – Benefit concert	
1997	Into the Woods	The Witch	Broadway Theatre – Benefit concert	
1999	Annie Get Your Gun	Annie Oakley	Marquis Theatre	
2003	Gypsy	Rose	Shubert Theatre	
2010	A Little Night Music	Desiree Armfeldt	Walter Kerr Theatre; Replacement for Catherine Zeta-Jones (July 2010 – January 2011)	
2011	Follies	Sally Durant Plummer	Marquis Theatre	
2018	Hello, Dolly!	Dolly Gallagher Levi	Shubert Theatre; Replacement for Bette Midler (January – July 2018)	
2025	Stephen Sondheim's Old Friends	Herself/Various	Samuel J. Friedman Theatre	

==== Other ====
Year	Show	Role	Notes	Ref.
1958	This Is Goggle		Professional stage debut	
1961	Gypsy	Thelma/Hawaiian Girl	US National Tour	
1968	Dames at Sea	Ruby	Bouwerie Lane Theatre, Off-Broadway	
1968	A Mother's Kisses	Performer	Three weeks of out-of-town tryouts in New Haven and Baltimore. Cancelled before Broadway premiere.	
1971	Nevertheless, They Laugh	Consuelo	Lamb's Club, New York City, March 1971 (5 performances)	
1971	W.C.	Carlotta Monti	Played only out-of-town from May to October 1971; Never in NYC	
1972	Tartuffe	Dorine	Walnut Street Theatre, Philadelphia, PA	
1973	Dames at Sea	Ruby	Paper Mill Playhouse	
1974	Mack and Mabel	Mabel Normand	San Diego Civic Theatre / Dorothy Chandler Pavilion / The Muny / Kennedy Center	
1982	Sally and Marsha	Sally	Manhattan Theatre Club, Off-Broadway	
1983	Sunday in the Park with George	Dot/Annette	Playwrights Horizons	
1993	The Goodbye Girl	Paula	Shubert Theatre, Chicago	
1995	Anyone Can Whistle	Fay Apple	Carnegie Hall concert	
2011	Follies	Sally Durant Plummer	Kennedy Center, Washington D.C.	
2013	A Bed and a Chair	Performer	New York City Center	
2023	Stephen Sondheim's Old Friends	Herself/Various	Gielgud Theatre, London	
2025	Stephen Sondheim's Old Friends	Herself/Various	Ahmanson Theatre, Los Angeles	

=== Film ===
Year	Title	Role	Notes
1973	Ace Eli and Rodger of the Skies	Allison	
1974	The Longest Yard	Miss Toot	
1976	W.C. Fields and Me	Melody	
1976	Silent Movie	Vilma Kaplan	
1976	Vigilante Force	Little Dee	
1979	The Jerk	Marie	
1981	Tulips	Rutanya Wallace	
1981	Pennies from Heaven	Eileen	
1981	Heartbeeps	Aqua	
1982	Annie	Lily St. Regis	
1989	Slaves of New York	Eleanor	
1989	Pink Cadillac	Lou Ann McGuinn	
1989	Dragon and Slippers	Guinevere	Voice
1990	Alice	Muse	
1991	Impromptu	Marie D'Agoult	
1997	Anastasia	Sophie	Voice
1997	Beauty and the Beast: The Enchanted Christmas	Angelique	Voice, direct-to-video
1998	Barney's Great Adventure	—N/a	Singer, title song
1999	Snow Days	Elise Ellis	
1999	Wakko's Wish	Rita	Voice, direct-to-video
2003	It Runs in the Family	Rebecca Gromberg	
2003	The Land Before Time X: The Great Longneck Migration	Sue	Voice, direct-to-video
2007	Come le formiche	Mary Ann	AKA Wine and Kisses
2011	Coming Up Roses	Diane	Released in 2012
2014	Legends of Oz: Dorothy's Return	Glinda	Voice
2016	10 Little Rubber Ducks	Narrator	Voice
2020	The Broken Hearts Gallery	Eva Woolf	
2021	Tick, Tick... Boom!	"Sunday" Legend	Cameo
2025	Last Train to Fortune	Miss Lily	
2026	The Debut	Serena Cherry	

=== Television ===
Year	Show	Role	Notes
1969–70	The Kraft Music Hall	Herself	4 episodes
1969–78; 1991	The Carol Burnett Show	Herself	11 episodes
1970	Bing Crosby – Cooling It	Herself	TV special
1970	George M!	Josie Cohan	Television film
1971	Paradise Lost	Libby	Television film
1971	The Ed Sullivan Show	Herself–singer	Television appearance
1972	Once Upon a Mattress	Lady Larken	Television film
1973	Love American Style	Nellie	Episode: "Love and the Hoodwinked Honey"
1973	Break Up	Herself	Music comedy special for ABC
1975	Maude	Kathy Griffith	Episode: "Rumpus in the Rumpus Room"
1975	All in the Family	Linda Galloway	Episode: "Gloria Suspects Mike"
1976	Bing Crosby's White Christmas Special	Herself	TV special
1976	McCoy	Brenda Brooks	Episode: "In Again Out Again"
1976	McCloud	B.B. Murchison	Episode: "The Day New York Turned Blue"
1976	Tony Orlando and Dawn	Herself	
1976–77	All's Fair	Charley Drake	24 episodes
1977	The Muppet Show	Herself	Episode: "Bernadette Peters"
1978	The Islander	Trudy Engles	Television film
1980	The Tim Conway Show	Herself	Episode #1.6
1980	The Martian Chronicles	Genevieve Seltzer	Miniseries
1981	Saturday Night Live	Herself (host)	Episode: "Bernadette Peters/Billy Joel/The Go-Go's"
1983	Faerie Tale Theatre	Sleeping Beauty; Princess Debbie	Episode: "Sleeping Beauty"
1986	Sunday in the Park with George	Dot / Marie	Television film
1987	Diana Ross: Red Hot Rhythm & Blues	Herself	TV special
1988	David	Marie Rothenberg	Television film
1990	Fall from Grace	Tammy Faye Bakker	Television film
1990	The Last Best Year	Jane Murray	Television film
1990	Carol & Company	Kate Benton	Episode: "The Jingle Belles"
1991	Into the Woods	The Witch	Television film
1992	The Last Mile	The Soprano	TV short
1993–96	Animaniacs	Rita, Cheshire Cat	Voice, 16 episodes
1994	The Larry Sanders Show	Bernadette Peters	Episode: "Montana"
1995	A Tribute to Stephen Sondheim	Herself	A&E Stage
1997	The Odyssey	Circe	Miniseries
1997	Cinderella	Cinderella's Stepmother	Television film
1997	What the Deaf Man Heard	Helen Ayers	Television film
1997	Holiday in Your Heart	Faith Shawn	Television film
1998	The Closer	Victoria Sherwood	Episode: "Baby, It's Cold Outside"
2000	Inside the Actors Studio	Herself	Episode #7.2
2000	Teacher's Pet	Fifi	Voice, episode: "Fifi"
2001	Frasier	Rachel	Voice, episode: "Sliding Frasiers"
2001	Ally McBeal	Cassandra Lewis	2 episodes
2002	Bobbie's Girl	Bailey Lewis	Television film
2003	Prince Charming	Margo / Titania	Television film
2005	Adopted	Sarah Leaf	Unsold ABC pilot
2006	Will & Grace	Gin	Episode: "Whatever Happened to Baby Gin?"
2006	Law & Order: Special Victims Unit	Stella Danquiss	Episode: "Choreographed"
2007	Boston Legal	Judge Marianna Folger	Episode: "Guantanamo By The Bay"
2008	Grey's Anatomy	Sarabeth Breyers	Episodes: "Dream a Little Dream of Me, Parts 1 & 2”
2008	Living Proof	Barbara Bradfield	Television film
2009	Ugly Betty	Jodie Papadakis	5 episodes
2012–13	Smash	Leigh Conroy	6 episodes
2014–18	Mozart in the Jungle	Gloria Windsor	35 episodes
2014	Girlfriends' Guide to Divorce	Annie	Episode: "Rule #21: Leave Childishness to the Children"
2017–18	The Good Fight	Lenore Rindell	9 episodes
2020	Katy Keene	Ms. Freesia	3 episodes
2020	Take Me to the World: A Sondheim 90th Celebration	Herself	TV special
2020–21	Zoey's Extraordinary Playlist	Deb	3 episodes
2021	Zoey's Extraordinary Christmas	Deb	Television film
2023	High Desert	Rosalyn / Ginger	8 episodes
2025	Celebrity Wheel of Fortune	Herself	1 episode

=== Discography ===
Solo recordings

- Bernadette Peters (1980) MCA. Billboard 200 #114 (retitled and expanded as Bernadette in a 1992 CD reissue)
- "Gee Whiz" (1980) Billboard Hot 100 #31 (single)
- Now Playing (1981) MCA US Billboard 200 #151
- I'll Be Your Baby Tonight (1996) Angel Records – Grammy Award nominee
- Sondheim, Etc. – Bernadette Peters Live At Carnegie Hall (1997) Angel Records – Grammy Award nominee
- Bernadette Peters Loves Rodgers and Hammerstein (2002) Angel Records – Grammy Award nominee
- Sondheim Etc., Etc. Live At Carnegie Hall: The Rest of It (2005) Angel Records
- "Kramer's Song" (2008) Blue Apple Books (single)
- "Stella's Song" (2010) Blue Apple Books (single)

Cast recordings

- George M! – Sony (1968)
- Dames at Sea – Columbia Masterworks (1969)
- Mack and Mabel – MCA (1974)
- Sunday in the Park with George – RCA Records (1984) – Grammy Award winner (Best Cast Show Album, 1985)
- Song and Dance – The Songs – RCA Victor (1985)
- Into the Woods – RCA Victor Records (1988) – Grammy Award winner (Best Musical Cast Show Album, 1989)
- The Goodbye Girl – Columbia Records (1993)
- Anyone Can Whistle Live at Carnegie Hall – Columbia Records (1995)
- Annie Get Your Gun The New Broadway Cast Recording – Angel Records (1999) – Grammy Award winner (Best Musical Show Album, 2000)
- Gypsy The New Broadway Cast Recording – Angel Records (2003) – Grammy Award winner (Best Musical Show Album, 2004)
- Sherry! – Studio Cast Recording – Angel Records (2004)
- Legends of Broadway–Bernadette Peters Compilation (2006) – Sony Masterworks Broadway (Original versions of songs from Dames At Sea, Annie Get Your Gun, Anyone Can Whistle, Sunday in the Park with George, Mack and Mabel, Song and Dance, Into The Woods and Gypsy)
- Follies – PS Classics (2011)

Other recordings

- Dress Casual – selections from Evening Primrose with Mandy Patinkin – CBS Records (1990)
- Flirting with the Edge – John Whelan – Narada (1998)
- Dewey Doo-It Helps Owlie Fly Again – Randall Fraser Publishing (2005)
- "Eloise" stories – audiobook, Simon & Schuster Audio (2015)

==== Concerts ====
Major concerts

- Various venues, summer of 1989: 10-city concert tour with Peter Allen.
- Hollywood Bowl, Los Angeles, California on September 6 and 7, 1996 (solo concert).
- Carnegie Hall, New York City on December 9, 1996 (solo concert with guest singers/dancers, recorded on CD).
- Sydney Opera House, Sydney, Australia on January 7 and 8, 1998 (solo concert).
- Royal Festival Hall, London on September 17, 1998 (solo concert with guest singers/dancers, recorded on video).
- Radio City Music Hall, New York City on June 19, 2002 (solo concert with guest singers).
- Lincoln Center (Avery Fisher Hall), New York City, on May 1, 2006 (solo concert).
- Adelaide Cabaret Festival, Adelaide, Australia, on June 6 and 7, 2009 (solo concert). Peters headlined, and the concert was televised on June 27, 2009, on Foxtel. A DVD of the concert was released in Australia in June 2010.
- Benefit concert, "Bernadette Peters: A Special Concert for Broadway Barks Because Broadway Cares", Minskoff Theatre, New York City on November 9, 2009.

Other notable concerts

- "Sondheim: A Celebration at Carnegie Hall" – June 10, 1992 (broadcast on PBS Great Performances in 1993), singing "Not a Day Goes By" and "Sunday"
- "Hey Mr. Producer! The Musical World of Cameron MacKintosh" – June 7, 1998, singing, among others, "Unexpected Song", "Being Alive" and "You Gotta Have a Gimmick"
- Hollywood Bowl Sondheim Concert – July 8, 2005, performing in the "Opening Doors Medley" and "Being Alive".
- "Sondheim: The Birthday Concert", the New York Philharmonic at Lincoln Center's Avery Fisher Hall, a celebration of Sondheim's 80th birthday – March 15 and 16, 2010. Peters sang "Move On" with Mandy Patinkin and "Not a Day Goes By".
