= Lynne Meadow =

American theatre producer, director, and teacher

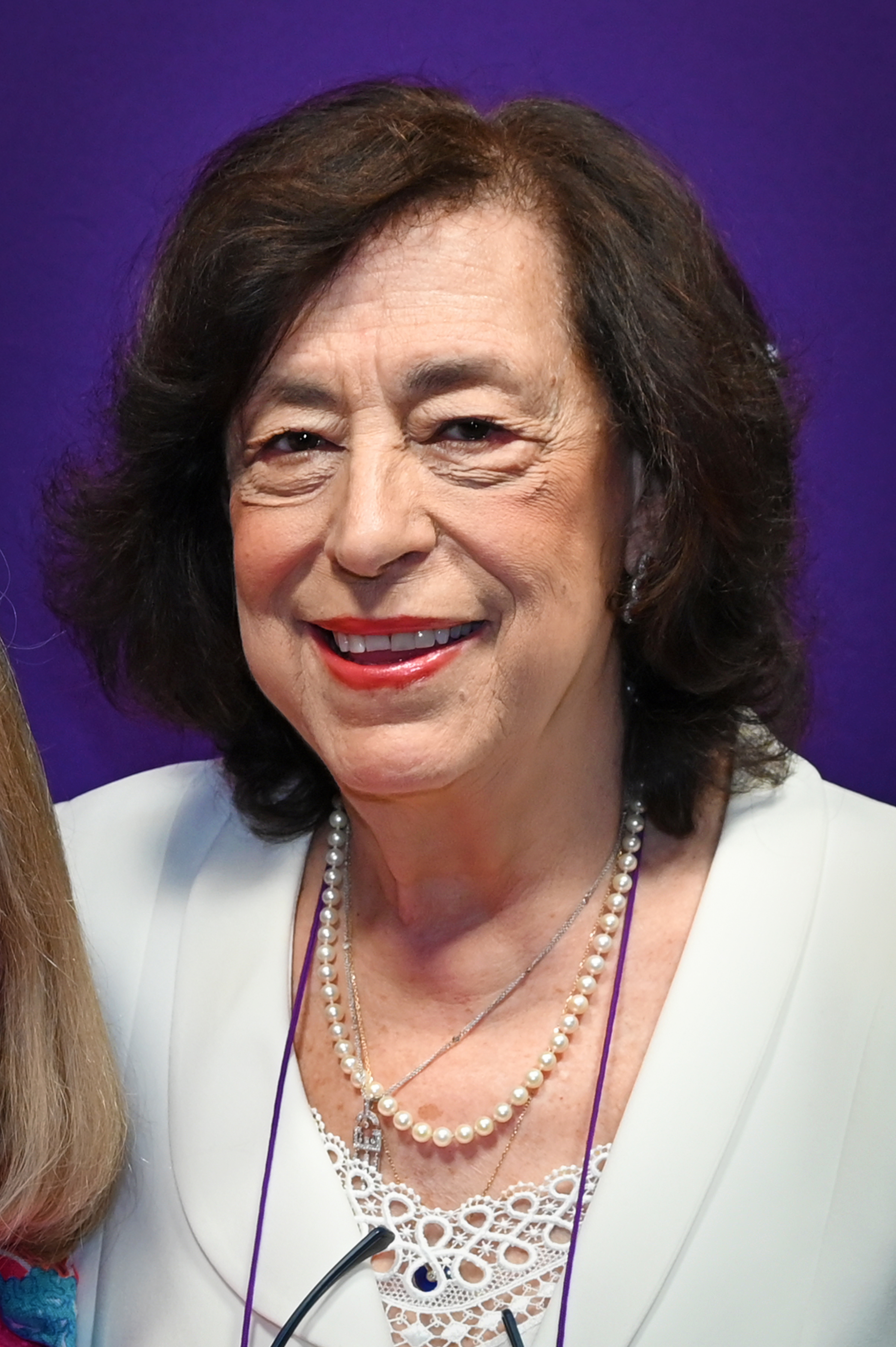
Meadow in 2026

Lynne Meadow is an American theatre producer, director and a teacher. She has been the artistic director of the Manhattan Theatre Club since 1972.

== Career ==
A cum laude graduate of Bryn Mawr, Meadow attended the Yale School of Drama.

In 1972, she joined the Manhattan Theatre Club as Artistic Director, and in that position, she has directed and produced more than 600 New York City and world premieres of plays by American and international playwrights, including Terrence McNally, Beth Henley, John Guare, Athol Fugard, Brian Friel, Harold Pinter, Alan Ayckbourn, John Patrick Shanley, David Auburn, Jocelyn Bioh, Joshua Harmon, James Graham, David Lindsay-Abaire, Martyna Majok, Tarell McCraney, Nick Payne, Simon Stephens and Florian Zeller.

Under Meadow's leadership, MTC has been honored with every prestigious theatre award, including 31 Tony Awards, seven Pulitzer Prizes for Drama, 49 Obie Awards, and 54 Drama Desk Awards, as well as New York Drama Critics' Circle Awards, Outer Critics Circle Awards, and Theatre World Awards. In 2013, she was inducted into the American Theater Hall of Fame.

Meadow's directing credits include Sally and Marsha, The Tale of the Allergist's Wife, Absent Friends and The Commons of Pensacola (2013).

Meadow has directed productions for The New York Shakespeare Festival, the Alliance Theatre, the Phoenix Theatre, the Spoleto Festival and the O’Neill Theatre Center. She has also directed for The 24 Hour Plays.

Meadow has taught at Yale University, Fordham University, NYU, Circle in the Square Theatre School, and Stony Brook University.

On June 26, 2025, Meadow announced her plans to step into the role of Artistic Advisor at Manhattan Theatre Club during the next season.

== Personal ==
She is married to attorney Ronald Shechtman.

In 2008 Meadow made national headlines when an argument with a flight attendant led to her being detained and interrogated by the FBI. Meadow subsequently sued Continental Airlines and the flight attendant for "emotional distress and humiliation and for providing her with faulty equipment on the flight."

== Education ==
- Bryn Mawr Board of Trustees
- Herbert Brodkin Fellow at Yale

== Awards ==
- Lucille Lortel Award for Lifetime Achievement
- Lilly Award for Lifetime Achievement
- Museum of the City of New York’s Auchincloss Prize
- Lee Reynolds Award from the League of Professional Theatre Women
- Manhattan Award from Manhattan magazine
- Person of the Year from the National Theatre Conference
- Margo Jones Award
- Mr. Abbot award for Lifetime Achievement from the Stage Directors Foundation
- She has twice been nominated for Best Director at the Drama Desk Awards: in 1996 for Leslie Ayvazian’s Nine Armenians and in 1988 for Alan Ayckbourn’s Woman in Mind with Stockard Channing.

== Directing credits ==
Sources: Internet Off-Broadway Database; Internet Broadway Database

- 1974: Mark Medoff’s The Wager
- 1974: Corinne Jacker’s Bits and Pieces
- 1975: Clifford Odets’ Golden Boy
- 1976: The Pokey
- 1977: David Rudkin's Ashes (Obie Award)
- 1977: Peter Nichols’ Chez Nous
- 1978: Istvan Orkeny's Catsplay
- 1979: Joanna M. Glass’ Artichoke
- 1979: David Edgar's The Jail Diary of Albie Sachs
- 1980: S.N. Behrman's Biography
- 1980: Steve Metcalf's Vikings
- 1981: Simon Gray’s Close of Play
- 1982: Anton Chekhov's Three Sisters
- 1982: Sybille Pearson’s Sally and Marsha
- 1984: Israel Horovitz's Park Your Car in Harvard Yard
- 1986: Richard Nelson's Principia Scriptoriae
- 1988: Alan Ayckbourn's Woman in Mind (Drama Desk nomination, Best Director)
- 1989: Lee Blessing's Eleemosynary
- 1991: Alan Ayckbourn’s Absent Friends
- 1992: Alan Ayckbourn's A Small Family Business
- 1993: Donald Margulies’ The Loman Family Picnic
- 1996: Leslie Ayvazian's Nine Armenians (Drama Desk nomination)
- 1999: Frederick Freyer and Patrick Cook's Captains Courageous
- 2000: Charles Busch’s The Tale of the Allergist’s Wife
- 2001: Melanie Marnich's Blur
- 2003: Neil Simon's Rose's Dilemma
- 2003: Marsha Norman's Last Dance
- 2005: Ron Hutchinson's Moonlight and Magnolias
- 2006: David Greig's The American Pilot
- 2007: Charles Busch's Our Leading Lady
- 2010: Donald Margulies’ Collected Stories
- 2011: Margaret Edson's Wit
- 2013: Richard Greenberg's The Assembled Parties
- 2013: Amanda Peet’s The Commons of Pensacola
- 2015: Melissa Ross’ Of Good Stock
- 2016: Richard Greenberg’s Our Mother’s Brief Affair
- 2017: Penelope Skinner’s Linda
- 2019: Bekah Brunstetter’s The Cake
- 2020: Richard Greenberg’s The Perplexed

== Selected world/New York premieres produced under Meadows' artistic direction ==
Sources: Internet Off-Broadway Database; Internet Broadway database

- 1978: Richard Maltby Jr.& Murray Horowitz’ Ain’t Misbehavin’: The Fats Waller Musical
- 1981: Beth Henley’s Crimes of the Heart
- 1982: Simone Benmusa’s The Singular Life of Albert Nobbs
- 1984: Beth Henley’s The Miss Firecracker Contest
- 1987: Terrence McNally’s Frankie and Johnny in the Clair de Lune
- 1988: Richard Greenberg’s Eastern Standard
- 1990: August Wilson’s The Piano Lesson
- 1991: Terrence McNally’s Lips Together, Teeth Apart
- 1991: Stephen Sondheim’s Putting It Together
- 1993: Charlayne Woodard’s Pretty Fire
- 1993: Athol Fugard’s Playland
- 1994: Terrence McNally’s Love! Valour! Compassion!
- 1995: A.R. Gurney’s Sylvia
- 1999: David Lindsay-Abaire’s Fuddy Meers
- 2000: David Auburn’s Proof
- 2000: Charles Busch’s The Tale of the Allergist’s Wife
- 2004: Donald Margulies’ Sight Unseen (Pulitzer Prize finalist)
- 2004: John Patrick Shanley’s Doubt
- 2006: Conor McPherson’s Shining City
- 2006: David Lindsay-Abaire’s Rabbit Hole
- 2007: Alfred Uhry’s LoveMusik suggested by the letters of Kurt Weill and Lotte Lenya
- 2007: David Harrower’s Blackbird
- 2009: George S. Kaufman’s and Edna Ferber’s The Royal Family
- 2009: Lynn Nottage’s Ruined (Pulitzer Prize)
- 2009: Donald Margulies’ Time Stands Still (play)
- 2010: Lee Hall’s The Pitmen Painters
- 2011: David Lindsay-Abaire’s Good People
- 2012: David Auburn’s The Columnist
- 2012: David Ives’ Venus in Fur
- 2012 & 2019: Tarell McCraney’s Choir Boy
- 2015 & 2016: Simon Stephens’ Heisenberg
- 2015: Nick Payne’s Constellations
- 2016: Florian Zeller’s The Father
- 2017 & 2022: Martyna Majok’s Cost of Living
- 2019: James Graham’s Ink
- 2022 & 2024: Joshua Harmon’s Prayer for the French Republic
- 2023: David Auburn’s Summer, 1976
- 2023: Jocelyn Bioh's Jaja's African Hair Braiding
- 2024: Jonathan Spector’s Eureka Day
- 2025: Stephen Sondheim's Old Friends
