= List of awards and nominations received by David Hyde Pierce =

List of David Hyde Pierce awards
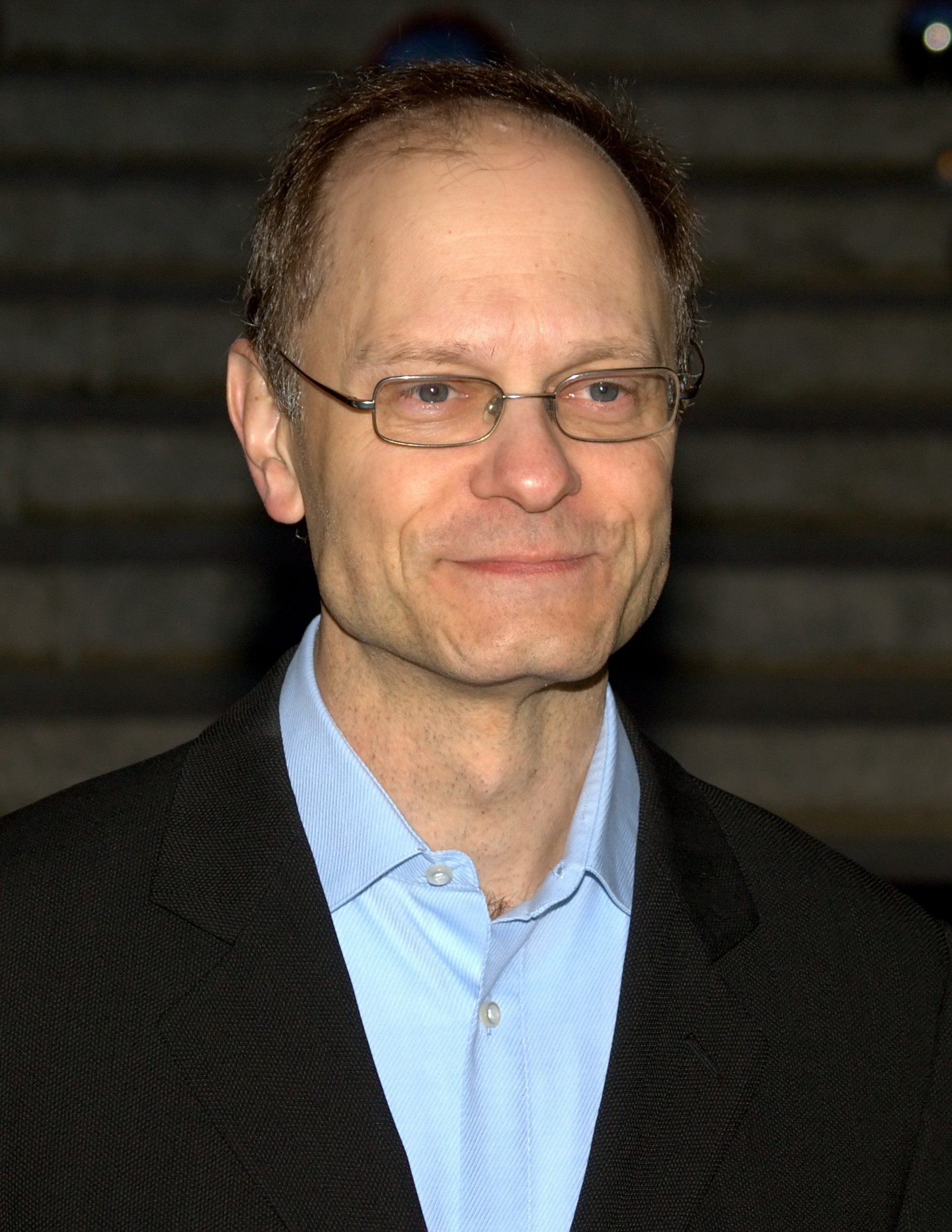
- Pierce in New York City in 2010
Award	Wins	Nominations
Golden Globe Awards	0	5
Grammy Awards	0	1
Primetime Emmy Awards	4	11
Screen Actors Guild Awards	2	19
Tony Awards	1	3
Overall	7	39

David Hyde Pierce is an American actor, director and comedian of the stage and screen. Over his career has received four Primetime Emmy Awards, two Screen Actors Guild Awards, and a Tony Award as well as nominations for five Golden Globe Awards and a Grammy Awards.

He is most known for his performance as the psychiatrist Dr. Niles Crane on the critically acclaimed NBC hit sitcom Frasier (1993-2004) winning four Primetime Emmy Awards for Outstanding Supporting Actor in a Comedy Series. He is also known for his films roles including Terry Gilliam's The Fisher King (1991), Nora Ephron's Sleepless in Seattle (1993), Mike Nichols' Wolf (1994), and Oliver Stone's Nixon (1995). He is also known for his performances in the cult comedy Wet Hot American Summer (2001), the romantic comedy Down with Love (2003), and the dark comedy film The Perfect Host (2010). Pierce is also known for voicing roles Disney Pixar's A Bug's Life (1998), Osmosis Jones (2001), and Treasure Planet (2002).

On Broadway, he won the Tony Award for Best Leading Actor in a Musical for his performance in the musical comedy Curtains (2007). Pierce is also known for his work on stage including for his Broadway roles include Sir Robin in Monty Python's Spamalot (2005), Vanya in Vanya and Sonia and Masha and Spike (2013) and Horace Vandergelder in Hello, Dolly! (2017). In 2010 he received the Isabelle Stevenson Award for his philanthropic work.

== Major associations ==
=== Emmy Awards ===
Year	Category	Nominated work	Result	Ref.
Primetime Emmy Awards
1994	Outstanding Supporting Actor in a Comedy Series	Frasier (episode: "A Midwinter Night’s Dream" + "Author, Author")	Nominated	
1995	Outstanding Supporting Actor in a Comedy Series	Frasier (episode: "Flour Child" + "An Affair to Forget")	Won	
1996	Outstanding Supporting Actor in a Comedy Series	Frasier (episode: "The Last Time I Saw Maris" + "Moon Dance")	Nominated	
1997	Outstanding Supporting Actor in a Comedy Series	Frasier (episode: "Mixed Doubles" + "Daphne Hates Sherry")	Nominated	
1998	Outstanding Supporting Actor in a Comedy Series	Frasier (episode: "The Maris Counselor" + "First Date")	Won	
1999	Outstanding Supporting Actor in a Comedy Series	Frasier (episode: "Merry Christmas, Mrs. Moskowitz" + "Three Valentines")	Won	
2000	Outstanding Supporting Actor in a Comedy Series	Frasier (episode: "Rivals" + "A Tsar is Born")	Nominated	
2001	Outstanding Supporting Actor in a Comedy Series	Frasier (episode: "Daphne Returns" + "Hooping Cranes")	Nominated	
2002	Outstanding Supporting Actor in a Comedy Series	Frasier (episode: "Room Full of Heroes" + "Deathtrap")	Nominated	
2003	Outstanding Supporting Actor in a Comedy Series	Frasier (episode: "Roe to Perdition" + "Fraternal Schwins")	Nominated	
2004	Outstanding Supporting Actor in a Comedy Series	Frasier (episode: "No Sex Please We’re Skittish" + "Goodnight, Seattle")	Won	

=== Golden Globe Award ===
Year	Category	Nominated work	Result	Ref.
1994	Best Supporting Actor – Television Series	Frasier	Nominated	
1995	Best Supporting Actor – Television Series	Frasier	Nominated	
1996	Best Supporting Actor – Television Series	Frasier	Nominated	
1997	Best Supporting Actor – Television Series	Frasier	Nominated	
2000	Best Supporting Actor – Television Series	Frasier	Nominated	

=== Grammy Award ===
Year	Category	Nominated work	Result	Ref.
2010	Best Spoken Word Album for Children	The Phantom Tollbooth	Nominated	

=== Screen Actors Guild Award ===
Year	Category	Nominated work	Result	Ref.
1994	Outstanding Ensemble in a Comedy Series	Frasier	Nominated	
1994	Outstanding Actor in a Comedy Series	Frasier	Nominated	
1995	Outstanding Cast in a Motion Picture	Nixon	Nominated	
1995	Outstanding Ensemble in a Comedy Series	Frasier	Nominated	
1995	Outstanding Actor in a Comedy Series	Frasier	Won	
1996	Outstanding Ensemble in a Comedy Series	Frasier	Nominated	
1996	Outstanding Actor in a Comedy Series	Frasier	Nominated	
1997	Outstanding Ensemble in a Comedy Series	Frasier	Nominated	
1997	Outstanding Actor in a Comedy Series	Frasier	Nominated	
1998	Outstanding Ensemble in a Comedy Series	Frasier	Nominated	
1998	Outstanding Actor in a Comedy Series	Frasier	Nominated	
1999	Outstanding Ensemble in a Comedy Series	Frasier	Won	
1999	Outstanding Actor in a Comedy Series	Frasier	Nominated	
2000	Outstanding Ensemble in a Comedy Series	Frasier	Nominated	
2000	Outstanding Actor in a Comedy Series	Frasier	Nominated	
2001	Outstanding Ensemble in a Comedy Series	Frasier	Nominated	
2001	Outstanding Actor in a Comedy Series	Frasier	Nominated	
2002	Outstanding Ensemble in a Comedy Series	Frasier	Nominated	
2003	Outstanding Ensemble in a Comedy Series	Frasier	Nominated	

=== Tony Awards ===
Year	Category	Nominated work	Result	Ref.
2007	Best Actor in a Musical	Curtains	Won	
2010	Isabelle Stevenson Award		Won	
2013	Best Actor in a Play	Vanya and Sonia and Masha and Spike	Nominated	
2017	Best Actor in a Musical	Hello, Dolly!	Nominated	

== Theatre awards ==
=== Drama Desk Awards ===
Year	Category	Nominated work	Result	Ref.
2005	Outstanding Actor in a Musical	Spamalot	Nominated	
2006	Outstanding Actor in a Musical	Curtains	Won	
2016	Outstanding Actor in a Play	A Life	Nominated	

=== Drama League Award ===
Year	Category	Nominated work	Result	Ref.
2016	Outstanding Actor in a Play	A Life	Nominated	
2018	Distinguished Performance	Hello, Dolly!	Nominated	

=== Outer Critics Circle Award ===
Year	Category	Nominated work	Result	Ref.
2016	Outstanding Actor in a Play	A Life	Nominated	
2018	Outstanding Actor in a Musical	Hello Dolly!	Nominated	

== Audio awards ==
=== Audie Awards ===
Year	Category	Nominated work	Result	Ref.
2000	Multi-Voiced Presentation	In the Name of Security	Nominated	
2004	Children's Title for Ages Up to Eight	Green Eggs and Ham and Other Servings of Dr. Seuss	Nominated	
