= Samuel Bernstein =

American screenwriter

Samuel Garza Bernstein
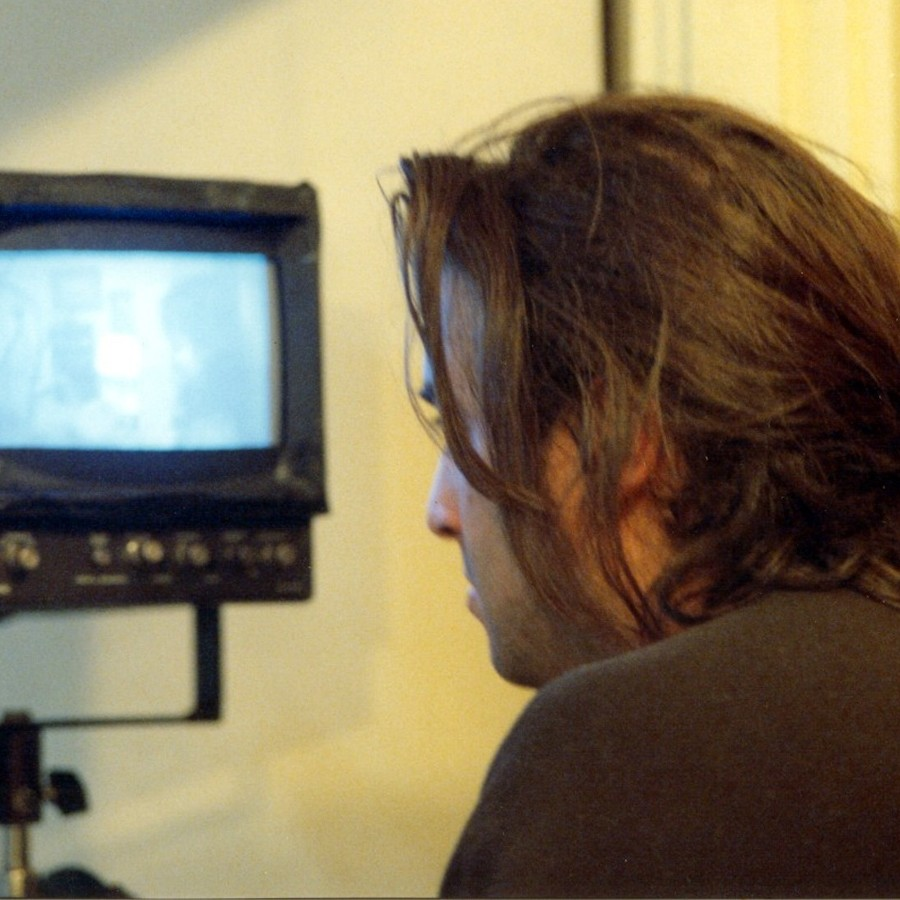
- Born: 1970 (age 55–56)
- Occupations: Author, screenwriter, director
- Spouse: Ronald Shore
- Writing career
- Subjects: Humor, family, child and sexual abuse, gay

Samuel Garza Bernstein (born 1970) is an American screenwriter, playwright, director and author who grew up all over the world, living in Cairo, Honolulu, Austin, Phoenix, Albuquerque, New York City, Los Angeles, and Ft. Collins, Colorado, while his family also traveled through Asia, Africa, Europe, and the Caribbean. He is co-founder of Babyhead Productions with husband Ronald Shore. The couple have been together since 1994, and were married in a Jewish ceremony in 1996, then in Vancouver, Canada in 2003 when it became legal for same sex couples to marry, and then again in 2013 in West Hollywood, California, after the Supreme Court struck down Proposition 8. He is also a volunteer Court Appointed Special Advocate (CASA) for foster children in Los Angeles County.

== Awards ==
Writers Guild of America Writers Access Project Honoree (2018)

London Independent Film Awards Best Original Screenplay Elephant & Castle (2017)

British Independent Film Festival Special Citation Elephant & Castle (2016)

Anna Sosenko Trust Grant Mr. Confidential

New York Musical Theatre Festival Performance Award Mr. Confidential (2014)

eLit Silver Medal Lulu (2010)

Foreword Book of the Year Finalist (Biography) Mr. Confidential: The Man, His Magazine & The Movieland Massacre That Changed Hollywood Forever (2006)

GLAAD Nominee Best TV Film (2003); Emmy Nomination Bernadette Peters; Advocate Top Ten Television Events of the Year Bobbie's Girl (2002)

Houston International Film Festival Gold Award, Charleston International Film Festival Silver Award Silent Lies (1996)

American Library Association Stonewall Book Award for Non-Fiction (1995)

== Biography ==
Samuel Garza Bernstein has written stage plays and musicals, television shows, movies, and books; working in Los Angeles, New York, and London. He dove into show business immediately upon graduating high school in Texas, moving to New York at the age of 17. After studying at the American Academy of Dramatic Arts he began to work as an actor and singer, most notably playing the role of "Magaldi" in various productions of Evita. In the early 90s he started writing, and his first play, "The Liquidation of Granny Peterman," was produced in Hollywood. The Los Angeles Times said, "Samuel Bernstein's insights into what keeps families together are as rich as a holiday pudding."

While writing and rewriting the script that would become his first film, Silent Lies, he worked on his first book, a photo-anthology called "Uncommon Heroes" that won a Stonewall Book Award from the American Library Association in 1996. Bernstein and his partner on the project, Phillip Sherman, tied with writer Dorothy Allison. His book about the rise and fall of Confidential (magazine) in the 1950s, "Mr. Confidential" was published by Walford Press in 2007 and Liz Smith proclaimed that, "It reads like a house afire in a sultry swamp!". He adapted the project with composer David Snyder as a stage musical that premiered in 2014 at the New York Musical Theatre Festival.

Among his many other film and television projects, one of his favorites is Bobbie's Girl which starred Bernadette Peters, Rachel Ward, and Jonathan Silverman, and marked the film debut of Thomas Sangster, the young actor who would go on to star in Love, Actually and Nanny McPhee among his many other films. Bernadette Peters received an Emmy nomination while the film received a Gay and Lesbian Alliance Against Defamation nomination and a citation from The Advocate as one of the top ten television events of the year.

== Bibliography ==
- Uncommon Heroes (1994)
- Mr. Confidential (2007)
- Lulu (2010)
- Starting Joan Crawford:The Films, the Fantasy, and the Modern Relevance of a Silver Screen Icon (2024)

== Filmography ==
- Silent Lies (1996)
- Icing on the Cake (2000)
- Sally B. (2001)
- Bobbie's Girl (2002)
- Judging Amy (2004)
- W.I.T.C.H. (2005-2006)
- Kill Your Inner Child (2007)
- Sarge (2010)
- Mr. Confidential (2014)
- Shimmer & Shine (2017)
- Elephant & Castle (2017)
- Miracle on a String (2017)
- After Forever (2023)
