= Mary-Mitchell Campbell =

American music director, orchestrator and philanthropist

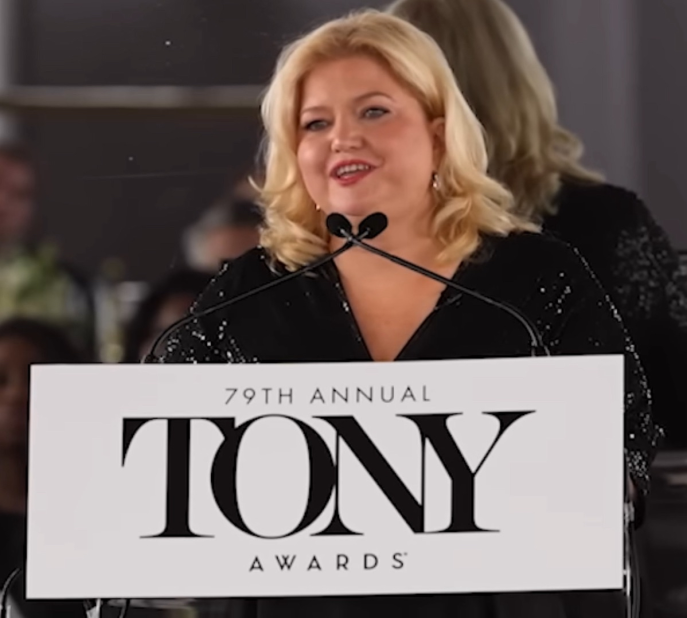
- Campbell in 2026
- Education: Furman University
- Occupations: Music director, orchestrator, philanthropist

Mary-Mitchell Campbell is an American music director, orchestrator and philanthropist. A frequent collaborator of Andrew Lippa, she won a Drama Desk Award and was nominated for two more in the category Outstanding Orchestrations for the musicals Company, Hello Again and Allegro.

At the 79th Tony Awards, she received the Isabelle Stevenson Award, "in recognition of her advocacy work".
