= Bonnie Burroughs =

American actress (born 1961)

- Born: February 3, 1961 (age 65); Athens, Georgia, U.S.
- Occupation: Actress
- Years active: 1987–present

Bonnie Burroughs (born February 3, 1961) is an American actress. She potrayed Gladys Corbin on the American soap opera General Hospital.

== Career ==
Burroughs guest-starred in numerous television programs including Newhart, Boston Legal, Judging Amy, Suddenly Susan, Malcolm in the Middle, My Two Dads, Desperate Housewives, CSI: Crime Scene Investigation, Dallas, Jake and the Fatman, ER, Hunter and Matlock. She was cast as Stacey Giordano on One Life to Live from 1987. Burroughs was then cast as Dr. Jamie Lawrence on Santa Barbara from 1990 to 1991. She was also cast as Gretchen Lindquist on Days of Our Lives. In 2009, Burroughs starred on the television series Rockville, CA, being cast as Shawn Petrers.

In 2019, Burroughs was cast as Gladys Corbin on General Hospital. She exited the series in 2023.

== Filmography ==
=== Film ===
Year	Title	Role	Notes
1990	Hard to Kill	Felicia Storm	
1996	Silent Lies	Ruby Saltemeir	
1999	One Small Hero	Mrs. Cooper	
2009	Wearing Hitler's Pants	Waitress At The Deli	
2010	Easy A	Micah's Mom	
2014	Life After Beth	Woman Zombie	
2015	Day Out of Days	Rachel	
2017	Tangoborn Menclenty	Slideshow Hostess	
2019	Sunrise in Heaven	Adult Jan	
2020	Horse Girl	Wanda	

=== Television ===
Year	Title	Role	Notes
1987	Houston Knights	Holly Devane	Episode: "Desperado"
1987	One Life to Live	Stacey Giordano	Episode #1.4744
1989	Newhart	Anastasia Dupont	Episode: "Hi, Society"
1989	Naked Lie	Mary Kyle	Television film
1989	Dallas	Alison Kincaid	Episode: "And Away We Go!"
1989	My Two Dads	Courtney Nichols	Episode: "That's No Lady, That's My Mother"
1990	Paradise	Constance Field	Episode: "The Chase"
1990	Jake and the Fatman	Marilyn Murphy	Episode: "Only You"
1990–1991	Santa Barbara	Dr. Jamie Lawrence	6 episodes
1991	Equal Justice	Carla Siditski	Episode: "Do No Harm"
1991	Hunter	Laura Rhodes	Episode: "Ex Marks the Spot"
1991	Days of Our Lives	Gretchen Lindquist	24 episodes
1991	Baby of the Bride	Carey Lanely	Television film
1992	Silk Stalkings	Claire Hollinger	Episode: "Squeeze Play"
1992, 1993	Matlock	Cissy Lockwood / Lorraine Ortega	2 episodes
1993	Raven	Joanne Delaney	Episode: "Poisoned Harvest"
1993	Time Trax	Dr. Ellen Mallory	Episode: "Forgotten Tomorrows"
1994	Tonya & Nancy: The Inside Story	Dody Teachman	Television film
1996	Land's End	Cora Lucas	Episode: "Long Arm of the Law"
1996	Moloney	Carole	Episode: "Nothing But the Truth"
1997	Suddenly Susan	Victoria	Episode: "What a Card"
1997	Arliss	Sharon Giles	Episode: "The Value of Loyalty"
2000	Family Law	President's Jury	Episode: "A Mother's Son"
2001	Providence	Mom	Episode: "Love Story"
2001	ER	Candy	Episode: "Blood, Sugar, Sex, Magic"
2002	CSI: Crime Scene Investigation	Dusty	Episode: "The Hunger Artist"
2002	Malcolm in the Middle	Fake Mom	Episode: "Forwards Backwards"
2003	Crossing Jordan	Mom O'Day	Episode: "Wild Card"
2003	Judging Amy	Patricia Rollins	Episode: "Sex and the Single Mother"
2005	Desperate Housewives	Bree's Lawyer	Episode: "Your Fault"
2005	Over There	Jan	3 episodes
2007	The Closer	Nurse	Episode: "Dumb Luck"
2007	Boston Legal	Lauren Delhorn	Episode: "Hope and Glory"
2007	Wizards of Waverly Place	Mrs. Taylor	Episode: "Disenchanted Evening"
2008	Eli Stone	Hope Foster	Episode: "I Want Your Sex"
2008	Moonlight	Julie Fordham	Episode: "What's Left Behind"
2008	Cold Case	Julie Reed '08	Episode: "Roller Girl"
2009	Heroes	Female Coroner	Episode: "Into Asylum"
2009	Prison Break	Nurse	Episode: "Rate of Exchange"
2009	Rockville CA	Shawn Peters	17 episodes
2010	Sons of Tucson	Louise	Episode: "Ron Quits"
2010	The Mentalist	Jodi Dahl	Episode: "Red Carpet Treatment"
2010	Undercovers	Diane Cresswell	Episode: "Crashed"
2011	Perfect Couples	Maureen	Episode: "Perfect House"
2011	Breaking In	Mrs. Sparks	Episode: "White on White on White"
2011	The Protector	Brooke Arkin	Episode: "Blood"
2011	CSI: NY	Linda Frazier	Episode: "Air Apparent"
2012	Shameless	Bev	Episode: "Father's Day"
2012	Justified	Hanna Napier	Episode: "Guy Walks Into a Bar"
2012	Private Practice	Instructor	Episode: "Life Support"
2013	Parenthood	Linda	Episode: "The M Word"
2013	It's Always Sunny in Philadelphia	Cop	Episode: "The Gang Makes Lethal Weapon 6"
2014	Perception	Mrs. Grant	Episode: "Bolero"
2014	Legends	'Lincoln's' Ex-Wife	Episode: "Pilot"
2014	The Bridge	Nurse	Episode: "Lamia"
2014	The Brittany Murphy Story	Kelly	Television film
2014	How to Get Away with Murder	Mrs. Stangard	Episode: "He Deserved to Die"
2015	Love & Loathing: Adventures in Divorce Land	Bonnie	Television film
2016	The Fosters	Mrs. Olmstead	Episode: "Now for Then"
2016	Insecure	Susan	Episode: "Thirsty as Fuck"
2016	Rosewood	Lynn Spencer	Episode: "Tree Toxins & Three Stories"
2017	2 Broke Girls	Stacy	Episode: "And the Tease Time"
2019–2023	General Hospital	Gladys Corbin	Recurring role
