= Silent Lies =

- Directed by: Peter Kiwitt
- Written by: Samuel Bernstein
- Produced by: Mark Terry; Samuel Bernstein; Holly MacConkey; Gloria Pryor
- Starring: Elizabeth Anne Allen; Michael Harris; Cedrik Terrell; Dana Daurey; Bonnie Burroughs
- Cinematography: Dermott Downs
- Edited by: Dick Darling; Susan Demskey; Alexander Garcia; Debra Goldfield
- Music by: Phillip Kimbrough
- Distributed by: Image Entertainment
- Release date: October 10, 1996
- Running time: 93 minutes
- Country: United States
- Language: English

Silent Lies is a 1996 American drama film directed by Peter Kiwitt and written and co-produced by Samuel Bernstein. Released on October 10, 1996, through Image Entertainment, the film stars Elizabeth Anne Allen as a bright high school senior whose life is turned upside down when her abusive father returns to her life.

== Plot ==
Shelly Saltemeir is an overachieving senior student in her last year of high school in a small Texas town. She works part-time to provide for her 14-year-old sister Tanya and her deadbeat stepmother, Ruby. Unknown to her family and friends, Shelly is plagued with nightmares of the incestuous sexual abuse she received from her father Carl, who groomed and regularly raped her when she was a child. Carl then fled to Mexico to avoid the authorities over a busted drug deal, and Shelly eventually became aware of her abuse as she grew into her teen years. As a result of her ordeal, Shelly is protective over Tanya.

One day returning home, Shelly is shocked to see Carl, whose charges were dropped after charming his way through the authorities. While Ruby and Tanya are overjoyed at his return, Shelly feigns happiness while secretly dreading his presence, especially when it is clear he is still sexually attracted to her now she has grown up. Carl begins noticing that his inappropriate actions make Shelly uncomfortable. Shelly's paranoia around her father causes her nightmares to aggravate and her to feel nauseous.

Shelly manages to become valedictorian and is gifted a car by her father; she takes it on a ride with Tanya and she proposes that they escape town together, but she is unable to convince Tanya that they are unsafe around Carl. She fends off another sexual advance by her father; due to believing Carl would sway the police to his side if she reports him, she comes up with a plan to kill him instead. Having overheard him planning another drug deal, Shelly proposes to her best friend Raymond that he pose as Carl's drug dealer, lure him to a remote site, and kill him there before staging it as a drug deal gone wrong. Raymond agrees to the plan after Shelly confesses her abuse. Shelly realizes Carl has begun grooming Tanya, and, after stopping Carl from potentially harming her, is beaten by her father.

After Raymond manages to convince Carl's contact about being Carl's dealer, Raymond admits his feelings for Shelly. Shelly comes home to see Carl had taken Tanya out to town and gotten her drunk. Knowing what he could do to her sister, she diverts Carl's attention to her by suggestively touching him; he later goes to her room and she reluctantly allows her father to have sex with her. As Shelly begins retrieving items to stage her father's murder, Carl follows and later violently confronts his daughter about what she is doing. Shelly lies and says she wanted to buy gifts to surprise him for his birthday, calming him down.

The next day, Shelly and Raymond arrive at the site of the deal, an abandoned cabin, where they prepare for Carl's arrival. Shelly fires at a figure which turns out to be Tanya, who Carl brought along with her, possibly to rape her. After patching up the seriously injured Tanya, Shelly, Raymond, and Carl scuffle around the cabin. Carl manages to gain the upper hand and holds Raymond and Shelly at gunpoint before he is finally gunned down by Tanya. A traumatized Shelly is unable to proceed with her plan, so Raymond tells her that they will instead tell the police the truth before they leave to get medical help for Tanya.

== Cast ==
- Elizabeth Anne Allen as Shelly Saltemeir
- Michael Harris as Carl Saltemeir
- Cedrick Terrell as Raymond
- Dana Daurey as Tanya Saltemeir
- Bonnie Burroughs as Ruby Saltemeir
