= Coming Up Roses (2011 film) =

- Directed by: Lisa Albright
- Written by: Lisa Albright; Christine Lazaridi
- Produced by: Adam Folk; Jonathan Mason
- Starring: Bernadette Peters; Rachel Brosnahan
- Cinematography: Ryan Samul
- Edited by: Ray Hubley
- Music by: Dominic Matar
- Production company: Bullet Pictures
- Distributed by: Dada Films
- Release dates: September 23, 2011 (Woodstock); November 9, 2012 (United States)
- Running time: 88 minutes
- Country: United States
- Language: English

Coming Up Roses is a 2011 American drama film directed by Lisa Albright and starring Bernadette Peters and Rachel Brosnahan.

== Cast ==
- Bernadette Peters as Diane
- Rachel Brosnahan as Alice
- Peter Friedman as Charles
- Reyna de Courcy as Cat
- Shannon Esper as Cherie
- Ann Dowd as Lynne
- Jayce Bartok as Jimmy

== Release ==
The film premiered at the Woodstock Film Festival on September 23, 2011. It was then released in limited theaters on November 9, 2012.

== Reception ==
The film has a 17% rating on Rotten Tomatoes.
