= Bernadette Peters =

American actress and singer (born 1948)

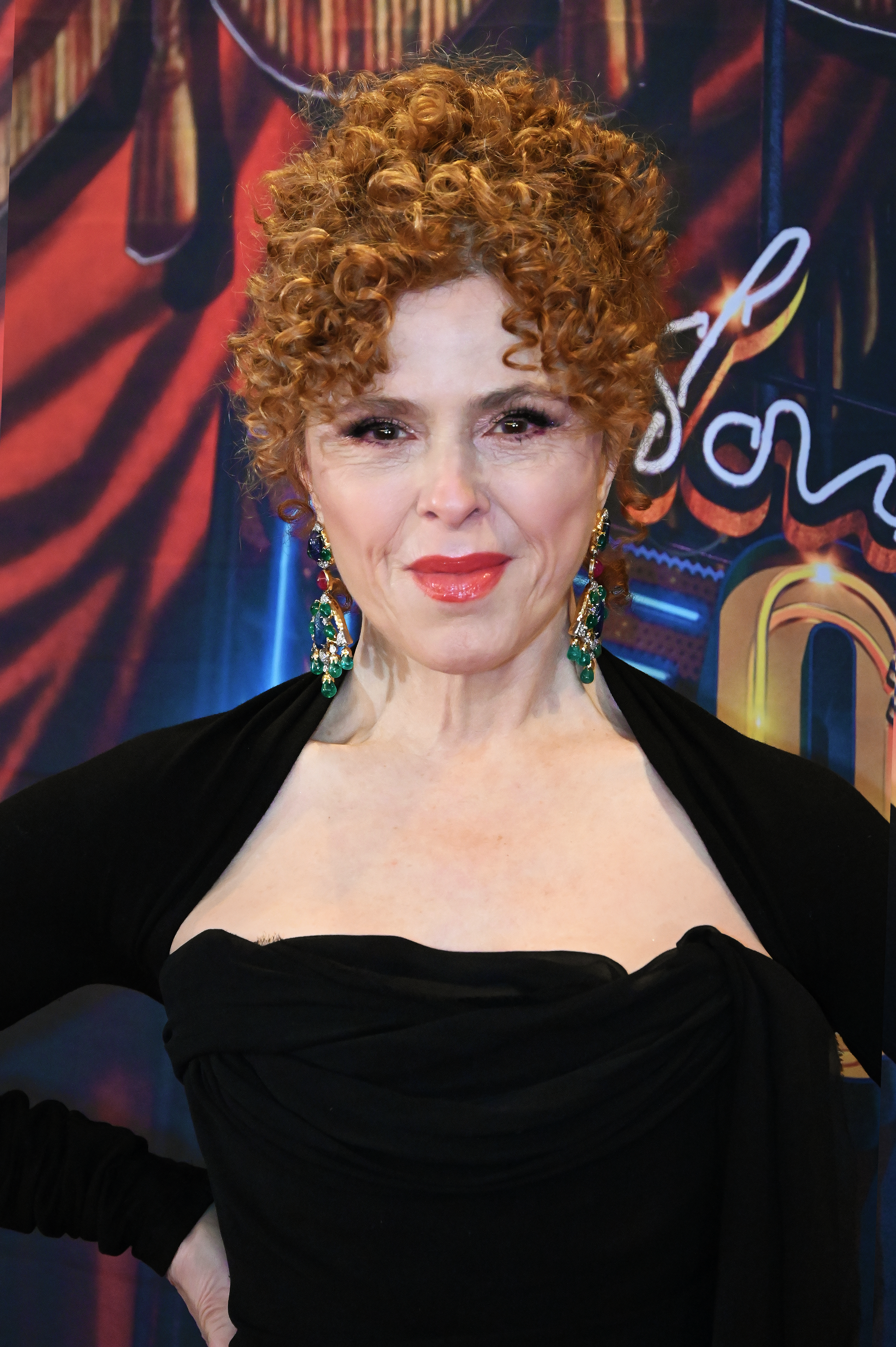
- Peters in 2025
- Born: Bernadette Lazzara; February 28, 1948 (age 78); New York City, U.S.
- Occupations: Actress; singer
- Years active: 1958–present
- Works: Full list
- Spouses: Michael Wittenberg (m. 1996; died 2005); Tom Sorce (m. 2024)
- Awards: Full list
- Website: officialbernadettepeters.com

Bernadette Peters (née Lazzara; born February 28, 1948) is an American actress and singer. Over a career spanning more than six decades, she has starred in musical theatre, television and film, performed in solo concerts and released recordings. She is a critically acclaimed Broadway performer, having received seven nominations for Tony Awards, winning two (plus an honorary award), and nine Drama Desk Award nominations, winning three. Four of the Broadway cast albums on which she has starred have won Grammy Awards.

According to a 1999 New York Times profile, Peters is "considered by many to be the premier interpreter" of the works of Stephen Sondheim. On Broadway, she created roles in the premieres of Sondheim's Sunday in the Park with George (1984) and Into the Woods (1987), and starred in revivals of his A Little Night Music and Follies. She created other Broadway roles in Mack and Mabel (1974) and Song and Dance (1985) and starred in Broadway revivals of The Goodbye Girl (1993), Annie Get Your Gun (1999), Gypsy (2003), and Hello, Dolly! (2018). She co-starred in the revue Stephen Sondheim's Old Friends both in the West End (2023) and on Broadway (2025). She has recorded six solo albums and many cast albums, and has performed regularly in solo concert acts.

Peters first performed on the stage as a child actress and then a teenager in the 1960s, and in film and television from the 1970s. She was praised for this early work and for appearances on, among other programs, The Muppet Show and The Carol Burnett Show, and for her roles in films including Silent Movie (1976), The Jerk (1979), Pennies from Heaven (1981, for which she won a Golden Globe Award), and Annie (1982). She has also acted in television shows such as Animaniacs (1993–1998), Ally McBeal (2001), Smash (2012–2013), Mozart in the Jungle (2014–2018), The Good Fight (2017–2018), Zoey's Extraordinary Playlist (2020–2021) and High Desert (2023).

== Early life and family ==
Peters was born on February 28, 1948, into an Italian-American family in Ozone Park in the New York City borough of Queens, the youngest of three children. Her mother, Marguerite (née Maltese), started her in show business by putting her on the television show Juvenile Jury at the age of three and a half. Her father, Peter Lazzara, drove a bread delivery truck. Her siblings are casting director Donna DeSeta and Joseph Lazzara. She appeared on the television shows Name That Tune and several times on The Horn and Hardart Children's Hour as a small child.

== Career ==
=== 1958–1974: Child actor ===
In January 1958, at age nine, she obtained her Actors Equity Card in the name Bernadette Peters to avoid ethnic typecasting, with the stage name taken from her father's first name. She made her professional stage debut the same month in This Is Goggle, a comedy directed by Otto Preminger that closed during out-of-town tryouts before reaching New York. She then appeared on NBC television as Anna Stieman in A Boy Called Ciske, a Kraft Mystery Theatre production, in May 1958, and in a vignette entitled "Miracle in the Orphanage", part of "The Christmas Tree", a Hallmark Hall of Fame production, in December 1958, with fellow child actor Richard Thomas and veteran actors Jessica Tandy and Margaret Hamilton. She first appeared on the New York stage at age 10 as Tessie in the New York City Center revival of The Most Happy Fella (1959). In her teen years, she attended Quintano's School for Young Professionals, a now-defunct private school.

At age 13, Peters appeared as one of the "Hollywood Blondes" and was an understudy for "Dainty June" in the second national tour of Gypsy. During this tour, Peters first met her long-time accompanist, conductor and arranger Marvin Laird, who was the assistant conductor for the tour. Laird recalled, "I heard her sing an odd phrase or two and thought, 'God that's a big voice out of that little girl'". The next summer, she played Dainty June in summer stock, and in 1962 she recorded her first single. In 1964, she played Liesl in The Sound of Music and Jenny in Riverwind in summer stock at the Mt. Gretna Playhouse (Pennsylvania), and Riverwind again at the Bucks County Playhouse in 1966. Upon graduation from high school, she started working steadily, appearing Off-Broadway in the musicals The Penny Friend (1966) and Curley McDimple (1967) and as a standby on Broadway in The Girl in the Freudian Slip (1967). She made her Broadway debut in Johnny No-Trump in 1967, and next appeared as George M. Cohan's sister Josie opposite Joel Grey in George M! (1968), winning the Theatre World Award.

Peters's performance as "Ruby" in the 1968 Off-Broadway production of Dames at Sea, a parody of 1930s musicals, brought her critical acclaim and her first Drama Desk Award. She had appeared in an earlier 1966 version of Dames at Sea at the Off-Off-Broadway performance club Caffe Cino. Peters had starring roles in her next Broadway vehicles—Gelsomina in the 1969 musical version of the Italian film of the same name, La Strada (for which she won good reviews but the show closed after one performance) and Hildy in a revival of On the Town (1971), for which she received her first Tony Award nomination. She played Mabel Normand in Mack and Mabel (1974), receiving another Tony nomination. Clive Barnes wrote: "With the splashy Mack & Mabel ... diminutive and contralto Bernadette Peters found herself as a major Broadway star." The Mack and Mabel cast album became popular among musical theatre fans. She moved to Los Angeles in the early 1970s to concentrate on television and film work.

=== 1975–1989: Rise to prominence ===
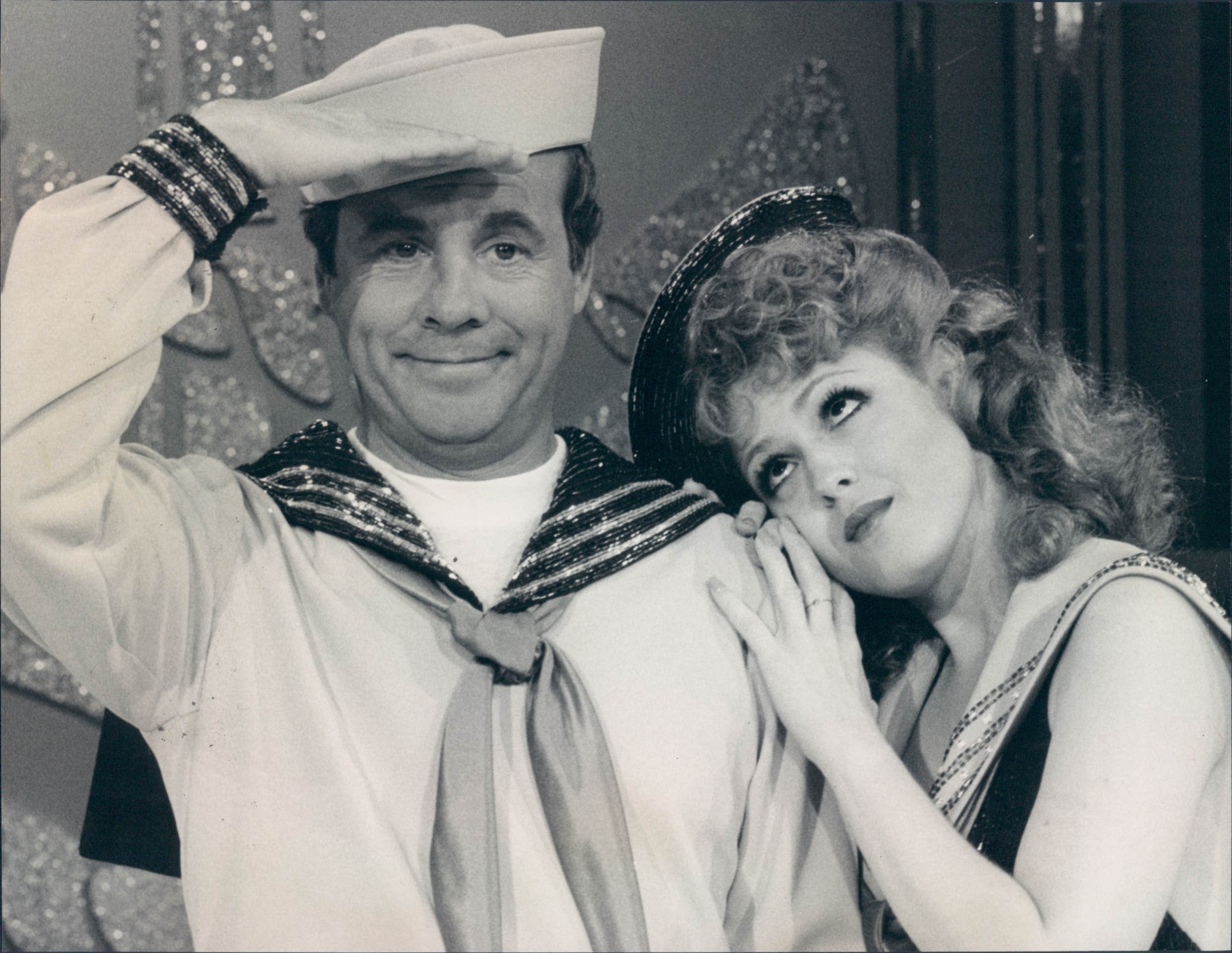
Peters on The Tim Conway Show, 1980

Peters has appeared in more than 40 feature films or television films beginning in 1973, including the 1976 Mel Brooks film Silent Movie for which she was nominated for a Golden Globe Award for Best Supporting Actress – Motion Picture. She co-starred in her own television series, All's Fair, with Richard Crenna in 1976–77. She played a young, liberal photographer, who becomes romantically involved with an older, conservative columnist. Although Peters was praised for her charismatic performance, the show ran for only one season. Peters was nominated for a Golden Globe award as Best TV Actress – Musical/Comedy. Peters starred opposite Steve Martin in The Jerk (1979) in a role that he wrote for her, and again in Pennies from Heaven (1981), for which she won the Golden Globe Award as Best Motion Picture Actress in a Comedy or Musical. In Pennies from Heaven, she played Eileen Everson, a schoolteacher turned prostitute. Of her performance in Pennies from Heaven, John DiLeo wrote that she "is not only poignant as you'd expect but has a surprising inner strength." Pauline Kael wrote in The New Yorker: "Peters is mysteriously right in every nuance."

Peters was nominated for Primetime Emmy Award for Outstanding Guest Actress in a Comedy Series on The Muppet Show (1977). On The Muppet Show, Peters sang the song "Just One Person" to Robin the Frog. She was one of the Muppets' guests when they hosted The Tonight Show in 1979, again singing "Just One Person" to Robin, and she appeared in other episodes with the Muppets. She performed and presented at the Academy Awards broadcasts in 1976, 1981, 1983, 1987 and 1994. Peters has been a presenter at the annual Tony Awards ceremony and also co-hosted the ceremony with Gregory Hines in 2002. She also hosted Saturday Night Live in November 1981. Peters has appeared on many TV variety shows, with stars such as Sonny and Cher and George Burns. She made 11 guest appearances on The Carol Burnett Show as well as appearing with Burnett in the 1972 made-for-television version of Once Upon a Mattress and the 1982 film Annie.

Peters in Pennies from Heaven, 1981

In 1982, Peters returned to the New York stage after an eight-year absence, in one of her few non-musical stage appearances, the Off-Broadway Manhattan Theatre Club production of the comedy-drama Sally and Marsha, for which she was nominated for a Drama Desk Award. She then returned to Broadway as Dot/Marie in the Stephen Sondheim–James Lapine musical Sunday in the Park with George in 1984, for which she received her third Tony Award nomination. The New York Times theater critic Frank Rich called her performance "radiant". She recorded the role for PBS in 1986, winning a 1987 ACE Award. Her next role was Emma in Andrew Lloyd Webber's Song and Dance on Broadway in 1985, winning her first Tony Award for Best Leading Actress in a Musical. Frank Rich wrote in an otherwise negative review of the show that Peters "has no peer in the musical theatre right now."

She then created the role of the Witch in Sondheim-Lapine's Into the Woods (1987). Peters is "considered by many to be the premier interpreter of [Sondheim's] work," according to writer Alex Witchel. Raymond Knapp wrote that Peters "achieved her definitive stardom" in Sunday in the Park With George and Into the Woods. Sondheim has said of Peters, "Like very few others, she sings and acts at the same time," he says. "Most performers act and then sing, act and then sing ... Bernadette is flawless as far as I'm concerned. I can't think of anything negative." She won the 1987 "CableACE Award" for her role as Dot in the television version of Sunday in the Park with George. In 1989 she starred in the James Ivory film Slaves of New York and in the Buddy Van Horn action comedy film Pink Cadillac (1989) alongside Clint Eastwood.

=== 1990s ===
In 1990 she appeared in Woody Allen's Alice (1990). The following year she acted as Marie D'Agoult in the James Lapine directed period drama film Impromptu (1991). Peters starred alongside Hugh Grant, Judy Davis, Emma Thompson, Mandy Patinkin, and Julian Sands. In 1997 she voiced Sophie in the animated musical film Anastasia (1997). Peters has also appeared in such television films as The Last Best Year (1990), Cinderella (1997; receiving a nomination for the "Golden Satellite Award" for her role), and as Circe in the 1997 miniseries The Odyssey (2001). Peters voiced Rita the stray cat in the "Rita and Runt" segments of the animated series Animaniacs in the 1990s. Peters, as Rita, sang both original songs written for the show and parodies of Broadway musical numbers.

Peters continued her association with Sondheim by appearing in a 1995 benefit concert of Anyone Can Whistle, playing the role of Fay Apple. Additionally, she appeared in several concerts featuring Sondheim's work, and performed at his 1993 Kennedy Center Honors ceremony.

She next starred in the musical adaptation of Neil Simon's The Goodbye Girl with music by Marvin Hamlisch (1993). Peters won her second Tony for Best Leading Actress in a Musical for her performance as Annie Oakley in the 1999 Broadway revival of Annie Get Your Gun. Among many glowing notices, critic Lloyd Rose of The Washington Post commented: "[Peters] banishes all thoughts of Ethel Merman about two bars into her first number, 'Doin' What Comes Natur'lly.' Partly this is because Merman's Annie was a hearty, boisterous gal, while Peters' plays an adorable, slightly goofy gamine. ... For anyone who cares about the American musical theatre, the chance to see Peters in this role is reason enough to see the show." Playbill went even further: "Arguably the most talented comedienne in the musical theatre today, Peters manages to extract a laugh from most every line she delivers." Peters has been nominated for the Tony Award seven times, winning twice, and has also received an honorary Tony Award. She has also been nominated for the Drama Desk Award nine times, winning three times, for Annie Get Your Gun, Song and Dance and Dames at Sea.

=== 2000s ===
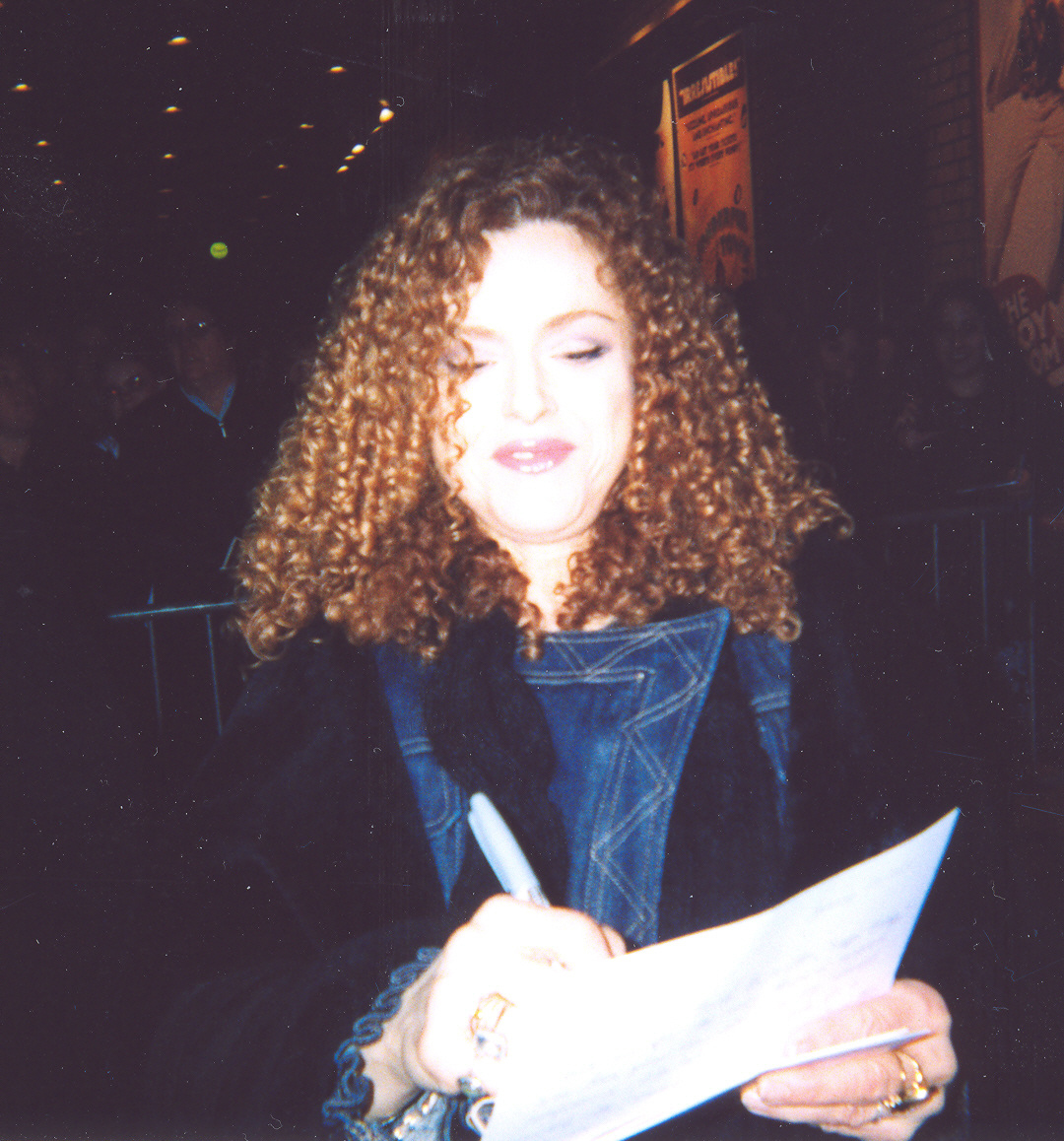
Peters after a performance of Gypsy in 2004

For her role in the Fox series Ally McBeal (2001), Peters received a nomination for the Primetime Emmy Award for Outstanding Guest Actress in a Comedy Series. Peters was also nominated for a 2003 Daytime Emmy Award, Outstanding Performer in a Children's Special, for her work in the 2002 television film Bobbie's Girl. She also performed at the Kennedy Center Honors ceremony for Burnett in 2003. Peters appeared on The Tonight Show Starring Johnny Carson and on the day-time talk show Live with Regis and Kelly, both as a co-host and a guest. She appeared on Inside the Actors Studio in November 2000, discussing her career and craft. Peters appeared with three generations of the Kirk Douglas family in the 2003 film It Runs in the Family, in which she played the wife of Michael Douglas's character. That same year she acted in Prince Charming (2003). Also in 2003, Peters starred as Rose in the Broadway revival of Gypsy, earning another Tony nomination. Ben Brantley in The New York Times wrote, "Working against type and expectation under the direction of Sam Mendes, Ms. Peters has created the most complex and compelling portrait of her long career, and she has done this in ways that deviate radically from the Merman blueprint."

In March 2005, she made a pilot for an ABC situation comedy series titled Adopted, co-starring with Christine Baranski, but it was not picked up. In May 2006, she appeared in the film Come le formiche (Wine and Kisses) with F. Murray Abraham, filmed in Italy, playing a rich American who becomes involved with an Italian family that owns a vineyard. The DVD was released in 2007 in Italy. In 2006, she participated in a reading of the Sondheim-Weidman musical Bounce. In 2007, she participated in a charity reading of the play Love Letters, with actor John Dossett. Peters appeared in the Lifetime television film Living Proof, which was first broadcast on October 18, 2008. She played the role of Barbara, an art teacher with breast cancer, who is initially reluctant to participate in the study for the cancer drug Herceptin. Andrew Gans of Playbill wrote, "Peters is able to choose from an expansive emotional palette to color the character, and her performance... is moving, humorous and ultimately spirit-raising".

Peters's television work also includes guest appearances on several television series. She appeared as the sharp-tongued sister of Karen Walker (Megan Mullally) on the penultimate episode of the NBC series Will & Grace, "Whatever Happened to Baby Gin?" (May 2006); as a defense attorney on the NBC series, Law & Order: Special Victims Unit (November 2006); as a judge on the ABC series Boston Legal (May 2007); and as an accident victim in Grey's Anatomy (September 2008). Of her role in Grey's Anatomy, TV Guide wrote: "Peters is especially fine as she confronts a life spinning out of control. I'd make her an early contender for a guest-actor Emmy nomination." In January, February and May 2009, she appeared in the ABC series Ugly Betty in five episodes as Jodie Papadakis, a magazine mogul running the YETI (Young Editors Training Initiative) program that Betty and Marc are in. Her appearance at the Adelaide Cabaret Festival in June 2009 was filmed and broadcast in Australia later that month.

=== 2010s ===
Peters starred in the Broadway revival of Sondheim's A Little Night Music (2010), succeeding Catherine Zeta-Jones in the role of Desirée Armfeldt. The New York Times reviewer wrote of her performance,

[F]or theater lovers there can be no greater current pleasure than to witness Bernadette Peters perform the show's signature number, "Send In the Clowns," with an emotional transparency and musical delicacy that turns this celebrated song into an occasion of transporting artistry. I'm not sure I've ever experienced with such palpable force – or such prominent goose bumps – the sense of being present at an indelible moment in the history of musical theatre.

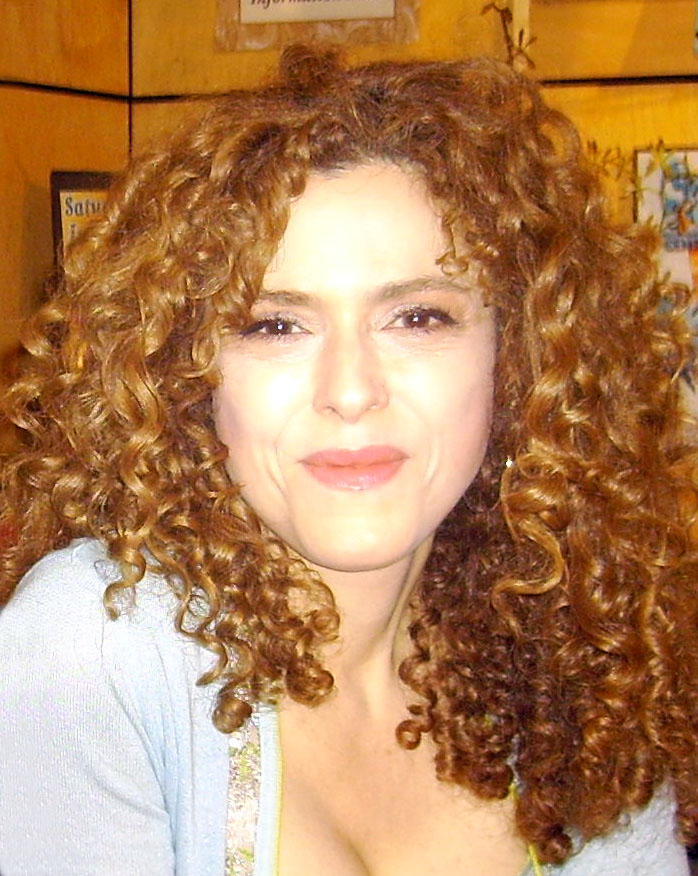
Peters in 2008

Peters's next stage appearance was in the role of Sally Durant Plummer in the Kennedy Center for the Performing Arts production of the Sondheim–Goldman musical Follies in 2011. One critic wrote: "Peters ... exquisitely captures the character's unfathomable sadness and longing. It's a star turn, for sure, but one that brings attention to itself because of its truthfulness. Not surprisingly, her rendition of 'Losing My Mind' is simply shattering." She reprised the role in the Broadway revival at the Marquis Theatre, later in 2011, and received a nomination for the Drama Desk Award, Outstanding Actress in a Musical. At the 66th Tony Awards in 2012, Peters was presented with the honorary Isabelle Stevenson Award for "making a substantial contribution of volunteered time and effort on behalf of one or more humanitarian, social service or charitable organizations, regardless of whether such organizations relate to the theatre", specifically for her work with Broadway Barks. In making the announcement for this award, the Tony official site noted "With a rich generosity of spirit, Bernadette Peters' devotion to charitable causes is perhaps only outweighed by her much fêted dedication to performing. ... Peters' efforts are held in the highest regard on Broadway and beyond." BC/EFA's Tom Viola said, "Bernadette's boundless compassion and generosity represent the best in all of us."

She starred in a 2012 film titled Coming Up Roses, playing a former musical comedy actress with two daughters. Peters first appeared in the NBC series Smash in the March 2012 episode "The Workshop", as Leigh Conroy, Ivy's mother, a retired Broadway star, who feels competitive because of her daughter's blossoming career. She visits the workshop and sings Everything's Coming Up Roses (from Gypsy) at the urging of the workshop cast. She also appeared in the season 1 finale, "Bombshell" (May 2012), to celebrate Ivy's presumed role as Marilyn, in "The Parents" episode (April 2013), where, as Leigh, she sings an original Marc Shaiman and Scott Wittman song, "Hang the Moon", and in the episodes "Opening Night" (April 2013) and "The Phenomenon" (May 2013). Peters starred in the Sondheim and Wynton Marsalis staged concert revue titled A Bed and a Chair: A New York Love Affair at New York City Center in 2013. This collaboration between Encores! and Jazz at Lincoln Center was directed by John Doyle, with jazzy arrangements of Sondheim's songs. Peters sang "Broadway Baby", "The Ladies Who Lunch", "Isn't He Something?", "I Remember" and "With So Little to Be Sure Of", among others. Jesse Green, in his review in New York Magazine's Vulture site, commented: "[W]hat a wrenching (and funny) actress Peters remains, not on top of her voice but through it." Brantley, in The New York Times wrote: "As a singer and actress, she just can't help being ardent, full-throated and sincere. She also reminds us here of her considerable and original comic gifts."

From 2014 to 2018, Peters played Gloria Windsor, the chairwoman of the orchestra board in Mozart in the Jungle, a web video series by Amazon Studios based on Blair Tindall's memoir of the same name. The show was picked up for a second and third season. She was a guest star in the 2014 Bravo television series Girlfriends' Guide to Divorce in the episode "Rule #21: Leave Childishness to Children". Peters played the recurring role of Lenore Rindell, a financial scammer, in the CBS television series The Good Fight, in 2017 and 2018. In 2020, she played Ms. Freesia in the series Katy Keene. She returned to Broadway in the title role of the 2017 revival of Hello, Dolly! at the Shubert Theatre. Succeeding Bette Midler, Peters began performances on January 20, 2018. Marilyn Stasio wrote in Variety: "This Dolly's personal style is to twinkle and charm people into getting her way. (Her 'So Long, Dearie' is an irresistible gem.) She also has the acting chops to moisten eyeballs when she entreats her late husband to bless her renouncement of widowhood and rejoin the human race in 'Before the Parade Passes By'." Peters played her final performance as Dolly on July 15, 2018.

=== 2020s ===
She next played Deb in Zoey's Extraordinary Playlist (2020–2021) and the television film Zoey's Extraordinary Christmas (2021) and was nominated for a Primetime Emmy Award in the role. Peters was also in the Apple TV+ series High Desert.

Peters made her West End debut alongside Lea Salonga in the tribute revue Stephen Sondheim's Old Friends, at the Gielgud Theatre from September 2023 to January 2024. The revue transferred to Broadway's Samuel J. Friedman Theatre in April 2025, again starring Peters and Salonga, following a pre-Broadway run at the Ahmanson Theatre in Los Angeles. She plays Serena Cherry in The Debut (2026).

== Recordings ==
Album cover from Bernadette Peters (painting by Vargas, 1980)

Peters has recorded six solo albums and several singles. Three of her albums have been nominated for the Grammy Award. Peters's 1980 single "Gee Whiz", remaking Carla Thomas' 1960 Memphis soul hit, reached the top forty on the U.S. Billboard pop singles charts. She has recorded most of the Broadway and off-Broadway musicals she has appeared in, and four of these cast albums have won Grammy Awards.

Peters's debut album in 1980 (an LP), titled Bernadette Peters contained 10 songs, including "If You Were the Only Boy", "Gee Whiz" (a Top 40 hit single), "Heartquake", "Should've Never Let Him Go", "Chico's Girl", "Pearl's a Singer", "Other Lady", "Only Wounded", "I Never Thought I'd Break" and "You'll Never Know". The original cover painting by Alberto Vargas was one of his last works, created at the age of 84. According to The New York Daily News, Peters "persuaded him to do one last 'Vargas Girls' portrait... She just went to his California retreat, asked him to do one more, he looked at her and said, 'You ARE a Vargas girl!'" She kept the original painting. The original title planned for the album was Decades. Rolling Stone wrote of her debut album:

Peters debuts on record as a first-rate pop torch singer: Melissa Manchester with soul, Bette Midler on pitch. Her album has already spawned the hit single "Gee Whiz," a laid-back, doo-wop version ... that makes Peters' piping, little-girl voice seem almost like a cutesy novelty. There are also a couple of Barry Mann and Cynthia Weil rock tunes in which she sounds slightly trashy and out of her depth. The Peter Allen songs on side two are really more her style. In fact, the whole second half of Bernadette Peters is just about perfect, from the star's semi-C&W rendition of Jerry Leiber and Mike Stoller's "Pearl's a Singer" to a wistful recap of Harry Warren and Mark Gordon's romantic "You'll Never Know." But the best cuts are in between. "Other Lady," written by Lesley Gore(!) with Ellen Weston, tackles an age-old problem with... devastating eloquence... and Peters delivers it with the proper brooding introspection. Allen's compositions, "Only Wounded" (co-written with Carole Bayer Sager) and the torchy "I Never Thought I'd Break" (co-written with Dean Pitchford), feature the finest singing on the LP...the unusual absence of airbrushing echo places heavy demands on the chanteuse's sultry soprano. That Bernadette Peters rises to the occasion makes her performance that much more impressive.

Her next solo album, Now Playing (1981), featured songs by Jerry Leiber and Mike Stoller, Carole Bayer Sager and Marvin Hamlisch, and Stephen Sondheim (for example, "Broadway Baby"). Bernadette Peters was re-released on CD in 1992 as Bernadette, with the 1980 Vargas cover art, and included some of the songs from Now Playing. In 1996, she was nominated for a Grammy Award for her best-selling album, I'll Be Your Baby Tonight, which includes popular songs by John Lennon, Paul McCartney, Lyle Lovett, Hank Williams, Sam Cooke and Billy Joel, as well as Broadway classics by Leonard Bernstein and Rodgers and Hammerstein. The live recording of her 1996 Carnegie Hall concert, Sondheim, Etc. – Bernadette Peters Live at Carnegie Hall, also was nominated for a Grammy Award.

Peters's next studio album, in 2002, Bernadette Peters Loves Rodgers and Hammerstein, consisted entirely of Rodgers and Hammerstein songs, including two that she often sings in her concerts, "Some Enchanted Evening" and "There Is Nothin' Like a Dame". This album, which reached position 14 on the Billboard "Top Internet Albums" chart, was her third album in a row nominated for a Grammy Award. It formed the basis of her Radio City Music Hall solo concert debut in June 2002. Her last solo album, titled Sondheim Etc., Etc. Live at Carnegie Hall: The Rest of It, was released in 2005. It consists of all of the songs (and patter) from her 1996 Carnegie Hall concert that were not included in the earlier recording. Additionally, Peters has recorded songs on other albums, such as "Dublin Lady" on John Whelan's Flirting with the Edge (Narada, 1998). On the Mandy Patinkin Dress Casual 1990 album, Patinkin and Peters recorded the songs from Stephen Sondheim's 1966 television play, Evening Primrose. On the tribute album Born to the Breed: A Tribute to Judy Collins Peters sings "Trust Your Heart".

In The New York Times review of the 1986 Broadway cast recording of Song and Dance (titled Bernadette Peters in Andrew Lloyd Webber's 'Song & Dance'), Stephen Holden opined the recording was:

[A] personal triumph for a singer and actress who is rapidly establishing herself as the first lady of the Broadway musical. Performing material whose music borders on kitsch and whose lyrics and story suggest a verbose soap opera, Miss Peters nevertheless projects an astounding emotional generosity and conviction. Almost singlehandedly she turns the inconsequential erotic misadventures of Emma ... into a touching romantic fable about love and its defenses and the loss of innocence. ... Miss Peters has always oozed a cuddlesome Shirley Temple-like sweetness and vulnerability. This quality, which used to seem more like an adorable child-star affectation than a deep-seated trait, has proved to be an essential ingredient of Miss Peters's personality. A delivery that once seemed coy and cutesy has deepened and ripened into an honesty and compassion that pour out in singing that is childlike but also resilient.

In 2003, Andrew Gans wrote in Playbill.com of Peters's recording sessions for Gypsy: "What is it about her voice that is so moving? Part womanly and part girlish, it is a powerful instrument, not only in volume (though that is impressive) but in the wealth of emotion it is able to convey. ... her voice – that mix of husky, sweet, rounded, vibrato-filled tones – induces a response that spans the emotional scale." Of her "Rose's Turn", Gans wrote: "...her rendition of this song may be the highlight of a career already filled with many highlights: She has taken a song that has been delivered incredibly by others and brought it to a new level." Of her performance on the recording of Follies (2011), Steven Suskin wrote in Playbill.com: "This is a fine Sally, the sort of Sally you'd expect to get from an actress like – well, Bernadette Peters. The performance on the CD is compelling; either this is simply the magic of the recording studio or Peters has changed what she does and how she does it."

== Concert performances ==
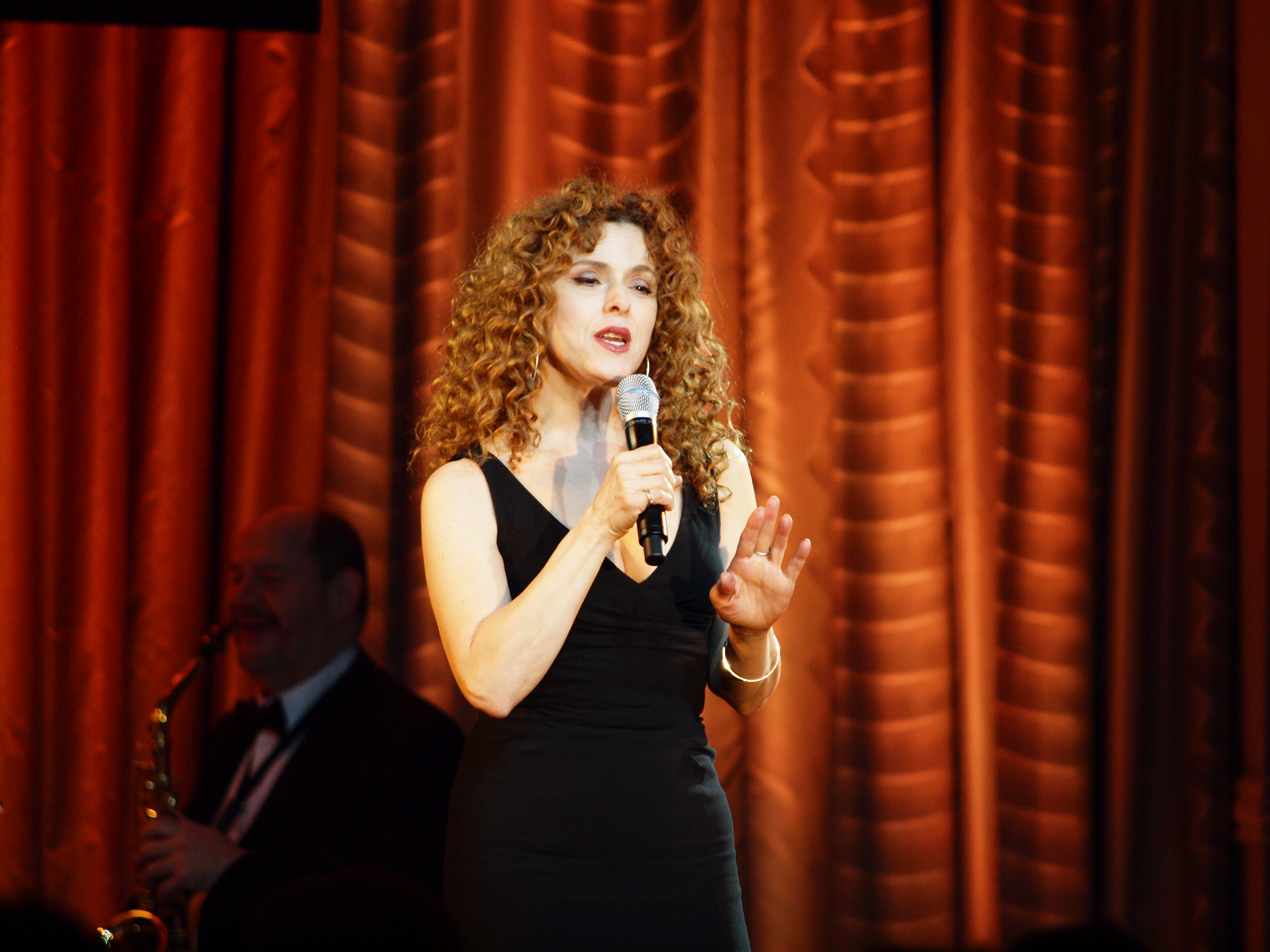
Peters at the Drama League in 2010

Peters has been performing her solo concert in the United States and Canada for many years. She made her solo concert debut at Carnegie Hall in New York City in 1996, devoting the second half to the work of Stephen Sondheim. She performed a similar concert in London in 1999, which was recorded and released on VHS, and also aired on US public television stations. She continues to perform her solo concert at venues around the U.S., such as the Adrienne Arsht Center for the Performing Arts in Miami, and with symphony orchestras such as the Pittsburgh Symphony Orchestra, the Dallas Symphony, and the Los Angeles Philharmonic at Walt Disney Hall.

In a review of her 2002 Radio City Music Hall concert, Stephen Holden of The New York Times described Peters as "the peaches-and-cream embodiment of an ageless storybook princess... inside a giant soap bubble floating toward heaven. A belief in the power of the dreams behind Rodgers and Hammerstein's songs, if not in their reality, was possible." Peters made her solo concert debut at Lincoln Center in New York City in 2006. Holden, reviewing this concert, noted, "Even while swiveling across the stage of Avery Fisher Hall like a voluptuous Botticelli Venus in Bob Mackie spangles... she radiated a preternatural innocence.... For the eternal child in all of us, she evokes a surrogate childhood playmate". Peters was the headliner at the 2009 Adelaide Cabaret Festival in Adelaide, Australia. The Sunday Mail wrote that Peters showed "the verve, vigour and voice of someone half her age."

Peters's concert performances often benefit arts organizations or help them to mark special occasions, such as her performance on an overnight cruise on the Seabourn Odyssey in a benefit for the Adrienne Arsht Center for the Performing Arts in Miami in 2009. She was one of the performers to help celebrate the center's grand opening in 2006. She headlined The Alliance of The Arts Black Tie Anniversary Gala at Thousand Oaks Civic Arts Plaza in Thousand Oaks, California, on November 21, 2009. She had helped to celebrate the opening of the Arts Plaza with concerts fifteen years earlier. In 2015, Peters performed in the concert Sinatra: Voice for a Century at Lincoln Center, a fundraiser for the new David Geffen Hall in celebration of Frank Sinatra's 100th birthday. She sang "It Never Entered My Mind". It was hosted by Seth MacFarlane and featured the New York Philharmonic Orchestra, Sting, Billy Porter, Sutton Foster and Fantasia Barrino. PBS plans to broadcast it as part of its "Live from Lincoln Center" series in December 2015.

Since 2013, she has been touring intermittently with her cabaret act, An Evening with Bernadette Peters, and a concert series, "Bernadette Peters in Concert". In April 2014, she gave concert performances in Australia. The reviewer for The Sydney Morning Herald wrote: "Perhaps it is a matter of personality as much as voice: a natural warmth and an instinct for never exaggerating the emotional content of a song. Whatever the case, it is easy to see and hear why, for 30 years, Bernadette Peters has probably been musical theatre's finest performer. ... She even breathed new life into 'Send In the Clowns'. ... Rather than make it emotionally swollen (as so many do), Peters contracted it, delicately squeezing out its essence like toothpaste from a near-empty tube." She gave concerts in June 2016 in the UK at the Royal Festival Hall, Manchester Opera House and Edinburgh Playhouse. In 2022, she participated in Stephen Sondheim's Old Friends, a Cameron Mackintosh-produced tribute concert, May 3, 2022, at the Sondheim Theatre, London.

== Children's books ==
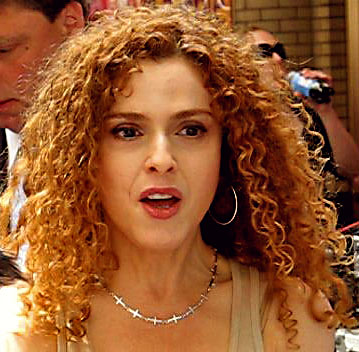
Peters at Broadway Barks, 2006

Peters sings four songs on the CD accompanying a 2005 children's picture book Dewey Doo-it Helps Owlie Fly Again, the proceeds of which benefit the Christopher Reeve Foundation. Her co-star from Sunday in the Park with George, Mandy Patinkin, also sings on the CD.

To support Broadway Barks, the animal adoption charity that she co-founded with Mary Tyler Moore, Peters has written three children's books, illustrated by Liz Murphy. The first is about a scrappy dog, named after her dog Kramer, and the pleasure of adopting a pet. Titled Broadway Barks, the book is published by Blue Apple Books (2008). Peters wrote the words and music to a lullaby, titled "Kramer's Song", which is included on a CD in the book. The book reached No. 5 on The New York Times Children's Best Sellers: Picture Books list for the week of June 8, 2008.

Her second children's book is the story of a pit bull, named after Peters's dog Stella. The character would rather be a pig ballerina, but she learns to accept herself. Titled Stella is a Star, the book includes a CD with an original song written and performed by Peters and was released in April 2010 by Blue Apple Books. According to Publishers Weekly, "Turning the pages to Peters' spirited narration, which is provided in an accompanying CD, makes for a more rewarding reading experience. The story and disc end with a sneakily affecting self-esteem anthem, which, like the familiar tale itself, is buoyed by the author's lovely vocals." Peters introduced the book at a reading and signing where she also sang part of the song, at the Los Angeles Times Festival of Books, Los Angeles, California, on April 24, 2010.

The third book, released in 2015, titled Stella and Charlie Friends Forever, is about her rescue dog Charlie joining her household, and how Charlie got along with her older dog, Stella.

== Activism and charity work ==
Broadway Barks

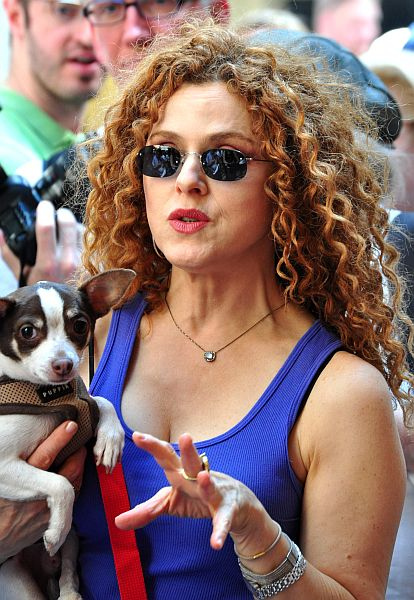
Peters at 13th Annual Broadway Barks, 2011

In 1999, Peters and Mary Tyler Moore co-founded Broadway Barks, an annual animal adopt-a-thon. Each July, Peters hosts the Broadway Barks event in New York City. Peters held a concert, "A Special Concert for Broadway Barks Because Broadway Cares", at the Minskoff Theatre, New York City, on November 9, 2009, as a benefit for both Broadway Barks and Broadway Cares/Equity Fights AIDS. The concert raised an estimated $615,000 for the two charities. Also in support of Broadway Barks, Peters has appeared on the daytime talk show Live With Regis and Kelly.

In 2018, Peters received the Brooke Astor Award from the Animal Medical Center for her lifelong commitment to animal welfare, including the "over 2,000 adoptions" to date at Broadway Barks events. In 2022, Broadway Barks held in its first in-person animal adoption event since the COVID-19 pandemic began, with many Broadway stars in attendance and many shelter organizations participating. Activists protesting against the Humane Society of New York, one of the shelter organizations represented at the event, briefly interrupted Peters's speech there.

Other

Peters serves on the board of trustees of Broadway Cares/Equity Fights AIDS and participates in that organization's events, such as the annual Broadway Flea Market and Grand Auction, and the "Gypsy of the Year" competition. She is also a member of the board of directors of Standing Tall, a non-profit educational program offering an innovative program for children with multiple disabilities, based in New York City. Her late husband was the Director and Treasurer of Standing Tall. The 1995 benefit concert Anyone Can Whistle and Peters's "Carnegie Hall" 1996 concert were benefits for the Gay Men's Health Crisis.

In 2007, Peters helped the Broadway community celebrate the end of the stagehand strike in a "Broadway's Back" concert at the Marquis Theatre. In 2008, she was one of the participants in a fund-raiser for the Westport Country Playhouse, and in the opening ceremony and dedication of the renovated TKTS discount ticket booth in Times Square. That year, she also presented New York City Mayor Michael Bloomberg with the Humanitarian Award at the Breast Cancer Research Foundation awards. On March 8, 2009, she helped celebrate the last birthday of Senator Ted Kennedy (singing "There Is Nothin' Like a Dame") in a private concert and ceremony held at the Kennedy Center, hosted by Bill Cosby, with many senators, representatives, and President Barack and First Lady Michelle Obama in attendance. On November 19, 2009, she helped to celebrate the opening of The David Rubenstein Atrium at Lincoln Center.

On February 8, 2010, Peters was one of the many to honor Angela Lansbury at the annual Drama League of New York benefit, singing "Not While I'm Around". In March 2010, Peters helped Stephen Sondheim celebrate his 80th birthday in the Roundabout Theatre Company "Sondheim 80" benefit. She was one of the Honorary Chairs. She had been part of the Roundabout Theatre's Sondheim gala for his 75th birthday. In 2012, Peters became a Patron of The Stephen Sondheim Society. She performed at the Olivier Awards ceremony in 2014, singing the song "Losing My Mind". A review in The Arts Desk read: "The tradition of bringing over a Broadway baby or two ... presumably explained a late appearance by a still-luminous Bernadette Peters, who reached the very high note at the end of 'Losing My Mind' often not attempted by interpreters of that particular Sondheim song."

== Personal life ==
Peters and Steve Martin began a romantic relationship in 1977 that lasted approximately four years. By 1981, her popularity led to her appearing on the cover and in a non-nude spread in the December 1981 issue of Playboy Magazine, in which she posed in lingerie designed by Bob Mackie.

Peters married investment adviser Michael Wittenberg on July 20, 1996, at the Millbrook, New York, home of long-time friend Mary Tyler Moore. Wittenberg died at age 43 on September 26, 2005, in a helicopter crash in Montenegro while on a business trip. Peters married sound designer Tom Sorce in 2024.

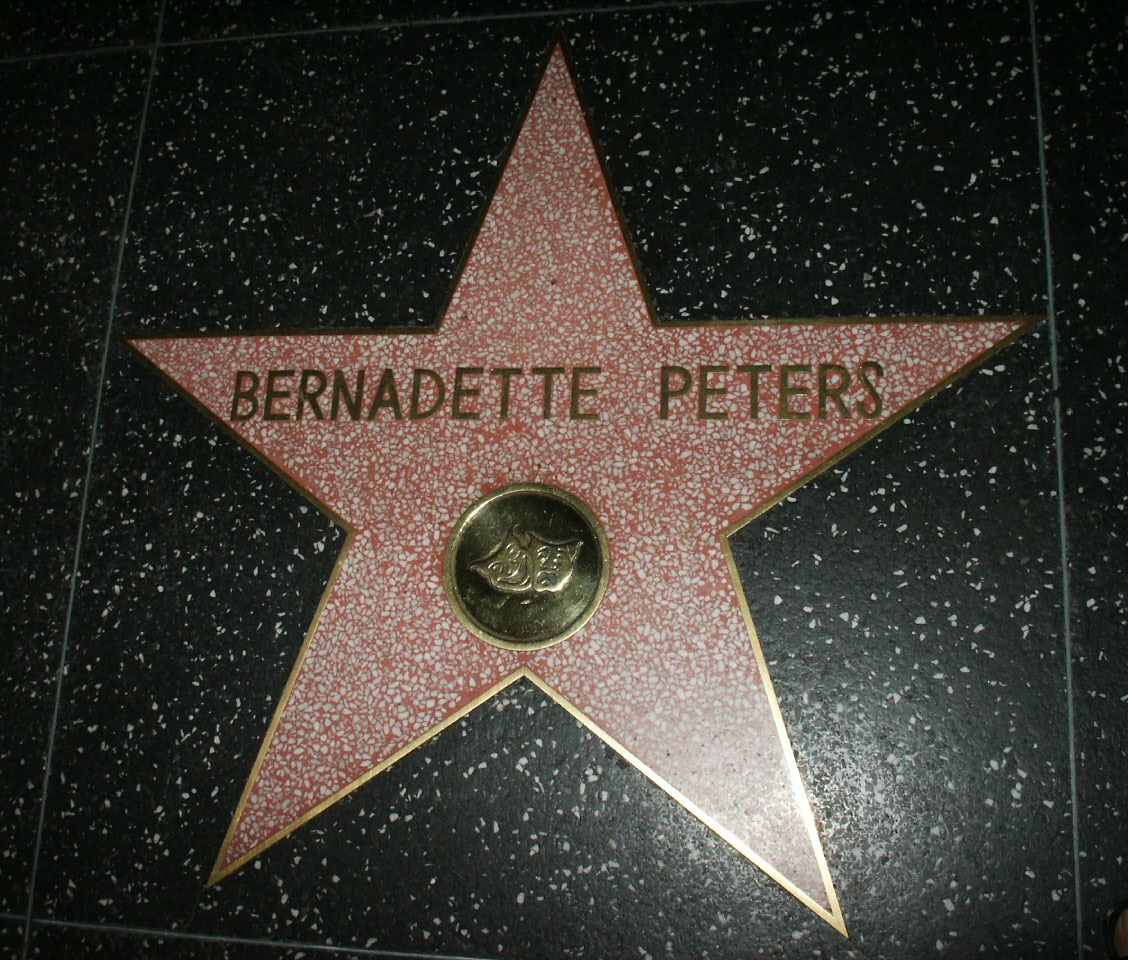
Peters's Star on the Hollywood Walk of Fame

Peters has a mixed-breed dog named Charlie. She has adopted all of her dogs from shelters.

== Acting credits and accolades ==
Peters' accolades include two Tony Awards, as well as the Isabelle Stevenson Award in 2012, three Drama Desk Awards, and a Golden Globe Award. She has also been nominated for three Primetime Emmy Awards and four Grammy Awards

She has received many honorary awards, including a star on the Hollywood Walk of Fame in 1987. She was named the Hasty Pudding Woman of the Year in 1987. Other honors include the Sarah Siddons Award for outstanding performance in a Chicago theatrical production (1994 for The Goodbye Girl); the American Theatre Hall of Fame at the Gershwin Theatre in New York City (1996), as the youngest person so honored; The Actors' Fund Artistic Achievement Medal (1999); an honorary doctorate from Hofstra University (2002); the Hollywood Bowl Hall of Fame in 2002 and the National Dance Institute 2009 Artistic Honoree. She was the recipient of the Sondheim Award, presented by the Signature Theatre in 2011.

In 2012, New Dramatists, an organization that supports beginning playwrights, presented Peters with their Lifetime Achievement Award, stating: "She has brought a new sound into the theatre and continues to do so, in surprising and miraculous ways. By some sleight of magic, her singularity always manages to bring out the best and richest in the work of her composers and writers." In 2013, the Drama League gave Peters its Special Award of Distinguished Achievement in Musical Theatre Award for "her contribution to the musical theatre." Peters was the Centennial Honoree at the Drama League Centennial Gala in 2015. A musical tribute was presented by many of Peters's costars over the years, including the original and current casts of Dames at Sea. The League said that Peters "exemplifies the absolute best of what American musical theatre can be."

She received the 2016 John Willis Award for Lifetime Achievement in the Theatre, presented at the Theatre World Awards on May 23, 2016. She was the honoree at the Manhattan Theatre Club 2018 Fall Benefit in November 2018. She is the 2019 recipient of the Prince Rainier III Award "for her outstanding artistry and exemplary philanthropic give-back." In 2024, Peters received the Lifetime Achievement Award at the Chita Rivera Awards.
