= Sally and Marsha =

Sally and Marsha is a comedy-drama, written by Sybille Pearson and directed by Lynne Meadow. It premiered Off-Broadway in 1982.

== Productions ==
Pearson was a graduate student at City College, and the play was read there by Jill Eikenberry and Pamela Reed in May 1980. The play was developed by the Yale Repertory Theatre and first produced in a staged reading at the O'Neill Theater Center, Waterford, Connecticut in 1980. The play was then produced at the Yale Winterfest in 1981, with Francis Conroy as Sally and Robin Bartlett as Marsha. Of the 1981 Winterfest production, the New York Times wrote that this was a play "of promise." "The play occasionally dips into archness and ends on a predictable note, but, as written from a woman's point of view, it has some enlivening and, for men, some disheartening comments on male-female, husband-wife relations...offers two choice, contrasting roles."

Sally and Marsha premiered on February 9, 1982, at the Off-Broadway Manhattan Theatre Club Stage 73 and ran for 56 performances. It starred Bernadette Peters as Sally and Christine Baranski as Marsha. According to The New York Times, "If the reviews are good, Paramount [Pictures] and Lester Osterman will move the play to Broadway."

This production marked the return of Bernadette Peters to the New York stage after eight years, when she joined the production four days before rehearsal.

== Plot ==
Sally, a housewife from South Dakota, moves into an apartment in New York City. She is an unsophisticated young mother with two small children, whose husband travels. She meets her neighbor, Marsha, whose husband is a resident in orthopedics. Marsha is a cynical and neurotic native New Yorker. Throughout the course of the time they spend together, the women discuss their respective views on life. Although outwardly different, they come to be supportive of each other.

== Responses ==
New York Times theatre critic Frank Rich wrote: "Every once in a while, her [Pearson] play spills beyond its rigid formula to give us honest, even touching glimpses of its heroines' lives....Sally is the perfect Peters role - an indomitable waif adrift in the big city."

John Simon wrote in New York Magazine that " 'Sally and Marsha' feels like a memory play...It is almost as if Sybille Pearson, the fledgling playwright, had been given a set of theatrical building blocks used to death and asked to put them together in a way to coax new life out of them. Impossible, alas; but Miss Pearson does give us a handful of funny lines, a thimbleful of touching moments, and a tiny peephole on what may become a valid theatrical career. Bernadette Peters, having played some such Sally all her life, invests her part with enormous conviction and warmth, and incisiveness; Christine Baranski...conjures up moments that seem newly invented."
