= Joshua Harmon =

Joshua Harmon may refer to:

- Joshua Harmon (poet) (born 1971), American poet, novelist, short story writer, and essayist
- Joshua Harmon (playwright) (born 1983), New York City-based playwright
