= Bobbie's Girl =

2002 Irish television film

- VHS cover
- Genre: Drama; Romance
- Written by: Samuel Bernstein
- Directed by: Jeremy Kagan
- Starring: Bernadette Peters; Rachel Ward; Jonathan Silverman; Thomas Sangster
- Music by: Bruce Broughton
- Country of origin: United States
- Original language: English

Production
- Executive producers: Spencer Proffer; John Davis
- Producers: Ronald Shore; James Flynn; Howard W. Koch; Morgan O'Sullivan
- Cinematography: Ciarán Tanham
- Editor: Michael Economou
- Running time: 95 minutes
- Production companies: Babyhead Productions; Jericho Entertainment; Morling Manor Media; Paramount Television

Original release
- Network: Showtime
- Release: 9 June 2002

Bobbie's Girl is a 2002 Irish comedy-drama television film directed by Jeremy Kagan and starring Bernadette Peters, Rachel Ward, Jonathan Silverman, and Thomas Sangster. The plot is about two women leading a comfortable, quiet life running a pub in Dublin who are suddenly confronted with a series of health and family crises.

== Plot ==
Bobbie Langham (Rachel Ward) and Bailey Lewis (Bernadette Peters) are life partners who own and run "The Two Sisters", a pub in the seaside village of Bray, near Dublin, Ireland, aided by Bailey's brother, David Lewis (Jonathan Silverman). Bobbie discovers that she has breast cancer, and is determined to deal with the crisis on her own. Meanwhile, the parents of Bobbie's 10-year-old nephew Alan Langham (Thomas Sangster) have been killed, and Bailey talks a reluctant Bobbie into taking him in. Bobbie and Bailey are opposites. Bobbie is cool, quiet, reserved and practical. Bailey is an American, warm, outgoing and eccentric, and a former actress. As Bobbie undergoes treatment for her illness she finally agrees to accept Bailey's help. In turn, Bailey takes over the management of the pub and takes care of Bobbie, growing more responsible.

In the end, Bobbie learns to express her love for Alan and accepts him into the extended "family", much to Bailey's delight. A "wedding-commitment" ceremony between Bobbie and Bailey, attended by family and friends, solidifies the women's commitment to each other.

== Cast ==
- Rachel Ward as Roberta 'Bobbie' Langham
- Bernadette Peters as Bailey
- Jonathan Silverman as David
- Thomas Sangster as Alan

== Production ==
Bobbie's Girl was filmed in Bray, County Wicklow, Ireland. The film reunites Bernadette Peters with director Jeremy Kagan, who directed her in the Faerie Tale Theatre TV movie Sleeping Beauty. That made-for-television film was initially broadcast on the Showtime network on 9 June 2002.

== Reception ==
The Gannett News Service review noted that the first part of the film "is truly wonderful. Even when the story becomes contrived, we'll forgive it instantly." It is "skillfully written..and directed" and "Peters' character, in particular, is warm, ditzy and delightful." The CNN.com reviewer wrote that the "story is as sketchy and unconvincing as Bailey's theatrical resume." The Grand Rapids Press reviewer wrote that it is a "charming tale of two women who run a pub", and that "Peters is her usual eccentric, curly-haired self. And Ward, who could be the U.K. twin of "West Wing's" Allison Janney, is letter perfect as the deep-voiced, rather severe Bobbie."

The Daily Variety reviewer wrote that the movie is "all character and situation and no plot", and that "Kagan never quite finds the pixilated sensibility the work seems to need, while writer Samuel Bernstein strains for a climax. The one thing "Bobbie's Girl" does have going for its subdued treatment of the lesbian relationship --- these characters don't need to be lesbians for any plot point, they just are." The Houston Chronicle noted this is "An Irish co-production, Bobbie's Girl was filmed in Ireland, a fine and proper setting for the whimsical free-spiritedness it aims to project." The Los Angeles Times reviewer wrote that the film was "Improbable yet oddly charming", with a style that hovers "somewhere between fairy tale and quirky art-house attraction."

== Awards and nominations ==
- Daytime Emmy Awards, Outstanding Performer in a Children's Special—Bernadette Peters (nominated)
- GLAAD Media Award, Outstanding Television Movie (nominated)

== See also ==
- List of television shows with LGBT characters
