= The Goodbye Girl (musical) =

- Original cast recording
- Music: Marvin Hamlisch
- Lyrics: David Zippel
- Book: Neil Simon
- Basis: The Goodbye Girl by Neil Simon
- Productions: 1993 Broadway; 1997 West End

The Goodbye Girl is a musical with a book by Neil Simon, lyrics by David Zippel, and music by Marvin Hamlisch, based on Simon's original screenplay for the 1977 film of the same name.

== Production history ==
=== Out-of-town tryouts ===
The Goodbye Girl opened in out-of-town tryouts at the Shubert Theatre in Chicago, from December 29, 1992 to January 30, 1993. The director, Gene Saks, was fired during the Chicago tryouts and replaced by Michael Kidd. During the run, producers created a new opening song for Bernadette Peters as Paula and Tammy Minoff as her daughter Lucy. "An exuberant song about their hoped-for move to California from New York City, it's meant to help Paula lighten up; in the first act, she has been perceived as a drip." Ticket sales were "brisk" for the Chicago run and the musical had a $10 million advance for Broadway.

=== Broadway ===
The musical, directed by Michael Kidd and choreographed by Graciela Daniele, opened on Broadway at the Marquis Theatre on March 4, 1993 and closed on August 15, 1993, after 188 performances and 23 previews. The opening cast included Bernadette Peters as Paula McFadden and Martin Short as Elliot Garfield, with Carol Woods as Mrs. Crosby, Susann Fletcher as Donna Douglas, Tammy Minoff as Lucy, Lisa Molina as Melanie and Erin Torpey as Cynthia. This musical marked Martin Short's Broadway debut.

=== Illinois ===
The musical was produced at the Marriott Theatre, Lincolnshire, Illinois, in February through April 1994. This version featured some modifications by lyricist David Zippel, who also co-directed the production. This represents the version preferred by the authors and is currently licensed by the licensing agent, MTI.

=== London ===
In 1995, British actor and comedian Gary Wilmot performed "My Rules" in his BBC One musical theatre series Showstoppers. He subsequently persuaded producer Paul Elliott to mount the show in London. After several previews, a revised version (with new lyrics by Don Black) opened on April 17, 1997 at the Albery Theatre in the West End, and closed on June 28, 1997. It starred Gary Wilmot and Ann Crumb. The new lyrics in this production were not well received. The production, directed by Rob Bettinson and choreographed by Tudor Davies, also featured Angela Avrili, Carol Ball, Cliff Brayshaw, Kyle Dadd, Steve Elias, Lucy Evans, Josefina Gabrielle, Adrian Goodfellow, Rachel Harris, Nicola Hughes, Michael Mears, Hayley Newton, Richard Pettyfer, Mary Savva, Wesley James Smith, Mason Taylor, Dina Tree, Jodie Lee Wilde and Shezwae Powell.

=== UK Tour ===
Wilmot subsequently toured the UK in 1997 and 1998 opposite Marti Webb. Sophie McShera alternated with Hannah Chick in the role of Lucy and Hope Augustus played the landlady. Other roles were played by Cherelle Binns, Cliff Brayshaw, Lisa Christoforou, Kyle Dadd, Steve Elias, Andrea Francis, Peter Grayer, Grant Neal, Darvina Plante, Mary Savva, Garry Stevens, Portia Singleton, Jenny-Anne Topham, and Katie Verner.

== Plot ==
Egotistical actor Elliot Garfield sublets a friend's Manhattan apartment only to discover it is still occupied by his friend's ex-girlfriend Paula, a former dancer, and her precocious pre-teen daughter Lucy. Initially suspicious and antagonistic, Elliot and Paula arrive at an uneasy truce. Paula, fed up with being hurt by boyfriend-actors, rashly vows never to become involved again ("No More"), while Elliot sets down the rules for the living arrangements ("My Rules/Elliot Garfield Grant"). Paula decides to return to work as a dancer, but during dance class finds it difficult ("A Beat Behind").

While attempting to cohabit as peacefully as possible, despite their differences of opinion and temperament, Elliot and Paula find themselves attracted to each other ("Paula (An Improvised Love Song)"). Although Elliot finds a job out-of-town, Paula realizes that this is the true love she has been seeking, and they reach a happy ending ("What a Guy").

== Recordings ==
Original cast recordings for both the Broadway and West End productions have been released. In his review of the London cast recording, Ken Mandelbaum noted that "The London Goodbye Girl is perhaps the sharpest example to date of an unnecessary revision. The skimpier new score isn't bad, but in no way does it improve upon what was there (the loss of all three of Peters' solos is particularly inexplicable)."

== Historical casting ==
Character	1993 Broadway cast	1994 Chicago cast	1997 West End cast	2023 Off-Broadway cast
Paula McFadden	Bernadette Peters	Kathy Santen	Ann Crumb	Sierra Boggess
Elliot Garfield	Martin Short	James Fitzgerald	Gary Wilmot	Santino Fontana
Lucy McFadden	Tammy Minoff	Jessie Ann Fisher	Dina Tree	Lena Josephine Marano
Mrs. Crosby	Carol Woods	Felicia P. Fields	Shezwae Powell	Debra Thais Evans

== Songs ==
=== Original Broadway Production ===
Act I

- "This Is as Good as It Gets" – Paula and Lucy
- "No More" – Paula
- "A Beat Behind" – Paula, Billy and Ensemble
- "This Is as Good as It Gets (Reprise)" – Lucy, Melanie and Cynthia
- "My Rules" – Elliot and Paula
- "Good News, Bad News" – Elliot, Paula and Lucy
- "Footsteps" – Paula and Lucy
- "How Can I Win?" – Paula
- "Richard Interred" – Elliot, Paula, Lucy, Mark, Mrs. Crosby, Donna and Ensemble

Act II

- "How Can I Win? (Reprise)" – Paula
- "Good News, Bad News (Reprise)" – Elliot
- "Too Good to Be Bad" – Paula, Donna and Jenna
- "2 Good 2 Be Bad" – Mrs. Crosby
- "Who Would've Thought?" – Paula, Elliot, Lucy, Melanie and Cynthia
- "Paula (An Improvised Love Song)" – Elliot and Paula
- "Who Would've Thought? (Reprise)" – Lucy, Melanie and Cynthia
- "I Think I Can Play This Part" – Elliot
- "Jump for Joy" – Paula and Ensemble
- "What a Guy" – Paula
- "Finale" – Paula, Elliot and Lucy

=== Original London Production ===
Act I

- "I'll Take the Sky" – Paula
- "Body Talk" – Paula, Billy, Donna, Ensemble
- "Elliot Garfield Grant" – Elliot
- "Good News, Bad News" – Elliot, Paula and Lucy
- "Good News, Bad News (reprise)" – Elliot, Paula and Lucy
- "Get A Life" – Paula and Lucy
- "Am I Who I Think I Am?" – Elliot

Act II

- "Are You Who I Think You Are?" – Paula
- "Good News, Bad News (Reprise)" – Elliot
- "If You Break Their Hearts" – Mrs Crosby and Elliot
- "Who Would've Thought?" – Paula, Elliot, Lucy, Melanie and Cynthia
- "Do You Want to Be in My Movie?" – Elliot, Paul and the Ensemble
- "The Future Isn't What It Used to Be" – Elliot and Lucy
- "The Future Isn't What It Used to Be (reprise)" – Paula, Elliot and Lucy

== Critical response ==
Variety wrote in the review of the out-of-town tryout in Chicago: "There's some good news on the way to Broadway...Among the show's various virtues, the most surprising and wonderful is Martin Short...Peters is well cast as Paula, though she still seems to be finding her way into the role of the dancer...Marvin Hamlisch's score isn't likely to go down as one of the most memorable in Broadway history, but coupled with David Zippel's ingenious lyrics, it becomes a great asset."

Despite major changes, before the New York opening, reviews did not improve. Frank Rich in The New York Times wrote: "Even if you don't share my conviction that Bernadette Peters and Martin Short are among the most winning of performers, you still might admire how they play the losing hand they've been dealt in 'The Goodbye Girl.'" Time wrote: "THE BOTTOM LINE: Big stars, boffo story, but bad judgments turn a much anticipated show into an amiable disappointment."

According to Ken Bloom, "reviews were tepid, as was audience reaction. What should have been a major success had had trouble on the road, and a few key production staff were replaced prior to Broadway."

== Awards and nominations ==
=== Original Broadway production ===
Year	Award	Category	Nominee	Result
1993	Tony Award	Best Musical		Nominated
1993	Tony Award	Best Performance by a Leading Actor in a Musical	Martin Short	Nominated
1993	Tony Award	Best Performance by a Leading Actress in a Musical	Bernadette Peters	Nominated
1993	Tony Award	Best Choreography	Graciela Daniele	Nominated
1993	Tony Award	Best Direction of a Musical	Michael Kidd	Nominated
1993	Drama Desk Award	Outstanding Actor in a Musical	Martin Short	Nominated
1993	Drama Desk Award	Outstanding Lyrics	David Zippel	Nominated
1993	Drama Desk Award	Outstanding Music	Marvin Hamlisch	Won
1993	Theatre World Award		Martin Short	Won
