= Isabelle Stevenson Award =

Non-competitive philanthropic award

- Awarded for: "recognize an individual from the theatre community who has made a substantial contribution of volunteered time and effort on behalf of one or more humanitarian, social service or charitable organizations, regardless of whether such organizations relate to the theatre."
- Location: New York City
- Country: United States
- Presented by: American Theatre Wing and The Broadway League
- Reward: Medallion
- First award: 2009
- Currently held by: Mary-Mitchell Campbell (2026)
- Website: www.tonyawards.com

The Isabelle Stevenson Award is a non-competitive philanthropic award presented as part of the Tony Awards to "recognize an individual from the theatre community who has made a substantial contribution of volunteered time and effort on behalf of one or more humanitarian, social service or charitable organizations, regardless of whether such organizations relate to the theatre." It is named for Isabelle Stevenson, a dancer who performed for audiences all round the world and was president and later chairperson of the board of the American Theatre Wing until her death in 2003. A single recipient is chosen by the Tony Award Administration Committee and may not be presented at every ceremony. The international press regards the Tony Awards as America's most prestigious theater awards.

The American Theatre Wing and The Broadway League present the recipient with a copy of a circular brass and bronze medallion designed by art director Herman Rosse at an annual award ceremony in New York City. The award has been presented annually since the 63rd Tony Awards in 2009. Actress Phyllis Newman was chosen as its inaugural recipient for her work in establishing the Phyllis Newman Women's Health Initiative in 1995 and raising $3.5 million for the organization. Since then, another eight women and eight men have received the award and no one has been presented it more than once. As of the 79th Tony Awards in 2026, music director Mary-Mitchell Campbell is the most recent recipient in this category.

== Recipients ==
Recipients of the Isabelle Stevenson Award
Year	Image	Recipient(s)	Notes	Ref
2009	Black and white photograph of a women smiling at the camera	Phyllis Newman	Newman established The Phyllis Newman Women's Health Initiative in 1995 and raised $3.5 million for it.	
2010	A man in his early fifties looking to the left of the camera. He is wearing thin rectangular glasses and a black blazer with a light-colored shirt.	David Hyde Pierce	Pierce is an honorary member of the national board of the Alzheimer's Association and a campaigner for research into Alzheimer's disease.	
2011	A woman in her late fifties sporting short hair and earrings with the nuclear disarmament logo.	Eve Ensler	Ensler established the V-Day global movement to stop violence against girls and women through awareness and education.	
2012	Woman in her early sixties sporting curly hair and rose lipstick on her lips	Bernadette Peters	Peters co-formed the animal charity Broadway Barks with actress Mary Tyler Moore to lobby for the adoption of animal shelters for homeless pets in New York City.	
2013	Man in his mid-seventies wearing back circular shaped glasses and sporting greying facial hair	Larry Kramer	Kramer co-founded the Gay Men's Health Crisis and later established ACT UP, an international activist and direct action network to develop treatments of HIV/AIDS.	
2014	Woman in her late forties smiling at the camera	Rosie O'Donnell	O'Donnell established the non-profit arts education organization Rosie's Broadway Kids (now Rosie's Theater Kids) in 2003 to allow New York City public school students to learn dance, drama and music.	
2015	A man wearing a black blazer and shirt signing autographs onto a newspaper	Stephen Schwartz	Schwartz fostered upcoming writers as a long-time board member of the ASCAP Foundation and the ASCAP Musical Theatre Workshop. He assisted in developing new partnerships as president of the Dramatists Guild of America.	
2016	Man wearing a black leather jacket with a baby blue shirt	Brian Stokes Mitchell	Mitchell supported those in the entertainment field who had or were in a crisis or in transition in the industry through his efforts for the Actors Fund of America.	
2017	Full body portrait of a women in her late sixties smiling at the camera and with both her hands on a wall	Baayork Lee	Lee founded the National Asian Artists Project to promote Asian-American theater artists through community outreach, educational programming and performances.	
2018	–	Nick Scandalios	Scandalios, executive vice-president of Nederlander Organization, one of the largest theater operators in the United States, volunteers with the board of directors for the Family Equality Council to safeguard the rights and safety of LGBT families and their children.	
2019	Woman in her mid-sixties taking to the media at a press conference	Judith Light	Light is an HIV/AIDS advocate and a supporter of LBGT rights through her work in philanthropy.	
2020	Landscape portrait of a woman against a dark background smiling at the camera	Julie Halston	Halston was honored "for her work and advocacy in raising funding and awareness for the Pulmonary Fibrosis Foundation."	
2021	Not awarded			
2022	–	Robert E. Wankel	Wankel, the CEO for the Shubert Organization, received recognition for his support of The Actors Fund, Broadway Cares, American Academy of Dramatic Arts and that "his generosity and service to the welfare of our Broadway community, over the past four decades and, especially in the face of a global crisis, is immeasurable."	
2023	–	Jerry Mitchell	Mitchell was recognized for "his dedication and contributions to Broadway Cares/Equity Fights AIDS and for more than three decades of volunteer service through the arts."	
2024	Red carpet photos form the 2024 Library of Congress Gershwin Price concert with recipients Elton John and Bernie Taupin.	Billy Porter	Porter was honored for his "extraordinary contributions as an activist for the LGBTQ+ community" as an ambassador for the Elizabeth Taylor AIDS Foundation and as a member of the board of trustees for the Entertainment Community Fund.	
2025	A smiling woman with long blonde hair wearing a red checkered blouse and necklace. She is standing in front of a blue background.	Celia Keenan-Bolger	Keenan-Bolger received recognition for her "unwavering dedication to advocacy work through the arts", volunteering as a field organizer for the Barack Obama 2008 presidential campaign, co-founding Broadway For Obama in 2012, and advocating for same-sex marriage in the United States.	
2026		Mary-Mitchell Campbell	Campbell was recognized for her "advocacy work," as founding member of Musicians United for Social Equity (MUSE), being on the advisory board of female+ musician advocacy group Maestra, and co-founding Artists Striving to End Poverty (ASTEP), now known as Arts Ignite.	

== See also ==
- Regional Theatre Tony Award
- Special Tony Award
- Society of London Theatre Special Award
- Tony Honors for Excellence in Theatre
