= FernGully: The Last Rainforest =

1992 animated musical fantasy film by Bill Kroyer

- Theatrical release poster
- Directed by: Bill Kroyer
- Screenplay by: Jim Cox
- Based on: FernGully by Diana Young
- Produced by: Peter Faiman; Wayne Young
- Starring: Samantha Mathis; Christian Slater; Jonathan Ward; Robin Williams; Tim Curry; Grace Zabriskie
- Edited by: Gillian Hutshing
- Music by: Alan Silvestri
- Production companies: Kroyer Films (Note: Animation, ink, paint and camera services outsourced to A. Film Production, Available Light, The Chandler Group, Electric Filmworks, Hanho Animation Studios, Karen Johnson Productions, Kroyer Production Services, Luk Film, Lumeni Productions, Nick Vasu, Rough Draft Studios, Saerom, Siam Mammoth Animation, Time Art Studios, Ulimation, and Wang Film Productions.); Youngheart Productions; FAI Films
- Distributed by: 20th Century Fox
- Release dates: April 10, 1992 (North America); August 27, 1992 (Australia)
- Running time: 76 minutes
- Countries: Australia; United States
- Language: English
- Budget: $24 million
- Box office: $32.7 million

FernGully: The Last Rainforest is a 1992 animated musical fantasy film directed by Bill Kroyer from a screenplay by Jim Cox, based on the FernGully stories by Diana Young. It stars the voices of Samantha Mathis, Jonathan Ward, Tim Curry, Robin Williams, Christian Slater, and Grace Zabriskie.

The film is set in an Australian rainforest inhabited by fairies, including Crysta, who accidentally shrinks a young logger named Zak to the size of a fairy. Together, they rally the fairies and the animals of the rainforest to protect their home from the loggers and Hexxus, a malevolent pollution entity. Wayne Young, the film's producer, said that the film was "blatantly environmental", although he made an effort to avoid "preaching".

FernGully was released in North America on April 10, 1992, to mainly positive reviews, and was generally considered a moderate financial success at both the box office and in home video sales. In 1998, it was followed by a direct-to-video sequel, FernGully 2: The Magical Rescue, although none of the original voice cast reprised their roles.

== Plot ==
Crysta is a curious young fairy who lives in FernGully, a secluded rainforest east of Mount Warning. The fairies of FernGully once lived in harmony with humans, who are believed to be extinct after having been driven away by Hexxus, the dreaded spirit of destruction. Crysta is the apprentice of Magi Lune, the fairy tribe's leader, who ended Hexxus' reign of terror by sealing him inside a boab tree. One day, Crysta explores a new part of the forest and meets Batty Koda, a cowardly but comical bat who was experimented on by humans, giving him a manic and deluded personality, and an electric device sticking out of his head. Crysta accompanies Batty to investigate the humans' potential return. She meets Zak, a young teenage logger whom she inadvertently shrinks when she tries saving him from being crushed by a falling tree, although she does not know how to restore him to normal size. After she rescues him from being eaten by Lou, a hungry goanna, Zak gains Crysta's trust and agrees to go with her to FernGully so Magi can unshrink him. Along the way, they bond by talking about their lives, but Zak hides the true reason for the humans' return.

Meanwhile, the tree containing Hexxus, which Zak accidentally marked while using his spray can against a fly, is cut down and processed by his supervisors, Tony and Ralph, using a mobile sawmill. Freed from his imprisonment, Hexxus quickly regains his powers by consuming the machine's polluting elements, and tricks Tony and Ralph into driving to FernGully. In FernGully, Crysta and Zak fall in love, but they soon discover the forest's destruction by Hexxus and the machine, exposing Zak's lie about the humans' intentions. Feeling betrayed and hurt by his dishonesty, Crysta runs off as Zak comes clean. Magi sacrifices herself to give the fairies a chance to fight back, telling Crysta to remember what she has learned.

The next morning, Hexxus and the machine arrive in FernGully. Knowing the fairies' fight is hopeless, Zak convinces Batty to help him stop the machine before it destroys them. Hexxus seemingly kills Batty and scares Tony and Ralph away, but Zak, with Pips' help, manages to access the machine's cab and disable it, cutting Hexxus off from the emissions he drew upon. With Hexxus still manifesting via the oil in the machine, Crysta takes a seed and allows him to devour her, causing a tree to start growing from inside of him. Pips and the other fairies use the powers Magi bestowed them with to re-imprison Hexxus, along with the machine, within the new tree at FernGully's border. With FernGully saved, Crysta reunites with Zak and succeeds Magi as head of the fairy clan. She gives Zak a seed, asking him to remember his adventure and its lessons, before solemnly restoring him to his human size. Zak finds and revives Batty, reunites with Tony and Ralph, and plants the seed as Crysta looks on. With Hexxus defeated, the humans leave the forest and Crysta helps the seed sprout new growth for FernGully before playfully chasing Pips, with Batty following.

== Voice cast ==
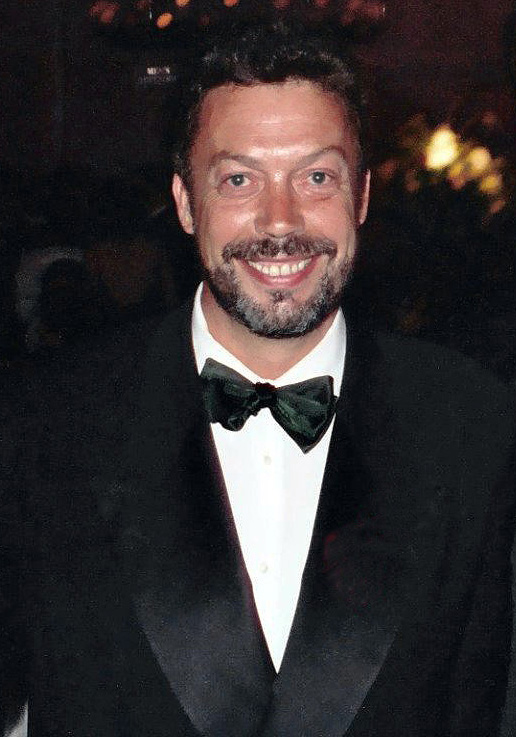
Tim Curry, pictured in 1995, provided the voice for Hexxus, the film's main antagonist.

- Samantha Mathis as Crysta
- Robin Williams as Batty Koda
- Jonathan Ward as Zak
- Christian Slater as Pips
- Tim Curry as Hexxus
- Grace Zabriskie as Magi Lune
- Geoffrey Blake as Ralph
- Robert Pastorelli as Tony
- Cheech Marin as Stump
- Tommy Chong as Root
- Tone Loc as Goanna
- Townsend Coleman as Knotty
- Brian Cummings as Ock
- Danny Mann as Ash

== Themes ==
In the book Disney, Pixar, and the Hidden Messages of Children's Films, M. Keith Booker states that FernGully "focuses on the theme of the destruction of the Earth's rainforests. In this case the rainforest is located near Mount Warning, on the eastern coast of Australia, but the theme is global, and the specific location is not particularly emphasized." Despite the environmental theme, Booker wrote that the film was "somewhat vague in its explanation of the dire consequences of rainforest destruction, and it addresses the economic impetus behind this destruction hardly at all"; the fact that the rainforest was saved at the end of the film "diminishes the urgency of its environmentalist message", and that the character of Hexxus "displaces the real blame for environmental destruction from its real perpetrators onto nonexistent supernatural perpetrators, further diluting the political message". The character of Batty was said to introduce "the secondary theme of animal experimentation, though with a light touch that presents this potentially horrifying motif as essentially humorous".

In the book, Eco-Impacts and the Greening of Postmodernity, Tom Jagtenberg and David McKie comment that radical views of ecology flourished in the film, perhaps because it was "aimed at a younger generation... and belong[s] to relatively discredited genres". As Zak is shrunk to fairy size and integrated into the fairy world, more similarities rather than differences are implied with the nonhuman characters. Crysta is said to defeat the evil Hexxus "in the manner of classic western genre heroes", although with the key difference that her weapon is a seed rather than a revolver, allowing the produce of nature to share the heroic role with her.

== Production ==
Producer Wayne Young said that his passion for the environment was his motivation for making the film, saying that the film was "blatantly environmental, although we have gone to a lot of trouble to avoid preaching. We also want it to be viewed as entertainment." The inspiration for FernGully came from stories written by his former wife, Diana Young. Diana first wrote the story of FernGully fifteen years before the film's release. Wayne said that the couple planned a film adaptation for five years, then spent "seven years of dreaming and hustling, followed by another three years of production". Wayne stated that their dream was not possible until the success of Walt Disney Feature Animation's 1989 film, The Little Mermaid, which helped bring popularity back to animation. Hand-drawn scenes in the film were complemented by computer animation, which was used to create elements, such as flocks of birds that would have taken much longer to traditionally animate. Kroyer stated that 40,000 frames of computer-generated graphics were used in the film, and that the use of such animation halved the production time. Most of the film's $24 million budget was spent on the animation and the soundtrack.

The film marked Robin Williams's first animation role, with the character Batty Koda being created specifically for him. Williams provided fourteen hours of improvised lines for the part, which had been originally conceived as an eight-minute role. Director Bill Kroyer was so impressed with the voice work that he ended up tripling the screen time given to the character. Williams would provide the voice of the Genie in Disney's Aladdin later in the year, receiving critical acclaim. Williams had already agreed to voice Batty Koda before being approached to do Aladdin. Jeffrey Katzenberg, then-chairman of Walt Disney Studios, tried to force Williams to withdraw from FernGully, on the grounds that he did not want him voicing two animated characters around the same time, but Williams refused. According to Wayne Young, Disney repeatedly interfered with the production of FernGully, twice taking over spaces that the producers had rented, by offering to pay more. When the producers eventually set up a studio in a former brewery in the San Fernando Valley, Disney attempted to purchase it. Katzenberg declined to comment on the issue when approached by Vanity Fair in 2017. The voice cast of FernGully agreed with the film's message, and worked for scale wages. The film marked the first time that both members of Cheech & Chong had worked together in six years, with the two voicing beetle brothers, Stump and Root. Cheech Marin said that "it was just like old times, but we only worked for two or three hours, had a pizza and split".

== Music ==
The film's score was composed and produced by Alan Silvestri. It was released as an album and consisted of 14 tracks, running just under 44 minutes in length.

=== Soundtrack ===
The soundtrack album was released by MCA Records. Peter Fawthrop from Allmusic gave the album three stars out of five, commenting that the songs were "lighter and more pop-driven than Disney soundtracks from the '90s, but they are not childish". All songs on the soundtrack were performed in the film.

No.	Title	Writer(s)	Performer(s)	Length
1.	"Life Is a Magic Thing"	Thomas Dolby	Johnny Clegg	4:30
2.	"Batty Rap"	Thomas Dolby	Robin Williams	2:52
3.	"If I'm Gonna Eat Somebody (It Might As Well Be You)"	Jimmy Buffett, Mike Utley	Tone Loc	4:02
4.	"Toxic Love"	Thomas Dolby	Tim Curry	4:39
5.	"Raining Like Magic"	Raffi	Raffi	3:18
6.	"Land of a Thousand Dances"	Chris Kenner	Guy	2:58
7.	"A Dream Worth Keeping"	Jimmy Webb, Alan Silvestri	Sheena Easton	4:18
8.	"Some Other World"	Elton John, Bruce Roberts	Elton John	4:43
Total length:				31:18

== Release ==
FernGully was released in the United States on April 10, 1992, and in Australia on September 17. The film was shown at the United Nations General Assembly on Earth Day, April 22.

=== Box office ===
FernGully grossed US$32.7 million worldwide, including $24.7 million from the United States, and $3.4 million in Australia. The box-office performance was described as a moderate success, although it grossed below expectations, possibly because of its ecological message. Joseph Gelmis from Newsday, however, described FernGully's box-office performance as "dismal", although he noted that it was the most successful recent non-Disney animated film. Co-executive producers, Jaime Willett and Josh Baran, who worked on the film's marketing, both spoke of the difficulties of getting attention to an animated film that was not produced by Disney, with Willett stating that box-office revenue would have at least doubled by simply having the headline, "Walt Disney presents", on the film. USA Today noted that the combined box-office gross of FernGully and the five other non-Disney animated films released in 1992 did not equal a third of the gross for Disney's 1991 film, Beauty and the Beast.

=== Critical response ===
On Rotten Tomatoes, the film has an approval rating of 68%, based on reviews from 19 critics, with an average rating of 6.4/10. On Metacritic, the film has a score of 67 out of 100, based on reviews from 15 critics, indicating "generally favorable" reviews. Audiences surveyed by CinemaScore gave the film a grade of "A" on scale of A+ to F. Roger Ebert of the Chicago Sun-Times gave it three stars out of four, saying that the film was visually "very pleasing", told a "useful lesson", "and although the movie is not a masterpiece it's pleasant to watch for its humor and sweetness". Hollis Chacona from The Austin Chronicle added that the film was "funny, pretty, touching, scary, magical stuff". Conversely, Janet Maslin of The New York Times had an unfavorable impression of the film, describing it as "an uncertain blend of sanctimonious principles and Saturday-morning cartoon aesthetics", and "more run-of-the-mill than its subject matter might indicate". According to Wayne Young, Jeffrey Katzenberg called the producers of FernGully to tell them that he loved the film.

=== Legacy ===
Wayne Young stated that portions of the film's gross would be donated to Greenpeace, the Rainforest Foundation Fund and the Sierra Club, as well as a special fund benefiting environmental projects administered worldwide by the Smithsonian Institution, although he did not disclose exact figures. The film also inspired a 1992 video game by Capstone Software and IntraCorp, called The FernGully Computerized Coloring Book. In 1998, the film was followed by a direct-to-video sequel, FernGully 2: The Magical Rescue. FAI Films, which produced only FernGully and its sequel, was acquired by HIH Insurance in 1998. HIH closed in 2001. In June 2012, administrators for HIH placed advertisements trying to sell the rights to both films. In November 2021, Shout! Factory made a deal with Machine Media Advisors, acquiring worldwide distribution rights to the film.

Some reviewers have commented that the 2009 James Cameron film, Avatar, plagiarized thematic and plot elements from FernGully, although others opined that it is simply one of many films to which Avatar is similar, or have dismissed the comparison entirely. The 2013 film Epic was also said to have a plot similar to FernGully.

== Home media ==
Four months after the theatrical release, 20th Century Fox Home Entertainment, under its previous name, "Fox Video", released FernGully on VHS and LaserDisc on August 26, 1992. Sales were strong, with approximately five million units sold by 1998, including 125,000 in Australia. Fox re-released the film on DVD in 2002. Christopher Simons from DVD Talk gave the 2002 DVD three-and-a-half stars out of five for both audio and video, although only one star for special features, noting that the only extras included were trailers for other films. A "Family Fun Edition" DVD was released in 2005. Special features included commentary with director Bill Kroyer, art director Ralph Eggleston, and coordinating art director Susan Kroyer, several featurettes, including the original featurette from 1992, the music video for "If I'm Gonna Eat Somebody (It Might As Well Be You)" by Tone Loc, as well as trailers and TV spots. Scott Weinberg from DVD Talk gave this version four stars out of five for both audio and video, and four stars for special features. For its 20th anniversary, FernGully was released on Blu-ray on March 6, 2012, containing the same special features as the "Family Fun Edition". Aaron Peck from High Def Digest gave it 3 stars out of five for video quality, four stars for audio and three-and-a-half stars for extras. Brian Orndorf from Blu-ray.com gave the release three stars out of five for video quality, three-and-a-half stars for audio and four stars for special features. In 2022, for its 30th anniversary, FernGully received a new Blu-ray release by Shout! Studios.

== Live-action film ==
In April 2026, a live-action remake directed and written by Marielle Heller was announced by Amazon MGM Studios. The film will be produced by Stacey Sher, Susan Ursitti‑Sheinberg, Jon Sheinberg, Leah Holzer, Marielle Heller, and Matt Feige. Moonli Singha will serve as executive producer.

== See also ==
- Once Upon a Forest (1993)
- List of 20th Century Fox theatrical animated feature films
