= Better Nate Than Ever (film) =

- Official release poster
- Directed by: Tim Federle
- Written by: Tim Federle
- Based on: Better Nate Than Ever by Tim Federle
- Produced by: Marc Platt; Adam Siegel
- Starring: Aria Brooks; Joshua Bassett; Michelle Federer; Rueby Wood; Norbert Leo Butz; Lisa Kudrow
- Cinematography: Declan Quinn
- Edited by: Katie McQuerrey
- Music by: Gabriel Mann
- Production companies: Walt Disney Pictures (Note: The film was originally in production at 20th Century Family as a 20th Century Studios film, but was switched over to Walt Disney Pictures before completion.); Marc Platt Productions
- Distributed by: Disney+
- Release dates: March 15, 2022 (El Capitan Theatre); April 1, 2022 (United States)
- Running time: 91 minutes
- Country: United States
- Language: English
- Budget: $36 million

Better Nate Than Ever is a 2022 American musical comedy film written and directed by Tim Federle, based on his 2013 novel of the same name. Described as a coming-of-age story involving musical theater and Broadway, the story centers on the titular Nate Foster, played by Rueby Wood in his first film role. Lisa Kudrow, Aria Brooks and Joshua Bassett appear in supporting roles.

Better Nate Than Ever had its world premiere at the El Capitan Theatre in Hollywood on March 15, 2022, and was released in the United States as a Disney+ original film on April 1. It received generally positive reviews from critics and received eight nominations at the 1st Children's and Family Emmy Awards, including Outstanding Fiction Special, Outstanding Lead Performance for Wood and Outstanding Supporting Performance for Kudrow.

The film was removed from Disney+ on May 26, 2023, amidst a Disney+ and Hulu content removal purge as part of a broader cost cutting initiative under Disney CEO Bob Iger. It was, however, re-released on multiple video-on-demand platforms on September 26, 2023.

== Plot ==
Nate Foster is a 13-year-old boy who lives in Pittsburgh and dreams of being a Broadway star. His parents, Rex and Sherrie, are understanding while his older brother Anthony is put off by his odd behavior. At school, Nate is picked on and gets passed over major roles in a school play, but finds solace in his only friend Libby who supports him in his endeavors despite her own stage fright. She informs him that auditions are being held for a Broadway adaptation of Lilo & Stitch, but Nate is unsure whether he can make it. As luck would have it, Nate's parents decide to get away for a while. Anthony uses the opportunity to hang out with his friends while Nate feigns spending the night at Libby's house. Nate and Libby sneak away on a bus to New York City without telling anyone.

Nate and Libby locate where to audition, but are informed that they need a parent or guardian present. By chance, Nate's maternal aunt Heidi, a struggling actress, happens to be there to audition for A Solitary Woman and Nate passes her off as his guardian. While Heidi is happy to see Nate, she decides to do the responsible thing and call Sherrie to inform her sister of her son's whereabouts. Having lost Sherrie's phone number, Heidi is given Libby's number by Nate and is tricked by Nate, making her believe that he has his parents' approval. Nate goes into the audition, but when he tries to show off his knee dancing from Fiddler on the Roof he accidentally rips his pants and humiliates himself. Nate prepares to return to Pittsburgh with Libby, believing that he has failed, but learns he got a callback. Libby cannot bring herself to stay with Nate in New York and admits her feelings for him. Nate gently turns her down by informing her that he does not think of her that way. He stays for the callback which involves giving a monologue that impresses the casting directors.

Not having a place to stay, and needing to earn money, Nate discovers street performers and begins to sing, becoming a TikTok star overnight. He calls Libby, who responds positively to the news before going to the Museum of Natural History to find Heidi, who, while upset that Nate did not return home, gives him a place to stay. Heidi is revealed to have had a falling out with her sister in the past due to their clashing dreams. She nevertheless supports Nate's endeavors and hopes that he will make the audition. Back at home, Anthony discovers Nate's TikTok video and heads over to Libby's house to demand an explanation for what is happening. In the morning, Anthony and Libby arrive at Heidi's apartment in New York to pick Nate up. Nate tells Anthony that he is aware that he embarrasses him, but that he needs to go to the audition to achieve his dream. He escapes out a fire exit (something he has always wanted to do) while Heidi informs Libby about being an agent.

Nate arrives to audition for Stitch and feels embarrassed when the other auditioners laugh at him for reading all the characters' lines in the script instead of just Stitch's as originally required. He begins to sing "No One Gets Left Behind", but stumbles when Heidi, Anthony and Libby arrive and gives up. Anthony shouts that Nate does not embarrass him, which encourages Nate to continue singing and give a remarkable performance. Nate makes up with Anthony, who found his audition impressive. Nate also encourages Heidi to not give up on her dreams and to make up with Sherrie. On the drive back home, Anthony gets into show tunes and Libby accepts being Nate's platonic friend. The next day at school, Nate is called into the principal's office where his parents learned what happened and reveal that he successfully landed the part. The movie ends with Nate performing in the musical, with Anthony, Libby, Heidi, and his parents in the audience, with Sherrie and Heidi having reconciled, and Heidi getting the lead role in A Solitary Woman.

== Cast ==
- Rueby Wood as Nate Foster
- Aria Brooks as Libby Reneé, a theater kid and Nate's best friend
- Joshua Bassett as Anthony Foster, Nate's older brother
- Michelle Federer as Sherrie Foster, Nate and Anthony's mother and Heidi's sister
- Norbert Leo Butz as Rex Foster, Nate and Anthony's father
- Lisa Kudrow as Aunt Heidi, Nate and Anthony's maternal aunt and Sherrie's sister
- Brooks Ashmanskas as Casting Director
- Priscilla Lopez as Serious Play Casting Director
- Krystina Alabado as Assistant Casting Director
- Kayla Davion as Assistant Choreographer
- Anaseini Katoa as Director
- Finn Egan-Liang as Jimmy Madison
- Keola Simpson as Garrett Kekoa
- Kim Berrios Lin as Stage Mother
- Kylie Kuioka as Stage Daughter
- George Benson as himself

== Production ==
=== Development and casting ===
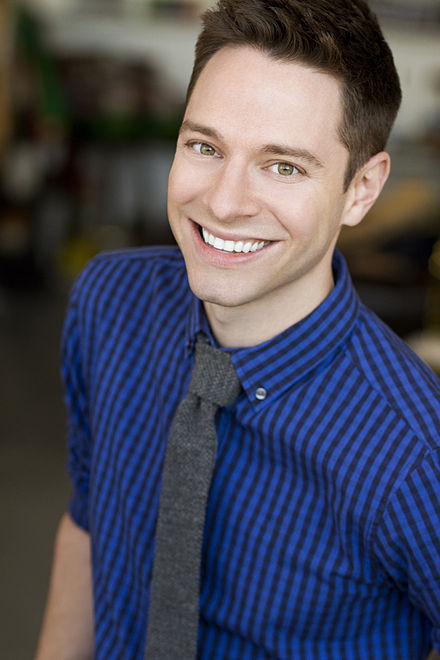
Tim Federle adapted his own novel for the screen and directed the film.

Lisa Fragner secured the rights to adapt the book into a feature film under Fox Family. In January 2021, The Walt Disney Company had an open casting-call for a film adaptation of Better Nate Than Ever. By March of the same year, it was announced that the film had officially been green-lit, with production scheduled to take place in New York City. The project entered pre-production under the working title Pittsburgh. Tim Federle, author of the original novel series on which the film is based, will serve as writer/director. Marc Platt and Adam Siegel will serve as producers, with Platt co-producing the film under his Marc Platt Productions banner with Walt Disney Pictures.

In June 2021, Lisa Kudrow joined the cast as Nate's aunt Heidi. Primary characters Nate and Libby were also cast, albeit with as-of-yet unnamed actors in the roles. By August of the same year, Norbert Leo Butz joined the cast in a supporting role.

On November 12, 2021, it was announced that Rueby Wood was cast as the main character, Nate Foster. In addition, Joshua Bassett and Aria Brooks were revealed to play Nate's older brother, Anthony Foster and Libby, a fellow theater kid who sneaks off to New York City with Nate.

Federle said that adapting a book he wrote allowed him to make several changes while being faithful to the source material, such as expanding the roles of Libby and Anthony. Due to the film being a Disney production, he chose to change the musical Nate auditions for from a fictional version of the 1982 Steven Spielberg science fiction family film E.T. the Extra-Terrestrial to a fictional musical version of the 2002 animated Disney film Lilo & Stitch.

=== Filming ===
Principal photography commenced in New York City, in June 2021. Some scenes were also filmed at Archbishop Stepinac High School in White Plains, New York that same month. Filming also took place in the New Amsterdam Theatre in New York City.

== Release ==
Better Nate Than Ever had its world premiere at the El Capitan Theatre on March 15, 2022, and was released exclusively on Disney+ on April 1, 2022, This film was released under the Walt Disney Pictures banner instead of 20th Century Studios. The film was removed from Disney+ on May 26, 2023. In response to backlash surrounding this, it was re-released digitally on multiple platforms including Amazon Prime Video, Vudu and Google Play on September 26, 2023.

== Reception ==
=== Critical reception ===
On the review aggregator website Rotten Tomatoes, 83% of 47 critics' reviews are positive, with an average rating of 6.7/10. The site's critical consensus reads: "A modern musical with old-fashioned charm, Better Nate Than Ever hits heartwarming high notes with its joyous message of self-acceptance." Metacritic assigned the film a score of 66 out of 100 based on 6 critics, indicating "generally favorable" reviews.

Courtney Howard of Variety wrote: "As far as sentiments go, the film’s heart is in the right place. It’s LGBT-positive in terms of representation and acts as a love letter to musical artistic expression." Pittsburgh Post-Gazette stated: "Better Nate Than Ever is likely to serve as a charming celebration of young dreamers and how far they’ll go to find a community that fully accepts them." Petrana Radulovic of Polygon gave a positive review, calling it a "delight" that is "an ode to theater kids (and wannabe theater kids) everywhere." Amy Nicholson of The New York Times praised the performances of the actors and found the script creative, but stated that the movie does not engage explicitly enough with LGBT themes. Jennifer Green of Common Sense Media rated the film 4 out of 5 stars and wrote: "Better Nate Than Ever is a charming tween musical about celebrating differences and following your dreams based on Tim Federle's same-named book. [...] The film has positive messages about staying true to yourself and accepting friends and relatives for who they are, sometimes making personal sacrifices for their benefit." Nell Minow of RogerEbert.com gave the movie a 3,5 out of 4 stars rating, praised the performances of the cast, complimented the humor, and found the film manages to depict a positive render of musicals. Screen Rant reviewed the movie 3 out of 5, writing, "Better Nate Than Ever is full of charm, supportive friendships and familial relationships, and a passionate love of musical theater and these elements work together to create a lovely, entertaining viewing experience." Jason Struss of Digital Trends wrote: "In the slight but exhaustingly charming Disney+ original movie [...] Better Nate Than Ever is ultimately a throwaway movie, fine enough for kids and bearable for parents, and it isn’t particularly notable."

=== Accolades ===
Year	Award	Category	Nominee(s)	Results	Ref.
2022	Children's and Family Emmy Awards	Outstanding Fiction Special	Better Nate Than Ever	Nominated	
2022	Children's and Family Emmy Awards	Outstanding Lead Performance	Rueby Wood	Nominated	
2022	Children's and Family Emmy Awards	Outstanding Supporting Performance	Lisa Kudrow	Nominated	
2022	Children's and Family Emmy Awards	Outstanding Writing for a Young Teen Program	Tim Federle	Nominated	
2022	Children's and Family Emmy Awards	Outstanding Music Direction and Composition for a Live Action Program	Gabriel Mann	Nominated	
2022	Children's and Family Emmy Awards	Outstanding Cinematography for a Live Action Single-Camera Program	Declan Quinn	Won	
2022	Children's and Family Emmy Awards	Outstanding Casting for a Live-Action Program	Patrick Goodwin, Bethany Knox, Bernie Telsey	Nominated	
2022	Children's and Family Emmy Awards	Outstanding Choreography	Zach Woodlee	Nominated	
2023	Artios Awards	Outstanding Achievement in Casting - Film - Non-Theatrical Release	Bernard Telsey, Bethany Knox, Pat Goodwin	Nominated	
2023	GLAAD Media Awards	Outstanding Kids and Family Programming - Live Action	Better Nate Than Ever	Nominated	
