= 20th Century Studios =

American film production and distribution company

20th Century Studios, Inc.
- Logo used since 2020

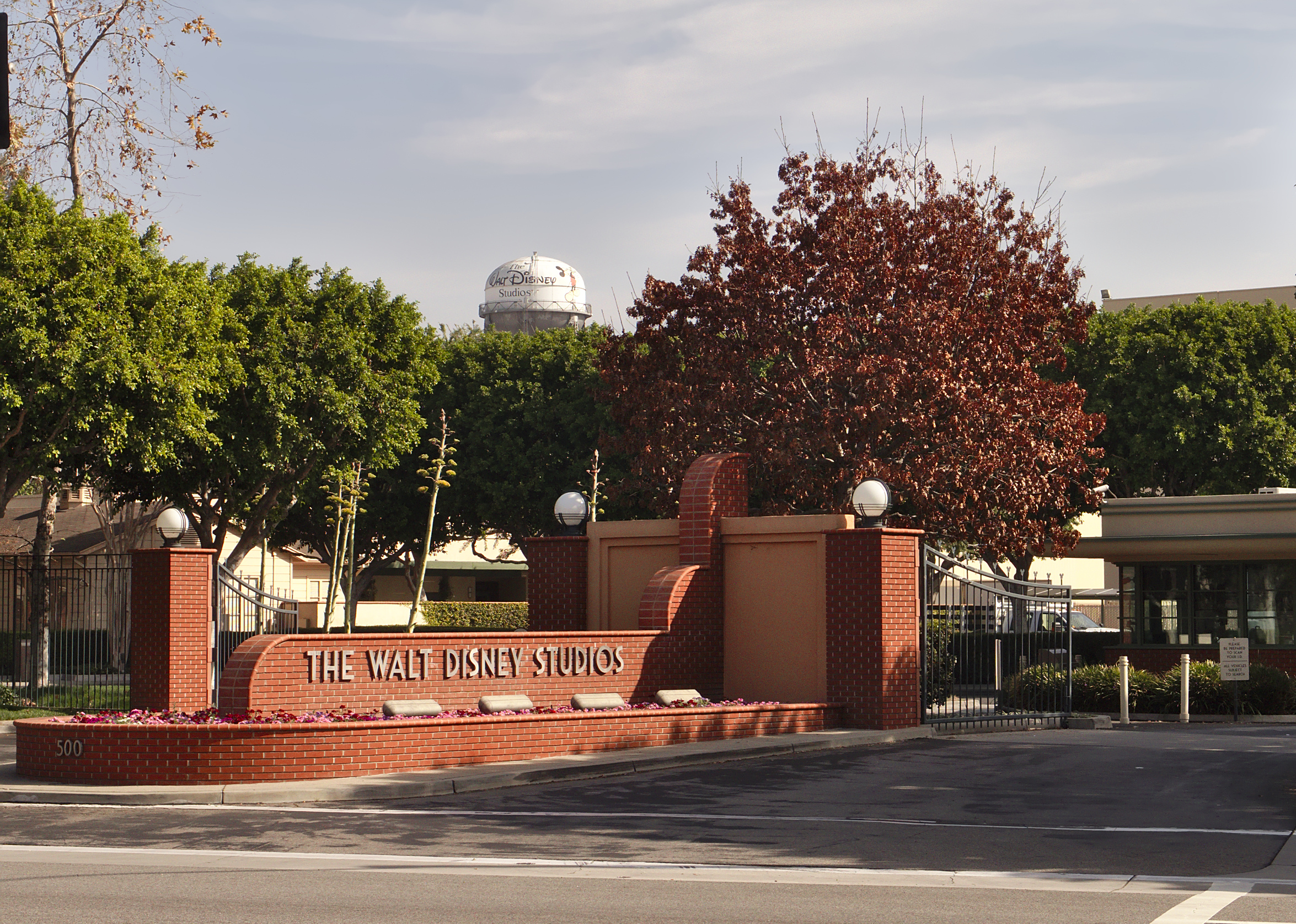
- The Walt Disney Studios' Riverside Drive property in Burbank, California
- Formerly: Twentieth Century-Fox Film Corporation (1935–1985); Twentieth Century Fox Film Corporation (1985–2020)
- Type: Subsidiary
- Industry: Film
- Predecessors: Fox Film; Twentieth Century Pictures
- Founded: May 31, 1935; 91 years ago
- Founders: Joseph M. Schenck; Darryl F. Zanuck; William Fox
- Headquarters: 500 Buena Vista Street, Burbank, California, United States
- Area served: Worldwide
- Key people: David Greenbaum (president, Walt Disney Pictures and 20th Century Studios); Steve Asbell (president, 20th Century Studios)
- Products: Film distribution; Film production
- Number of employees: 500 (2024)
- Parent: News Corporation (1985–2013); 21st Century Fox (2013–2019); Walt Disney Studios (2019–present)
- Divisions: 20th Century Animation; 20th Century Family; 20th Century Games; 20th Century Comics (comic imprint, in partnership with Marvel Comics)
- Website: 20thcenturystudios.com

20th Century Studios, Inc., formerly Twentieth Century Fox Film Corporation, (Note: Shortened to 20th Century Fox or simply Fox. The studio was originally named Twentieth Century-Fox Film Corporation or 20th Century-Fox (with a hyphen) until 1985.) is an American film production and distribution company owned by the Walt Disney Studios, the film studios division of the Disney Entertainment business segment of the Walt Disney Company. It was headquartered at the Fox Studio Lot in the Century City area of Los Angeles, until its lease with Fox Corporation ended and it was relocated to the Walt Disney Studios in Burbank. Walt Disney Studios Motion Pictures distributes and markets the films produced by this studio in theatrical markets.

For over 90 years, 20th Century has been one of the major American film studios. It was founded on May 31, 1935, by the merger of Fox Film Corporation and Twentieth Century Pictures, and was one of the original "Big Five" among eight majors of Hollywood's Golden Age. In 1985, it was acquired by Rupert Murdoch's News Corporation, which was renamed 21st Century Fox in 2013 after it spun off its publishing assets. Disney purchased most of 21st Century Fox's assets, which included 20th Century Fox, on March 20, 2019. The studio adopted its current name on January 17, 2020, in order to avoid confusion with Fox Corporation, and subsequently started to use it for the copyright of 20th Century and Searchlight Pictures productions on December 4. 20th Century is currently one of five live-action film studios within the Walt Disney Studios, alongside Walt Disney Pictures, Marvel Studios, Lucasfilm, and its sister speciality unit, Searchlight Pictures. 20th Century also releases animated films produced by its animation division, 20th Century Animation.

The first six Star Wars films, X-Men, Avatar, Ice Age, Alien and Planet of the Apes are 20th Century's most commercially successful franchises, while the studio's library includes many notable films such as The Sound of Music, Independence Day and Titanic, with two of the three films winning the Academy Award for Best Picture, and all of them were among the highest-grossing films of all time, with Titanic breaking the record during its initial release.

== History ==
=== From founding to 1956 ===
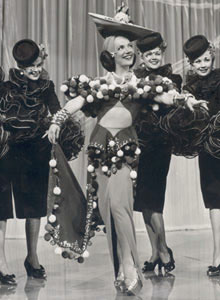
Carmen Miranda as Dorita in The Gang's All Here. In 1946 she was the highest-paid actress in the United States.

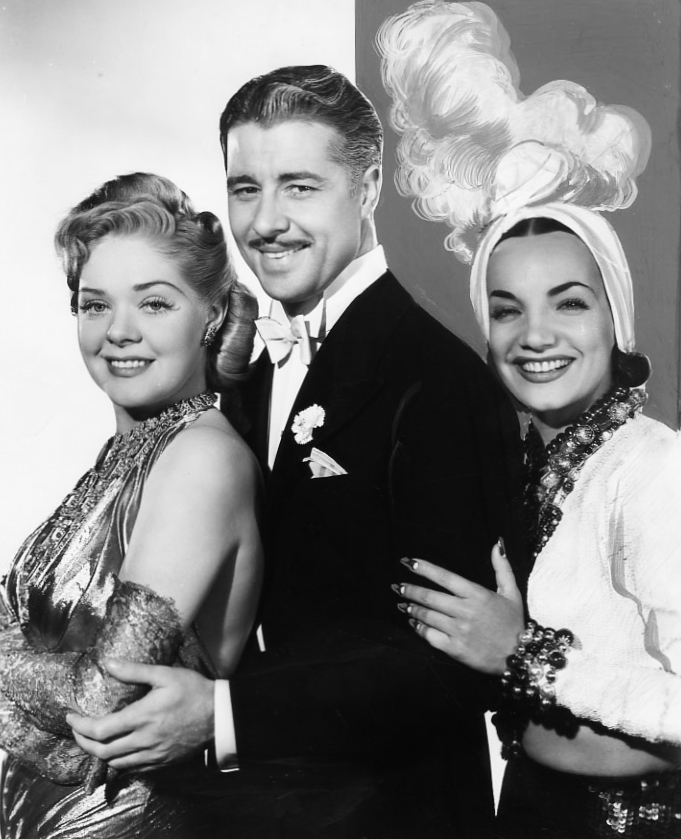
Alice Faye as Baroness Cecilia Duarte, Don Ameche as Larry Martin and Baron Manuel Duarte, and Carmen Miranda as Carmen in That Night in Rio, produced by Fox in 1941

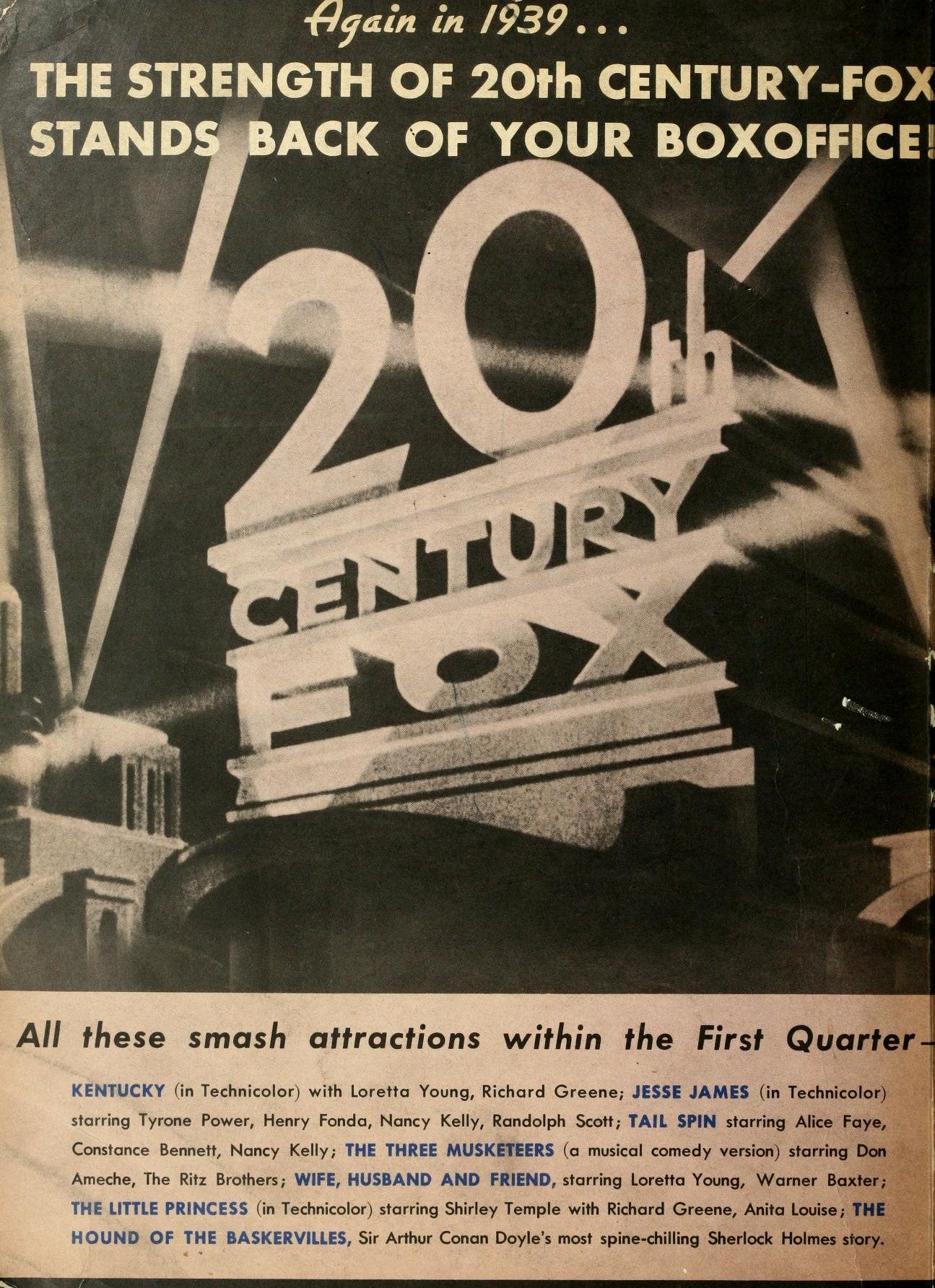
The 20th Century-Fox logo depicted in a 1939 advertisement in Boxoffice

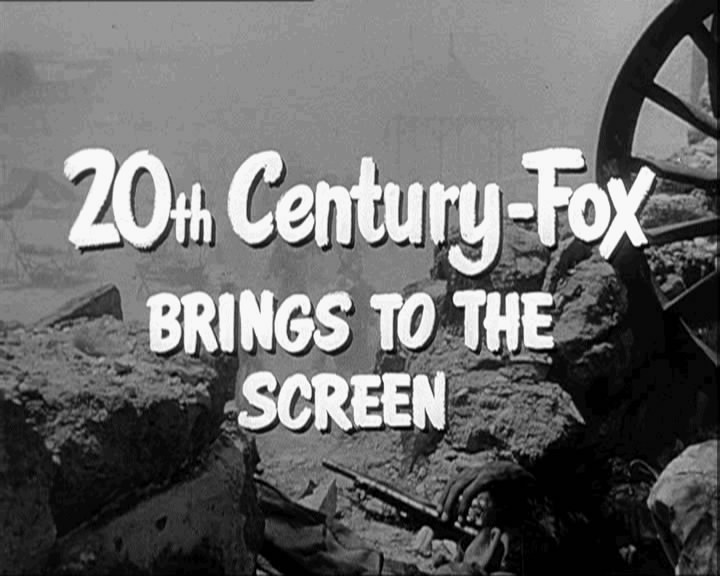
From the 1952 film Viva Zapata!

Twentieth Century Pictures' Joseph Schenck and Darryl F. Zanuck left United Artists over a stock dispute and began merger talks with the management of financially struggling Fox Film under President Sidney Kent.

Spyros Skouras, then manager of the Fox West Coast Theaters, helped make it happen (and later became president of the new company). The company had been struggling since founder William Fox lost control of it in 1930.

Fox Film Corporation and Twentieth Century Pictures merged in 1935. Initially it was speculated in The New York Times that the newly merged company would be named Fox-Twentieth Century. The new company, Twentieth Century-Fox Film Corporation, began trading on May 31, 1935. Kent remained at the company, joining Schenck and Zanuck. Zanuck replaced Winfield Sheehan as the company's production chief.

The company established a special training school. Lynn Bari, Patricia Farr, and Anne Nagel were among 14 young women "launched on the trail of film stardom" on August 6, 1935, when they each received a six-month contract with Twentieth Century-Fox after spending 18 months in the school. The contracts included a studio option for renewal for as long as seven years.

For many years Twentieth Century-Fox identified itself as having been founded in 1915, which was the year that Fox Film was founded. For instance, it marked 1945 as its 30th anniversary. However, in recent years it has considered the 1935 merger as its founding date, even though most film historians agree it was launched in 1915 with the founding of Fox Film. The company's films retained the Twentieth Century Pictures searchlight logo and fanfare in the opening credits but with the name changed to Twentieth Century-Fox.

After the merger was completed, Zanuck signed young actors to help carry Twentieth Century-Fox: Tyrone Power, Linda Darnell, Carmen Miranda, Don Ameche, Henry Fonda, Gene Tierney, Sonja Henie, and Betty Grable. Twentieth Century-Fox also hired Alice Faye and Shirley Temple, who appeared in several major films for the studio in the 1930s.

Higher movie attendance during World War II helped Twentieth Century-Fox overtake RKO and Metro-Goldwyn-Mayer to become the third most profitable film studio. In 1941 Zanuck was commissioned as a lieutenant colonel in the U.S. Signal Corps and assigned to supervise the production of U.S. Army training films. His partner William Goetz filled in at the Twentieth Century-Fox office while he was away.

In 1942 Spyros Skouras succeeded Kent as president of the studio. During the next few years, with pictures like Wilson (1944), The Razor's Edge (1946), Boomerang, Gentleman's Agreement (both 1947), The Snake Pit (1948), and Pinky (1949), Zanuck established a reputation for provocative films for adults. Twentieth Century-Fox also specialized in adaptations of best-selling books such as Ben Ames Williams' Leave Her to Heaven (1945), starring Gene Tierney, which was the highest-grossing Twentieth Century-Fox film of the 1940s. The studio also produced film versions of Broadway musicals, including the Rodgers and Hammerstein titles, beginning with State Fair (1945), the only musical they wrote for the screen.

After the war, audiences slowly drifted away. Twentieth Century-Fox held on to its theaters until a court-mandated "divorce"; they were spun off as Fox National Theaters in 1953. That year, with attendance at half the 1946 numbers, Twentieth Century-Fox gambled on an unproven filming process. Noting that the two film sensations of 1952 had been in the Cinerama format, which required three projectors to fill a giant curved screen, and in "Natural Vision" 3D, which got its effects of depth by requiring the use of polarized glasses, Twentieth Century-Fox mortgaged its studio to buy the rights to a French anamorphic projection system which gave a slight illusion of depth without glasses. President Spyros Skouras struck a deal with the inventor Henri Chrétien, leaving the other film studios empty-handed, and in 1953 introduced CinemaScope with the studio's groundbreaking feature film The Robe.

Zanuck announced in February 1953 that henceforth all Twentieth Century-Fox pictures would be made in CinemaScope. To convince theater owners to install this new process, Twentieth Century-Fox agreed to help pay conversion costs (about $25,000 per screen); and to ensure enough product, Twentieth Century-Fox leased access to CinemaScope to any rival studio choosing to use it. Seeing the box-office returns for the first two CinemaScope releases, The Robe and How to Marry a Millionaire (also 1953), Warner Bros., MGM, RKO, Universal-International, Columbia, UA, Allied Artists, and Disney quickly adopted the process. In 1956 Twentieth Century-Fox engaged Robert Lippert to establish the subsidiary company Regal Pictures (later Associated Producers Incorporated) to film B movies in CinemaScope but branded as RegalScope. Twentieth Century-Fox produced new musicals using the CinemaScope process including Carousel and The King and I (both 1956).

CinemaScope resulted in a brief uptick in attendance, but by 1956 the numbers again began to slide. That year Darryl Zanuck announced his resignation as head of production. Zanuck moved to Paris and set himself up as an independent producer, seldom returning to the United States for many years. In mid-1956 the company loaned its pre-1948 film library, including TV distribution rights but not the copyrights of these titles, to National Telefilm Associates for 10 years.

=== Production and financial problems ===
Logo used as Twentieth Century Fox from 1985 to 2020.

Zanuck's successor, producer Buddy Adler, died a year later. President Spyros Skouras brought in a series of production executives, but none had Zanuck's success. By the early 1960s, Twentieth Century-Fox was in trouble. A new version of Cleopatra (1963) began production in 1959 with Joan Collins in the lead. As a publicity gimmick, producer Walter Wanger offered $1 million to Elizabeth Taylor if she would star; she accepted and costs for Cleopatra began to escalate. Richard Burton's on-set romance with Taylor was surrounding the media. However, Skouras' selfish preferences and inexperienced micromanagement on the film's production did nothing to speed up production on Cleopatra.

Meanwhile, another remake—of the Cary Grant hit My Favorite Wife (1940)—was rushed into production in an attempt to turn over a quick profit to help keep Twentieth Century-Fox afloat. The romantic comedy entitled Something's Got to Give paired Marilyn Monroe, Twentieth Century-Fox's most bankable star of the 1950s, with Dean Martin and director George Cukor. The troubled Monroe caused delays daily, and it quickly descended into a costly debacle. As Cleopatra's budget passed $10 million, eventually costing around $40 million, Twentieth Century-Fox sold its back lot (now the site of Century City) to Alcoa in 1961 to raise funds. After several weeks of script rewrites on the Monroe picture and very little progress, mostly due to director George Cukor's filming methods, in addition to Monroe's chronic sinusitis, Monroe was fired from Something's Got to Give and two months later she was found dead. According to Twentieth Century-Fox files, she was rehired within weeks for a two-picture deal totaling $1 million, $500,000 to finish Something's Got to Give (plus a bonus at completion), and another $500,000 for What a Way to Go. Elizabeth Taylor's disruptive reign on the Cleopatra set continued unchallenged from 1960 into 1962, though three Twentieth Century-Fox executives went to Rome in June 1962 to fire her. They learned that director Joseph L. Mankiewicz had filmed out of sequence and had only done interiors, so Twentieth Century-Fox was then forced to allow Taylor several more weeks of filming. In the meantime during that summer of 1962 Fox released nearly all of its contract stars to offset burgeoning costs, including Jayne Mansfield.

With few pictures on the schedule, Skouras wanted to rush Zanuck's big-budget war epic The Longest Day (1962), an accurate account of the Allied invasion of Normandy on June 6, 1944, with a huge international cast, into release as another source of quick cash. This offended Zanuck, still Twentieth Century-Fox's largest shareholder, for whom The Longest Day was a labor of love that he had dearly wanted to produce for many years. After it became clear that Something's Got to Give would not be able to progress without Monroe in the lead (Martin had refused to work with anyone else), Skouras finally decided that re-signing her was unavoidable. But days before filming was due to resume, she was found dead at her Los Angeles home and the picture resumed filming as Move Over, Darling, with Doris Day and James Garner in the leads. Released in 1963, the film was a hit. The unfinished scenes from Something's Got to Give were shelved for nearly 40 years. Rather than being rushed into release as if it were a B-picture, The Longest Day was lovingly and carefully produced under Zanuck's supervision. It was finally released at a length of three hours and was well received.

At the next board meeting, Zanuck spoke for eight hours, convincing directors that Skouras was mismanaging the company and that he was the only possible successor. Zanuck was installed as chairman, and then named his son Richard Zanuck as president. This new management group seized Cleopatra and rushed it to completion, shut down the studio, laid off the entire staff to save money, axed the long-running Movietone Newsreel (the archives of which are now owned by Fox News), and made a series of cheap, popular pictures that restored Twentieth Century-Fox as a major studio. The saving grace for the studio's fortunes came from the tremendous success of The Sound of Music (1965), an expensive and handsomely produced film adaptation of the highly acclaimed Rodgers and Hammerstein Broadway musical, which became a significant success at the box office and won five Academy Awards, including Best Director (Robert Wise) and Best Picture of the Year.

Twentieth Century-Fox also had two big science-fiction hits in the decade: Fantastic Voyage (1966), and the original Planet of the Apes (1968), starring Charlton Heston, Kim Hunter, and Roddy McDowall. Fantastic Voyage was the last film made in CinemaScope; the studio had held on to the format while Panavision lenses were being used elsewhere.

Zanuck stayed on as chairman until 1971, but there were several expensive flops in his last years, resulting in Twentieth Century-Fox posting losses from 1969 to 1971. Following his removal and replacement by Dennis Stanfill as chairman, and after an uncertain period, new management brought Twentieth Century-Fox back to health. Under president Gordon T. Stulberg and production head Alan Ladd, Jr., Twentieth Century-Fox films connected with modern audiences. Board chairman Dennis Stanfill used the profits to acquire resort properties, soft-drink bottlers, Australian theaters and other properties in an attempt to diversify enough to offset the boom-or-bust cycle of picture-making.

Foreshadowing a pattern of film production still yet to come, in late 1973 Twentieth Century-Fox partnered with Warner Bros. to co-produce The Towering Inferno (1974), an all-star action blockbuster from producer Irwin Allen. Both studios found themselves owning the rights to books about burning skyscrapers. Allen insisted on a meeting with the heads of both studios and announced that as Twentieth Century-Fox was already in the lead with their property it would be career suicide to have competing movies. Thus the first joint-venture studio deal was struck. In hindsight, while it may be commonplace now, back in the 1970s, it was a risky, but revolutionary, idea that paid off handsomely at both domestic and international box offices around the world.

Twentieth Century-Fox's success reached new heights by backing the most profitable film made up to that time, Star Wars (1977). Substantial financial gains were realized as a result of the film's unprecedented success: from a low of $6 in June 1976, stock prices more than quadrupled to almost $27 after Star Wars release; 1976 revenues of $195 million rose to $301 million in 1977.

=== Marvin Davis and Rupert Murdoch ===
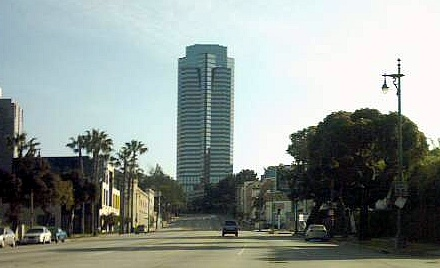
Fox Plaza, Century City headquarters completed in 1987

With financial stability came new owners, and 20th Century-Fox was sold for $720 million on June 8, 1981, to investors Marc Rich and Marvin Davis. 20th Century-Fox's assets at the time included Pebble Beach Golf Links, the Aspen Skiing Company and a Century City property upon which Davis built and twice sold Fox Plaza.

In 1982, the company decided to try on capitalizing the video game industry by forming the company's first video game division, Fox Video Games, in order to sell cartridges for consoles and computers, under the "Games of the Century" slogan. The division failed due to the video game crash of 1983.

By 1984, Rich had become a fugitive from justice, having fled to Switzerland after being charged by U.S. federal prosecutors with tax evasion, racketeering and illegal trading with Iran during the Iran hostage crisis. Rich's assets were frozen by U.S. authorities. In 1984, Marvin Davis bought out Marc Rich's 50% interest in 20th Century-Fox Film Corporation for an undisclosed amount, reported to be $116 million. In late 1983 and 1984, Australian businessman Rupert Murdoch made an unsuccessful attempt at acquiring Warner Communications, which included film studio Warner Bros. Pictures and other assets such as Warner Music Group. After failing to acquire Warner Communications through his company News Corporation, Murdoch shifted his attention to acquiring Twentieth Century-Fox. Davis sold a 50% stake in Twentieth Century-Fox to News Corporation for $250 million in March 1985. Davis later backed out of a deal with Murdoch to purchase John Kluge's Metromedia television stations. Murdoch went ahead alone and bought the stations. Murdoch later bought out Davis' remaining stake in Twentieth Century-Fox for $325 million. In 1985, the hyphen was permanently deleted from the brand name, with Twentieth Century-Fox changing to Twentieth Century Fox.

To gain FCC approval of 20th Century-Fox's purchase of Metromedia's television holdings, once the stations of the long-dissolved DuMont network, Murdoch had to become a U.S. citizen. He did so in 1985, and in 1986 the new Fox Broadcasting Company took to the air. The network's visual imagery has often incorporated the searchlights of 20th Century Fox's logo. Over the next 20-odd years the network and owned-stations group expanded to become extremely profitable for News Corporation. Between the 1980s and 2010s, it aired in-house programming produced by 20th Century Fox's television studios (such as Family Guy, The Simpsons and The X-Files), as well as outside content from other studios (such as Beverly Hills 90210, Married... with Children and The O.C.). In 1994, News Corporation launched FX, which evolved into a premium cable network utilizing Fox's television production capabilities. That year, it also co-founded Foxtel, which went on to become Australia's main pay television provider. In 1996, News Corporation launched the popular cable news channel Fox News. All three of these entities initially used logos which were inspired by 20th Century Fox's searchlight logo design. Beginning in the mid-1990s, News Corporation also utilized the 20th Century Fox brand when launching various cable sports channels around the world, with these channels being branded Fox Sports channels.

In 1994, 20th Century Fox would establish four new divisions: Fox Searchlight Pictures, Fox Family Films, Fox Animation Studios, and Fox 2000 Pictures. Fox Searchlight would specialize in the specialty and indie film market, with Thomas Rothman, then president of production at The Samuel Goldwyn Company, being brought on to head up the new studio. Fox Family Films produced films geared towards families, under John Matoian. Fox Animation Studios was established on August 9, 1994, designed to compete with Walt Disney Feature Animation, which at the time had found commercial success with animated films (a time known as the Disney Renaissance). Don Bluth and Gary Goldman of the failing Sullivan Bluth Studios were appointed to head the new $100 million animation studio. Fox 2000 Pictures was formed to specialize in mid-budget-ranging films targeted towards underserved groups of audiences, with Laura Ziskin brought on as president. In November 1995, 20th Century Fox entered a $50 million agreement to purchase the library of bankrupt Carolco Pictures, which would have given Fox the rights to make a sequel based on the hit Carolco film Terminator 2: Judgement Day. However, Fox dropped their bid in January 1996, after French company Canal+ submitted a $58 million counterbid for the assets.

In January 1997, News Corporation acquired New World Communications for $2.48 billion, and folded the acquired television operations and library into 20th Century Fox. In June 1997, News Corporation acquired The Family Channel as part of a joint venture with Saban Entertainment, renaming it the Fox Family Channel. The Fox Family Channel would later be sold to Disney for $5.2 billion in October 2001. As part of the sale, Disney acquired the rights to various children's programs which originally aired on the Fox network's Fox Kids block and the Fox Family Channel, in addition to acquiring Saban Entertainment and its library of 6,500 television episodes.

In August 1997, Fox's Los Angeles-based visual effects company, VIFX, acquired majority interest in Blue Sky Studios to form a new visual effects and animation company, temporarily renamed "Blue Sky/VIFX". Blue Sky had previously did the character animation of MTV Films' first film Joe's Apartment. Following the studio's expansion, Blue Sky produced character animation for the films Alien Resurrection, A Simple Wish, Mouse Hunt, Star Trek: Insurrection and Fight Club. VIFX was later sold to another VFX studio Rhythm and Hues Studios in March 1999. According to Blue Sky founder Chris Wedge, Fox considered selling Blue Sky as well by 2000 due to financial difficulties in the visual effects industry in general.

20th Century Fox acquired a 20% stake in film production company New Regency in September 1997, and as part of the deal became their distributor for the next 15 years, with the deal later being renewed past 2012. Regency previously had a distribution deal with Warner Bros. Pictures and intended to renew this deal, but talks between the two parties broke down in July 1997. In 2015, Warner's distribution rights to most of the pre-Fox Regency films expired, and 20th Century Fox subsequently became the new distributor for these films, despite these films still having the Warner Bros. opening logo.

In February 1998, following the success of Fox Animation Studios' first film Anastasia, Fox Family Films changed its name to Fox Animation Studios and dropped its live action production. which would be picked up by other production units. The actual Fox Animation Studios would become a division of the formerly-named Fox Family Films, being referred to as the Phoenix studio. However, Fox Animation Studios in Los Angeles would be renamed to 20th Century Fox Animation between 1998 and 1999. The Phoenix studio would face financial problems, eventually with Fox laying off 300 of the nearly 380 people who worked at the Phoenix studio to "make films more efficiently". After the box-office failure of Titan A.E., Fox Animation Studios would shut down on June 26, 2000. Their last film set to be made would have been an adaptation of Wayne Barlowe's illustrated novel Barlowe's Inferno, and was set to be done entirely with computer animation. Another film they would have made was The Little Beauty King, an adult animated film directed by Steve Oedekerk, which would have been a satire of the films from the Disney Renaissance. It would predate Shrek (2001).

Chris Wedge, film producer Lori Forte, and Fox Animation executive Chris Meledandri presented Fox with a script for a comedy feature film titled Ice Age. Studio management pressured staff to sell their remaining shares and options to Fox on the promise of continued employment on feature-length films. The studio moved to White Plains, New York and started production on Ice Age. As the film wrapped, Fox, having little faith in the film, feared that it might bomb at the box office. Fox terminated half of the production staff and tried unsuccessfully to find a buyer for the film and the studio. Instead, Ice Age was released by Fox in conjunction with Twentieth Century Fox Animation on March 15, 2002, to critical and commercial success, receiving a nomination for an Academy Award for Best Animated Feature at the 75th Academy Awards in 2003. Ice Age would spawn a franchise and bolster Blue Sky into producing feature films and becoming a household name in feature animation.

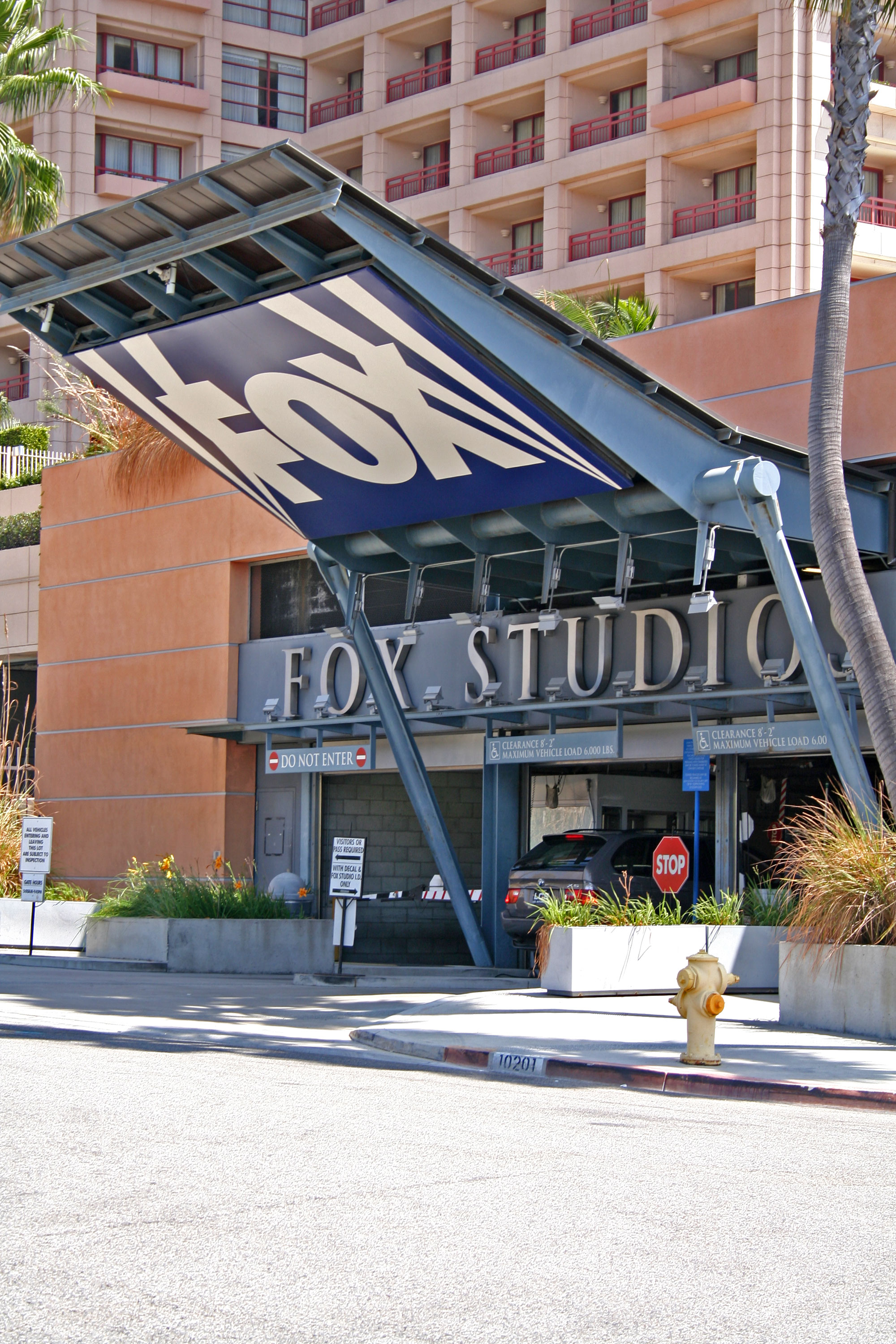
The Fox Broadcasting Company's Los Angeles studios on the Fox Studio Lot in 2005

From 2000 to 2010, 20th Century Fox was the international distributor for MGM/UA releases. In the 1980s, 20th Century Fox – through a joint venture with CBS called CBS/Fox Video – had distributed certain UA films on video; thus UA has come full circle by switching to 20th Century Fox for video distribution. 20th Century Fox also makes money distributing films for small independent film companies.

20th Century Fox's parent News Corporation reincorporated itself as an American company in November 2004, with it having previously been incorporated as an Australian company since its founding. In 2006, 20th Century Fox terminated its production with Bad Hat Harry Productions for five years, because Bryan Singer left X-Men: The Last Stand to direct Superman Returns (2006) for Warner Bros. Pictures, then he returned to produce the first film and direct its sequel in the prequel trilogy, starting in 2011.

In late 2006, Fox Atomic was started up under Fox Searchlight head Peter Rice and COO John Hegeman as a sibling production division under Fox Filmed Entertainment. In early 2008, Atomic's marketing unit was transferred to Fox Searchlight and 20th Century Fox, when Hegeman moved to New Regency Productions. Debbie Liebling became president. After two middling successes and falling short with other films, the unit was shut down in April 2009. The remaining films under its Atomic label in production and post-productions were transferred to 20th Century Fox and Fox Searchlight with Liebling overseeing them.

In 2008, 20th Century Fox announced an Asian subsidiary, Fox STAR Studios, a joint venture with STAR TV, also owned by News Corporation. It was reported that Fox STAR would start by producing films for the Bollywood market, then expand to several Asian markets. In the same year, 20th Century Fox started Fox International Productions, but the division was closed in 2017.

Chernin Entertainment was founded by Peter Chernin after he stepped down as president of 20th Century Fox's then-parent company News Corporation in 2009. Chernin Entertainment's five-year first-look deal for the film and television was signed with 20th Century Fox and 20th Century Fox Television in 2009.

=== 21st Century Fox era ===
On June 28, 2012, Rupert Murdoch announced that News Corporation would be split into two companies: a new News Corporation focused on publishing, and the media-oriented 21st Century Fox, which operated the Fox Entertainment Group and 20th Century Fox. Murdoch considered the name of the new company a way to maintain the 20th Century Fox heritage.

On August 20, 2012, 20th Century Fox entered a five-year distribution agreement with DreamWorks Animation, which began in 2013, after their distribution deal with Paramount Pictures ended with the 2012 release of Rise of the Guardians. DreamWorks Animation's first film to be distributed under the new agreement was The Croods.

Fox Stage Productions was formed in June 2013. In August, the same year, 20th Century Fox started a theatrical joint venture with a trio of producers, both film and theater, Kevin McCollum, John Davis and Tom McGrath.

In June 2014, Rupert Murdoch made a $80 billion bid to acquire Time Warner, 30 years after his original failed bid for its predecessor Warner Communications, which led to him instead acquiring Fox. The planned 2014 acquisition would have merged Warner Bros. Pictures and other assets such as HBO with the assets of 21st Century Fox, in order to achieve greater scale. The bid was rejected by Time Warner's board since they believed it undervalued the company, and by August 2014 Murdoch walked away from the proposed deal.

On September 20, 2017, Locksmith Animation formed a multi-year production deal with 20th Century Fox, who would distribute Locksmith's films under 20th Century Fox Animation, with Locksmith aiming to release a film every 12–18 months. The deal was to bolster Blue Sky's output and replace the loss of distributing DreamWorks Animation films, which are now owned and distributed by Universal Pictures, following its acquisition by NBCUniversal in 2016, after their distribution deal with 20th Century Fox ended with the release of Captain Underpants: The First Epic Movie. The first film to be released under the production company was Ron's Gone Wrong, which was released on October 22, 2021, by 20th Century Studios and was the only film to be released by the studio.

Technoprops, a VFX company that worked on Avatar and The Jungle Book, was purchased in April 2017 to operate as Fox VFX Lab. Technoprops' founder Glenn Derry would continue to run the company as vice president of visual effect reporting to Gerard Bevan and John Kilkenny, VFX president.

On October 30, 2017, Vanessa Morrison was named president of a newly created 20th Century Fox division, Fox Family, reporting to the chairman & CEO and Vice Chairman of 20th Century Fox. The family division would develop films that appeal to younger moviegoers and their parents both animated films and films with live-action elements. Also, the division would oversee the studio's family animated television business, which produces holiday television specials based on existing film properties, and oversee feature film adaptation of its TV shows. To replace Morrison at Fox Animation, Andrea Miloro and Robert Baird were named co-presidents of 20th Century Fox Animation.

20th Century Fox issued a default notice in regards to its licensing agreement for the under-construction 20th Century Fox World theme park in Malaysia by Genting Malaysia Bhd. In November 2018 Genting Malaysia filed suit in response and included soon to be parent the Walt Disney Company.

=== Disney era ===
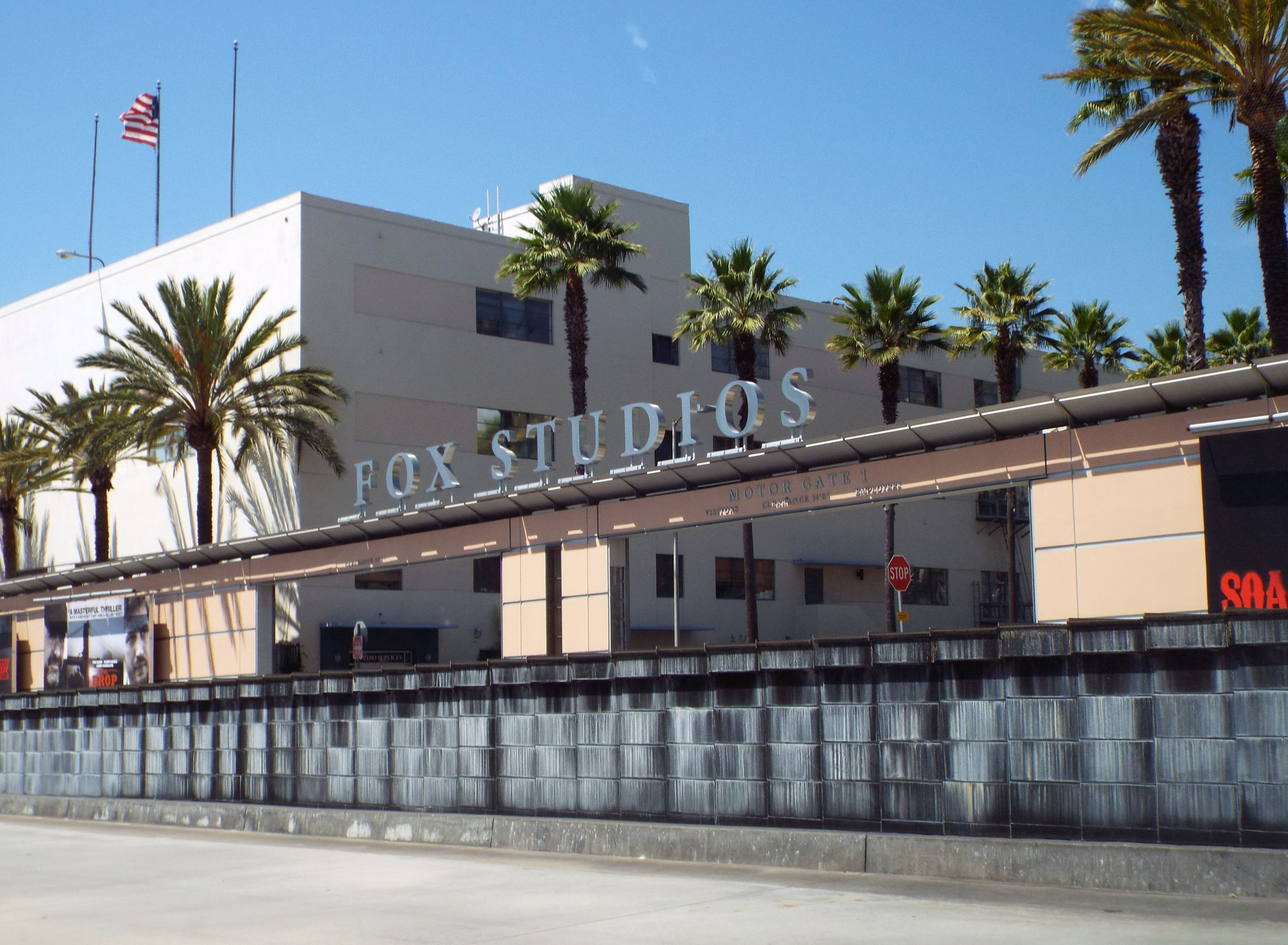
The studio's former home on the Fox Studio Lot in Century City, Los Angeles

On December 14, 2017, Disney announced plans to purchase most of 21st Century Fox, including 20th Century Fox, for $52.4 billion in an all-stock deal. Disney had originally intended to acquire Time Warner rather than 21st Century Fox, but when they reached out to Time Warner in October 2016, they found out that it already had a deal in place with telecommunications company AT&T.

In June 2018, Comcast (owner of NBCUniversal) made an all-cash $65 billion bid for 21st Century Fox. Disney counterbid with $71.3 billion in both stock and cash. On July 19, 2018, Comcast dropped out of the bid for 21st Century Fox in favor of Sky plc and Sky UK. Eight days later, Disney and 21st Century Fox shareholders approved the merger between the two companies. Although the deal was completed on March 20, 2019, 20th Century Fox was not planning to relocate to Walt Disney Studios in Burbank, but retained its headquarters in Century City on the Fox Studio Lot, which leased to Disney by 21st Century Fox's successor, Fox Corporation, for seven years. Various units were moved out from under 20th Century Fox at acquisition in months after the merger along with several rounds of layoffs. The Fox Research Library was folded into the Walt Disney Archives and Walt Disney Imagineering Archives in January 2020. The last film to use the "20th Century Fox" name was Underwater, which was released on January 10, 2020.

After the box office failures of films like Dark Phoenix and Stuber, Disney halted development on several projects, though films such as Free Guy and the Avatar sequels managed to continue production. Fox's slate would be reduced to 10 films per year, half of them being made for the Hulu and then-upcoming Disney+ streaming services. Projects from 20th Century Fox franchises such as Home Alone, Cheaper by the Dozen, Night at the Museum, Diary of a Wimpy Kid, and Ice Age were later announced for Disney+. These projects would later be fully revealed during Disney's Investor Day in December 2020 as feature films for the aforementioned streaming service. The first of these projects was Home Sweet Home Alone, which was released on November 12, 2021.

On January 17, 2020, Disney renamed the studio to "20th Century Studios", which served to help avoid brand confusion with Fox Corporation. Similar to other Disney film units, distribution of 20th Century Studios films is now handled in North America by Walt Disney Studios Motion Pictures and internationally by their sub-division Buena Vista International, while Searchlight Pictures operates their own autonomous distribution and marketing unit. Walt Disney Studios Home Entertainment distributes the films produced by 20th Century and Searchlight in home media under their respective labels. The first film released by Disney under the studio's new name was The Call of the Wild, which was released on February 21, 2020. That same year, Ford vs. Ferrari (2019), among its four Academy Award nominations, earned the studio its first Best Picture nomination post-Disney acquisition.

In the same year, held-over production president Emma Watts left the company. On March 12, 2020, Steve Asbell was named president, production of 20th Century Studios, while Morrison was named president, streaming, Walt Disney Studios Motion Picture Production to oversee live-action development and production of Walt Disney Pictures and 20th Century Studios for Disney+. Philip Steuer will now lead physical and post-production and VFX, as president of production at Walt Disney Studios Motion Picture Production. Randi Hiller will now lead casting as executive VP casting, overseeing both Walt Disney Pictures and 20th Century Studios. Steuer has served as executive VP of physical production for Walt Disney Studios since 2015, and Hiller has led casting for Walt Disney Studios since 2011. Both will dual-report to Asbell and Sean Bailey.

On September 1, 2020, the Japanese branch of 20th Century Studios, 20th Century Fox Japan, was absorbed into Disney Japan; 20th Century Studios' previous involvement with Toei Company as the Japanese co-distributor and Asian distributor for Dragon Ball films ended and were later taken over by Crunchyroll and Sony Pictures Releasing (via Sony Pictures Releasing International) outside of Japan, under license from Toei Animation.

On February 9, 2021, Disney announced that Blue Sky Studios would shut down in April 2021, and that it would be succeeded by 20th Century Animation. A spokesperson for the company explained that this was being done due to the economic situation of the moment.. In addition, production on a film adaptation of the webcomic Nimona, originally scheduled to be released on January 14, 2022, was cancelled as a result of its closure. The studio's film library and intellectual properties are retained by Disney via 20th Century Animation. Although Disney did not give an exact date as to when the studio would be closing down initially, former animator Rick Fournier confirmed on April 10 it was their last day of operation, three days after founder Chris Wedge released a farewell letter on social media. Nimona would be picked up by Annapurna Pictures in early 2022 for release on Netflix in 2023.

A horizontal version of 20th Century Studios' current print logo, used for branding films (mainly Hulu/Star originals produced by them). The first film to use this was Vacation Friends.

On November 22, 2021, Disney Media and Entertainment Distribution and WarnerMedia reached an agreement to allow select 20th Century Studios films be shared between Disney+, Hulu, and HBO Max through late 2022. The new agreement negotiated by Gerard Devan and John Gelke is an amendment to the original agreement between 20th Century Fox and HBO that Disney inherited after its acquisition of Fox in 2019, and as such, is not expected to be renewed. Following the end of the 20th Century-HBO deal, Disney planned to retain the 20th Century films on their own streaming platforms going forward after 2022. The first film to this new strategy was Ron's Gone Wrong. Also in 2021, Disney had launched a video game based-studio 20th Century Games. Similar to its predecessors—FoxNext, Fox Interactive and 20th Century Fox Games—it acts as a distributor and has partnered with other triple-A game studios. Its first title was Aliens: Fireteam Elite.

On February 8, 2022, Steven Spielberg's 2021 film version of West Side Story, among its seven Academy Award nominations, earned 20th Century Studios its first Best Picture nomination post-rebranding.

In March 2023, it was announced that Marvel Comics would be launching a 20th Century Studios imprint, which would release comics based on 20th Century franchises. The first comic under the label would be a Planet of the Apes comic.

On February 26, 2024, Walt Disney Pictures announced the immediate departure of its president, Sean Bailey, with Searchlight Pictures president David Greenbaum assuming his position. Greenbaum would lead Walt Disney Pictures and co-lead 20th Century with Steve Asbell as president.

In April 2025, Disney announced that it would not renew its lease with Fox Corporation and that it would vacate the Fox Studio Lot in Century City at the end of 2025. As a result, 20th Century relocated to the Walt Disney Studios in Burbank.

== Television division ==
20th Television is the television production division of 20th Century Studios. It was known as 20th Century Fox Television until it adopted the 20th Television name in 2020. The 20th Television name was already in use prior to 2020, as the original 20th Television was the studio's television syndication division until it was folded into Disney–ABC Domestic Television in 2020.

During the mid-1950s, feature films were released to television in the hope that they would broaden sponsorship and help the distribution of network programs. Blocks of one-hour programming of feature films to national sponsors on 128 stations were organized by 20th Century Fox and National Telefilm Associates. 20th Century Fox received 50% interest in the NTA Film Network after it sold its library to National Telefilm Associates. This gave 90 minutes of cleared time a week and syndicated feature films (under the package title "Premiere Performance") to 110 non-interconnected stations for sale to national sponsors.

=== Buyout of Four Star ===
Fox bought out the remaining assets of Four Star Television from Ronald Perelman's Compact Video in 1996. The majority of Four Star Television's library of programs are controlled by 20th Television today. After Murdoch's numerous buyouts during the buyout era of the eighties, News Corporation had built up financial debts of $7 billion (much from Sky TV in the UK), despite the many assets that were held by NewsCorp. The high levels of debt caused Murdoch to sell many of the American magazine interests he had acquired in the mid-1980s.

== Music ==
Between 1933 and 1937, a custom record label called Fox Movietone was produced starting at F-100 and running through F-136. It featured songs from 20th Century Fox movies, first using material recorded and issued on Victor's Bluebird label and halfway through switched to material recorded and issued on ARC's dime store labels (Melotone, Perfect, etc.). These scarce records were sold only at Fox Theaters.

The music arm of 20th Century Fox, 20th Century-Fox Records, was founded in 1958. It released soundtracks to Fox films, as well as non-film related albums by artists such as The Alan Parsons Project, Barry White and Maureen McGovern. It would be shut down in 1981 and sold the following year, with the rights to its catalog now being controlled by Universal Music Group.

Fox Records was the 20th Century Fox's music arm since 1992 before being renamed to Fox Music in 2000. It encompasses music publishing and licensing businesses, dealing primarily with Fox Entertainment Group's television and film soundtracks under license by Universal Music Group, EMI, PolyGram, Bertelsmann Music Group, Sony Music, and Warner Music Group. It would also go defunct on January 17, 2020, and was subsequently folded into Hollywood Records. New Regency, which Fox had a 20% stake in beginning in 1997, acquired the label Restless Records in 1997, and it handled soundtracks for Fox/Regency co-productions, including Fight Club and Malcolm in the Middle, in addition to releasing non-soundtrack albums by rock artists. Regency sold the label in 2001.

=== Newman Scoring Stage ===
The Newman Scoring Stage, named after composer Alfred Newman, is a large scoring studio located on the Fox Studio Lot, spanning almost 700 square meters, and is one of the largest music recording spaces in the world. It is also equipped with a 96 Channel AMS Neve 88RS-SP mixing console.

== Radio ==
The Twentieth Century Fox Presents radio series were broadcast between 1936 and 1942. More often than not, the shows were a promotional radio preview featuring a medley of the songs and soundtracks from the latest movie being released into the theaters, much like modern-day movie trailers.

The radio shows featured the original stars, with the announcer narrating a lead-up that encapsulated the performance.

== Motion picture film processing ==
From its earliest ventures into movie production, Fox Film Corporation operated its own processing laboratories. The original lab was located in Fort Lee, New Jersey along with the studios. A lab was included with the new studio built in Los Angeles in 1916. Headed by Alan E. Freedman, the Fort Lee lab was moved into the new Fox Studios building in Manhattan in 1919. In 1932, Freedman bought the labs from Fox for $2,000,000 to bolster what at that time was a failing Fox liquidity. He renamed the operation "DeLuxe Laboratories," which much later became Deluxe Entertainment Services Group. In the 1940s Freedman sold the labs back to what was then 20th Century Fox and remained as president into the 1960s. Under Freedman's leadership, DeLuxe added two more labs in Chicago and Toronto and processed film from studios other than Fox, such as UA and Universal.

== Divisions ==
=== Current ===
- 20th Century Family is an American family-friendly production division of 20th Century Studios. Besides family-friendly theatrical films, the division oversees mixed media (live-action with animation), family animated holiday television specials based on film properties, and film features based on TV shows. On October 30, 2017, Morrison was transferred from her post as president of 20th Century Animation, the prior Fox Family Films, to be president of a newly created 20th Century Fox division, Fox Family, which as a mandate similar to Fox Family Films. The division's president also pick up supervision of a Bob's Burgers film and some existing deals with animation producers done via Gerard Bevan and Andy Watts, including Tonko House. With the sale of 21st Century Fox to Disney in March 2019, rights to The Dam Keeper feature animated film returned to Tonko House. With the August 2019 20th Century Fox slate overhaul announcement, 20th Century Fox properties such as Star Wars, Home Alone, Night at the Museum, Diary of a Wimpy Kid, Cheaper by the Dozen, and the Ice Age spin-off have been assigned for Disney+ release and assigned to 20th Century Family. On March 12, 2020, Morrison was named president, Streaming, Walt Disney Studios Motion Picture Production to oversee live action development and production and 20th Century Studios for Disney+.
- 20th Century Animation is an American animation studio organized as a division of 20th Century Studios, a subsidiary of Walt Disney Studios. Originally formed in 1994 as its subsidiary, it is tasked with producing feature-length films. At one point subsidiaries were Fox Animation Studios until 2000 and Blue Sky Studios until 2021. Its successful films and franchises include Don Bluth's Anastasia, The Simpsons Movie, and Blue Sky's Ice Age and Rio film series.
- 20th Century Games is an American video game licensor that was founded in 2021. Beforehand, Fox and later Disney used the standard 20th Century Fox/Studios brand for licensing video games. Before that, Fox had their own publishing division—Fox Interactive (which was best known for Croc, No One Lives Forever, The Simpsons and Futurama games) which was founded in 1994 and sold to Vivendi Universal Games in March 2003 and later dissolved in 2006.
- 20th Century Comics is a comic publishing company formed in March 2023 in partnership with Marvel Comics. Beforehand, Fox had its own comic division under the now-defunct Fox Atomic brand in collaboration with HarperCollins.

=== Former ===
- Fox 2000 Pictures was an American sister studio of the larger film studios 20th Century Fox and Fox Searchlight Pictures specializing in producing independent films in mid-range releases that largely targeted mid-ranged groups. The company dissolved in May 2021 following the release of The Woman in the Window on Netflix, and the acquisition of 21st Century Fox by Disney in March 2019. Its successful films include Marley & Me, Life of Pi, The Fault in Our Stars, Love, Simon, Fight Club, and both Alvin and the Chipmunks and Diary of a Wimpy Kid film series.
- 20th Digital Studio was an American web series and web films production and distribution company, founded in 2008 as a digital media, and is a subsidiary of 20th Century Studios. The division was dissolved in April 2023.
- Fox Studios was a former group of three major movie studios, each part of the defunct Fox Entertainment Group. The three film studios were Fox Studios Australia in Sydney, Australia, Fox Studios Baja in Lower California and the oldest studio, Fox Studio Lot in Century City, home of 20th Century Fox. Disney continues to own Fox Studios Australia, now known as Disney Studios Australia. Fox Entertainment Group sold off the Baja Studios in 2007, and the Century City studios lot were retained by Fox Corporation, although Disney remains a major tenant at the facility.
- Fox VFX Lab was a former visual effects company division of 20th Century Fox that was acquired in 2017 known as Technoprops. It is led by president John Kilkenny. Besides their visual effects activities, the division oversaw different parts of the world to apply for and work on projects that include films such as Avatar, Rise of the Planet of the Apes, Alita: Battle Angel, The Jungle Book, Rogue One, Teenage Mutant Ninja Turtles: Out of the Shadows, Doctor Strange, and Warcraft and also video game properties like Need for Speed (2015), Battlefield 1, Rainbow Six Siege, Watch Dogs 2, Just Cause 3, Rise of the Tomb Raider, Assassin's Creed Syndicate, Mafia III, Halo 4, Street Fighter V, Call of Duty (Call of Duty: Advanced Warfare and Black Ops III), Far Cry (Far Cry 5 and Primal), Mortal Kombat (X and 11), and Sonic the Hedgehog (Forces and Team Sonic Racing). In 2020, Disney merged Fox VFX Lab into Lucasfilm's Industrial Light & Magic, using the Technoprops brand for the labs technology division, the majority of employees and executives were reportedly fired.
- Fox Atomic is a former youth-focused film production company and division of Fox Filmed Entertainment that operated from 2006 to April 2009. Atomic was originally paired with either 20th Century Fox or its Fox Searchlight division under their same, respective leadership. In late 2006, Fox Atomic was started up under Fox Searchlight head Peter Rice and COO John Hegeman as a sibling production division under Fox Filmed Entertainment. Debbie Liebling transferred to Fox Atomic in 2007 from Fox. In January 2008, Atomic's marketing unit was transferred to Fox Searchlight and 20th Century Fox, when Hegeman moved to Regency Enterprises. Debbie Liebling became president. After two middling successes and falling short with other films, the unit was shut down in April 2009. The remaining films under Atomic in production and post-productions were transferred to 20th Century Fox and Fox Searchlight with Liebling overseeing them.
- Fox Faith is a former evangelical Christian-based film production company and division of Fox Filmed Entertainment that operated from 2006 to 2010. In addition to being paired with 20th Century Fox and Fox Searchlight, it was also paired with Fox's home video division, though has had theatrical limited release agreements with AMC Theatres and Carmike Theatres chains. Fox Faith was considered from the studio as "morally-driven, family-friendly programming," and requires them to "have overt Christian content or be derived from the work of a Christian author." Its final film, Mama, I Want to Sing!, was filmed in 2009, but was shelved until 2012 due to the studio's closure.
- 20th Century Fox Consumer Products (also known as Fox Consumer Products) is a former American merchandising company founded in 1995 and is 20th Century Fox's merchandise division. In 2019, 20th Century Fox Consumer Products was folded into Disney Consumer Products. TCFCP is the management of the rights derived from films and television series produced by the group. it used to license and market properties worldwide on behalf of 20th Century Fox, 20th Century Fox Television and FX Networks, as well as third party lines. The division was aligned with 20th Century Fox Television, the flagship studio leading the industry in supplying award-winning and blockbuster primetime television programming and entertainment content and 20th Century Fox, one of the world's largest producers and distributors of motion pictures throughout the world. 20th Century Fox Consumer Products engaged in merchandising of the Fox brand and Fox properties.
- Fox Stage Productions is the former Broadway-style music show branch founded in June 2013 by the 21st Century Fox conglomerate. after the acquisition in 2019, Fox Stage Productions was rebranded as Buena Vista Theatrical on July 3, 2019.
- Fox International Productions is the former division of 20th Century Fox (now 20th Century Studios) in charge of local production in 12 territories in China, Europe, India and Latin America from 2008 to 2017. In 2008, 20th Century Fox started Fox International Productions under president Sanford Panitch. The company had $900 million in box-office receipts by the time Panitch left the company for Sony Pictures on June 2, 2015. Co-president of worldwide theatrical marketing and distribution for 20th Century Fox Tomas Jegeus was named president of Fox International Productions effective September 1, 2015. The company struck a development and production deal in November 2015 with Zhejiang Huace, a Chinese entertainment group. In December 2017, 20th Century Fox film chairman-CEO Stacey Snider indicated that Fox International Productions would be dissolved in favor of each local and regional offices producing or acquiring projects.
- 20th Century Fox International is the former international division of 20th Century Fox, responsible for the distribution of films outside the United States and indirectly for the distribution of home videos and DVDs.
- Fox-Paramount Home Entertainment is a former Nordic joint venture between 20th Century Fox Home Entertainment and Paramount Home Entertainment, founded in 2013 to manage manufacturing, distribution, marketing, and sales of each studio's Blu-ray and DVD releases, as well as sales support for digital products in the Nordic region. In 2020, following the renaming for and folding of 20th Century Fox Home Entertainment (now 20th Century Home Entertainment), Fox-Paramount Home Entertainment was defunct and separated. Now home media releases for 20th Century Studios' films in Nordic are directly managed by Walt Disney Studios Home Entertainment, while SF Studios only releasing its own films from Paramount Pictures since July 2021.

== Logo and fanfare ==
The 20th Century-Fox production logo and fanfare (as seen in 1947)

The 20th Century Fox production logo and fanfare originated as the logo of Twentieth Century Pictures and was adopted by 20th Century-Fox after the merger in 1935. It consists of a stacked block-letter three-dimensional, monolithic logotype (nicknamed "the Monument") surrounded by Art deco buildings and illuminated by searchlights. In the production logo that appears at the start of films, the searchlights are animated and the sequence is accompanied by a distinctive fanfare that was originally composed in 1933 by Alfred Newman. The original layout of the logo was designed by special effects animator and matte painting artist Emil Kosa Jr.

In 1953, Rocky Longo, an artist at Pacific Title, was hired to recreate the original logo design for the new CinemaScope picture process. Longo tilted the "0" in "20th" to have the logo maintain proportions in the wider CinemaScope format. Alfred Newman also composed an extended version of the logo's fanfare to be heard during the CinemaScope logo that would follow after the Fox logo. Although the format had since declined, director George Lucas specifically requested that the CinemaScope version of the fanfare be used for the opening titles of Star Wars (1977). Additionally, the film's main theme was composed by John Williams in the same key as the fanfare (B♭ major), serving as an extension to it of sorts. In 1981, the logo was altered with the re-straightening of the "0" in "20th".

In 1994, after a few failed attempts, Fox in-house television producer Kevin Burns was hired to produce a new logo for the company, this time using the then-new process of computer-generated imagery (CGI) adding more detail and animation, with the longer 21-second Fox fanfare arranged by Bruce Broughton used as the underscore, and a byline reading "A NEWS CORPORATION COMPANY". It would later be re-recorded by David Newman in 1997 and again in 1998.

In 2009, an updated logo created by Blue Sky Studios (a prototype version of the 2009 structure exists) debuted with the release of Avatar. In 2013, the News Corporation byline was removed.

On September 16, 2014, 20th Century Fox posted a video showcasing all of the various versions of the logo, plus the "William Fox Presents" version of the Fox Film logo and the 20th Century Pictures logo, including some variations, up until the 2009 version of the logo, with the 1998 re-arrangement version of the 1997 version of the fanfare composed by David Newman, to promote the new Fox Movies website.

On January 17, 2020, it was reported that Disney had begun to phase out the "Fox" name from the studio's branding as it is no longer tied to the current Fox Corporation, with 20th Century Fox and Fox Searchlight Pictures respectively renamed to 20th Century Studios and Searchlight Pictures. Branding elements associated with the studio, including the searchlights, monolith, and fanfare, will remain in use. The first film that carries the new 20th Century Studios name is The Call of the Wild (coincidentally the original film adaptation was the original Twentieth Century Pictures' final movie before its merger with Fox Film).

The 20th Century Studios logo and fanfare in use since the studio's re-branding in 2020.

For the 20th Century Studios logo, its print logo debuted on a movie poster of The New Mutants while the on-screen logo debuted in a television advertisement for and the full version debuted on February 21, 2020, with the film The Call of the Wild.

In 2020, 20th Century Studios logo was animated by Picturemill (the prototype version of the 2020 structure and the 2021 structure with the 2009 sky background exists and appeared in some of Picturemill's reels), while MOCEAN animated Searchlight Pictures logo, based on Blue Sky Studios' animation. It features a different sky backdrop, the Los Angeles skyline is larger and more detailed, and the rest of the structure appears darker with more realistic lighting.

Gallery
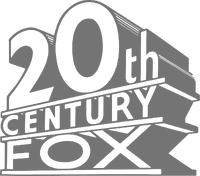
Logo used in 1935

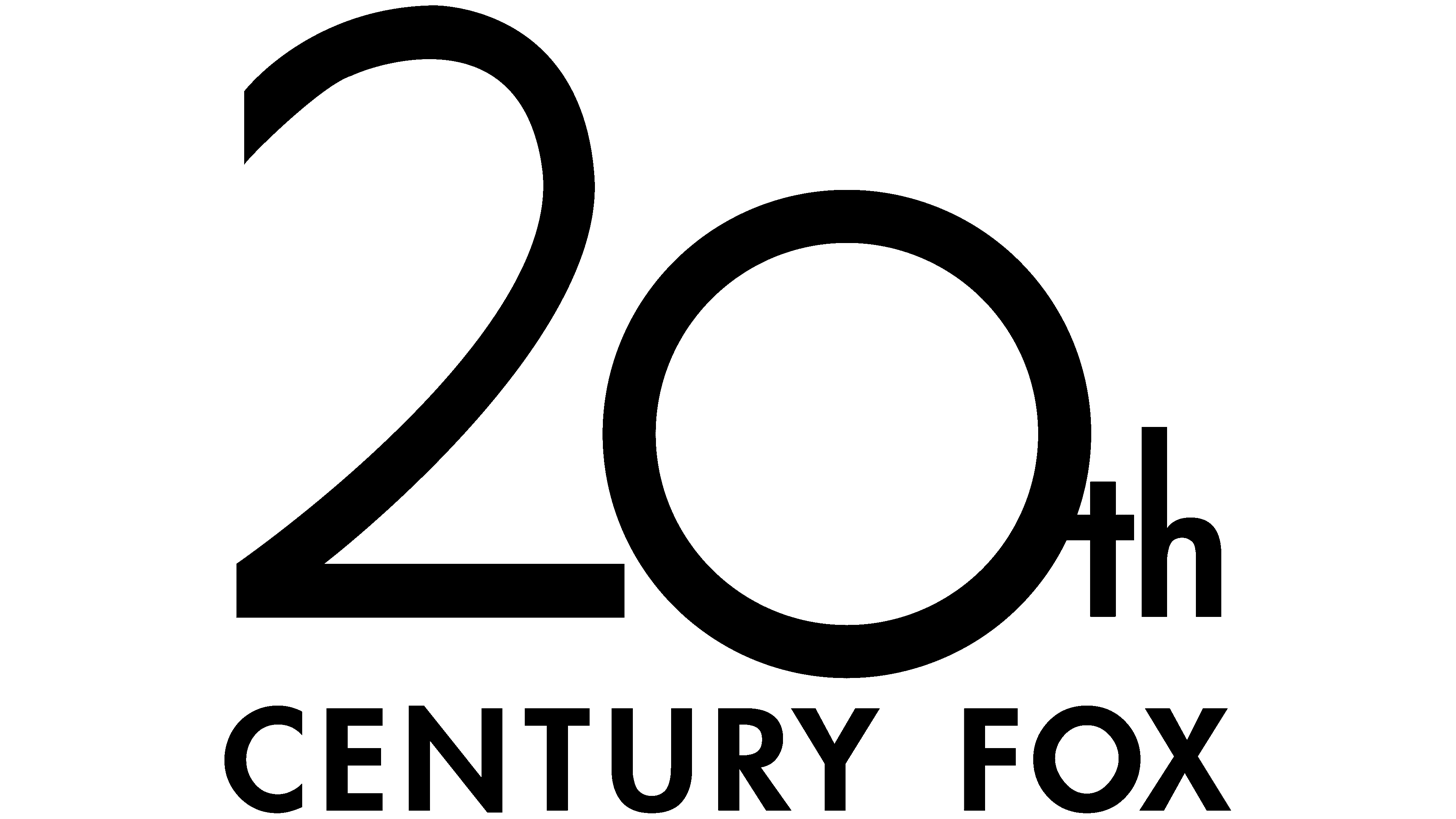
Logo used in 1943

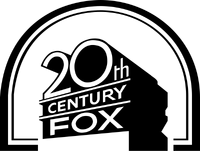
Logo used in 1972

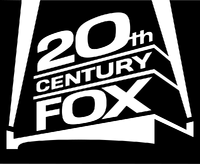
Logo used in 1982

Logo used from 1985

== Film library ==
=== Film series ===
Title	Release date	Notes
Charlie Chan	1929–1942	
State Fair	1933–1962	
Terry-Toons	1935–1973	Co-production with Terrytoons for theatrical cartoon shorts
My Friend Flicka	1943–2012	Co-production with Fox 2000 Pictures and Dune Entertainment
Anna and the King of Siam	1946–1999	Co-production with Fox 2000 Pictures and Lawrence Bender Productions
Cheaper by the Dozen	1950–2022	Co-production with Dune Entertainment, Robert Simonds, 21 Laps Entertainment, Khalabo Ink Society, and Walt Disney Pictures (2022)
The Fly	1958–present	Co-production with Associated Producers Inc, Lippert Films, and Brooksfilm
Derek Flint	1966–1976	
Dr. Dolittle	1967–2009	Co-production with APJAC Productions, Davis Entertainment, Eddie Murphy Productions, and Friendly Films
Planet of the Apes	1968–present	Co-production with APJAC Productions, The Zanuck Company, Tim Burton Productions, Chernin Entertainment, 6th & Idaho and Dune Entertainment
The French Connection	1971–1986	Co-production with Philip D'Antoni Productions, Schine-Moore Productions
The Omen	1976–present	Co-production with Dune Entertainment, Mace Neufeld Productions, and Harvey Bernhard Productions
Star Wars	1977–2005	Co-production with Lucasfilm
Candy Candy	1977–1992	International distribution only; co-production with Toei Animation and Toei Company
Alien	1979–present	Co-production with Brandywine Productions, Scott Free Productions and Dune Entertainment
Porky's	1981–2009	Co-production with Astral Films
Romancing the Stone	1984–1985	Co-production with The Stone Group
Revenge of the Nerds	1984–1994	Co-production with Interscope Communications
Cocoon	1985–1988	Co-production with Imagine Entertainment and The Zanuck Company
Mannequin	1987–1991	Co-production with Gladden Entertainment
Predator	1987–present	Co-production with Silver Pictures, Gordon Company, Davis Entertainment, Dune Entertainment, Troublemaker Studios and The Third Floor, Inc.
Wall Street	1987–2010	Co-production with Dune Entertainment and Edward Pressman Productions
Die Hard	1988–2013	Co-production with The Mark Gordon Company, Silver Pictures, Cinergi Pictures, Dune Entertainment, Cheyenne Enterprises, Giant Pictures, and Temple Hill Entertainment
Young Guns	1988–1990	Co-production with Morgan Creek Productions
Alien Nation	1988–1997	Co-production with American Entertainment Partners
Home Alone	1990–present	Co-production with Hughes Entertainment
Hot Shots!	1991–1993	Co-production with Jim Abrahams Productions
FernGully	1992–1998	Co-production with FAI Films, Youngheart Productions, CBS/Fox Video, Kroyer Films, and FAI Films
The Sandlot	1993–2007	Co-production with Island World
Speed	1994–1997	Co-production with The Mark Gordon Company and Blue Tulip Productions
Power Rangers	1995–1997	Co-production with Fox Family Films, Saban Entertainment, and Toei Company
Independence Day	1996–2016	Co-production with Centropolis Entertainment and Electric Entertainment
Casper the Friendly Ghost	1997–1998	Co-production with The Harvey Entertainment Company, Saban Entertainment, and Brookwell McNamara Entertainment
Anastasia	1997–present	Co-production with 20th Century Animation and Fox Animation Studios
The Wiggles	1997–2007	From The Wiggles Movie to Racing to the Rainbow; produced by Gladusaurus Productions and The Wiggles Pty Ltd
Big Momma's House	2000–2011	Co-production with Regency Enterprises, Runteldat Entertainment, and Dune Entertainment
X-Men	2000–2020	Co-production with Bad Hat Harry Productions, The Donners' Company, Genre Films, Marvel Entertainment and Dune Entertainment
24	2001–2017	Co-production with Imagine Entertainment
Joy Ride	2001–2014	Co-production with Regency Enterprises, Bad Robot, and LivePlanet
Behind Enemy Lines	2001–2014	Co-production with Davis Entertainment
Super Troopers	2001–present	Co-production with Searchlight Pictures and Broken Lizard
Ice Age	2002–present	Co-production with 20th Century Animation and Blue Sky Studios
The Transporter	2002–2015	US distribution only (except for the third which was distributed by Lionsgate); produced and released elsewhere by EuropaCorp
Drumline	2002–2014	Co-production with N'Credible Entertainment, Wendy Finerman Productions, and Fox 2000 Pictures
28 Days Later	2002–2007	distribution only; produced by DNA Films, Film Council, Fox Atomic, Figment Films, Sogecine, and Koan Films
Wrong Turn	2003–2014	US distribution only; co-production with Regency Enterprises; produced and released elsewhere by Constantin Film and Summit Entertainment
Garfield	2004–2009	Co-production with Davis Entertainment, Dune Entertainment, and Paws, Inc.
Alien vs Predator	2004–2007	Co-production with Davis Entertainment, Gordon Company, Brandywine Productions, Dark Horse Entertainment, Impact Pictures, Stillking Films, and Dune Entertainment
Fantastic Four	2005–present	Co-production with 1492 Pictures, Constantin Film, Genre Films and Marvel Entertainment; Studio credit and Copyright Holder (2025)
The Devil Wears Prada	2006–2026	Co-production with Fox 2000 Pictures and Wendy Finerman Productions
The Hills Have Eyes	2006–2007	Co-production with Dune Entertainment and Craven/Maddalena Films
The Marine	2006–2018	Co-production with Dune Entertainment and WWE Studios
Night at the Museum	2006–present	Co-production with 21 Laps Entertainment, 1492 Pictures, Walt Disney Pictures, Atomic Cartoons and Alibaba Pictures
The Simpsons	2007–present	Co-production with Gracie Films and 20th Century Animation
Hitman	2007–2015	US distribution only; produced and released elsewhere by EuropaCorp; co-production with Eidos Interactive, IO Interactive, and Square Enix
Alvin and the Chipmunks	2007–2015	Co-production with Fox 2000 Pictures, Dune Entertainment, Regency Enterprises and Bagdasarian Productions
Space Chimps	2008–2010	US distribution only; co-production with Vanguard Animation
Mirrors	2008–2010	Co-production with Dune Entertainment and Regency Enterprises
Street Kings	2008–2011	Co-production with Dune Entertainment and 3 Arts Entertainment
Marley & Me	2008–2011	Co-production with Dune Entertainment and Regency Enterprises
Taken	2009–2015 (US only), 2008-2014 (elsewhere)	US distribution only; produced and released elsewhere by EuropaCorp
12 Rounds	2009–2015	Co-production with Dune Entertainment and WWE Studios
Dragon Ball	2009–2018	Co-production with Dune Entertainment, Toei Company, Star Overseas, Big Screen Productions, and Funimation; Dragon Ball movies (excluding Battle of Gods, Resurrection 'F' & Broly) are now distributed by Sony Pictures
Avatar	2009–present	Co-production with Lightstorm Entertainment
Wolverine	2009–2017	Co-production with Dune Entertainment, Genre Films, Marvel Entertainment, and Seed Productions
Tooth Fairy	2010–2013	Co-production with Dune Entertainment, Walden Media, Blumhouse Productions, and WWE Studios
Percy Jackson	2010–2013	Co-production with Dune Entertainment and 1492 Pictures
Diary of a Wimpy Kid	2010–present	Co-production with Fox 2000 Pictures, Dune Entertainment, Color Force, Walt Disney Pictures, 20th Century Animation, and Bardel Entertainment
Rio	2011–present	Co-production with 20th Century Animation and Blue Sky Studios
Maze Runner	2014–2018	Co-production with Oddball Entertainment, Gotham Group, and Temple Hill Entertainment
Kingsman	2014–2021	Co-production with Genre Films, and Marv Films
Deadpool	2016–2024	Co-production with Maximum Effort, Genre Films, and Marvel Entertainment Studio credit only (2024)
Hercule Poirot	2017–2023	Co-production with Genre Films, Scott Free Productions, and The Mark Gordon Company
Vacation Friends	2021–2023	Co-production with Hulu and Broken Road Productions
Brahmastra (Astraverse)	2022–present	Co-production with Star Studios, Dharma Productions, Prime Focus, Starlight Pictures, and Walt Disney Studios Motion Pictures
Hellraiser	2022–present	Co-production with Hulu, Spyglass Media Group, Phantom Four Films, and Disney Platform Distribution

=== Highest-grossing films ===
Highest-grossing films in North America
Rank	Title	Year	Gross
1	Avatar ‡	2009	$785,221,649
2	Avatar: The Way of Water	2022	$688,459,501
3	Titanic‡	1997	$674,292,608
4	Deadpool & Wolverine	2024	$636,745,858
5	Star Wars: Episode I – The Phantom Menace ‡	1999	$487,576,624
6	Star Wars ‡	1977	$460,998,007
7	Star Wars: Episode III – Revenge of the Sith ‡	2005	$414,378,291
8	Avatar: Fire and Ash	2025	$404,331,134
9	Deadpool	2016	$363,070,709
10	Deadpool 2	2018	$324,535,803
11	Return of the Jedi ‡	1983	$315,476,701
12	Star Wars: Episode II – Attack of the Clones	2002	$310,676,740
13	Independence Day	1996	$306,169,268
14	The Empire Strikes Back ‡	1980	$290,475,067
15	Home Alone	1990	$285,761,243
16	Night at the Museum	2006	$250,863,268
17	X-Men: The Last Stand	2006	$234,362,462
18	X-Men: Days of Future Past	2014	$233,921,534
19	Cast Away	2000	$233,632,142
20	The Martian	2015	$228,433,663
21	Logan	2017	$226,277,068
22	The Devil Wears Prada 2	2026	$220,525,976
23	Alvin and the Chipmunks: The Squeakquel	2009	$219,614,612
24	Mrs Doubtfire	1993	$219,195,243
25	Alvin and the Chipmunks	2007	$217,326,974

Highest-grossing films worldwide
Rank	Title	Year	Gross
1	Avatar ‡	2009	$2,923,710,708
2	Avatar: The Way of Water	2022	$2,334,484,620
3	Titanic ‡	1997	$2,256,003,352
4	Avatar: Fire and Ash	2025	$1,490,386,712
5	Deadpool & Wolverine	2024	$1,338,073,645
6	Star Wars: Episode I – The Phantom Menace ‡	1999	$1,046,515,409
7	Star Wars: Episode III – Revenge of the Sith ‡	2005	$905,204,578
8	Bohemian Rhapsody	2018	$903,655,259
9	Ice Age: Dawn of the Dinosaurs	2009	$886,686,817
10	Ice Age: Continental Drift	2012	$877,244,782
11	Independence Day	1996	$817,400,891
12	Deadpool 2	2018	$785,046,920
13	Deadpool	2016	$783,112,979
14	Star Wars ‡	1977	$775,398,007
15	X-Men: Days of Future Past	2014	$747,862,775
16	Dawn of the Planet of the Apes	2014	$710,644,566
17	The Devil Wears Prada 2	2026	$689,501,075
18	Ice Age: The Meltdown ‡	2006	$660,940,780
19	Star Wars: Episode II – Attack of the Clones	2002	$649,398,328
20	The Martian	2015	$630,161,890
21	How to Train Your Dragon 2	2014	$621,537,519
22	Logan	2017	$616,225,934
23	Life of Pi	2012	$609,016,565
24	The Croods	2013	$587,204,668
25	Night at the Museum	2006	$574,480,841

‡ — Includes theatrical reissue(s)

== See also ==
- 20th Century Animation
- 20th Century Family
- Searchlight Pictures
- Star Studio18
- 20th Television
- 20th Television Animation
