= Michelle Federer =

American actress

- Born: Michelle Lin Federer
- Education: Ithaca College (BFA)
- Occupation: Actress
- Years active: 2000–present
- Spouse: Norbert Leo Butz (m. 2007)
- Children: 1

Michelle Lin Federer Butz (née Federer) is an American actress.

== Early life and education ==
Federer is the daughter of John and Claudia Federer. She grew up in Shaker Heights, Ohio, where she was a student of the Shaker Heights High School Theatre Arts Department under the direction of James Thornton, and she gained early experience working in the University School Theater Program, where she first worked and became friends with future Wicked castmate Michael Seelbach. Federer's father was a math teacher in the Shaker Heights Public School System teaching at Byron Junior High School (now Shaker Heights Middle School) and currently teaches at the Mandel Jewish Day School. As a teen, Federer attended Stagedoor Manor Performing Arts Camp, located in Loch Sheldrake, New York. She graduated from Ithaca College, located in Ithaca, New York, with a Bachelor of Fine Arts degree in musical theatre.

== Career ==
=== Theatre ===
She understudied the role of Adele Rice in the 2002 Off-Broadway production of A Man of No Importance at Lincoln Center.

In February 2003, she played the role of Thelma in the Hartford Stage (Hartford, Connecticut) production of The Trip to Bountiful.

She made her Broadway debut as Nessarose in Wicked, a character she originated. Following a San Francisco tryout, the show opened October 30, 2003, starring Kristin Chenoweth and Idina Menzel, with music and lyrics by Stephen Schwartz. Federer, the longest-running original principal cast member, left the production on January 8, 2006, and was succeeded by her understudy Cristy Candler. Federer can be heard on the Wicked cast recording.

She was the understudy for Julia Roberts in the roles of Nan and Lina in the play Three Days of Rain, which ran on Broadway from March 26, 2006 (previews) to June 18, 2006.

She appeared as Allison in the Atlantic Theatre Company's Off-Broadway production of Anon by Kate Robins in January to February 2007.

On October 27, 2008, Federer took part in The Yellow Brick Road Not Taken, a fifth anniversary concert featuring a selection of scenes and songs cut from early drafts of Wicked. The concert starred former co-stars Shoshana Bean and Jennifer Laura Thompson.

Federer returned to the role of Nessarose in Broadway's Wicked with performances beginning August 18, 2009, this time replacing Candler. She ended her return engagement on January 10, 2010, and was replaced by Jenny Fellner.

She appeared in The Cottage by Sandy Rustin at the Queens Theatre, Flushing Meadows Corona Park, Queens, New York in 2014.

=== Television and film ===
Federer has also appeared in various small film roles, including the biographical film Kinsey (2004) and independent romance film Flannel Pajamas (2006).

Federer appeared in a recurring role on NBC's Smash in which she plays Monica Swift, the wife of Michael (Will Chase) who has an affair with Debra Messing's character Julia. The series also stars Megan Hilty, who starred on Broadway alongside Federer in Wicked. Smash premiered in the United States on February 6, 2012.

== Personal life ==
Federer married her former Wicked co-star, Norbert Leo Butz in 2007. Their daughter was born on January 2, 2011.

== Filmography ==
=== Film ===
Year	Title	Role	Notes
2000	Overnight Sensation	Jackie Cartwright	
2004	Kinsey	Gall Wasp Class Coed	
2006	Flannel Pajamas	Tara	
2008	Rachel Getting Married	12-Step Reader	
2022	Better Nate Than Ever	Sherrie Foster	

=== Television ===
Year	Title	Role	Notes
2005	Law & Order: Criminal Intent	Allison Jenkins	Episode: "Gone"
2009	Wainy Days	Jeannie	2 episodes
2012	Smash	Monica Swift	4 episodes
2012	Elementary	Ellie Wilson	Episode: "Flight Risk"
2016	Blue Bloods	Erika Ramus	Episode: "Friends in Need"
2017	The Defenders	Michelle Raymond	3 episodes
2018–2021	New Amsterdam	Millie Tamberlay	5 episodes
2021	Hit & Run	Jenny Sharon	2 episodes
2022	Archive 81	Evie Crest	Episode: "Spirit Receivers"
