= 20th Century Family =

Division of 20th Century Studios

- Formerly: Fox Family (2017–2020)
- Type: Division
- Industry: Film
- Founded: 2017; 9 years ago
- Headquarters: Walt Disney Studios, Burbank, California, United States
- Area served: Worldwide
- Parent: 20th Century Studios
- Website: family.20thcenturystudios.com

20th Century Family (also known as 20th Century Studios Family; formerly known as Fox Family or 20th Century Fox Family) is a division of 20th Century Studios founded in 2017 which produces family-friendly films and television programs. Besides theatrical films, the division oversees mixed media (live-action with animation), family animated holiday television specials based on film properties, and feature films based on television shows.

The division is in charge of such franchises as Ice Age, Rio, Night at the Museum, Diary of a Wimpy Kid, Anastasia, and Home Alone.

== Background ==
Before Fox started its family division, 20th Century Animation was known as Fox Family Films, as one of four film divisions of 20th Century Fox under executive John Matoian. The division was planned to produce six feature films a year as part of a plan to produce more films per year overall. Fox senior vice president of production Chris Meledandri was transferred into the unit as executive vice president in March 1994 after having been hired the previous year. The week of May 6, 1994, Fox Family announced the hiring of Don Bluth and Gary Goldman for a new $100 million animation studio which began construction that year in Phoenix, Arizona. In three years, the animation studio would produce and release its first film, Anastasia. In September 1994, Matoian was promoted by Rupert Murdoch to head up the Fox network. Meledandri was selected to head up the unit in 1994.

It produced live-action films such as Mighty Morphin Power Rangers: The Movie (1995), Dunston Checks In (1996) and Home Alone 3. By August 1997, Fox Family had decreased the number of live-action films. R.L. Stine agreed with Fox Family Films in January 1998 for a film adaptation of the Goosebumps book franchise with Tim Burton producing, but it never came to fruition.

After the success of Anastasia, Fox Family Films was renamed to Fox Animation Studios, later 20th Century Fox Animation, and simply 20th Century Animation.

== History ==
On October 30, 2017, Morrison was transferred from her post as president of 20th Century Fox Animation, the prior Fox Family Films, to be president of a newly created 20th Century Fox division, Fox Family, which as a mandate similar to Fox Family Films. During this time, the president of the division also picked up supervision of a Bob's Burgers film and some existing deals with animation producers, including Tonko House. With the sale of 21st Century Fox to Disney in March 2019, rights to The Dam Keeper feature animated film returned to Tonko House.

After the Disney acquisition in 2019, the company was renamed to 20th Century Family in 2020 to avoid confusion with Fox Corporation. On March 12, 2020, Morrison was named president, Streaming, Walt Disney Studios Motion Picture Production to oversee live action development and production of Walt Disney Pictures and 20th Century Studios for Disney+. Lisa Fragner, who would later become Vice-President of Development at Disney Television Animation, secured the rights to adapt the 2013 book, Better Nate Than Ever, as a feature film to be developed under the division.

In April 2025, Disney announced that it would not renew its lease with Fox Corporation and that it would leave the Fox Studio Lot business in Century City at the end of 2025. As a result, 20th Century Family relocated to the Walt Disney Studios in Burbank.

== Filmography ==
=== Released films ===
#	Title	Release date	Ref(s)	Co-production with
1	Home Sweet Home Alone	December 11, 2021		20th Century Studios, Hutch Parker Entertainment
2	Better Nate Than Ever	April 1, 2022		Walt Disney Pictures (Note: The film was originally produced by 20th Century Studios, but was released under Walt Disney Pictures.), Marc Platt Productions
