= 2009 South Park attacks =

Murder and rape case in Washington

- Location: South Park, Seattle, Washington, U.S.
- Date: July 19, 2009
- Attack type: Murder; rape; stabbing
- Deaths: 1
- Injuries: 1
- Verdict: Guilty
- Convictions: Aggravated murder; attempted first-degree murder; first-degree rape; first-degree burglary
- Convicted: Isaiah Kalebu (life imprisonment without the possibility of parole)

On July 19, 2009, Isaiah Kalebu broke into the house of Teresa Butz and Jennifer Hopper in South Park, Seattle and raped and stabbed them. Butz died from her injuries while Hopper lived. Kalebu was found guilty of aggravated murder, attempted murder, and rape, and was sentenced to life imprisonment without the possibility of parole. The case is the subject of the 2012 Pulitzer Prize for Feature Writing work, The Bravest Woman in Seattle.

== Background ==
=== Victims ===
Teresa Butz (October 1969 – July 19, 2009) was originally from St. Louis, Missouri, and had 10 siblings, including actor Norbert Leo Butz. She studied at the University of Missouri–St. Louis, where she graduated with a degree in business. She moved to Seattle in the 1990s.

She was in a same-sex relationship with Jennifer Hopper. The couple were planning to get married and scheduled a trip to Barcelona for Butz's 40th birthday in October.

=== Perpetrator ===
Isaiah Kalebu was 23 years old at the time of the attacks and had a history of mental illness. He was previously charged with felony harassment after he made threats of killing his mother. Judge Brian Gain let Kalebu out on no bail in August 2008. Six days prior to the attacks, a prosecutor suggested that Kalebu be imprisoned again due to him being a suspect in an arson attack; Gain rejected the request. He did not know Butz or Hopper prior to attacking them.

== Attack ==
On July 19, 2009, Isaiah Kalebu entered the house of Teresa Butz, 39, and Jennifer Hopper, 36 in South Park, Seattle, through an open bathroom window. He raped and cut the women for two hours. He told them he would not harm them if they complied, which was false.

Butz threw a table at the window, breaking it, and jumped out and onto the street to seek help at around 3:00 am. She died on the street, covered in blood. Hopper was hospitalized at the Harborview Medical Center.

== Arrest and trial ==
Police released surveillance footage of Kalebu committing an unrelated burglary with his dog in an attempt to locate him. A bus driver saw him with the dog and called the police at Magnuson Park. Isaiah Kalebu was arrested on July 24, 2009, and he was positively connected to the crime through DNA evidence left behind.

Kalebu was charged with aggravated murder, attempted murder, rape, and burglary. His bail was set at $10 million. The trial was postponed once due to Kalebu's suicide attempt. During the trial, Kalebu was restrained to a chair, cursed Judge Michael Hayden, and made homophobic comments.

On August 12, 2011, Kalebu was sentenced to life imprisonment without the possibility of parole for the aggravated murder of Butz and the attempted first-degree murder and first-degree rape of Hopper. He was also found guilty for first-degree burglary. He is imprisoned in Clallam Bay Corrections Center.

== In media ==
- Eli Sanders won the 2012 Pulitzer Prize for Feature Writing for the work The Bravest Woman in Seattle, about Hopper and the attacks.
- Sanders's book While the City Slept is about Kalebu and the lead-up to the attacks.
