= FernGully 2: The Magical Rescue =

- VHS cover art
- Directed by: Phil Robinson; Co-director: Dave Marshall
- Written by: Chris Fink; Richard Tulloch
- Produced by: Jeff Fino; Holly Harold
- Starring: Laura Erlich; Harry Joseph; Gary Martin; Matt K. Miller; Digory Oaks; Westin Peace
- Edited by: Michael Cavanaugh
- Music by: Nerida Tyson-Chew
- Production companies: FAI Films; Rosen Harper Entertainment; Wild Brain Productions (Note: Animation outsourced to Wang Film Productions.)
- Distributed by: 20th Century Fox Home Entertainment
- Release date: March 17, 1998
- Running time: 72 minutes
- Country: United States
- Language: English

FernGully 2: The Magical Rescue is a 1998 American animated fantasy adventure film, a direct-to-video sequel to FernGully: The Last Rainforest (1992). Produced by Wild Brain Productions and distributed by 20th Century Fox Home Entertainment, the film was directed by Phil Robinson and Dave Marshall, and written by Chris Fink and Richard Tulloch. None of the original actors reprise their roles; the film features a new voice cast, including Laura Erlich, Harry Joseph, Gary Martin, Matt K. Miller, Digory Oaks, and Westin Peace. It received a primarily negative response from critics.

== Plot ==
Crysta is taking care of three baby animals and demonstrating greater control over nature. She and Pips begin a small contest over who can grow the more impressive plant, while Pips expresses a desire to see more of the outside world.

Suddenly, Batty Koda arrives in a panic, warning that human poachers are right behind him. These poachers show up with their dogs and capture the three baby animals. The first rescue attempt while still in Ferngully fails, and results in a huge forest fire, destroying a huge part of the forest and scarring Mother Kangaroo. Pips and the Beetle Boys volunteer to follow the humans to town and rescue the babies, convincing the reluctant Batty to be their guide. They arrive at a town amusement park. They are so fascinated by the rides, they are reminded by Batty to resume their mission.

All this time the fairies have been healing the rainforest and Crysta finds and helps one of the poachers' dogs (she called him Boof) abandoned and caught in a trap. She takes him on a journey to the town. Pips and the Beetle Boys meet a girl named Budgie who is hard at practicing for the clown act. Pips flies over to her and introduces himself and his friends. She gives them shelter in her trailer. Batty has located the poachers' place but the others ignore him too fascinated by modern human utilities. Bark and Batty go to make a rescue attempt, but Batty is caught.

Budgie tells Pips that she has been working on her clown act for years, but she has never been all that good. Pips tells her that she is trying too hard, and she should just do it. Back at where the babies are, the animals are very scared and fear they will never get back home. Batty overcomes his terror of the situation and manages to reassure them. Then the poachers take all the cages and load them onto a big truck. At the fair, Budgie goes to a contest stand and wins a stuffed kangaroo, which reminds Pips of the babies he's supposed to be saving. He tells Budgie about them and she offers to help him out.

They all reach the old warehouse. The poachers drive off, and Budgie jumps off a ledge and lands on the truck. They drive past Budgie's grandfather, and he sees that Budgie is hanging on the truck tarp, and he drives after them. Budgie manages to get inside the car and frees all the birds in the cages. The poachers see Budgie trying to get in the car and are enraged seeing all the birds flying away. One of them climbs out of the truck and tries to get Budgie off. She manages to get away from him, but he unlatches the trailer she's on and sends her rolling backwards on the road. She ends up with one side of the trailer dangling off a cliff. When she falls, Batty catches her and manages to lift her all by himself up to the top of the cliff (in spite of her being double his size) allowing Budgie's grandfather to catch them in his net and bring them safely to solid ground.

The group then head by clown car to the ship where the animals are being loaded. Pips reverses the conveyor catch so that the cages land in Budgie's grandfather's car. A struggle for the cages ensues between the poachers and Budgie. Boof and Crysta arrive to help. The other dog turns against his former master. The boat gets away and the fairies use their magic to stop it by growing a gigantic tree that lifts it. Nugget almost drowns as he escapes. Budgie and her grandfather adopt Slasher and Boof while all the animals and fairies return home.

== Voice cast ==
- Laura Erlich as Crysta
- Digory Oaks as Pips
- Erik Bergmann as Stump and Captain
- Connie Champagne as Budgie
- Holly Conner as Nugget, Bandy, Mrs. K, and additional voices
- Harry Joseph as Boss
- Gary Martin as Goanna and Mac
- Matt K. Miller as Batty
- Westin Peace as Mr. Chuckles
- David Rasner as Boof and Slasher
- Phil Robinson as Father
- J.F. Rockstar as Twig
- K.T. Vogt as Bark and Wal
- Jamie Baker as additional voices

== Production ==
The film was produced by Wild Brain Productions and animated by Wang Film Productions in Tapei, Taiwan. None of the original voice cast reprised their roles. All pre-production work, including character design, layout, storyboard, timing, background and color key took place at WildBrain's facility in San Francisco, while its Los Angeles facility worked on post-production, which included editing, music composition, voice talent casting, sound recording and mixing.

The sequel's release was scheduled for the original film's fifth anniversary in 1997, but was pushed back to March 17, 1998 to avoid competition with other VHS releases during the Christmas sales, including Jingle All the Way, A Christmas Carol, Annabelle's Wish, and Beauty and the Beast: The Enchanted Christmas. It received a direct-to-video release.

== Songs ==
No.	Title	Writer(s)	Performer(s)	Length
1.	"Here in Fern Gully"	Matt McGuire & Sandy Howell
2.	"We Belong"	Roger P. Clark	Lucy Lee with The Forest Chorus
3.	"Funner Than The Funnest Fun"	Roger P. Clark	Big Teen
4.	"Tee Vee Rock"	Roger P. Clark & Tommy Dunbar	Big Teen
5.	"Wanna Be Back Home/We'll Make It If We Try"	Jo-Carol Block/Leo Frappier	Jo-Carol Block, Leo Frappier and Doug Boyd

== Reception ==
The film was less critically successful than the original. Mike Boon from the Calgary Herald gave a negative review, lamenting the loss of Robin Williams and the originality of the first film.
