= Eli Sanders =

Journalist

- Born: 1977 or 1978 (age 48–49)
- Education: Columbia College
- Occupation: Journalist
- Years active: 2005 - Present
- Employer: Editor-in-Chief for The Stranger
- Known for: Pulitzer Prize recipient (2012)
- Website: elisanders.net

Eli Sanders is an American journalist based in Seattle, Washington and is the Editor-in-Chief of The Stranger as of October 12th, 2026. He was previously the Associate Editor of The Stranger until before leaving in September 2020. He won the Pulitzer Prize in Feature Writing in 2012. His win was the first and only Pulitzer ever awarded to The Stranger, and only the seventh time a Pulitzer had been awarded to an alternative newsweekly. The Pulitzer jurors recognized Sanders for "his haunting story of a woman who survived a brutal attack that took the life of her partner, using the woman's brave courtroom testimony and the details of the crime to construct a moving narrative." Sanders also hosted a weekly political podcast for The Stranger, the Blabbermouth Podcast.

In 2016, Sanders published the book "While the City Slept." It examined the three lives that intersected in the crime described in his Pulitzer-winning article, telling the story of two women "newly in love" and their attacker, "a young man on a dangerous psychological descent." The Washington Post called the book "an expertly crafted nonfiction narrative" that tells a story of love and forgiveness while also indicting "the dysfunctional nexus of the criminal justice and mental health systems in the state of Washington and, by extension, across the country." Sanders' book was a finalist for the Edgar Award (Best Fact Crime) and the Dayton Literary Peace Prize.

In 2017, Sanders announced that he would take a temporary leave from The Stranger and work as the deputy communications director to temporary Mayor Tim Burgess. "I'm going to work inside the mayor's office for exactly ten weeks," Sanders wrote. "Then I'm coming back with a story." Sanders didn't say what story he intended to write, but he was clear that he wanted everyone in the mayor's office to know "going in" that he intended to write something. When Sanders returned to The Stranger, he published an in-depth investigative narrative that told the story of the previous Seattle mayor, Ed Murray, who had resigned amid allegations of sexual misconduct. "Their boss allegedly committed sexual assault and abuse," Sanders wrote. "He denied everything. They had to decide: Who do I believe? What do I do?"

After he left The Stranger in 2020, Sanders began publishing published a newsletter, Wild West.

In the fall of 2021, Sanders began studying at the University of Washington School of Law on a Gates Public Service Law Scholarship. While in law school, a lawsuit that had been spurred by Sanders' earlier reporting, State of Washington v. Meta Platforms, resulted in a nearly $25 million fine against Meta Platforms for repeated violations of a unique Washington State campaign finance law that requires transparency in online political ads. Meta has appealed to the Washington State Court of Appeals, claiming that Washington's law is unconstitutional. In 2023, the Brennan Center, the Campaign Legal Center, Fix Democracy First, and the League of Women Voters of Washington filed an amicus brief in the case arguing that Washington's political ad transparency law should be upheld as constitutional.

In May 2023, Sanders published an article in The Atlantic about community moderators on Nextdoor manipulating the platform for political gain.

Sanders graduated from Columbia College of Columbia University in 1999.
