= Norbert Leo Butz =

American actor and singer

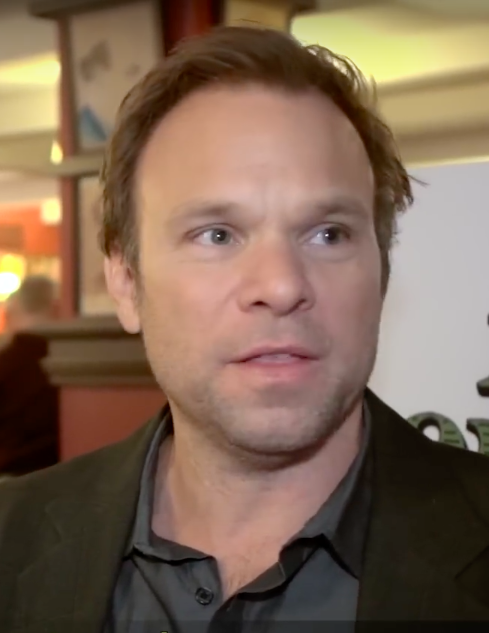
- Butz in 2012
- Born: January 30, 1967 (age 59); St. Louis, Missouri, U.S.
- Education: Webster University (BFA); University of Alabama (MFA)
- Occupations: Actor; singer
- Years active: 1996–present
- Spouse: Michelle Federer (m. 2007) Sydney Davis (m. 1994)
- Children: 3
- Relatives: Teresa Butz (sister)

Norbert Leo Butz (born January 30, 1967) is an American actor and singer known for his work in Broadway theatre. He is a two-time recipient of the Tony Award for Best Actor in a Musical for his performances as Freddy Benson in Dirty Rotten Scoundrels and Carl Hanratty in Catch Me If You Can. He is one of nine actors to have won the award twice.

Butz originated the roles of Fiyero Tigelaar in Wicked and Edward Bloom in Big Fish in their original Broadway casts. His additional Broadway credits include the roles of Roger Davis in Rent, Alfred Doolittle in My Fair Lady, and Hermes in Hadestown. Butz also starred as Jamie Wellerstein in the original cast of The Last Five Years and as the Emcee in the United States tour of Cabaret.

== Early life and education ==
Norbert Leo Butz was born on January 30, 1967, in St. Louis, Missouri, the son of Elaine (née Bourisaw) and Norbert Butz. He was raised in a middle-class family; his parents are devout Catholics. He is the seventh of 11 children and is named after his father. Some of his first theatre roles included playing the male leads at local all-girl high schools, such as Cor Jesu Academy and Nerinx Hall. He graduated from Bishop DuBourg High School. Butz earned a Bachelor of Fine Arts from The Conservatory of Theatre Arts at Webster University and a Master of Fine Arts from The University of Alabama/Alabama Shakespeare Festival's Professional Actor Training Program. He would later receive an honorary degree from Webster University in 2013.

== Career ==
Butz made his Broadway debut as a replacement swing – a type of understudy – in Rent in 1996. Butz ultimately replaced Adam Pascal as Roger Davis in 1997. Additional Broadway credits include Thou Shalt Not (Camille Raquin, 2001–2002), for which he received a nomination for the Tony Award for Best Featured Actor in a Musical at the 56th Tony Awards; Wicked (the original Fiyero, 2003); and Dirty Rotten Scoundrels (Freddy Benson) for which he received the Tony Award for Best Actor in a Musical at the 59th Tony Awards, the Drama Desk Award for Outstanding Actor in a Musical, a Drama League Distinguished Performance Award, and an Outer Critics Circle Award. His Off-Broadway credits include The Last Five Years (Jamie Wellerstein), Saved (Fred), and Juno and the Paycock (Jerry Devine), and he has toured as the Emcee in Cabaret and as Freddy in Dirty Rotten Scoundrels.

Butz's film roles have included Went to Coney Island on a Mission from God... Be Back by Five (Pawnbroker), Noon Blue Apples (Howard Philips), and West of Here (Josiah Blackwell).

Butz's projects include the film Dan in Real Life (with Steve Carell, Juliette Binoche, and Dane Cook), released in October 2007, the world premiere of Is He Dead?, a hitherto unproduced Mark Twain play that opened at Broadway's Lyceum Theatre on December 9, 2007, and Fifty Words Off-Broadway with Elizebeth Marvel at the Lucille Lortel Theatre (2008). In January 2008, he appeared as Captain Richard King in the miniseries adaptation of the Lonesome Dove prequel, Comanche Moon.

Starting December 23, 2008, Butz stepped in to replace Jeremy Piven in David Mamet's Speed-the-Plow; Piven suddenly and unexpectedly dropped out of the play after he experienced health problems. Butz took over the part until January 13, 2009, when William H. Macy assumed the role for the remainder of the play's run.

Butz taught at Drew University in Madison, New Jersey, for the spring semester in 2008 in the drama department.

He starred as Rowdy Kaiser in the ABC show The Deep End.

From April to May 9, 2010, he returned to the Broadway stage in ENRON as Jeffrey Skilling. Despite Tony nominations at the 64th Tony Awards, the play struggled with ticket sales.

Butz starred in the 2011 drama indie film Higher Ground with Vera Farmiga, who also directed it.

Butz originated the role of Carl Hanratty in the musical Catch Me If You Can which played pre-Broadway tryouts at the 5th Avenue Theatre in Seattle, Washington, from July 28 through August 14, 2009. Butz played the role of Carl Hanratty in the Broadway production of Catch Me if You Can, which opened on April 10, 2011, and closed in September 2011. For this role he won his second Drama Desk Award for Outstanding Actor in a Musical and his second Tony Award for Best Actor in a Musical at the 65th Tony Awards.

In April 2012, Butz appeared as himself in one episode of the NBC musical drama Smash. Butz played Hal Wilner in Greetings from Tim Buckley, a film about Tim Buckley and Jeff Buckley, which premiered at the 2012 Toronto International Film Festival.

From November 29, 2012 to January 6, 2013, Butz appeared on Broadway in Theresa Rebeck's Dead Accounts, opposite Katie Holmes, Jayne Houdyshell, Josh Hamilton, and Judy Greer.

In 2013 he starred in the new Andrew Lippa musical Big Fish, which premiered in Chicago in the spring and opened on Broadway in the Neil Simon Theatre in October, directed by Susan Stroman.

In 2012, he played Uncle Peck in a limited engagement revival of Paula Vogel's play How I Learned to Drive. He also starred in the 2013 film Better Living Through Chemistry. He played Kevin Rayburn in the 2015 Netflix television show Bloodline.

He also starred in the 2018 Broadway revival of My Fair Lady as Alfred Doolittle, the father of the leading role, Eliza Doolittle. He earned a nomination for Tony Award for Best Featured Actor in a Musical for the production at the 72nd Tony Awards.

From July 9–28, 2019, he appeared in an original musical collaboration titled TWOHANDER at Feinstein's/54 Below alongside Sherie Rene Scott, with musical director Todd Almond. Butz previously shared the stage with Scott in the original productions of the musicals Dirty Rotten Scoundrels and The Last Five Years.

In 2021, Butz played the role of Craig Maddox in the NBC drama series Debris which is written by J. H. Wyman.

In 2024, Butz played Kosta in the play, Vladimir, by Erika Sheffer at the New York City Center Stage I, which covers the story of a journalist and an accountant who bravely investigate and publicize issues in Russia.

On September 1, 2026, Butz will take over the role of Hermes in the Broadway production of Hadestown.

== Personal life ==
Butz has two daughters from his marriage to Sydney Davis. He later married his former Wicked co-star Michelle Federer in 2007 and their daughter was born on January 2, 2011.

The murder of his sister, Teresa Butz, made national news when an assailant stabbed both her and her girlfriend in her Seattle home on July 19, 2009.

== Acting credits ==
=== Film ===
Year	Title	Role	Ref.
1998	Went to Coney Island on a Mission from God... Be Back by Five	Pawnbroker	
2000	Looking for an Echo	Anthony Pirelli (vocals)	
2002	Noon Blue Apples	Howard Phillips	
2002	West of Here	Josiah Blackwell	
2007	Dan in Real Life	Clay Burns	
2010	Fair Game	Steve	
2011	Higher Ground	Pastor Bill	
2012	Greetings from Tim Buckley	Hal Willner	
2012	Disconnect	Peter	
2013	The English Teacher	Vice Principal Phil Pelaski	
2014	Better Living Through Chemistry	Agent Andrew Carp	
2019	Luce	Dan Towson	
2019	Wonder Park	Peanut (voice)	
2019	Good Posture	Neil	
2020	Give or Take	Ted	
2021	Flag Day	Doc	
2022	Better Nate Than Ever	Rex Foster	
2023	The Exorcist: Believer	Tony West	
2024	A Complete Unknown	Alan Lomax	
2025	Coyotes	Trip	

=== Television ===
Year	Title	Role	Notes
2000	Law & Order: Special Victims Unit	John Fenwick	Episode: "Misleader"
2007	Playing Chicken	Jake	Unsold pilot
2008	Comanche Moon	Richard King	Episode: "#1.2"
2009	Law & Order: Criminal Intent	Archie Beuliss	Episode: "In Treatment"
2010	The Deep End	Rowdy Kaise	7 episodes
2010	CSI: Crime Scene Investigation	Larry Lamotte	Episode: "Bump and Grind"
2011	The Good Wife	Mr. Medina	Episode: "Two Courts"
2011	Late Show with David Letterman	Carl Hanratty	Episode: "Dr. Phil/Chris Hemsworth/Catch Me If You Can"
2011	Blue Bloods	Detective Kramer	Episode: "Moonlighting"
2011	The Miraculous Year	Terry Segal	Television film
2012	Smash	Himself	Episode: "Hell on Earth"
2012	County	Billy Krakowski	Unsold pilot
2015–2017	Bloodline	Kevin Rayburn	Main cast; 33 episodes
2016–2017	Mercy Street	Dr. Byron Hale	Main cast; 12 episodes
2018	Trust	Gordon Getty	3 episodes
2018	The First	Matthew Dawes	2 episodes
2019	Fosse/Verdon	Paddy Chayefsky	Miniseries
2019	Madam Secretary	Lochlainn Heeney, Jr.	2 episodes
2021	Debris	Craig Maddox	Main cast
2022	The Girl from Plainville	Conrad "Co" Roy II	8 episodes
2023	Justified: City Primeval	Norbert Bryl	Main cast
2024	American Sports Story	Bill Belichick	Miniseries
2025	Law & Order: Special Victims Unit	Mark Olson	Episode: "A Vicious Circle"

=== Theatre ===
Year	Title	Role	Notes
1996	Rent	u/s Roger Davis & Mark Cohen	Nederlander Theatre, Broadway
1997	Rent	Roger Davis	Nederlander Theatre, Broadway
1999–2000	Cabaret	The Emcee	US Tour
2000	Rent	Roger Davis	Nederlander Theatre, Broadway
2000	Juno and the Paycock	Jerry Levine	Gramercy Theatre, Off-Broadway
2001–2002	Thou Shalt Not	Camille Raquin	Gerald Schoenfeld Theatre, Broadway
2002	The Last Five Years	Jamie Wellerstein	Minetta Lane Theatre, Off-Broadway
2002	Carousel	Jigger Craigin	Carnegie Hall
2003	Buicks	Bill Abeline	Underwood Theatre, Off-Broadway
2003–2004	Wicked	Fiyero	Curran Theatre, San Francisco (pre-Broadway) Gershwin Theatre, Broadway
2005–2006	Dirty Rotten Scoundrels	Freddy Benson	Imperial Theatre, Broadway US Tour
2007–2008	Is He Dead?	Jean-François Millet	Lyceum Theatre, Broadway
2008–2009	Speed-the-Plow	Bobby Gould	Ethel Barrymore Theatre, Broadway
2008	Fifty Words	Adam	Lucille Lortel Theatre, Off-Broadway
2010	Enron	Jeffrey Skilling	Broadhurst Theatre, Broadway
2011	Catch Me If You Can	Agent Carl Hanratty	5th Avenue Theatre, Seattle (pre-Broadway) Neil Simon Theatre, Broadway
2012	How I Learned to Drive	Uncle Peck	Second Stage Theatre, Off-Broadway
2012–2013	Dead Accounts	Jack	Music Box Theatre, Broadway
2013	Big Fish	Edward Bloom	Nederlander Theatre, Chicago (pre-Broadway) Neil Simon Theatre, Broadway
2017	The Whirligig	Michael	Pershing Square Signature Center, Off-Broadway
2018–2019	My Fair Lady	Alfred P. Doolittle	Vivian Beaumont Theatre, Broadway
2023	Cornelia Street	Jacob	Atlantic Theater Company, Off-Broadway
2023	Gutenberg! The Musical!	The Producer	James Earl Jones Theatre, Broadway (one night cameo)
2024	Edge of the World	Henry	Classic Stage Company, Off-Broadway
2024	Vladimir	Kostya	Manhattan Theatre Club, Off-Broadway
2026	The Recipe	Paul Child	La Jolla Playhouse
2026	Are You Now or Have You Ever Been	Abe Burrows (July 13–August 2)	New York City Center Stage I, Off-Broadway
2026	Hadestown	Hermes	Walter Kerr Theatre, Broadway

== Awards and nominations ==
Year	Association	Category	Nominated work	Result	Ref.
2000	Dora Mavor Moore Award	Best Leading Actor, Musical Theatre	Cabaret	Won	
2002	Tony Award	Best Performance by a Featured Actor in a Musical	Thou Shalt Not	Nominated	
2002	Drama Desk Award	Outstanding Featured Actor in a Musical	Thou Shalt Not	Nominated	
2002	Outer Critics Circle Award	Outstanding Featured Actor in a Musical	Thou Shalt Not	Nominated	
2002	Drama Desk Award	Outstanding Actor in a Musical	The Last Five Years	Nominated	
2003	Drama Desk Award	Outstanding Actor in a Play	Buicks	Nominated	
2005	Tony Award	Best Performance by a Leading Actor in a Musical	Dirty Rotten Scoundrels	Won	
2005	Drama Desk Award	Outstanding Actor in a Musical	Dirty Rotten Scoundrels	Won	
2005	Drama League Award	Distinguished Performance	Dirty Rotten Scoundrels	Won	
2005	Outer Critics Circle Award	Outstanding Actor in a Musical	Dirty Rotten Scoundrels	Won	
2011	Tony Award	Best Performance by a Leading Actor in a Musical	Catch Me if You Can	Won	
2011	Drama Desk Award	Outstanding Actor in a Musical	Catch Me if You Can	Won	
2011	Outer Critics Circle Award	Outstanding Actor in a Musical	Catch Me if You Can	Nominated	
2018	Tony Award	Best Performance by a Featured Actor in a Musical	My Fair Lady	Nominated	
2018	Outer Critics Circle Award	Outstanding Featured Actor in a Musical	My Fair Lady	Won	
2019	Grammy Award	Best Musical Theater Album	My Fair Lady	Nominated	
2025	Screen Actors Guild Awards	Outstanding Performance by a Cast in a Motion Picture	A Complete Unknown	Nominated	

== Discography ==
- Memory and Mayhem: Live at 54 Below (2013)
- The Angel Band Project: An Evening With Norbert Leo Butz (2014)
- Girls Girls Girls: Live at 54 Below (2016)
- The Long Haul (2019)
