= Matt K. Miller =

American dramatist

- Born: Matthew Kermit Miller
- Other names: Kermit Beachwood; Matthew Kermit Miller; Matt Kermit Miller
- Occupations: Actor; stand-up comedian; playwright
- Years active: 1981–present
- Spouse: Katherine C. Miller (née Pappa)
- Children: 1

Matthew Kermit Miller is an American actor, stand-up comedian and playwright. He is also known as Kermit Miller and Kermit Beachwood. His best-known voice role in anime was Tenchi Masaki in the Pioneer dub of Tenchi Muyo!. He reprised the role in the Funimation English dub of Ai Tenchi Muyo! in 2018.

== Career ==
Miller has performed voice work in numerous film and television projects, but is better known as a stage actor and playwright who has performed with the Royal National Theatre of Great Britain, Sacramento Theatre Company, Sierra Repertory Theatre, and Foothill Theatre Company. Miller became artistic director of the Sacramento Theatre Company in 2010.

=== Recognition ===
The Sacramento News & Review called Miller's portrayal of Ebenezer Scrooge in the Sacramento Theatre Company's December 2007 production of A Christmas Carol, "outstanding".

In 2009, he wrote and starred in the solo show Fits & Parts: My Life in Stages, a memoir on his own career as working actor and voiceover artist for Japanese anime. Of his performance, Sacramento News & Review wrote that Miller's "personable outlook, storytelling skills and good timing with jokes make a winning combination," with the Sacramento Bee called his performance both entertaining and engaging. Also in 2009, Miller wrote Beat Aside Apollo's Arrow, for which he received a John Gassner Award.

Sacramento Bee made special note of Miller's debut as director of the Sacramento Theatre Company in their review of the theatre company's October 2010 presentation of The Importance of Being Earnest, writing "The importance of this 'Earnest' lies in its significance as director Matt K. Miller's debut as STC artistic director and as the company's season-opening production. Though Miller did not select the comedy or most of the STC 2010–11 season, he recognizes his good fortune in the playbill, noting 'Earnest' is as close to 'fool-proof' as a play gets". They also made note of Miller having adapted the play slightly so that it moved briskly.

In praising the STC's November 2010 presentation of The Owl and the Pussycat, the Sacramento Bee wrote "the production is as good as it is as a tribute to Miller and his cast and crew."

In Miller's return to the character of Scrooge in December 2010, Sacramento Press writes, "It is the portrayal of Scrooge that makes the difference between a good and a great production of A Christmas Carol. Fortunately for STC, they have Matt K. Miller, an outstanding and very experienced Scrooge." The noted that Miller's transition from Scrooge the miser to the loving and generous Scrooge is very believable.

=== Awards and nominations ===
- 2009: John Gassner Award for his play Beat Aside Apollo's Arrow.

== Filmography ==
=== Anime dubbing ===
- Bio Hunter - Koshigaya
- Carried by the Wind: Tsukikage Ran - Fisherman (Ep. 7), Ukiya-Tei Henchman
- Castle in the Sky - Train Engineer, Additional Voices
- Cowboy Bebop - Additional Voices
- The Dog of Flanders - Mr. Ike
- Final Fantasy: Legend of the Crystals - Prettz
- Fushigi Yûgi - Additional Voices
- Gate Keepers - Creditor
- Ghost in the Shell: Stand Alone Complex Dr. Miyashiro (Ep. 3)
- Giant Robo - Additional Voices (Animaze dub)
- Kiki's Delivery Service - Policeman, Receptionist (Disney version)
- Mobile Suit Gundam - The Movie Trilogy - Mulligan
- Mobile Suit Gundam 0080: War in the Pocket - Andy Strauss
- Perfect Blue - Mima Fan
- Pet Shop of Horrors - Robin Hendrix
- Psycho Diver: Soul Siren - Funky
- Rurouni Kenshin - Sailor (Ep. 25), Shuji, Schneider
- Tenchi Muyo! series – Tenchi Masaki, others
- Trigun - Chief (Ep. 19)
- Twilight of the Dark Master - Tenku
- Vampire Princess Miyu - Matchiyama (Ep. 1)

=== Animation ===
- Æon Flux - Ilbrid (Ep. 8)
- Gen^{13} - Additional Voices
- Spicy City - Additional Voices
- FernGully 2: The Magical Rescue - Batty Koda (voice) (1998) (replacing Robin Williams)
- 101 Dalmatians II: Patch's London Adventure - Additional Voices (2003) (uncredited)

=== Video games ===
- Final Fantasy X/Final Fantasy X-2 - Clasko
- Medal of Honor: Allied Assault - Spearhead - Additional Voices

=== Live action ===
- Courthouse - Reporter #3 (1 episode, 1995)
- VR Troopers - Combax (1 episode, 1995)
- Mighty Morphin Power Rangers - Garbage Mouth, Parrot Top (2 episodes, 1995)
- Masked Rider - Bananatex (1 episode, 1996)
- Off Centre - Executive #1 (1 episode, 2002)
- Gods and Generals - Brig. Gen. Charles Griffin (uncredited) (2003)
- Henry X - Emile (2003)
- Team Room (2008)
