= Dead Accounts =

Play written by Theresa Rebeck

- Written by: Theresa Rebeck
- Original language: English
- Genre: Comedy
- Setting: present day Cincinnati

Premiere
- Date premiered: November 29, 2012
- Place premiered: Music Box Theatre

Dead Accounts is a Broadway play written by Theresa Rebeck. The comedy premiered at the Music Box Theatre on November 29, 2012, and closed on January 6, 2013. The production starred Norbert Leo Butz and Katie Holmes, and was directed by Jack O'Brien.

== Production ==
Dead Accounts opened on Broadway at the Music Box Theater on November 29, 2012. The play was first performed at the Cincinnati Playhouse in the Park in February 2012.

The Broadway production was directed by Jack O'Brien, and starred Norbert Leo Butz and Katie Holmes, in her return to Broadway (after her 2008 debut in All My Sons). Initially only a 16-week run on Broadway, it was announced that Dead Accounts would close early due to poor ticket sales. The last performance was on January 6, 2013.

== Premise ==
Dead Accounts centers on Jack's unexpected return to Cincinnati, after spending several years in New York City. His family, included his sister Lorna, and mother Barbara, immediately suspect he is in some sort of trouble. This is confirmed when Jack's soon-to-be ex-wife, Jenny arrives, and reveals Jack has stolen 27 million dollars.

== Cast and characters ==
- Jack, a banker from New York who returns to his home in Ohio
- Lorna, Jack's sister, who lives at home to take care of her aging parents
- Barbra, Jack's mother
- Phil, Jack's best friend
- Jenny, Jack's estranged wife

Character	Music Box Theatre, Broadway Premiere (2013)
Jack	Norbert Leo Butz
Lorna	Katie Holmes
Barbra	Jayne Houdyshell
Phil	Josh Hamilton
Jenny	Judy Greer

== Reception ==
Dead Accounts received mixed-to-negative reviews from most critics. Entertainment Weekly called the comedy "engaging, but unsatisfying", but said Holmes was not believable. Ben Brantley of The New York Times criticized the show for not settling on a single tone or subject matter. However, he did praise Butz's performance, as well as the supporting parts of Hamilton and Greer. Brantley also noted that Holmes was more at ease than she was in her 2008 Broadway debut in All My Sons.
