= Karen Johnson (producer) =

Karen Johnson is an American television soap opera director, producer, writer and editor.

== Positions held ==
All My Children

- Writer (January 2008 - March 2008)
- Producer (2004–present)
- Associate Director (1997–2004)
- Editor (1998–2004)

Loving

- Sound Mixing Supervisor (1995)
- Production Assistant (1993–1995)

The City

- Associate Director (entire run, 1995–1997)

== Awards and nominations ==
Daytime Emmy Award

- Nomination, 2005, Drama Series, All My Children
- Nomination, 2004, Editing, All My Children
- Win, 2003, Directing, All My Children
- Nomination, 1998, 1999, 2000, 2001, 2002, 2003; Directing, All My Children
- Nomination, 2002, Editing, All My Children
- Win, 2001, Editing, All My Children
- Nomination, 2000, Editing, All My Children
- Nomination, 1999, Editing, All My Children
