= FAI Films =

Australian film production company

- Company type: production company
- Industry: film
- Predecessor: Kroyer Films
- Founded: 1991
- Defunct: March 2001
- Fate: Acquired by HIH Insurance
- Products: FernGully: The Last Rainforest; FernGully 2: The Magical Rescue

FAI Films was an Australian film production company known for the 1992 animated film FernGully: The Last Rainforest.

== Name ==
The studio was owned by the Australian company Fire and All Risks Insurance (later FAI Insurance), founded by Lawrence Adler. Both companies shared the FAI "running man" logo.

== Productions ==
The company produced only one theatrical release, FernGully: The Last Rainforest in 1992, and a direct-to-video sequel, FernGully 2: The Magical Rescue, in 1998.

== Demise ==
In 1998, FAI Insurance was acquired by HIH Insurance, which collapsed in March 2001. In June 2012, administrators for HIH placed advertisements trying to sell the rights to both films. On November 11, 2021 Shout! Factory announced a deal with Machine Media Advisors, stated to be the owner of the rights to FernGully, for worldwide distribution rights to the first film.
