= Joshua Bergasse =

American choreographer and dancer

- Born: Joshua Alexandre Bergasse; March 6, 1973 (age 52); Farmington Hills, Michigan, U.S.
- Occupations: Choreographer, dancer

Joshua Alexandre Bergasse (born March 6, 1973) is an American choreographer and dancer. He has won a Primetime Emmy Award for Outstanding Choreography for his work on the TV show, Smash. He has choreographed a number of Broadway and Off-Broadway musicals such as Charlie and the Chocolate Factory, the 2014 revival of On the Town (his first Tony Award nomination for Best Choreography), the Off-Broadway revival of Rodgers and Hart’s I Married an Angel, and the Broadway production of Smash, the latter which gave him his second Tony Award nomination for Best Choreography in 2025.

== Early life ==
Joshua Bergasse was born on March 6, 1973, and grew up in Farmington Hills, Michigan. He attended his mother's dance studio and later taught there. He says he was influenced by Bob Fosse, Gene Kelly, Fred Astaire, Hermes Pan, and Michael Kidd.

== Career ==
At age 22, Bergasse auditioned for the national tour of West Side Story during a vacation in New York City. He was offered the role of Baby John and was a member of the tour for two years. After the tour ended, he stayed in New York to continue working as a dancer.

In 2012, Bergasse became a choreographer for the TV show Smash for its two-season run. He got the job after the director, Michael Mayer, saw some of Bergasse's work at a New York University benefit. During the filming of the second season, Bergasse was able to choreograph for both of the hypothetical musicals: Bombshell and Hit List. In 2012, Bergasse won a Primetime Emmy Award for Outstanding Choreography for his work on Smash.

In 2014, Bergasse choreographed the Broadway revival of On the Town. He received an Astaire Award and a Tony Award nomination for Best Choreography.

Bergasse choreographed the Broadway revival of Gigi in 2015, as well as the Off-Broadway productions of Sweet Charity, Captain Louie, and Cagney. He earned a Drama Desk, an Astaire, and an Outer Critics Circle Award nomination for his choreography in Cagney. His other choreographic credits include West Side Story at the Stratford Festival, Little Me at City Center Encores!, It's a Bird... It's a Plane... It's Superman at City Center Encores!, Pirates of Penzance at Barrington Stage Co., Guys and Dolls at Carnegie Hall, and The Sound of Music at Carnegie Hall.

Bergasse choreographed the Broadway musical Charlie and the Chocolate Factory in 2017.

In 2019, Bergasse directed and choreographed a revival of the Rodgers and Hart musical I Married an Angel for the New York City Encores! series. This production starred his wife, Sara Mearns.

After serving as choreographer for Smash, the NBC sitcom, Bergasse choreographed the Broadway premiere of the musical production in 2025, which garnered him his second Tony Award nomination for Best Choreography.

== Personal life ==
In November 2012, Bergasse met Sara Mearns when she was auditioning for a featured dancing role on Smash. After five years of dating, they got engaged on Valentine's Day. They were married on November 3, 2018, in Sunset Beach, North Carolina. They have worked on projects together since their marriage such as Rodgers and Hart's I Married an Angel. They divorced in 2024.[9]

== Stage credits ==
Year	Title	Role	Venue	Ref.
1995	West Side Story	Baby John	U.S. National Tour	
1997	The Life	Ensemble	Broadway, Ethel Barrymore Theatre	
2002	Hairspray	Swing	Broadway, Neil Simon Theatre	
2004	Movin' Out	Ensemble	U.S. National Tour	
2014	On the Town	Choreographer	Broadway, Lyric Theatre	
2015	Gigi	Choreographer	Broadway, Neil Simon Theatre	
2016	Cagney	Choreographer	Off-Broadway, Westside Theatre	
2016	Sweet Charity	Choreographer	Off-Broadway, The Pershing Square Signature Center	
2017	Charlie and the Chocolate Factory	Choreographer	Broadway, Lunt-Fontanne Theatre	
2018	Smokey Joe's Cafe	Choreographer	Off-Broadway, Stage 42	
2019	I Married an Angel	Choreographer	Off-Broadway, New York City Center Encores!	
2021	A Crossing	Playwright	Regional, Barrington Stage Company	
2025	Smash	Choreographer	Broadway, Imperial Theatre	
2025	Joy	Choreographer	Off-Broadway, Laura Pels Theatre	
2025	Bull Durham	Choreographer	Regional, Paper Mill Playhouse	

== Awards and nominations ==
Year	Award	Category	Work	Result	Ref.
2012	Primetime Emmy Awards	Primetime Emmy Award for Outstanding Choreography	Smash	Won	
2015	Tony Awards	Tony Award for Best Choreography	On the Town	Nominated	
2015	Drama Desk Awards	Outstanding Choreography	On the Town	Nominated	
2015	Outer Critics Circle Awards	Outstanding Choreography	On the Town	Nominated	
2015	Astaire Awards	Best Choreographer	On the Town	Won	
2016	Drama Desk Awards	Outstanding Choreography	Cagney	Nominated	
2016	Outer Critics Circle Awards	Outstanding Choreography	Cagney	Nominated	
2016	Astaire Awards	Outstanding Choreography in an Off-Broadway Show	Cagney	Nominated	
2017	Lucille Lortel Awards	Outstanding Choreographer	Sweet Charity	Nominated	
2017	Chita Rivera Awards	Outstanding Choreography in an Off-Broadway Show	Sweet Charity	Won	
2017	Chita Rivera Awards	Outstanding Choreography in a Broadway Show	Charlie and the Chocolate Factory	Nominated	
2019	Chita Rivera Awards	Outstanding Choreography in an Off-Broadway Show	Smokey Joe's Cafe	Nominated	
2025	Tony Awards	Best Choreography	Smash	Nominated	
2025	Chita Rivera Awards	Outstanding Choreography in a Broadway Show	Smash	Nominated	
