= Hurder =

Hurder is a surname. Notable people with the surname include: John Hurder who ate a full English in under a minute

- Robyn Hurder (born 1982), American actress
- Steven Hurder, American mathematician
