= Drama Desk Award for Outstanding Featured Performance in a Musical =

Annual theater award

- Awarded for: Outstanding Featured Performance in a Musical
- Location: New York City
- Country: United States
- Presented by: Drama Desk
- First award: 2023
- Currently held by: Judy Kuhn, The Baker's Wife; Ben Levi Ross, Ragtime; (2026)
- Website: dramadesk.org

The Drama Desk Award for Outstanding Featured Performance in a Musical is an annual award presented by Drama Desk in recognition of achievements in theatre across collective Broadway, off-Broadway and off-off-Broadway productions in New York City.

From 1955 to 1974, acting awards were given only for lead performances, without making distinctions between roles in plays and musicals, nor between actors and actresses. From 1975 to 2022, acting awards were presented in eight categories: separate categories by gender; further divided by lead or featured performer; producing four acting awards each for plays and musicals.

In 2023, the Drama Desk organization announced that, starting with that year's awards, the eight acting categories had been retired and replaced with four gender neutral categories with twice the winners and nominees: separate categories by lead or featured performer; producing two acting categories each for plays and musicals. The former awards for Outstanding Featured Actor in a Musical and Featured Actress in a Musical were merged to create this Outstanding Featured Performance in a Musical category.

== Winners and nominees ==
Key

and bold indicates the winner.

=== 2020s ===
| Year | Actor | Title | Character | Ref. |
2023
| 2023 | **Kevin Del Aguila** | **Some Like It Hot** | **Osgood Fielding III** | |
| 2023 | **Alex Newell** | **Shucked** | **Lulu** | |
| 2023 | Kevin Cahoon | Shucked | Peanut | |
| 2023 | Robyn Hurder | A Beautiful Noise | Marcia Murphey | |
| 2023 | Mark Jacoby | A Beautiful Noise | Neil Diamond (Now) | |
| 2023 | Tarra Conner Jones | White Girl in Danger | Nell Gibbs | |
| 2023 | Julia Lester | Into the Woods | Little Red Riding Hood | |
| 2023 | Daniel Radcliffe | Merrily We Roll Along | Charley Kringas | |
| 2023 | Phillipa Soo | Into the Woods | Cinderella | |
| 2023 | Mare Winningham | A Man of No Importance | Lilly Byrne | |
| 2024 | **Kecia Lewis** | **Hell's Kitchen** | **Miss Liza Jane** | |
| 2024 | **Bebe Neuwirth** | **Cabaret** | **Fräulein Schneider** | |
| 2024 | Shoshana Bean | Hell's Kitchen | Jersey | |
| 2024 | Natalie Venetia Belcon | Buena Vista Social Club | Omara Portuondo | |
| 2024 | Dorian Harewood | The Notebook | Older Noah Calhoun | |
| 2024 | Leslie Rodriguez Kritzer | Spamalot | Lady of the Lake | |
| 2024 | Steven Pasquale | Teeth | Pastor Bill O'Keefe | |
| 2024 | Maryann Plunkett | The Notebook | Older Allison "Allie" Calhoun | |
| 2024 | Thom Sesma | Dead Outlaw | Thomas Noguchi | |
| 2024 | Emily Skinner | Suffs | Alva Belmont / Phoebe Burn | |
2025
| 2025 | **Brooks Ashmanskas** | **Smash** | **Nigel** | |
| 2025 | **Jak Malone** | **Operation Mincemeat** | **Hester Leggatt & others** | |
| 2025 | **Michael Urie** | **Once Upon a Mattress** | **Prince Dauntless** | |
| 2025 | Nicholas Barasch | Pirates! The Penzance Musical | Frederic | |
| 2025 | André De Shields | Cats: "The Jellicle Ball" | Old Deuteronomy | |
| 2025 | John El-Jor | We Live in Cairo | Karim | |
| 2025 | Jason Gotay | Floyd Collins | Homer Collins | |
| 2025 | Gracie Lawrence | Just in Time | Connie Francis | |
| 2025 | Lesli Margherita | Gypsy | Tessie Tura | |
| 2025 | Zachary Noah Piser | See What I Wanna See | The Janitor and A Priest | |
| 2025 | Jenny Lee Stern | Forbidden Broadway: Merrily We Stole a Song | Performer | |
| 2025 | Natalie Walker | The Big Gay Jamboree | Flora | |
2026
| 2026 | **Judy Kuhn** | **The Baker's Wife** | **Denise** | |
| 2026 | **Ben Levi Ross** | **Ragtime** | **Younger Brother** | |
| 2026 | Chris Blisset | Beau the Musical | Beau | |
| 2026 | Max Clayton | Schmigadoon! | Danny Bailey | |
| 2026 | Lilli Cooper | The 25th Annual Putnam County Spelling Bee | Rona Lisa Peretti | |
| 2026 | Stephanie Hsu | The Rocky Horror Show | Janet | |
| 2026 | McKenzie Kurtz | Schmigadoon! | Betsy | |
| 2026 | Ruthie Ann Miles | The Seat of Our Pants | Mrs. Antrobus | |
| 2026 | Erin Morton | Heathers: The Musical | Martha Dunnstock | |
| 2026 | Jackson Kanawha Perry | Saturday Church | Raymond | |
| 2026 | Jasmine Amy Rogers | The 25th Annual Putnam County Spelling Bee | Olive Ostrovsky | |
| 2026 | Layton Williams | Titanique | The Seaman/Iceberg | |
