= Don't Forget Me =

Don't Forget Me may refer to:

- Don't Forget Me (horse) (1984–2010), Thoroughbred racehorse
- Don't Forget Me (1996 film), a 1996 Croatian film
- Don't Forget Me (2016 film), a 2016 Korean film
- Don't Forget Me (Al tishkechi oti), a 2017 Israeli film by Ram Nehari that won the 35th Torino Film Festival
- Don't Forget Me (album), a 2024 album by Maggie Rogers
- "Don't Forget Me" (Smash song), a 2012 song from the TV series Smash
- "Don't Forget Me" (1927 song), a song by the band 1927
- "Don't Forget Me (When I'm Gone)", a 1986 song by Glass Tiger
- "Don't Forget Me", a song by the Gear Daddies from Let's Go Scare Al, 1988
- "Don't Forget Me", a song by Harry Nilsson from Pussy Cats, 1974
- "Don't Forget Me", a song by Imagine Dragons from Loom, 2024
- "Don't Forget Me", a song by Maggie Rogers from her 2024 album of the same name
- "Don't Forget Me", a song by Mark Lanegan from Field Songs, 2001
- "Don't Forget Me", a song by Monni, 2017
- "Don't Forget Me", a song by Old Dominion from Time, Tequila & Therapy, 2021
- "Don't Forget Me", a song by the Red Hot Chili Peppers from By the Way, 2002
- "Don't Forget Me", a song by Way Out West from Don't Look Now, 2004
- "Don't Forget Me", a song by Yung Bleu from Tantra, 2022

== See also ==
- Don't You Forget About Me (disambiguation)
