= Smash =

Smash may refer to:

== People ==
- Smash (wrestler) (born 1959), professional wrestler
- Moondog Rex, another professional wrestler who briefly wrestled as the original Smash, before being replaced by the above
- DJ Smash, Russian DJ and EDM-music producer

== Art, entertainment, and media ==
- Smash (novel), a 1980 novel by Garson Kanin
- Smash or pass?
- Smash! (comics), a 1960s British comic
- smash., a Japanese video streaming service
- Super Smash Bros., commonly shortened to Smash, a crossover platform fighting video game series
- Smash (musical), American Broadway musical

=== Fictional entities ===
- SMASH (comics), a team of superheroes
- Smash Williams, fictional character in the television series Friday Night Lights

=== Film and television ===
- Smash (Swedish TV series), a 1990 Swedish miniseries
- Smash (TV series), a 2012 NBC drama series
- Attack on Tomorrow, a 1977 Japanese anime series known in Europe as Smash
- Smash Pictures, an adult film production company
- Smash, a 1971 SRC variety series starring Patsy Gallant and others

=== Music ===
==== Bands and enterprises ====
- Smash (music promoters), a Japanese rock music concert and festival promoter
- Smash Records, a record label
- Smash (British band), an English punk trio
- Smash (Indonesian band), a boy band from Indonesia
- Smash (Russian band), a Russian pop duo
- Smash (Spanish band), 1967–1973

==== Albums ====
- Smash (Jackson and His Computerband album)
- Smash (Martin Solveig album), 2011
- Smash: The Singles 1985–2020, a compilation album by Pet Shop Boys
- Smash (Switch album)
- Smash (The Offspring album)
- SMASH, an album by Cindy Alexander

==== Songs ====
- "Smash", song by the Norwegian singer Tone Damli
- "Smash", song by American band The Offspring from Smash
- "Smash", song by American rapper Rob Stone from Don't Wait For It
- "Smash", song by American band The Casualties
- "Smash", song by South Korean singer BoA from Kiss My Lips
- "Smash", song by American band Goo Goo Dolls from Gutterflower
- "Smash", song by American band Varsity
- "Smash!", song by the Dutch-Turkish Ummet Ozcan
- "Smash!", song from the TV series Smash
- "Smash!", song by American rapper XXXTentacion from ?
- "Smash!", song by American comedy group Starbomb from Player Select

== Computing ==
- SMASH (hash), a cryptographic hash function
- Systems Management Architecture for Server Hardware
- WebSphere sMash, a software environment
- Smash, a file transfer service

== Events ==
- Smash! (comics), a 1960s British comic
- SMASH! (convention), an annual Japanese popular culture convention held in Sydney, Australia

== Food and drink ==
- Smash (instant mashed potato), a brand of instant mashed potatoes
- Smash (chocolate), a Norwegian chocolate snack
- Smash (cocktail), a casual cocktail filled with hunks of fresh fruit

== Mathematics ==
- Smash product, in algebraic topology

== Missiles ==
- P282 SMASH, a Pakistani ship-launched ballistic missile

== Sport ==
- Smash (professional wrestling), a Japanese promotion
- An overhead shot in some racket sports such as:
  - Smash (tennis)
  - Smash (pickleball)

== Education ==
- Santa Monica Alternative School House (SMASH), an alternative school in Santa Monica, California, United States

== Other uses ==
- Aselsan SMASH, a remote controlled weapon station
- Smashes, a term for romantic friendships between women (late 19th and early 20th centuries)
