= Smashville =

Smashville may refer to:

== Sports ==
- "Smashville", a nickname for the Nashville Predators
- Team Smashville, a people's choice winner at the 23 September 2017 Red Bull Flugtag

== Games ==
- "Smashville", a level from Super Smash Bros. Brawl based on Animal Crossing
- "Smashville", a game level from the collectibles game Monsterpocalypse

== Entertainment ==
- "SMASHVILLE" (song), a song written by Jim Van Cleve

== See also ==
- Smash (disambiguation)
