= Smashed =

Smashed may refer to:

- "Smashed" (Buffy the Vampire Slayer), a season six episode of Buffy the Vampire Slayer
- "Smashed" (Arrested Development), a season four episode of Arrested Development
- Smashed (film), a 2012 film directed by James Ponsoldt
- Smashed (memoir), a 2005 memoir by Koren Zailckas
- "Smashed", a song from the 2011 album The Black Crown by Suicide Silence

== See also ==
- Smash (disambiguation)
