= Smash (musical) =

American musical

- 2025 Playbill cover
- Music: Marc Shaiman
- Lyrics: Scott Wittman and Marc Shaiman
- Book: Rick Elice and Bob Martin
- Basis: Smash (TV series)
- Productions: 2025 Broadway

Smash is an American musical with music by Marc Shaiman and lyrics by Shaiman and Scott Wittman, and a book by Rick Elice and Bob Martin. Based on the 2012–2013 NBC television series of the same name created by Theresa Rebeck, the musical includes songs from the TV series and an original finale song written for the stage. Like the television series, the musical follows the creation of a musical about the life of Marilyn Monroe. The show opened at the Imperial Theatre on April 10, 2025.

== Development ==
In June 2015 the original cast of the NBC series reunited in a concert co-directed by Joshua Bergasse, who also choreographed the show, and Scott Wittman. Tickets for the event were made available to fans who donated to a Kickstarter campaign to fund the concert and were sold out in an hour. Series leads Megan Hilty and Katharine McPhee were joined by Christian Borle, Debra Messing, Will Chase, Jaime Cepero, Brian d'Arcy James, Ann Harada, Jeremy Jordan, Donna McKechnie, Leslie Odom Jr. and Wesley Taylor.

In May 2020, shortly after a virtual cast reunion during a live-streamed concert, it was announced that a musical based solely on the plot of the series was in the works for a Broadway production. Producer Steven Spielberg, Greenblatt, and Meron are all attached as producers, with Bob Martin and Rick Elice penning the book to Wittman and Shaiman's score, and Bergasse returning to choreograph. Of the announcement, Spielberg stated, "Smash is near and dear to my heart, and it seems fitting that a new musical inspired by what we did on the show would eventually come to the stage. I'm beyond thrilled to be working with this incredible creative team and my producing partners, who began the Smash journey with me over 10 years ago."

On May 20, 2022, a first reading followed by a week-long workshop occurred of "SMASH: The Musical," with a script by Martin and Elice, music and lyrics by Wittman and Shaiman, and produced by Spielberg, Greenblatt, and Meron. According to Shaiman, while there are no "concrete plans" to bring the musical to Broadway, he was hopeful it would premiere on Broadway "sooner than later." Among the performers were Hilty, Krysta Rodriguez, who also appeared in the TV series, Brooks Ashmanskas, Beth Leavel, Bonnie Milligan, Daniel Breaker, Kristine Nielsen, Maddie Baillio, and Christian Thompson, with Stephen Oremus as musical director.

== Synopsis ==
Based on the 2012 TV show, Smash follows the backstage chaos of Bombshell, a new musical about Marilyn Monroe. Broadway star Ivy Lynn, stressed under the pressure of such a legendary story, causes a series of roadblocks that challenge the authors, producers, director, and the understudy of the show. But it's going to open, whether the actors are ready or not! The musical contains many of the songs and dances from the original TV show.

== Productions ==
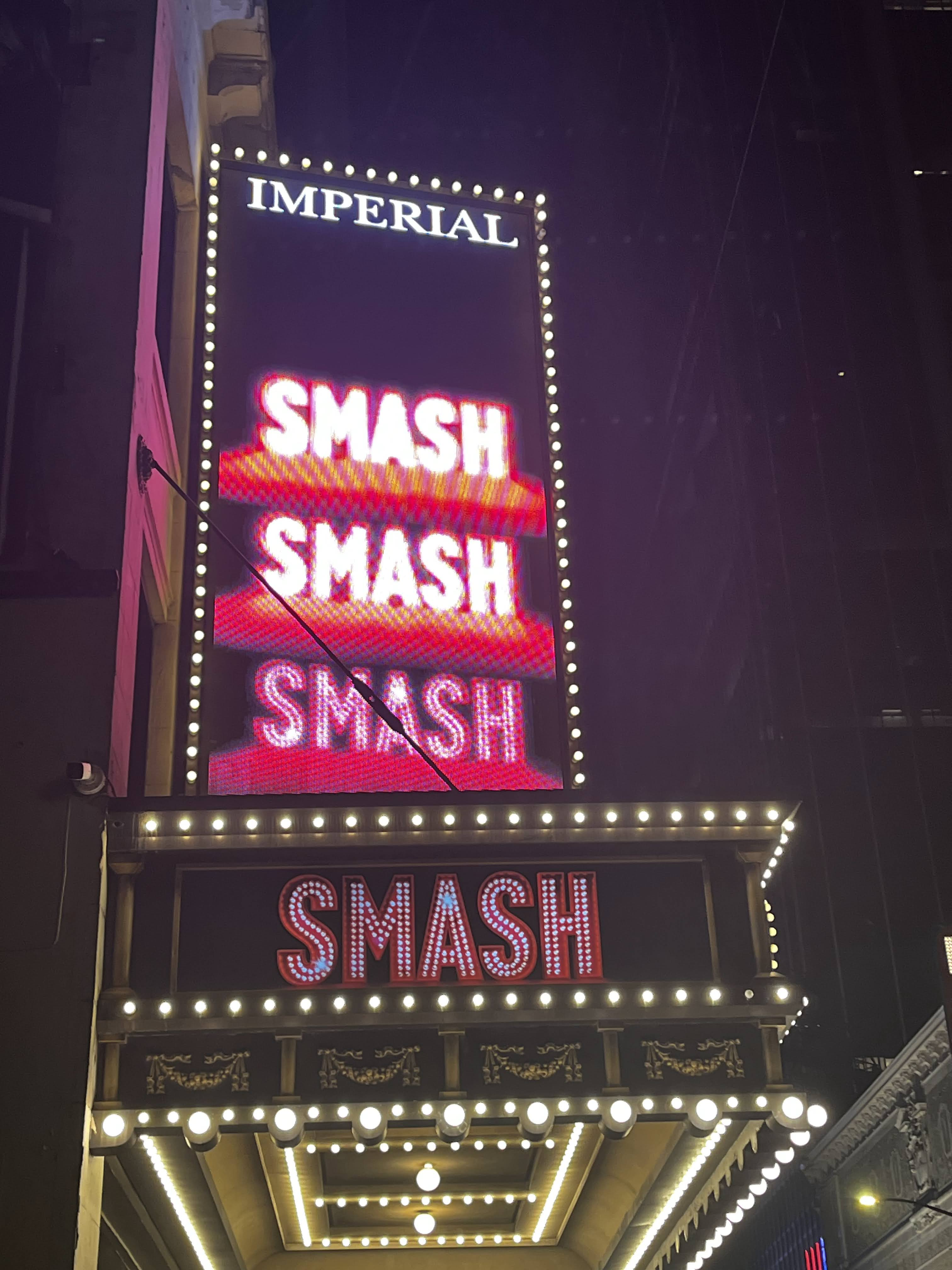
2025 Smash Marquis at the Imperial Theatre

=== Broadway (2025) ===
On March 22, 2023, it was announced that Smash would officially open during the 2024–25 Broadway season with five-time Tony Award winner Susan Stroman directing and Bergasse choreographing, music and lyrics by Shaiman and Wittman, and a book by Elice and Martin with lighting design by Ken Billington. On January 4, 2024, it was announced that Smash would have a six-week workshop starting that month, with cast members Ashmanskas, Alex Brightman, Yvette Nicole Brown, Bella Coppola, Nihar Duvvuri, Casey Garvin, Robyn Hurder, Nielsen, Rodriguez, and Jonalyn Saxer. Smash began performances at the Imperial Theatre on March 11, 2025 with an official opening scheduled for April 10. Announced cast members included Hurder as Ivy, Caroline Bowman as Karen, Ashmanskas as Nigel, Rodriguez as Tracy, John Behlmann as Jerry, Nielsen as Susan, Jacqueline B. Arnold as Anita, Bella Coppola as Chloe, and Casey Garvin as Charlie. The show closed on June 22, 2025 after 32 preview performances and 84 regular performances.

== Musical numbers ==
Act I

- "Let Me Be Your Star (Bombshell Opening)" – Ivy, Ensemble
- "The National Pastime" – Karen, Ensemble
- "Public Relations" – Ivy, Nigel
- "Second Hand White Baby Grand" – Tracy, Ivy
- "Cut, Print...Moving On" – Ivy, Chloe, Ensemble
- "Mr. & Mrs. Smith" – Ivy, Charlie
- "Don't Say Yes Until I Finish Talking" – Jerry, Ensemble
- "The 20th Century Fox Mambo" – Karen, Ivy, Ensemble
- "Don't Forget Me" – Karen, Ivy
- "(I Wanna Be a) Smash" – Ensemble
- "Let Me Be Your Star" – Chloe

Act II

- "Entr'acte"
- "Let's Be Bad" – Ivy, Ensemble
- "Dig Deep" – Ensemble
- "(Let's Start) Tomorrow Tonight" – Jerry, Ensemble
- "They Just Keep Moving the Line" – Karen
- "I Never Met a Wolf Who Didn't Love to Howl" – Ivy, Ensemble
- "Cut, Print...Moving On (Reprise)" – Chloe, Ivy, Ensemble
- "Second Hand White Baby Grand (Reprise)" – Ivy, Karen
- "Don’t Forget Me (Bombshell Finale)" – Ivy, Ensemble
- "Smash!" – Ensemble

"Never Give All the Heart" is heard as background music in the second act during Jerry's drunken antics.

== Characters and original cast ==
- Ivy Lynn, a well-respected Broadway star, plays Marilyn Monroe in Bombshell
- Nigel Davies, the director and choreographer of Bombshell
- Tracy Morales and Jerry Stevens, the married book writers and songwriters for Bombshell. Jerry is an alcoholic and in therapy.
- Susan Proctor, an eccentric and elderly acting coach that Ivy hires who is dedicated to method acting
- Karen Cartwright, Ivy's best friend and understudy
- Chloe Zervoulian, associate director and choreographer
- Anita Molina Kuperman, the lead producer of Bombshell
- Charlie, Karen's husband, also portrays Joe DiMaggio in Bombshell
- Scott, Anita's assistant who is more knowledgeable in social media than musical theater

Character	Reading	Reading	Staged Reading	Broadway
Character	2022	2023	2024	2025
Ivy Lynn	Megan Hilty	Robyn Hurder	Robyn Hurder	Robyn Hurder
Nigel Davies	Brooks Ashmanskas	Brooks Ashmanskas	Brooks Ashmanskas	Brooks Ashmanskas
Tracy Morales	Krysta Rodriguez	Krysta Rodriguez	Krysta Rodriguez	Krysta Rodriguez
Jerry Stevens	Daniel Breaker	Alex Brightman	Alex Brightman	John Behlmann
Susan Proctor	Kristine Nielsen	Kristine Nielsen	Kristine Nielsen	Kristine Nielsen
Karen Cartwright	Maddie Baillio	Kerry Butler	Jonalyn Saxer	Caroline Bowman
Chloe Zervoulian	Bonnie Milligan	Bonnie Milligan	Bella Coppola	Bella Coppola
Anita Molina Kuperman	Beth Leavel	Vanessa Williams	Yvette Nicole Brown	Jacqueline B. Arnold
Charlie	—N/a	—N/a	Casey Garvin	Casey Garvin
Scott	Christian Thompson	Justin Cooley	Nihar Duvvuri	Nicholas Matos

== Reception ==
Smash received mixed reviews upon its Broadway debut, with critics divided over its adaptation from the cult television series. Jesse Green of The New York Times designated it a Critic's Pick, praising its transformation into "a real musical comedy" and calling it a "reclamation" of the series. Others were less convinced: Jackson McHenry of Vulture criticized its safe, sanitized approach, and Charles Isherwood of The Wall Street Journal found the plot convoluted and repetitive. While some, like David Cote (Observer) and Christian Lewis (Variety), commended the cast and theatrical flair, others, such as Greg Evans (Deadline) and Robert Hofler (The Wrap), took issue with the show's depiction of Marilyn Monroe and an overabundance of show-stopping numbers. Adam Feldman of Time Out New York noted the production "embraces failure" in a self-aware, almost affectionate way, and Kristen Baldwin (Entertainment Weekly) acknowledged its transition from "NBC mess" to Broadway spectacle. Across the board, the score by Marc Shaiman and Scott Wittman garnered praise, but the book and tone drew criticism for lacking cohesion and clarity.

=== Awards and nominations ===
Since a majority of the songs in the production were originally written for the TV series, the production is ineligible for Best Score.

Year	Award	Category	Nominee	Result
2025	Drama League Awards	Outstanding Production of a Musical	Smash	Nominated
2025	Drama League Awards	Outstanding Direction of a Musical	Susan Stroman	Nominated
2025	Drama League Awards	Distinguished Performance	Brooks Ashmanskas	Nominated
2025	Drama League Awards	Distinguished Performance	Robyn Hurder	Nominated
2025	Tony Awards	Best Performance by a Featured Actor in a Musical	Brooks Ashmanskas	Nominated
2025	Tony Awards	Best Choreography	Joshua Bergasse	Nominated
2025	Chita Rivera Awards	Outstanding Dancer in a Broadway Show	Robyn Hurder	Won

== Differences between TV and stage ==
The stage musical is described as a comedy, compared with the more dramatic tone of the series. Ivy is no longer a member of the ensemble looking for her big break as Marilyn, but a seasoned and famous Broadway performer. Karen, instead of being Ivy's main competitor for the role of Marilyn, is her understudy, but the stage version does not focus on the rivalry between the two. Several other characters are renamed in the stage version: Julia is Tracy, book writer and lyricist; Tom is Jerry, composer of the show and married to Tracy; Derek is Nigel, director and choreographer of Bombshell and Eileen is Anita, producer who used to be a dancer.

New characters are introduced in the stage version, such as Susan Proctor, an Actor's Studio teacher; Chloe, a former performer and current associate director/choreographer and Nigel's right hand; Scott, son of a wealthy Bombshell investor; Holly, Bombshell's stage manager; and Charlie, actor/singer/dancer who's married to Karen and plays Joe DiMaggio in Bombshell.
