= Casey Garvin =

American actor

Casey Garvin is an American actor known for his Broadway credits. Originally from New Jersey, he has appeared in numerous theatrical productions, including Peter Pan, Bullets Over Broadway, Miss Saigon, King Kong, Mrs. Doubtfire, Smash, and Some Like It Hot. He has also appeared in films including Hail, Caesar! and Disaster!, and has starred in the film White Christmas.

== Early life ==
Garvin is originally from New Jersey. He completed his high school education online to pursue a full-time performing career.

== Career ==
Garvin's first professional role was in a 2010 production of Peter Pan at the Paper Mill Playhouse when he was 17 years old.

Garvin made his Broadway debut in 2014 in Bullets Over Broadway.

Garvin appeared as a dancer in the 2016 film, Hail, Caesar! In March 2016, Garvin joined the cast of Disaster!, his second Broadway role. From 2017 to 2022, he subsequently was an original cast member in Miss Saigon, King Kong, Mrs. Doubtfire, and Some Like It Hot on Broadway, with roles in the ensemble and as an understudy.

Garvin starred in White Christmas at the Paper Mill Playhouse in 2024.

In 2025, Garvin originated the role of Charlie in Smash on Broadway, marking his seventh Broadway production. Smash began previews in March 2025 and opened on April 10, 2025. After Smash closed in June 2025, he returned to the Imperial Theatre that fall in the ensemble of the 2025 revival of Chess.
