= A Thousand and One Nights (Smash song) =

2012 song by Smash

Single by Smash cast feat. Katharine McPhee & Raza Jaffrey
- Released: April 23, 2012
- Recorded: 2012
- Genre: Pop
- Length: 3:24 (album version)
- Label: Columbia
- Composer: Marc Shaiman
- Lyricists: Marc Shaiman; Scott Wittman
- Producer: Marc Shaiman

Smash cast singles chronology
"Dig Deep" (2012)	"A Thousand and One Nights" (2012)	"Second Hand White Baby Grand" (2012)

"A Thousand and One Nights" is an original song introduced in the twelfth episode of the first season of the musical TV series Smash, entitled "Publicity". It was written by Marc Shaiman and Scott Wittman, but in the episode, it's presented as a character's fantasy of a Bollywood musical number so the songwriter is unnamed.

In the episode, Karen Cartwright (Katharine McPhee and her boyfriend Dev (Raza Jaffrey) are having a tense dinner with movie star Rebecca Duvall (Uma Thurman) at an Indian restaurant. Rebecca has taken over as the lead in the Marilyn Monroe musical Bombshell, while Karen is her understudy. However, Rebecca has taken Karen out for quite a bit of partying, which has caused tensions between Karen and Dev. During the meal, Rebecca and Dev start to argue about who is the one harming Karen. An uncomfortable Karen starts watching a Bollywood movie on one of the screens, and then imagines herself in a Bollywood-style movie with first Dev, then herself singing the song, with practically the entire rest of the main cast and various supporting players of the series performing as backup. The song is sung in the style of an Indian Bollywood song, with the performers dressed in Indian clothes.

== Critical reception ==
TV Is My Pacifier described the number as "all kinds of wrong. I understood how Karen wanted to go to a happy place when a friend and your boyfriend are fighting over you like you aren’t there. But apart from that, the clip of the song was just all kinds of wrong. And I thought Raza Jaffrey got lost in the dancing, while Katherine McPhee did a terrific job."
