= Second Hand White Baby Grand =

2012 American song by Shaiman & Wittman

Single by Smash cast feat. Megan Hilty

from the album Bombshell
- Released: April 23, 2012
- Recorded: 2012
- Genre: Pop
- Length: 4:15 (Album Version)
- Label: Columbia
- Composer: Marc Shaiman
- Lyricists: Marc Shaiman; Scott Wittman
- Producer: Marc Shaiman

Smash cast singles chronology
""A Thousand and One Nights""	"Second Hand White Baby Grand"	""Smash!""

"Second Hand White Baby Grand" is an original song introduced in the twelfth episode of the first season of the musical TV series Smash, entitled "Publicity". The song was written by Marc Shaiman and Scott Wittman. Still, within the show's universe, it is written by songwriting team Julia Houston (Debra Messing) and Tom Levitt (Christian Borle) for their Marilyn Monroe musical Bombshell. The song, with Megan Hilty's vocals, was initially released as a single from iTunes and Amazon.com's MP3 store and is on the cast album Bombshell.

== Context in Smash ==
In "Publicity," the song is written after the newly appointed Marilyn, Rebecca Duvall (Uma Thurman), requests some script changes. The song is performed by Marilyn Monroe's "shadow selves," the voices that she hears inside her head (which are given much larger roles so the movie star but bad singer Rebecca Duvall doesn't have to sing as many songs). Although the song is initially meant for Karen Cartwright (Katharine McPhee), Ivy Lynn (Megan Hilty) plots against her by making Ellis (Jaime Cepero) send her an anonymous text telling her that she is no longer needed in rehearsals, even though she is required to sing the song. With little time to waste, director and choreographer Derek Wills (Jack Davenport) gives the song to Ivy. The song is sung in the rehearsal room (the introduction is Monroe lying on a therapist's chair while the therapist is asking her to remember her mother). As the chair is pushed aside, a movable plank of wood that Ivy is standing on is moved centre stage. The song "bleeds over a montage of domestic activity featuring 'Smash' characters". As soon as Ivy finishes the song, Duvall says that Marilyn (i.e. herself) should sing it.

A reprise of the song is performed in the fourteenth episode, "Previews", as the second last musical number of Bombshell (the last, until "Don't Forget Me" was written) and is performed by Duvall as Monroe as she lies on her bed, dying.

== Production ==
The song is based on a true story about Marilyn Monroe's relationship with her mother and is named after a piano that she inherited from her mother. This is the same piano that Mariah Carey now owns after buying it at an auction.

BroadwayWorld comments, "The tune is a tribute to Marilyn Monroe's most prized possession, her family's white baby grand piano that was auctioned off after her mother was committed to a psych ward."

In a 1999 auction of "The Personal Property of Marilyn Monroe" the description for the piano read:

The white lacquered piano is early-20th century, unknown American manufacturer. …The piano originally belonged to Marilyn Monroe's mother, Gladys. After the star's mother was institutionalized, the piano was sold and it would take years of searching for Marilyn to finally locate the piano and buy it back. Her sentimental attachment to this instrument is documented in the 1974 book, published posthumously, 'My Story' by Marilyn Monroe, in Chapter One entitled 'How I Rescued A White Piano.'

In an interview, Shaiman commented, "it is the only song [the duo] wrote without it being specifically for an episode. The story was just so good; it inspired us." Wittman added: "It's the nearest and dearest to our hearts." He also explained that "for her entire life, she was looking for this piano until she found it at another auction and repurchased it. It was the one thing she kept with her [until her death]. It was in her New York apartment when she died."

== Critical reception ==
Playbill describes the song as "ruminative, poetic, sentimental, elliptical, sad [and] is one of the most ambitious original songs in the series". It notes that the song's contents are not directly related to the goings-on of the Smash characters but acknowledges that "it adds musical variety and emotional depth to the musical drama being penned by Tom and Julia [and therefore] you take these writers more seriously". It draws comparisons with other "ambitious" songs such as "Back to Before" from Ragtime, "Kiss of the Spider Woman" from the musical of the same name, "I Know Where I've Been" from Hairspray and "So Anyway" from Next to Normal.

=== Release history ===
Region	Date	Format	Label
United States	April 23, 2012	Digital download - Digital Single	Columbia Records
