= Understudy (Smash) =

- Smash episode
- Episode no.: Season 1 Episode 10
- Directed by: Adam Bernstein
- Written by: Jerome Hairston
- Original air date: April 9, 2012

Guest appearances
- Uma Thurman as Rebecca Duvall; Neal Bledsoe as John Goodwin; Emory Cohen as Leo Houston; Thorsten Kaye as Nick; Leslie Odom, Jr. as Sam Strickland; Terrence Mann as Randy Cobra; Sean Dugan as Randall Jones; Charlie Semine as Paul Denby

Episode chronology
← Previous "Hell on Earth"	Next → "The Movie Star"
- Smash (season 1)

"Understudy" is the tenth episode of the American television series, Smash. The episode was broadcast on April 9, 2012.

== Plot ==
Rebecca Duvall (Uma Thurman) is stuck in Cuba, which leads to some potential financial backers giving Eileen (Anjelica Huston) only two days to get Duvall if she wants their money, and Derek (Jack Davenport) to have Karen (Katharine McPhee) be the Marilyn understudy in the meantime so that staging can continue.

Dev (Raza Jaffrey) doesn't get the promotion to press secretary he was hoping for, but instead of telling Karen, he turns to R.J. (Tala Ashe) for comfort. Derek is rough on Karen when she makes an amateur mistake, but when Ivy later points out that it's more productive to coddle the lead than yell, Derek takes note. Karen lets it slip to Dev that Derek sexually harassed her when she first auditioned for Marilyn, and Dev becomes jealous starts a fight over her not telling him. Later, when Karen criticizes a line at rehearsal, Derek starts visualizing her as Marilyn. Derek shows up at Karen's apartment that night to congratulate her on such a good job, and apologize for sexually harassing her when they first met. When Derek leaves, he runs into Dev, and the two get into a fistfight. Dev tells Karen he doesn't want her to ever see Derek anymore. Karen sings "Never Give All the Heart" at rehearsal the next day, mesmerizing everyone, but Rebecca Duvall shows up moments later.

Nick (Thorsten Kaye) introduces Eileen to Randy Cobra (Terrance Mann), a friend of his. Randy becomes the new investor for the show, and Nick and Eileen's relationship heats up. Ivy (Megan Hilty) has a hard time getting a job after her previous drugged performance in the ensemble of 'Heaven on Earth', so she decides to play nice with everyone, including Karen, in hopes of getting back into the show.

Julia (Debra Messing) and Tom (Christian Borle) celebrate their anniversary by going to a production of the first play they wrote together. When Tom makes a speech in front of the audience about how grateful he is for Julia, she walks out of the theater. Later, in the parking lot, Julia breaks down and tells Tom that Frank left her and is refusing to talk to her. John (Neal Bledsoe) realizes that Tom has feelings for Sam (Leslie Odom, Jr.), and breaks the relationship off.

== Production ==
Uma Thurman was first announced to appear on Smash on December 8, 2011. The press release stated that she would appear in a story arc spanning five episodes as a movie star interested in the role of Marilyn Monroe. Terrence Mann also guest-starred in the episode, as an aging burned-out rock star who becomes a major investor in "Bombshell".

The episode includes Katharine McPhee's version of "Never Give All the Heart", which was first sung by Megan Hilty in the pilot. It also included "Don't Say Yes Until I Finish Talking", a song meant for Darryl F. Zanuck, which Christian Borle sings as Tom Levitt when the actor playing Zanuck does not show up.

During this episode Megan Hilty's character Ivy Lynn is seen walking down W 43rd Street with a view of Hotel Carter and gentleman's club Cheetah's New York in the background.
