= Some Like It Hot (musical) =

2022 musical

- Broadway promotional poster
- Music: Marc Shaiman
- Lyrics: Marc Shaiman; Scott Wittman
- Book: Matthew López; Amber Ruffin
- Basis: Some Like It Hot by Billy Wilder; I. A. L. Diamond; Robert Thoeren; Michael Logan; Fanfare of Love by Max Bronnet; Michael Logan; Pierre Prévert; René Pujol; Robert Thoeren
- Premiere: December 11, 2022: Shubert Theatre
- Productions: 2022 Broadway; 2024 North American Tour; 2025 West End

Some Like It Hot is a 2022 musical comedy with music by Marc Shaiman, lyrics by Scott Wittman and Shaiman, and a book by Matthew López and Amber Ruffin. It is based on the 1959 MGM/UA feature film Some Like It Hot, which in turn was based on the 1935 French film Fanfare of Love. The musical, like the film, follows the story of a pair of male musicians who disguise themselves as women to escape from gangsters after witnessing a murder.

The show received positive reviews from critics, and went on to receive a leading 13 nominations at the 76th Tony Awards, including Best Musical, with J. Harrison Ghee getting a nomination for and subsequently winning Best Leading Actor in a Musical. This makes Ghee one of the two first openly non-binary performers to be nominated for and win a Tony Award.

== Plot ==
=== Act I ===
In 1933, right before the end of Prohibition, Chicago speakeasy performer Sweet Sue is arrested in a raid ("What Are You Thirsty For?"). After being bailed out of jail, Sue decides to form an all-female band that will tour the western U.S., playing its final engagement in San Diego. Meanwhile, the club's saxophonist Joe and bass player Jerry, desperately in need of a paycheck, seek out a job with Spats Colombo, the proprietor of the Cheetah Club and a powerful gangster. Colombo's hiring manager is impressed by Joe and Jerry's musical abilities, but only offers to hire Joe; the manager is prejudiced against Black people and therefore refuses to hire Jerry. Joe and Jerry explain that Jerry's parents raised Joe after his own outlaw parents abandoned him, and as such, they come as a package deal ("You Can't Have Me (If You Don't Have Him)"). Colombo, impressed by their tap dancing act, "The Tip-Tap Twins", agrees to hire them both.

That evening, Colombo receives a tip from FBI Agent Mulligan that he will be arrested imminently if he doesn't turn state's evidence. Suspecting he has been betrayed, Colombo calls Toothpick Charlie and two of his associates into his office and has them shot. At this moment, Joe and Jerry walk in and witness the murder. Fleeing from Colombo’s goons, the pair find themselves in a women's dressing room. Joe makes a plan: he and Jerry will disguise themselves as women and join Sweet Sue's band to get to San Diego, then flee to Mexico. Jerry is doubtful that Joe's plan will work, but seeing no alternative, he goes along with the plan. ("Vamp!")

The next day, Joe and Jerry arrive at the train station as the band is departing, posing as two music students named Josephine and Daphne. Sweet Sue hires them to replace the original sax and bass player, whose instruments were dumped in the river by Joe and Jerry. The last to arrive is the band's singer, Sugar Kane ("I'm California Bound"). On the train, Sugar confesses to Josephine and Daphne that she is joining the all-female band because of her weakness for male musicians, particularly saxophone players ("A Darker Shade of Blue").

As the show travels west, Josephine, Daphne and Sugar develop a new version of the Tip-Tap Twins act, "The Tip-Tap Trio." ("Take It Up A Step") Joe, who struggles to fit in as Josephine, marvels at Jerry’s ease in behaving femininely as he leads the girls in telling off a greedy bar manager ("Zee Bap"). Sugar and Josephine grow closer, and Sugar shares her childhood dreams of movie stardom ("At the Old Majestic Nickel Matinee"). Joe begins to fall for Sugar. Meanwhile, Colombo recognizes the Tip-Tap Trio as Joe and Jerry's act.

The band arrives at the Hotel del Coronado in San Diego. The hotel's owner, Osgood Fielding III, an eccentric millionaire in search of love, takes an immediate interest in Daphne ("Poor Little Millionaire"). Joe insists to Jerry that they flee to Mexico immediately, but Jerry doesn't want to leave the band yet, feeling more at home as Daphne than he ever has. Joe attempts to escape alone by stealing the luggage of Austrian screenwriter Kip von der Plotz, but bumps into Sugar. Impersonating Kip, he woos her, and she invites him to see her perform that evening. When Kip shows up in place of Josephine that night, Sugar and Daphne perform the act as a duo. Daphne angrily eyes "Kip" from the stage while Osgood admires her. Colombo arrives in town, with Agent Mulligan hot on his tail ("Some Like It Hot").

=== Act II ===
The performance ends, and Kip invites Sugar out after the show. Sweet Sue storms into Josephine and Daphne's room, demanding to know why Josephine missed the performance. Still dressed as Kip from the shoulders down but covered by a blanket, Josephine explains that she was waylaid by food poisoning. Osgood visits Daphne, and Josephine convinces him to take Daphne out so "Kip" can use his yacht without Osgood knowing. Osgood convinces a reluctant Daphne to come with him to Mexico, and Daphne receives a makeover from the other girls ("Let's Be Bad"). On the yacht, Sugar falls in love with Kip and teaches him how to dance, fantasizing about the movies they’d make together ("Let's Dance the World Away").

In Mexico, Osgood explains to Daphne that his father, Osgood Fielding II, was disowned by Osgood I for falling in love with a Mexican barmaid, Osgood's mother. Though Osgood II regained his fortune by inventing root beer, it left Osgood III with a feeling of a dual identity, his Mexican name being Pedro Francisco Alvarez. Daphne is inspired by his allegorical story about a caterpillar becoming a butterfly, and Osgood proposes ("Fly, Mariposa, Fly").

Returning early the next morning, Daphne tells Joe that she is both Jerry and Daphne and that she is engaged to Osgood ("You Could've Knocked Me Over With a Feather"). Daphne also encourages Joe to be honest with himself. Realizing that Sugar can never love someone she doesn't know, Joe resolves to be a better friend to Daphne and tell Sugar the truth ("He Lied When He Said Hello"). Sweet Sue introduces the band to their new investor, Colombo, and later walks in on Joe out of disguise. They explain the whole story, and she agrees to keep their secret until the end of the show, at which point they will flee to Mexico. Sue also encourages Joe to let Sugar down easy without endangering her life.

Josephine informs Sugar that Kip left a note breaking up with her. Heartbroken and with her dream in tatters, Sugar nevertheless performs ("Ride Out the Storm"). Colombo and his associates recognize the trio's dancing and Joe unmasks himself, stunning Sugar. The gangsters and the FBI chase the trio through the hotel. Eventually, Agent Mulligan, dressed as Josephine, is able to corner and arrest Colombo ("Tip-Tap Trouble"). Joe testifies against Colombo without implicating Daphne.

Sugar is furious at Joe's multiple deceptions, but she comes to realize that she did have real affection for Josephine and Kip and does indeed love Joe. Joe offers to be Sugar’s agent and go with her to Hollywood to make up for his deceptions. Sweet Sue is glad everyone is okay, but upset that the band has lost their investor, prompting Osgood to offer his investment instead. Daphne tries to admit the truth to Osgood, but he assures her that he understands and still considers her perfect, even if Daphne counters that "nobody's perfect." Sometime later, the 21st amendment is ratified, ending Prohibition. Daphne marries Osgood, Sugar has become a movie star for MGM, and Osgood opens a club called "Daphnecita's," where Daphne and Joe continue to perform together every night ("Baby, Let's Get Good").

== Production history ==
=== Broadway (2022-23) ===
The musical was originally scheduled to have its out-of-town engagement in Chicago at the Cadillac Palace Theatre, but was later announced that the engagement was canceled due to the COVID-19 pandemic.

The show began previews at the Shubert Theatre on Broadway on November 1, 2022, with an opening night on December 11, directed by Casey Nicholaw and features Christian Borle as Joe/Josephine, Kevin Del Aguila as Osgood, J. Harrison Ghee as Jerry/Daphne, and Adrianna Hicks as Sugar. The show received mostly positive reviews from the critics. On March 23, 2023, due to a large absence of cast members and understudies, director and choreographer Casey Nicholaw filled in for Lotito as Spats.

In May 2023, the show received 13 Tony Award nominations, more than any of the 2022 season, including Best Musical. At the 76th Tony Awards, the show won four awards including Best Choreography and Best Leading Actor for Ghee.

The show played its final performance on December 30, 2023.

=== North American Tour (2024-26) ===
In May 2023, it was announced that the Broadway production would embark on a North American national tour in the fall of 2024. The cities include (but are not limited to) Chicago, Cleveland, St. Louis, San Diego, Seattle, San Francisco, and Boston. The tour launched in September 2024 at Proctors Theatre in Schenectady, New York. The tour then moved to the Ed Mirvish Theatre in Toronto, Ontario on February 9, 2026.

=== West End (TBA) ===
Following the announcement that the Broadway production would be closing, it was announced that the production was scheduled transfer to London's West End. Specific dates, casting, and venue are still to be announced.

== Cast and characters ==
Characters	Broadway	First National Tour
Characters	2022	2024
Joe/Josephine/Kip	Christian Borle	Matt Loehr
Jerry/Daphne	J. Harrison Ghee	Tavis Kordell
Gertrude "Sugar Kane" Mudd	Adrianna Hicks	Leandra Ellis-Gaston
Osgood Fielding III/ Pedro Francisco Alvarez	Kevin Del Aguila	Edward Juvier
Sweet Sue	NaTasha Yvette Williams	Tarra Conner Jones
Agent Mulligan	Adam Heller	Jamie LaVerdiere
Spats Colombo	Mark Lotito	Devon Goffman
Minnie	Angie Schworer	Devon Hadsell
Mack	Casey Garvin	Tommy Sutter
Sonny	Jarvis B. Manning	Jay Owens

== Musical numbers ==
Act I

- "What Are You Thirsty For?" - Sue & Ensemble
- "You Can't Have Me (If You Don't Have Him)" - Joe & Jerry
- "Vamp!" - Joe & Jerry
- "I'm California Bound" - Sue, Joe, Jerry, Sugar & Ensemble
- "A Darker Shade of Blue" - Sugar
- "Take It Up A Step" - Sugar, Josephine, Daphne, & Ensemble
- "Zee Bap" - Sue, Daphne, & Female Ensemble
- "At the Old Majestic Nickel Matinee" - Sugar
- "Poor Little Millionaire" - Osgood & Ensemble
- "Some Like It Hot" - Sue, Sugar, Daphne & Ensemble

Act II

- "Let's Be Bad" - Osgood, Daphne, & Ensemble
- "Let's Dance the World Away" - Joe, Sugar, Ensemble
- "Fly, Mariposa, Fly" - Osgood & Male Ensemble
- "You Could've Knocked Me Over With a Feather" - Daphne
- "He Lied When He Said Hello" - Joe & Female Ensemble
- "Ride Out the Storm" - Sugar
- "Tip Tap Trouble" - Company †
- "Baby, Let's Get Good" - Company

Notes:

† Not included in the cast recording

=== Recordings ===
The original cast album featuring the musical numbers performed by the theatre cast was released through Concord Theatricals on March 10, 2023. At the 66th Annual Grammy Awards, it won the Best Musical Theater Album.

== Awards and nominations ==
=== 2022 Broadway production ===
Year	Award	Category	Nominee	Result
2023	Tony Awards	Best Musical		Nominated
2023	Tony Awards	Best Book of a Musical	Matthew López and Amber Ruffin	Nominated
2023	Tony Awards	Best Original Score	Marc Shaiman and Scott Wittman	Nominated
2023	Tony Awards	Best Direction of a Musical	Casey Nicholaw	Nominated
2023	Tony Awards	Best Actor in a Musical	Christian Borle	Nominated
2023	Tony Awards	Best Actor in a Musical	J. Harrison Ghee	Won
2023	Tony Awards	Best Featured Actor in a Musical	Kevin del Aguila	Nominated
2023	Tony Awards	Best Featured Actress in a Musical	NaTasha Yvette Williams	Nominated
2023	Tony Awards	Best Scenic Design of a Musical	Scott Pask	Nominated
2023	Tony Awards	Best Costume Design of a Musical	Gregg Barnes	Won
2023	Tony Awards	Best Lighting Design of a Musical	Natasha Katz	Nominated
2023	Tony Awards	Best Choreography	Casey Nicholaw	Won
2023	Tony Awards	Best Orchestrations	Charlie Rosen and Bryan Carter	Won
2023	Drama Desk Awards	Outstanding Musical		Won
2023	Drama Desk Awards	Outstanding Book of a Musical	Matthew López and Amber Ruffin	Won
2023	Drama Desk Awards	Outstanding Lyrics	Scott Whittman and Marc Shaiman	Won
2023	Drama Desk Awards	Outstanding Lead Performance in a Musical	J. Harrison Ghee	Won
2023	Drama Desk Awards	Outstanding Featured Performance in a Musical	Kevin Del Aguila	Won
2023	Drama Desk Awards	Outstanding Costume Design of a Musical	Gregg Barnes	Won
2023	Drama Desk Awards	Outstanding Choreography	Casey Nicholaw	Won
2023	Drama Desk Awards	Outstanding Orchestrations	Charlie Rosen and Bryan Carter	Won
2023	Drama League Awards	Distinguished Performance	J. Harrison Ghee	Nominated
2023	Drama League Awards	Outstanding Production of a Musical		Won
2023	Drama League Awards	Outstanding Direction of a Musical	Casey Nicholaw	Nominated
2023	Outer Critics Circle Awards	Outstanding New Broadway Musical		Won
2023	Outer Critics Circle Awards	Outstanding Book of a Musical	Matthew López and Amber Ruffin	Nominated
2023	Outer Critics Circle Awards	Outstanding New Score	Marc Shaiman and Scott Wittman	Won
2023	Outer Critics Circle Awards	Outstanding Director of a Musical	Casey Nicholaw	Nominated
2023	Outer Critics Circle Awards	Outstanding Lead Performer in a Broadway Musical	J. Harrison Ghee	Won
2023	Outer Critics Circle Awards	Outstanding Featured Performer in a Broadway Musical	Kevin Del Aguila	Nominated
2023	Outer Critics Circle Awards	Outstanding Featured Performer in a Broadway Musical	NaTasha Yvette Williams	Nominated
2023	Outer Critics Circle Awards	Outstanding Costume Design	Gregg Barnes	Won
2023	Outer Critics Circle Awards	Outstanding Orchestrations	Bryan Carter and Charlie Rosen	Won
2023	Outer Critics Circle Awards	Outstanding Choreography	Casey Nicholaw	Nominated
2023	Chita Rivera Awards	Outstanding Choreography in a Broadway Show	Casey Nicholaw	Nominated
2023	Chita Rivera Awards	Outstanding Dancer in a Broadway Show	J. Harrison Ghee	Nominated
2023	Chita Rivera Awards	Outstanding Ensemble in a Broadway Show		Nominated
2023	Grammy Award	Best Musical Theatre Album		Won
2023	Dorian Awards	Outstanding Broadway Musical		Nominated

== See also ==
- Sugar, 1972 musical based on the same source material
