= Hell on Earth (Smash) =

- Smash episode
- Episode no.: Season 1 Episode 9
- Directed by: Paul McGuigan
- Written by: Scott Burkhardt
- Original air date: April 2, 2012

Guest appearances
- Norbert Leo Butz as himself; Will Chase as Michael Swift; Neal Bledsoe as John Goodwin; Emory Cohen as Leo Houston; Leslie Odom, Jr. as Sam Strickland; Sean Dugan as Randall

Episode chronology
← Previous "The Coup"	Next → "Understudy"
- Smash (season 1)

"Hell on Earth" is the ninth episode of the American television series, Smash. The episode aired on April 2, 2012.

== Plot ==
Karen (Katharine McPhee) and Ivy (Megan Hilty) both vie for an orange juice commercial, and Karen wins out, which only accentuates how unhappy Ivy is at having to go back to the ensemble of Heaven on Earth. Sam (Leslie Odom, Jr.) shows concern for how many pills Ivy's taking, but she brushes it off as simply part of taking Prednisone. But Ivy takes more and more pills to deal with life, leading her to be high while performing Heaven on Earth, and after falling down from her buzz, get kicked off the stage by the lead. Karen sees the performance while trying to return the Marc Jacobs sunglasses she accidentally swapped with Ivy at the orange juice audition, and after yelling at each other, the pair end up drinking together and bonding.

Eileen (Anjelica Huston) searches for a star to come on board the production, even though no one else really wants a star. Ellis (Jaime Cepero) chases Rebecca Duvall (Uma Thurman) for the production in the hopes that Eileen will make him co-producer. Eileen rejects the idea of Ellis as co-producer, but tries to make a deal with Rebecca Duvall. After Derek (Jack Davenport) tells Eileen that he wants to take on other projects for a year while Tom and Julia finish writing the book for the show, Eileen searches for another director in the hopes that Derek will find out, and be scared back into committing to the show; her plan works perfectly.

Julia (Debra Messing) breathes a sigh of relief that her affair with Michael (Will Chase) is over, only to immediately be confronted by Frank (Brian D'Arcy James), who has discovered the affair. When Frank confronts Michael, Michael tells Frank about the original affair, and Frank punches Michael. Frank moves out of the apartment. Julia runs into Michael, and explains how she has to take responsibility for the mess she created. Meanwhile, Tom (Christian Borle) finds out the man he's dating, John (Neal Bledsoe), is a Republican, and has a hard time reconciling how much he likes his boyfriend with how much he hates Republicans. Tom and Julia settle on 'Bombshell' as the new name of the show.

== Production ==
Michael Riedel, the theatre critic for the New York Post, who was referred to by name in the pilot, had a brief cameo as himself in the episode. Two-time Tony award winner Norbert Leo Butz appeared as himself playing the lead role in Heaven on Earth.

The episode included a cover version of Rihanna's "Cheers (Drink to That)" performed by Megan Hilty and Katharine McPhee.

The song "The Higher You Get, the Farther the Fall" is partially performed twice in the episode. The full performance of the song (from the first instance it's performed where Ivy is bored) is available as an extended scene for the episode in the DVD set for the first season of the show.

== Critical reception ==
The A.V. Club gave the episode a B+ rating, describing it as "better than anything the show has done since the pilot."
