= The National Pastime =

Single by Smash cast feat. Megan Hilty

from the album Bombshell
- Released: January 16, 2012
- Recorded: 2012
- Genre: Pop
- Length: 2:32 (Album Version)
- Label: Columbia
- Composer: Marc Shaiman
- Lyricists: Marc Shaiman; Scott Wittman
- Producer: Marc Shaiman

Smash cast singles chronology
| ""Never Give All the Heart"" | "The National Pastime" | ""Let Me Be Your Star"" |

"The National Pastime" is an original song introduced in the first episode of the first season of the musical TV series Smash, entitled "Pilot". The song was written by Marc Shaiman and Scott Wittman, but in the show's universe, it was written by songwriting duo Tom Levitt (Christian Borle) and Julia Houston (Debra Messing) for their Marilyn Monroe musical Bombshell.

In the episode, Ivy Lynn (Megan Hilty) performs this baseball number, choreographed by director and choreographer Derek Wills (Jack Davenport), with a male ensemble in front of producer Eileen Rand (Anjelica Huston), Derek, Tom and Julia as an audition for Derek to see if Tom and Julia want to work with him.

The song is reprised in the workshop medley of the first season's seventh episode entitled "The Workshop" by Ivy, and by Karen Cartwright (Katharine McPhee) in the seventh episode of the second season "Musical Chairs".

The song was originally released as a single at digital music retailers and is available as a track on the cast album Bombshell.

== Production ==
DFW.com describes the number as "Marilyn, now in love with Joe DiMaggio, tries to 'understand' baseball in a song laced with double-entendres". The scene cuts between "rehearsal-hall test and what the Broadway show might look like when fully lit and costumed."

== Critical reception ==
Although Dodger Thoughts describes the performers as "enthusiastic" and full of "barely bridled sexuality," it notes that "corny doesn’t begin to describe [the number]," and concludes by saying "'The National Pastime' is a big fat swing, leg-kick and a miss." Dan from TV Fanatic named the song as his favourite from the pilot, saying it "blew [him] away". Brittany Frederick of Starpulse.com comments that she "can't warm to [the song] for some reason." Andy Swift of HollywoodLife describes "The National Pastime" as a "show-stopping number." DFW.com comments that "the song is staged with the razzmatazz that marks the best Broadway numbers, and when Hilty and a group of male dancers perform it, Smash begins to catch fire."

=== Release history ===
| Region | Date | Format | Label |
|---|---|---|---|
| United States | January 16, 2012 | Digital download - Digital Single | Columbia Records |
| United States | February 6, 2012 | Digital download - Digital Single | Columbia Records |
