= Cagny =

Cagny is the name of two communes in France:

- Cagny, Calvados
- Cagny, Somme

== See also ==
- Cagney, a surname
