= Glen Kelly =

Glen Kelly is a music arranger and composer. He is best known for his dance music and for his musical theatre arrangements for Broadway shows including Beauty and the Beast, The Producers, Young Frankenstein, Spamalot, The Drowsy Chaperone, The Book of Mormon and Aladdin.

== Career ==
Kelly is a self-taught musician, who began his career working as a rehearsal pianist and musical director the San Francisco show Beach Blanket Babylon. He moved to New York in the early 1980s. Kelly has had a long professional association with Mel Brooks and Susan Stroman, notably on the Broadway musicals The Producers (2001–2007) and Young Frankenstein (2007–2009).

His other arrangements for musicals and his incidental music for plays include Dance a Little Closer (1983), The Tap Dance Kid (1983–1985), Beauty and the Beast (1994–2007), Steel Pier (1997), High Society (1998), The Frogs (2004), Spamalot (2005–2009), The Drowsy Chaperone (2006–2007), All About Me (2010), The Scottsboro Boys (2010), The Book of Mormon (2011–present), Death of a Salesman (2012 revival), A Christmas Story: The Musical (2012), The Nance (2013; Drama Desk Award for Outstanding Music in a Play), Aladdin (2014–present), Bullets Over Broadway (2014), and Something Rotten! (2015).
