= Don't You Forget About Me =

Don't You Forget About Me may refer to:

- "Don't You (Forget About Me)", a 1985 song by Simple Minds
- Don't You Forget About Me (novel), a 2007 novel in Cecily von Ziegesar's Gossip Girl series
- Don't You Forget About Me (film), a 2009 Canadian documentary film about John Hughes
- "Don't You Forget About Me" (Missing You), a 2025 television episode
