= SMASH (hash) =

General
- Designers: Lars R. Knudsen
- First published: 2005

Detail
- Digest sizes: 256 or 512 bits

Best public cryptanalysis
- Collision, Second Preimage

SMASH is a cryptographic hash function which was created by Lars R. Knudsen. SMASH comes in two versions: 256-bit and 512-bit. Each version was supposed to rival SHA-256 and SHA-512, respectively, however, shortly after the SMASH presentation at FSE 2005, an attack vector against SMASH was discovered which left the hash broken.

== Specifications ==
The message length was limited to less than 2^{128} for SMASH-256 and 2^{256} for SMASH-512.

== Definition ==
Input: 256/512-bit message blocks $m_1, m_2, ... ,m_t$ and $\theta \in GF(2^n)$

- $h_0 = f(iv) \oplus iv$
- $h_i = h(h_{i-1},m_i) = f(h_{i_1}\oplus m_i) \oplus m_i \oplus \theta m_i$
- $h_{t+1} = f(h_t) \oplus h_t$

The function f is a complex compression function consisting of H-Rounds and L-Rounds using S-boxes, linear diffusion and variable rotations, details can be found here

== Details ==
The S-boxes in SMASH are derived versions from the Serpent ones.
