= Brooks Ashmanskas =

American stage actor

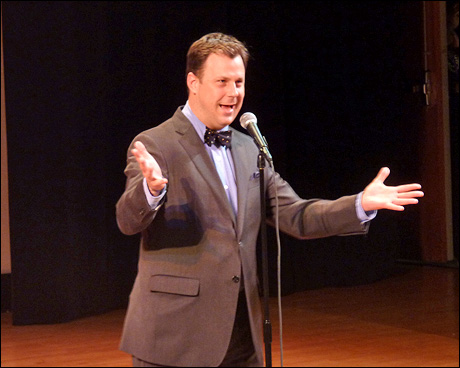
- Ashmanskas in 2009
- Born: June 14, 1969 (age 57); Salem, Oregon, U.S.
- Education: Bennington College
- Occupation: Actor
- Years active: 1995−present

Brooks Ashmanskas (born June 14, 1969) is an American actor. He has appeared both on Broadway and Off-Broadway as well as in regional theatres. Ashmanskas has done limited film and television work, appearing in the 2022 Netflix series Uncoupled. He received Tony Award and Drama Desk Award nominations for playing various characters in Martin Short: Fame Becomes Me (2006), Barry Glickman in The Prom (2018), and Nigel Davies in Smash (2025).

== Early life ==
Ashmanskas is originally from Salem, Oregon, but grew up in Beaverton, just outside of Portland. He is of Lithuanian descent. He graduated from Bennington College. He is openly gay.

== Career ==
=== Off-Broadway and Broadway ===
Ashmanskas was in the original productions of Dream (1997), Songs for a New World (Off-Broadway, 1995) and the Broadway revival of Gypsy: A Musical Fable (2003). He was a replacement "Carmen Ghia", starting in 2004, in The Producers, occasionally acting opposite original Carmen Ghia actor Roger Bart as Leo Bloom.

In 2006, he played several characters in the Broadway production of Martin Short: Fame Becomes Me, for which he received a Tony Award nomination, Best Performance By a Featured Actor in a Musical.

He appeared in the Broadway revival of The Ritz as Chris in 2007. He played the character of Mr. Dobitch in the 2010 Broadway revival of Promises, Promises. Also in 2010 he appeared in the Broadway revival of Present Laughter. He starred as the title character Off-Broadway in the New Group production of Clive at the Acorn Theatre in January 2013 through March 2013.

Ashmanskas appeared in the stage musical adaption of Bullets Over Broadway, which opened on Broadway in April 2014. In March 2015 he originated the role of Brother Jeremiah in Something Rotten! on Broadway. In 2016, he appeared in Shuffle Along, or, the Making of the Musical Sensation of 1921 and All That Followed.

He starred as Barry Glickman in the original Broadway production of The Prom, which opened in October 2018 at the Longacre Theatre, for which he was nominated for a 2019 Tony Award for Best Performance by an Actor in a Leading Role in a Musical.

In 2025, Ashmankas originated the role of Nigel in the Broadway production of Smash. He received a Tony nomination for his portrayal of Nigel, the director of the show.

=== Regional theatre ===
He appeared in the Arena Stage production of Animal Crackers in 1999.

He has performed at the Huntington Theatre Company, Boston, in Present Laughter in 2007 and in She Loves Me in May and June 2008 (which transferred to the Williamstown Theatre Festival in June and July). He appeared in God of Carnage in 2012 as Alan. His appearances at the Williamstown Theatre Festival, Williamstown, Massachusetts, include She Loves Me in 2008,Knickerbocker in 2009 and in July and August 2013 in a new musical, Johnny Baseball.

In 2008, he participated in a staged concert presentation of "Broadway: Three Generations" at the Kennedy Center, appearing in Girl Crazy and Bye Bye Birdie. He performed in Burn This as "Larry" at the Mark Taper Forum, Los Angeles, in 2011.

He appeared in the musical 1776 as John Adams at the Ford's Theatre, Washington, D.C., in 2012.

== Credits ==
=== Theatre ===
Year	Show	Role	Notes
1995	Songs for a New World	Man 2	off-Broadway
1995	How to Succeed in Business Without Really Trying	Bud Frump	Broadway, 1995 – 1996
1997	Dream	Performer	Broadway, Apr 3 – July 6, 1997
1998	Little Me	Pinchley Junior/Steward/Assistant Director/Doctor	Broadway, November 12, 1998 – February 7, 1999
1999	Animal Crackers	Unknown	Arena Stage
2000	On a Clear Day You Can See Forever	Performer	NY City Center, February 2000
2001	Amphitryon	Sosia	Huntington Theatre Company, Mar 9 – April 8, 2001
2003	Gypsy	Mr. Goldstone/Pastey	Broadway, May 1, 2003 – May 20, 2004
2004	A Midsummer Night's Dream	Francis Flute	Williamstown Theatre Festival, July 14–25, 2004
2004	The Producers	Carmen Ghia	Broadway, 2004 - 2006
2006	Martin Short: Fame Becomes Me	Comedy All Star	Broadway, August 17, 2006 – January 7, 2007
2007	Present Laughter	Roland Maule	Huntington Theatre Company
2007	The Ritz	Chris	Broadway, Oct 11 – December 9, 2007
2008	Broadway: Three Generations	Performer	Kennedy Center
2008	She Loves Me	Georg Nowack	Huntington Theatre Company, May/June 2008
2008	She Loves Me	Georg Nowack	Williamstown Theatre Festival, July/August 2008
2008	A Flea in Her Ear	Dr. Finache	Williamstown Theatre Festival, August 2008
2009	Rich and Famous	Bing	American Conservatory Theater - SF, Jan/Feb 2009
2009	Knickerbocker	Unknown	Williamstown Theatre Festival
2009	She Stoops to Conquer	Tony Lumpkin	McCarter Theater, Oct.13 - November 1, 2009
2010	Present Laughter	Roland Maule	Broadway, Jan 21 – March 21, 2010
2010	Promises, Promises	Mr. Dobitch	Broadway, April 25, 2010 – January 2, 2011
2011	Burn This	Larry	Mark Taper Forum
2012	1776	John Adams	Ford's Theatre
2012	God of Carnage	Alan	Huntington Theatre Company
2013	Clive	Clive	Off-Broadway, Jan. – March 2013
2013	Johnny Baseball	Unknown	Williamstown Theatre Festival, July/August 2013
2014	Bullets Over Broadway	Warner Purcell	Broadway, Apr 10 – August 24, 2014
2015	Absurd Person Singular	Sidney	Two River Theater, Jan 5 – February 1, 2015
2015	Something Rotten!	Brother Jeremiah	Broadway, April 22, 2015 – January 13, 2016
2016	Shuffle Along, or the Making of the Musical Sensation of 1921	Al/Izzy/Mr. Broadway/Carlo	Music Box Theatre, Broadway
2016	The Prom	Barry Glickman	Alliance Theatre
2017	Sunday in the Park with George	Mr./Charles	Hudson Theatre, Broadway
2018	The Prom	Barry Glickman	Longacre Theatre, Broadway
2020	Joseph and the Amazing Technicolor Dreamcoat	Baker	David Geffen Hall
2024	Once Upon a Mattress	Wizard	Hudson Theatre, Broadway
2025	Smash	Nigel Davies	Imperial Theatre, Broadway
2026	Are You Now or Have You Ever Been	Man 2 (Edward Dmytryk, Tony Kraber, Martin Berkeley)	New York City Center Stage I, Off-Broadway
2026	The Imaginary Invalid	Dr. Diafoirus/Purgon	Todd Haimes Theatre, Broadway

=== Film ===
Year	Title	Role	Notes
2009	Julie & Julia	Mr. Misher	
2022	Better Nate Than Ever	Casting Director	
2022	Forty Winks	Automated Message	
2024	A Family Affair	Dr. Randy	
2025	Atrabilious	Todd Jenkins	

=== Television ===
Year	Title	Role	Notes
2007	All My Children	Leon	2 episodes
2012–14	The Good Wife	Judge Greg Brochard	2 episodes
2019	Tales of the City	Guest	Episode: "The Price of Oil"
2020	The Good Lord Bird	Lewis Washington	2 episodes
2022	The Last Movie Stars	Gore Vidal (voice)	5 episodes
2022	Uncoupled	Stanley James	Main cast
2022	The Good Fight	Judge Greg Brochard	Episode: "The End of Football"

== Awards and nominations ==
Year	Award	Category	Nominee	Result
2007	Tony Award	Best Featured Actor in a Musical	Martin Short: Fame Becomes Me	Nominated
2007	Drama Desk Award	Outstanding Featured Actor in a Musical	Martin Short: Fame Becomes Me	Nominated
2019	Tony Award	Best Actor in a Musical	The Prom	Nominated
2019	Drama Desk Award	Outstanding Actor in a Musical	The Prom	Nominated
2019	Drama League Award	Distinguished Performance	The Prom	Nominated
2019	Outer Critics Circle Award	Outstanding Actor in a Musical	The Prom	Nominated
2025	Tony Award	Best Featured Actor in a Musical	Smash	Nominated
2025	Drama Desk Award	Outstanding Featured Performance in a Musical	Smash	Won
2025	Drama League Award	Distinguished Performance	Smash	Nominated
