= Smash (TV series) =

2012 American television series

- Genre: Musical; Drama
- Created by: Theresa Rebeck
- Based on: Smash by Garson Kanin
- Starring: Debra Messing; Jack Davenport; Katharine McPhee; Christian Borle; Megan Hilty; Anjelica Huston; Leslie Odom Jr.; Jeremy Jordan; Krysta Rodriguez; Andy Mientus; Raza Jaffrey; Brian d'Arcy James
- Theme music composer: Marc Shaiman
- Opening theme: "5, 6, 7, 8" (Season 2)
- Composers: Marc Shaiman; Scott Wittman; Chris Bacon (score, episodes 7–32)
- Country of origin: United States
- Original language: English
- No. of seasons: 2
- No. of episodes: 32

Production
- Executive producers: Craig Zadan; Neil Meron; Darryl Frank; Justin Falvey; Marc Shaiman; Scott Wittman; Steven Spielberg; Theresa Rebeck; David Marshall Grant; Joshua Safran
- Producers: Jordon Nardino; Jim Chory
- Production location: Brooklyn, New York
- Cinematography: Shelly Johnson (pilot only); M. David Mullen
- Editors: Andy Weisblum (pilot only); Bill Henry; Camilla Toniolo; Allyson Johnson
- Running time: 40–45 minutes
- Production companies: Madwoman in the Attic, Inc. (season 1); DreamWorks Television; Universal Television

Original release
- Network: NBC
- Release: February 6, 2012 – May 26, 2013

Smash (stylized as SMASH in all caps) is an American musical drama television series created by playwright Theresa Rebeck for NBC. Steven Spielberg served as one of the executive producers. The series was broadcast in the United States by NBC and produced by DreamWorks Television and Universal Television. The series revolves around a fictional New York City theater community and specifically the creation of a new Broadway musical. It features a large ensemble cast, led by Debra Messing, Jack Davenport, Katharine McPhee, Christian Borle, Megan Hilty, and Anjelica Huston.

The show debuted on February 6, 2012, and its first season ended on May 14, 2012. Its second season premiered on February 5, 2013, and ended on May 26, 2013. NBC announced a change in their lineup in March 2013 and moved the show to Saturdays starting April 6, 2013. The series was cancelled on May 10, 2013. Second season executive producer-showrunner Joshua Safran said the final episode of season 2 worked as a series finale.

The series, especially the pilot episode, enjoyed critical success. The first season received the Primetime Emmy Award for Outstanding Choreography among four nominations. The series was also nominated for a Golden Globe Award for Best Television Series – Musical or Comedy and a Grammy Award for Best Song Written for Visual Media ("Let Me Be Your Star").

== Premise ==
The show revolves around a group of characters creating new Broadway musicals, where everyone must balance their often chaotic personal life with the all-consuming demands of life in the theater. The series features original music by composers Marc Shaiman and Scott Wittman.

== Cast and characters ==
- Debra Messing as Julia Houston, a successful Broadway lyricist and the musical's co-writer. She is married with a son, but had an affair with Michael Swift, who played Joe DiMaggio in the initial Marilyn workshop. Houston is based on creator Theresa Rebeck.
- Jack Davenport as Derek Wills, the director of the musical, who will stop at nothing to make the show a success. He has an on-and-off relationship with Marilyn workshop star Ivy Lynn, though he has also shown interest in Karen Cartwright and had a physical relationship with Rebecca Duvall during the Boston preview before she left the show.
- Katharine McPhee as Karen Cartwright, an ingenue from Iowa, who lands a successful audition and becomes a serious contender for the role of Marilyn Monroe. Somewhat new to show business, her naiveté is generally scorned by her peers, though her talent is rarely called into question. She played Marilyn for the Boston preview, when Rebecca Duvall left. In Season 2, she helps Hit List get started and plays Amanda/Nina after she quits Bombshell.
- Christian Borle as Tom Levitt, a theatrical composer and Julia's longtime songwriting partner. He and Derek Wills have an acrimonious relationship stemming from a business fallout 11 years ago. Tom briefly dates a Republican lawyer but later becomes attracted to Sam Strickland, a dancer in the ensemble of Bombshell.
- Megan Hilty as Ivy Lynn, a seasoned performer who, at the beginning of the series, is working in the ensemble of Heaven On Earth, another Broadway musical that Tom and Julia wrote. Ivy is favored by nearly everyone on board with the production to play Marilyn Monroe, but after the workshop flops, she is replaced by Rebecca Duvall. Throughout the show, she is in an on-and-off relationship with the Bombshell director Derek Wills and finds herself constantly competing with Karen in many different situations, eventually losing the role of Marilyn to her for the Boston preview.
- Raza Jaffrey as Dev Sundaram (Season 1), Karen's live-in boyfriend, who works in the office of the New York City mayor's press secretary who ultimately forces her to choose between their relationship or her career. He proposes marriage but when Karen is unsure, a despondent and intoxicated Dev sleeps with Ivy. Upon realizing who Dev is, Ivy tells Karen of their encounter and an angry Karen breaks up with Dev.
- Jaime Cepero as Ellis Boyd (Season 1), Tom's and later Eileen's conniving personal assistant who is attempting to receive credit for Bombshell and make his way as a show producer. As the first season continues, Ellis, convinced his suggestion of Marilyn created the show, takes more steps to be recognized as a producer, including giving Rebecca a drink mixed with peanuts, which she is allergic to, in order to remove her as the star. He boasts of this to Eileen as proof of his skills but she responds by firing him.
- Anjelica Huston as Eileen Rand, the musical's tenacious producer, who is dealing with divorce proceedings from her husband, Jerry, which could threaten the musical and forces her to think outside the box in securing funds for the show. A running gag throughout the series is Eileen throwing drinks into Jerry's face.
- Brian d'Arcy James as Frank Houston (regular Season 1, guest Season 2), Julia's husband and a high-school chemistry teacher, who wishes that Julia would spend more time at home. He was upset when she confessed to her affair with Michael Swift and more so when he confronted Swift and learned Julia had cheated on him earlier in the marriage. They eventually separated in the Season 2 premiere. In the final episode of the program Julia makes good with Frank and both of them go easy on their divorce proceedings. James was credited as guest star in the pilot, but was promoted to regular from episode 2. He made guest appearances in the second-season premiere and the series finale.
- Jeremy Jordan as Jimmy Collins (Season 2), a working-class man from Brooklyn who is on the brink of self-destruction.
- Leslie Odom, Jr. as Sam Strickland (Season 2, recurring Season 1), an ensemble member, a good friend of Ivy who is gay and very much into sports. Due to their mutual friendship with Ivy, he forms a connection with Tom.
- Krysta Rodriguez as Ana Vargas (Season 2), Karen's new roommate who is looking for her big break.
- Andy Mientus as Kyle Bishop (Season 2), a poor kid from Brooklyn with dreams of writing for Broadway. He is the writer of the book of Hit List.
- Will Chase as Michael Swift (recurring Season 1), Broadway star, Julia's former boyfriend, who is brought in to play Joe DiMaggio.

== Episodes ==
Season	Episodes	Originally released	
Season	Episodes	First released	Last released
1	15	February 6, 2012	May 14, 2012
2	17	February 5, 2013	May 26, 2013

=== Season 1 (2012) ===
Julia Houston (Debra Messing) and Tom Levitt (Christian Borle), a Broadway writing team, came up with the idea of a new musical based on Marilyn Monroe's life titled Bombshell. Producer Eileen Rand (Anjelica Huston), in the midst of divorce proceedings from her philandering husband, jumps on board and brings with her Derek Wills (Jack Davenport), a difficult but brilliant director. Ivy Lynn (Megan Hilty) is initially cast as Marilyn, but is forced to deal with competition from the talented, yet naive ensemble member Karen Cartwright (Katharine McPhee). Julia's former lover Michael Swift (Will Chase) is initially cast in the role of Joe DiMaggio. However, when Julia and Michael's reunion causes serious trouble in her marriage to Frank (Brian d'Arcy James), the decision is made to fire Michael. The role of Marilyn is recast with film star Rebecca Duvall (Uma Thurman), leaving Ivy devastated. After a somewhat disastrous out-of-town opening in Boston, Rebecca has fallen sick due to a peanut allergy and the actor playing Joe departs the production for a better gig. Derek subsequently casts Karen in the role of Marilyn and Michael is reinstated as Joe. Karen discovers Ivy has slept with her fiancé Dev (Raza Jaffrey), while Eileen finds out that her assistant Ellis (Jaime Cepero) was the one who poisoned Rebecca and fires him. Karen gets through her debut and the season ends with the closing number being applauded by the audience.

No. overall	No. in season	Title	Directed by	Written by	Original release date	US viewers (millions)
1	1	"Pilot"	Michael Mayer	Teleplay by : Theresa Rebeck; Story by : Theresa Rebeck	February 6, 2012	11.44
2	2	"The Callback"	Michael Mayer	Theresa Rebeck	February 13, 2012	8.06
3	3	"Enter Mr. DiMaggio"	Michael Mayer	Theresa Rebeck	February 20, 2012	6.47
4	4	"The Cost of Art"	Michael Morris	David Marshall Grant	February 27, 2012	6.64
5	5	"Let's Be Bad"	Jamie Babbit	Julie Rottenberg & Elisa Zuritsky	March 5, 2012	7.76
6	6	"Chemistry"	Dan Attias	Jacquelyn Reingold	March 12, 2012	7.04
7	7	"The Workshop"	Mimi Leder	Jason Grote	March 19, 2012	6.56
8	8	"The Coup"	Paris Barclay	Theresa Rebeck	March 26, 2012	6.14
9	9	"Hell on Earth"	Paul McGuigan	Scott Burkhardt	April 2, 2012	6.03
10	10	"Understudy"	Adam Bernstein	Jerome Hairston	April 9, 2012	5.99
11	11	"The Movie Star"	Tricia Brock	Julie Rottenberg & Elisa Zuritsky	April 16, 2012	5.95
12	12	"Publicity"	Michael Mayer	Theresa Rebeck	April 23, 2012	6.01
13	13	"Tech"	Roxann Dawson	Jason Grote & Lakshmi Sundaram	April 30, 2012	5.34
14	14	"Previews"	Robert Duncan McNeill	David Marshall Grant	May 7, 2012	5.72
15	15	"Bombshell"	Michael Morris	Theresa Rebeck	May 14, 2012	5.96

=== Season 2 (2013) ===
As Bombshell works to open on Broadway in New York City, the show runs into legal and creative troubles which threaten its future. Meanwhile, the cast and crew (featured in Season 1) attempt to find work. Karen meets two aspiring friends and partners (Kyle, a stage writer played by Andy Mientus, and Jimmy, a composer played by Jeremy Jordan) and tries to get their work noticed, especially by Derek. Derek works with Broadway star Veronica Moore (Jennifer Hudson), who becomes friends with Karen. Ivy gets the lead in a revival of Liaisons, a musical adaptation of Les Liaisons Dangereuses. Bombshell needs work in order to open on Broadway. First, Peter Gillman (Daniel Sunjata), a dramaturg with whom Julia had a rocky relationship is hired in order to help re-write the show. Second, Jerry (Michael Cristofer) replaces Eileen as the show's producer after she had to step down when the federal authorities found out (through Jerry's orchestration) that she had financed Bombshell with illegal money. Jimmy and Kyle's show, called Hit List, eventually goes to the New York Fringe Festival and then they meet a producer for an off-broadway theater called Manhattan Theatre Workshop. Karen quits Bombshell to be in Hit List because she has to choose one of them. Ivy takes Karen's role as Marilyn Monroe in Bombshell. Hit List starts rehearsals. Karen and Jimmy's relationship starts to develop but may cause some disturbance in the work place with Derek's secret feelings for Karen. Hit List goes to Broadway produced by Jerry and Bombshell and Hit List go head-to-head at the Tony Awards. Hit List wins 7 Tonys, which is more than Bombshell, however Bombshell wins Best Musical and Best Actress (Ivy Lynn) in a Leading Role.

No. overall	No. in season	Title	Directed by	Written by	Original release date	US viewers (millions)
16	1	"On Broadway"	Michael Morris	Joshua Safran	February 5, 2013	4.48
17	2	"The Fallout"	Craig Zisk	Julie Rottenberg & Elisa Zuritsky	February 5, 2013	4.45
18	3	"The Dramaturg"	Larry Shaw	Bryan Goluboff	February 19, 2013	3.29
19	4	"The Song"	Michael Morris	Bathsheba Doran	February 26, 2013	3.04
20	5	"The Read-Through"	David Petrarca	Liz Tuccillo	March 5, 2013	2.68
21	6	"The Fringe"	Dan Lerner	Julia Brownell	March 12, 2013	2.90
22	7	"Musical Chairs"	Casey Nicholaw	Becky Mode	March 19, 2013	2.66
23	8	"The Bells and Whistles"	Craig Zisk	Noelle Valdivia	March 26, 2013	3.05
24	9	"The Parents"	Tricia Brock	Jordon Nardino	April 2, 2013	2.98
25	10	"The Surprise Party"	S. J. Clarkson	Julie Rottenberg & Elisa Zuritsky	April 6, 2013	1.88
26	11	"The Dress Rehearsal"	Mimi Leder	Julia Brownell	April 13, 2013	1.80
27	12	"Opening Night"	Michael Morris	Bathsheba Doran & Noelle Valdivia	April 20, 2013	1.91
28	13	"The Producers"	Tricia Brock	Becky Mode	April 27, 2013	1.89
29	14	"The Phenomenon"	Roxann Dawson	Jordon Nardino & Joshua Safran	May 4, 2013	2.28
30	15	"The Transfer"	Holly Dale	Justin Brenneman & Julia Brownell	May 11, 2013	2.01
31	16	"The Nominations (Part 1)"	Michael Morris	Bryan Goluboff	May 26, 2013	2.44
32	17	"The Tonys (Part 2)"	Michael Morris	Joshua Safran	May 26, 2013	2.44

== Development and production ==
=== Conception ===
Development began in 2009 at Showtime by then-Showtime entertainment president Robert Greenblatt and Steven Spielberg, from an idea by Spielberg, who had been working on the concept for years; Greenblatt, described as a "devoted theater geek", had also produced a musical adaptation of the film 9 to 5 in 2009. The original concept was that each season would follow the production of a new musical; if any of them were "stage-worthy", Spielberg would help produce them as stage productions. The series was inspired by successful TV Lab The West Wing and Upstairs, Downstairs and used them as role models. Garson Kanin's novel Smash (New York: Viking, 1980) provided the title and setting, although the plots have little in common. As a Showtime show, the script contained a lot of nudity. "It was definitely a cable show," Debra Messing said.

In January 2011, Greenblatt brought the project with him to NBC when he was made NBC Entertainment president. Theresa Rebeck was brought on as showrunner and wrote the pilot script after executive producers Craig Zadan and Neil Meron suggested her to Spielberg and Greenblatt. NBC ordered production of a pilot in January 2011 for the 2011–12 television season.

Michael Mayer directed the pilot episode, with Spielberg serving as an executive producer. It has been reported that the pilot cost $7.5 million to produce. On May 11, 2011, NBC picked the project up to series. When the network announced its 2011–12 schedule on May 15, 2011, the series was slated to premiere in mid-season. NBC opted to hold the show for mid-season in order to pair it up with the hit reality show The Voice on Monday nights. On August 1, 2011, it was announced by the press that the show's series premiere date would be February 6, 2012, the night after Super Bowl XLVI, with heavy promotion through early winter on many of the network's properties before the premiere. At the NBC Press Tour, Greenblatt announced that Smash would have 15 episodes produced for the first season to coincide with The Voice.

=== Crew ===
The series is a production of Universal Television in association with DreamWorks. Theresa Rebeck is the creator of the series, as well as the writer of the pilot episode and five of the first season's episodes, including the season finale. The series has a large number of executive producers, including Steven Spielberg, Craig Zadan, Neil Meron, David Marshall Grant, Rebeck, Darryl Frank and Justin Falvey. Marc Shaiman and Scott Wittman serve as the composers and executive producers. In March 2012, Rebeck stepped down as showrunner of the musical drama. On April 24, 2012, The Hollywood Reporter reported that Gossip Girl executive producer Joshua Safran would take the lead for the second season, while Rebeck would remain a writer and an executive producer. However, on May 2, 2012, Rebeck stated in an interview that she would not be returning to the show in any capacity.

=== Production ===
Many of those behind Smash began the series with high hopes. Rebeck was a large part of that. As one early hire later described her to BuzzFeed: "She was this kick-ass woman showrunner who wasn't taking shit from the network. Someone who had a very clear vision who was going to stand up to the network. They were all good things in the beginning."

Despite her experience writing and producing in television, Rebeck had never been a showrunner, responsible for the day-to-day operations of a series, before. David Marshall Grant, a playwright and actor who had served in that capacity during Brothers & Sisters' final seasons, was hired as executive producer to help her with it. Rebeck was reportedly resentful, and worried that she was being set up to fail and Grant positioned to replace her. Very quickly she began shutting him out of key decisions.

Rebeck also decided she would not run a "writers' room," i.e., a regular meeting with the entire writing staff to discuss and perfect episodes and plotlines. "[They] really are not my thing, because I can only stand being in a room with people so many hours a day," she told New York. "And I feel like early drafts should be speedy because everyone changes their mind, so why spend a lot of time up front parsing sentences?" Instead she would follow the example of showrunners like Matthew Weiner and Aaron Sorkin and have writers submit a first draft, which she then revised.

Very quickly, the writers recalled, the show became a "dictatorship". Rebeck's opinion was the only one that mattered. She insisted on writing the second and third episodes herself, and writers said that the drop in quality was evident during pre-air screenings. During this time Rebeck was often fighting with Spielberg, who wanted Hilty, Greenblatt, or Grant replaced. As a result of these distractions, plotlines like Julia's adoption dilemma (mirroring Rebeck's real life) began to assume unusual prominence, and along with them secondary characters like Leo and Ellis became almost main characters—the latter because Spielberg reportedly liked him.

Since the writers never met as a group, they found that finished episodes often repeated the same character moments instead of advancing those characters, and that strange out-of-context moments, usually musical numbers set away from the stage, had been inserted. They were particularly frustrated in trying to write for Julia, whom Rebeck had based on herself and consequently would not allow to have any difficulties. Later in the season, they were hoping that Greenblatt would win some of their fights. "You know it's bad when our last hope was the network," one told BuzzFeed. However, many of them said the show's own problems were not entirely Rebeck's fault, since Greenblatt also intervened in things like costume design and Spielberg was not informed of the conflicts until near the end.

After she left the show, Rebeck, who, citing confidentiality requirements, did not respond to the BuzzFeed story at first other than to say she "was treated quite badly", spoke at some length to The New York Observer about Smash:

One of the points of contention last year was that the network thinks they have the right to say to the writer of the show, "We don't want her to do this. We want her to do this ... And I would sometimes say back to them, "She would never do that." And they'd look at me like I was crazy, and I'd be like, "Nope, it's not crazy, it's just who the character is." You have to respect who the character is. It has its own internal truth and you can't betray that. And if you don't betray that, it will not betray you. There is this sort of sense that if you don't fuck with the muse—if you don't fuck with the muse, the muse will stand by you ... It turns into bigger questions about power and art, power and storytelling. Is power itself bigger than storytelling? And I would say no.

Following the show's cancellation, Kate Aurthur, the writer of the BuzzFeed story, reposted an email exchange she had with Rebeck. Pointing to the show's decline in ratings during its second season, Rebeck asked, "If in fact [I] was the problem with [the show], wouldn't things have gotten better—rather than dramatically worse—once [I] left?" She accused Aurthur of relying on a single unnamed source and asked that the story, which she called "wildly untrue", be taken down.

=== Music ===
NBC announced on June 9, 2011, that they had signed a deal with Columbia Records for a soundtrack of the series. The deal gives Columbia worldwide digital and physical rights to the first season, with options to subsequent seasons. The deal includes both original songs written for the series and any covers of songs featured on the show.

The series soundtrack for Season 1, The Music of Smash, was released on May 1, 2012. The album debuted on the Billboard 200 at #9, with 40,000 copies sold in its first week.

A Bombshell cast recording, featuring original songs from the first and second season of the show, was released on February 12, 2013, selling 16,000 copies in its first week. It contains all 22 songs written for the fictional Bombshell musical and features lead vocals by Katharine McPhee (Karen Cartwright) and Megan Hilty (Ivy Lynn) as Marilyn Monroe.

In addition to songs by Marc Shaiman and Scott Wittman, the show's second season featured songs by up-and-coming composers Drew Gasparini, Joe Iconis, and writing duo Benj Pasek and Justin Paul.

Several songs were written and performed for the series' Season 2 fictional musical, Hit List.

==== Bombshell musical numbers ====
Act I

- "Let Me Be Your Star" – Norma Jeane Mortenson
- "At Your Feet" – Gladys, young Norma Jeane, Tourists and Hollywood Citizens
- "Never Give All the Heart" – Norma Jeane
- "The 20th Century Fox Mambo" – Marilyn Monroe and Twentieth Century Fox Studio Staff
- "The National Pastime" – Marilyn and New York Yankees
- "History is Made at Night" – Marilyn, Joe DiMaggio and Lovers
- "I Never Met a Wolf Who Didn't Love to Howl" – Marilyn and Troops
- "Mr. & Mrs. Smith" – Marilyn and Joe DiMaggio
- "Don't Say Yes Until I Finish Talking" – Darryl F. Zanuck and Studio Executives
- "Smash!" – Aspiring Actresses
- "On Lexington & 52nd Street" – Joe DiMaggio, Marilyn, Reporter and New York Citizens
- "Cut, Print...Moving On" – Marilyn and Studio Staff

Act II

- "Dig Deep" – Marilyn, Lee Strasberg and Students
- "Public Relations" – Marilyn and Press
- "Second Hand White Baby Grand" – Marilyn
- "They Just Keep Moving the Line" – Marilyn
- "Let's Be Bad" – Marilyn and the cast of Some Like It Hot
- "The Right Regrets" – Arthur Miller
- "Our Little Secret" – John F. Kennedy and Marilyn
- "Hang the Moon" – Gladys and Marilyn
- "Don't Forget Me" – Marilyn

==== Hit List musical numbers ====
Act I

- "Broadway Here I Come (Pre-reprise)" — The Diva
- "Rewrite This Story" — Amanda and Jesse
- "Good for You" — Amanda
- "Broadway Here I Come!" — Amanda
- "The Love I Meant to Say" — Jesse
- "Reach for Me" — The Diva
- "Original" — Amanda
- "The Love I Meant to Say (Reprise)" — Amanda (as "Nina")
- "I Heard Your Voice in a Dream" — Jesse
- "Don't Let Me Know" — Amanda (as "Nina") and Jesse
- "Pretender" — Amanda (as "Nina")
- "I'm Not Sorry" — Amanda (as "Nina") and The Diva
- "I Heard Your Voice in a Dream (Reprise)" — Jesse
- "Caught In the Storm" — Jesse

Act II

- "[TBD Coming Home Song]" — The Diva (as "Sara Smith")
- "Good for You" — Amanda (as "Nina")
- "Heart Shaped Wreckage" — Amanda and Jesse
- "Broadway Here I Come (Reprise)" — Amanda
- "The Love I Meant to Say (Reprise)" — Jesse
- "The Goodbye Song" — Jesse, Amanda, The Diva and Ensemble

== Critical reception ==
The pilot of Smash received positive reviews from television critics, but the critical response was less positive as the season progressed.

Review aggregator Metacritic, which assigns a normalized rating out of 100 of reviews from mainstream critics, calculated a score of 79 based on 32 reviews. Maureen Ryan of The Huffington Post called it one of the strongest new shows of the season.

Huffington Post editor Karen Ocamb praised the writing and the creativity of the series. Mary McNamara of the Los Angeles Times called the show a "triumph" and said creator Theresa Rebeck as well as her team "have managed to capture the grand and sweeping gesture that is musical theater and inject it with the immediate intimacy of television."

David Wiegand of the San Francisco Chronicle gave the program a rave review: "[It's so] good you can't help wondering why no one thought of it before, a compelling mix of credible real-life melodrama with a fictionalized approximation of what it takes to get a Broadway show from the idea stage to opening night." Tim Goodman from The Hollywood Reporter called the pilot episode "Excellent, a bar-raiser for broadcast networks", and superior to Glee. He also praised writing and acting for the series, comparing it to the quality of a cable television series. Matt Mitovich of TVLine called the cast "pretty damn perfect" and complimented the musical numbers.

Robert Bianco of USA Today gave the show three and a half out of four stars and wrote, "Unless you're allergic to musicals in general and Broadway in particular, you should find that a compelling central story, a strong cast, an out-of-the-procedural-mold premise and some rousing, roof-raising numbers more than compensate for any lingering problems." Tanner Stransky of Entertainment Weekly ranked the pilot episode as the 8th best television episode of 2012, saying, "After we watched the subsequent 14 episodes of Smash with a mixture of fascination and dismay (seriously, did Debra Messing's Julia wear a men's pajama top to meet her lover?), it was difficult to recall that the pilot was positively magical. But it was. In fact, that episode-ending performance of 'Let Me Be Your Star' (featuring dueling divas Megan Hilty and Katharine McPhee) was among TV's most watchable and gleeful three minutes of the year. Rare is the series whose high-water mark is its pilot, and Smash is a shining example."

Chris Harnick of The Huffington Post wrote, "How has the rest of Season 1 been so far? Not so phenomenal. That's not to say it has been downright terrible—there have been some highly entertaining moments—but it certainly hasn't been goosebumps-inducing, like the final moments of Episode 1, set to 'Let Me Be Your Star.'" Kevin Fallon summed up the response in The Atlantic, writing that "there's been an almost visceral reaction to how rapidly and sharply the show's quality has dipped, and just how much promise Smash has thwarted...In other words: It's bad." Fallon cites other critics in demonstrating the general acceptance of this opinion.

=== Awards and nominations ===
Smash received a number of awards and nominations. In 2012, it was nominated for four Primetime Emmy Awards, winning one for Choreography.

Year	Award	Category	Recipient	Result
2011	Critics' Choice Television Award	Most Exciting New Series		Won
2012	Primetime Emmy Award	Outstanding Guest Actress in a Drama Series	Uma Thurman	Nominated
2012	Primetime Emmy Award	Outstanding Choreography	Josh Bergasse	Won
2012	Primetime Emmy Award	Outstanding Music Composition for a Series	Marc Shaiman (Original Music) & Christian Bacon (Score)	Nominated
2012	Primetime Emmy Award	Outstanding Original Music and Lyrics	Marc Shaiman & Scott Wittman ("Let Me Be Your Star")	Nominated
2012	Teen Choice Award	Choice TV Breakout Show		Nominated
2012	Teen Choice Award	Choice TV Breakout Female Star	Katharine McPhee	Nominated
2012	Television Critics Association Award	Outstanding New Program		Nominated
2012	Women's Image Network Awards	Best Drama Series		Won
2012	Women's Image Network Awards	Best Actress in a Drama Series	Katharine McPhee	Won
2012	Women's Image Network Awards	Best Actress in a Drama Series	Debra Messing	Nominated
2013	American Cinema Editors Award	Best Edited One-Hour Series for Commercial Television	Andrew Weisblum ("Pilot")	Nominated
2013	Dorian Award	LGBT TV Show of the Year		Nominated
2013	Dorian Award	Campy TV Show of the Year		Nominated
2013	Dorian Award	TV Musical Performance of the Year	Katharine McPhee & Megan Hilty ("Let Me Be Your Star")	Nominated
2013	Dorian Award	TV Musical Performance of the Year	Katharine McPhee, Raza Jaffrey & cast ("A Thousand and One Nights")	Nominated
2013	Golden Globe Award	Best Television Series – Musical or Comedy		Nominated
2013	Grammy Award	Best Song Written for Visual Media	"Let Me Be Your Star" (Marc Shaiman & Scott Wittman)	Nominated
2013	GLAAD Media Awards	Outstanding Drama Series		Won
2013	CDG Awards	Outstanding Contemporary Television Series	Molly Maginnis	Won
2013	MPSE Golden Reel Award	Best Sound Editing: Short Form Musical in Television	Dan Evan Farkas, Annette Kudrak and Robert Cotnoir MPSE ("Hell on Earth")	Won
2013	Society of Operating Cameramen	Camera Operator of the Year in Television	Jeff Muhlstock	Nominated
2013	Primetime Emmy Award	Outstanding Original Music and Lyrics	Marc Shaiman & Scott Wittman ("Hang the Moon")	Nominated
2013	Primetime Emmy Award	Outstanding Original Music and Lyrics	Andrew McMahon ("I Heard Your Voice In a Dream")	Nominated

=== Pre-release ===
In June 2011, Smash was one of eight honorees in the "Most Exciting New Series" category at the 1st Critics' Choice Television Awards, voted by journalists who had seen the pilots. Due to the already positive buzz surrounding the show, NBC offered early viewings of the pilot on different platforms. From January 15 through January 30, 2012, it was screened on selected flights of American Airlines. From January 16 through February 6, 2012, the full pilot was offered for free on iTunes, Amazon Video, Xbox, and Zune.

=== Ratings ===
The ratings for the Season 1 premiere were strong but ratings steadily dropped as the series progressed. The pilot episode was watched by 11.44 million viewers and had an 18–49 rating of 3.8/10. It was also the third-highest-rated new drama debut of the 2011–2012 television season (behind Once Upon a Time and Touch) and "delivered the biggest 10 p.m. rating of any drama in this television season", according to Entertainment Weekly. The program also had the highest 18–49 rating and viewership for an NBC series in the time slot since November 2008, but ratings declined in subsequent episodes. The fourth episode, aired on February 27, was seen by 6.6 million viewers and received a 2.3/6 rating in the 18–49 age group. However, the show's fifth episode, aired on March 5, saw a 17% increase in ratings. It had an 18–49 rating of 2.7/7 and was seen by 7.76 million viewers. But ratings for the show decreased in later episodes, with the eighth episode dropping to an 18–49 rating of 2.1/5 and viewership going down to 6.4 million viewers. Nonetheless, it became NBC's #1 drama in adults 18–49 and total viewers. The series was also up 160 percent in adults 18–49 versus NBC's season average in the time period prior to Smash (with a 2.6 rating vs. a 1.0, "live plus same day") and in total viewers, Smash has improved the time period by 100 percent (7.7 million vs. 3.9 million).

For Season 2, Smash was scheduled for Tuesdays at 10 at mid-season starting February 5, behind the low-rated The New Normal and several weeks before the new season of The Voice premiered, and the ratings cratered, with the February 5, 2013 2-hour 2-episode season premiere getting a 1.2 rating in the 18–49 demo. The ratings slid further to 0.9 for the 3rd episode and stayed around that number through the sixth episode, when NBC announced it was moving Smash to Saturdays as of April 6, 2013 and changing up its Tuesday lineup to put its dating reality show Ready for Love behind The Voice.

Season	Timeslot (ET)	Season premiere	Season finale	Rank	Viewers (in millions)	Viewers High (in millions)	Viewers Low (in millions)	18–49 Average	18–49 High	18–49 Low	Ref
1	Monday 10:00 p.m.	February 6, 2012	May 14, 2012	#51	8.94	11.44	5.34	3.2	3.8	1.8	
2	Tuesday 10:00 p.m. (February 5 – April 2, 2013) Saturday 9:00 p.m. (April 6, 2013) Saturday 8:00 p.m. (April 13 – May 11, 2013) Sunday 9:00 p.m. (May 26, 2013)	February 5, 2013	May 26, 2013	#113	2.72	4.48	1.80	1.4	1.2	0.4	

== Syndication ==
Ovation has picked up off-network rights to Smash. The first season debuted on July 19, 2013. Season 2 episodes, scheduled to begin airing in November 2013, were pushed back to January 2014.

== DVD releases ==
The first season of Smash was released under the title Smash: Season One as a widescreen four-disc DVD box set on October 29, 2012, formatted for Region 2. The DVD formatted for Region 1 was released on January 8, 2013. Distributed by Universal Studios Home Entertainment, the set features every episode and includes several DVD extras including behind-the-scenes footage and making-of features as well as extended and deleted scenes and a blooper reel. Also included is an UltraViolet copy of each episode.

The Target exclusive edition of the Season 1 set includes a fifth disc that includes the full-length music video for "Touch Me" performed by Katharine McPhee, as well as twenty minutes of additional interviews with Jack Davenport (Derek Wills) and Megan Hilty (Ivy Lynn).

Season 2 was released on DVD on August 6, 2013.

== Legacy ==
=== Live performances ===
==== Bombshell: The Musical ====
During production of the show, executive producer Craig Zadan said: "We stand on the set, watch the Bombshell numbers and say, "Wouldn't this be great on Broadway? And so far that's where we've left it. Our priority now is producing a great TV show".

In June 2015, following a sold-out reunion performance at the Minskoff Theatre, it was announced that Bombshell would head to the Broadway stage. The executive producers of Smash and the Bombshell concert, Neil Meron and Craig Zadan, were set to executive produce the Broadway production. No timeline for the show has been announced.

==== Hit List ====
On October 15, 2013, it was announced that Hit List would be staged in concert format at 54 Below on December 9. Smash stars Jeremy Jordan, Andy Mientus, and Krysta Rodriguez were scheduled to perform. Because of demand for tickets, an additional performance was scheduled for December 8.

=== Original Broadway production ===
In May 2020, shortly after a virtual cast reunion during a live-streamed concert, it was announced that a musical based solely on the plot of the series was in the works for a Broadway production. Spielberg, Greenblatt, and Meron are all attached as producers, with Bob Martin and Rick Elice penning the book to Wittman and Shaiman's score, and Bergasse returning to choreograph. Of the announcement, Spielberg stated, "Smash is near and dear to my heart, and it seems fitting that a new musical inspired by what we did on the show would eventually come to the stage. I'm beyond thrilled to be working with this incredible creative team and my producing partners, who began the Smash journey with me over 10 years ago."

On May 20, 2022, a first reading followed by a week-long workshop occurred of "SMASH: The Musical," with a script by Martin and Elice, music and lyrics by Wittman and Shaiman, and produced by Spielberg, Greenblatt, and Meron. According to Shaiman, while there are no "concrete plans" to bring the musical to Broadway, he was hopeful it would premiere on Broadway "sooner than later." Among the performers were Hilty, Rodriguez, Brooks Ashmanskas, Beth Leavel, Bonnie Milligan, Daniel Breaker, Kristine Nielsen, Maddie Baillio, and Christian Thompson, with Stephen Oremus as musical director.

On March 22, 2023, it was announced that Smash would officially open during the 2024–25 Broadway season with five time Tony Award winner Susan Stroman directing and Bergasse choreographing, music and lyrics by Shaiman and Wittman, and a book by Elice and Martin. On January 4, 2024, it was announced that Smash would have a six-week workshop starting that month, with cast members Ashmanskas, Alex Brightman, Yvette Nicole Brown, Bella Coppola, Nihar Duvvuri, Casey Garvin, Robyn Hurder, Nielsen, Rodriguez, and Jonalyn Saxer. Smash began performances at the Imperial Theatre on March 11, 2025 with an official opening scheduled for April 10. Announced cast members include Hurder as Ivy, Caroline Bowman as Karen, Ashmanskas as Nigel, Rodriguez as Tracy, John Behlmann as Jerry, Nielsen as Susan, Jacqueline B. Arnold as Anita, Bella Coppola as Chloe, and Casey Garvin as Charlie.
