= Steven Hurder =

American mathematician

- Education: University of Illinois Urbana-Champaign
- Scientific career
- Fields: Mathematics
- Workplaces: University of Illinois Chicago
- Thesis: Dual Homotopy Invariants of G-Foliations (1980)
- Doctoral advisor: Franz W. Kamber
- Website: homepages.math.uic.edu/~hurder/

Steven Edmond Hurder is an American mathematician specializing in foliation theory, differential topology, smooth ergodic theory, rigidity of group actions and spectral and index theory of operators. Hurder is a professor emeritus at University of Illinois Chicago. Hurder was named as an inaugural fellow of the American Mathematical Society in 2013.

== Education ==
Hurder received his PhD in 1980 at University of Illinois Urbana-Champaign. His advisor was Franz W. Kamber, and the title of his dissertation was Dual Homotopy Invariants of G-Foliations.

== Selected publications ==
- Hurder, Steven (1981). Dual homotopy invariants of G-foliations, Topology, 20(4):365–387.
- Hurder, Steven; Katok, Anatoly (1990). Differentiability, rigidity and Godbillon-Vey classes for Anosov flows, Inst. Hautes Études Sci. Publ. Math. no. 72, 5–61.
- Clark, Alex; Hurder, Steven (2013). Homogeneous matchbox manifolds, Trans. Amer. Math. Soc. 365, no. 6, 3151–3191.
- Hurder, Steven (1992). Rigidity for Anosov actions of higher rank lattices, Ann. of Math. (2) 135, no. 2, 361–410.
- Hurder, S.; Katok, A (1987). Ergodic theory and Weil measures for foliations, Ann. of Math. (2) 126, no. 2, 221–275.
- Douglas, Ronald G.; Kaminker, Jerome (1991). Cyclic cocycles, renormalization and eta-invariants, Invent. Math. 103 (1991), no. 1, 101—179.
