= Bullets Over Broadway (musical) =

Bullets Over Broadway the Musical
- 2014 Broadway Playbill
- Music: Various artists
- Lyrics: Various artists
- Book: Woody Allen
- Basis: Bullets Over Broadway by Woody Allen; Douglas McGrath
- Premiere: 2014: St. James Theatre Cleveland
- Productions: 2014 Broadway; 2015 US Tour

Bullets Over Broadway the Musical is a jukebox musical written by Woody Allen, based on his and Douglas McGrath's 1994 film Bullets Over Broadway about a young playwright whose first Broadway play is financed by a gangster. The score consists of jazz and popular standards of the years between World War I and about 1930 by various songwriters. It received its premiere on Broadway, in 2014, at the St. James Theatre, and closed on August 24, 2014, after over a hundred performances.

== Production ==
Bullets Over Broadway the Musical premiered on Broadway at the St. James Theatre on March 11, 2014, in previews, officially opening on April 10, 2014. Directed and choreographed by Susan Stroman, the cast features Marin Mazzie (as Helen Sinclair), Zach Braff (as David Shayne), Nick Cordero (as Cheech), Karen Ziemba (as Eden Brent), Vincent Pastore (as Nick Valenti), and Brooks Ashmanskas (as Warner Purcell). Scenic design was by Santo Loquasto, costumes by William Ivey Long, lighting by Donald Holder, sound by Peter Hylenski, musical arrangements and supervision by Glen Kelly and orchestrations by Doug Besterman.

The musical contains jazz and popular standards from the years between World War I and about 1930, with additional lyrics written by Glen Kelly.

The musical closed on August 24, 2014, after 156 performances and 33 previews. A non-equity touring production followed in October 2015.

== Background ==
The musical is based on the 1994 film Bullets Over Broadway, which had a screenplay by Woody Allen and Douglas McGrath. Work on a musical version of Bullets started in 2000, with Marvin Hamlisch and Craig Carnelia writing the music and Allen writing the book. In 2003, Hamlisch confirmed that work on the musical was proceeding.

In an interview on the opening night of the musical in April 2014, Allen said that he had resisted turning the film into a musical for years, having no interest in it as a musical. However, his sister Letty Aronson thought that it could be done as a period musical, and Allen then became interested. Marvin Hamlisch had played a few of the new songs for Allen, but Allen did not think they were right for the musical. His sister then proposed the idea of using songs of the 1920s, "and it suddenly came to life." Susan Stroman was brought into the creative team two years before the opening.

Celebrities such as Barbara Walters, Regis Philbin, and Dianne Wiest showed up on opening night.

== Plot ==
In 1929, playwright David Shayne is finally getting his first play God of Our Fathers produced on Broadway. The producer, Julian Marx, has enlisted the wealthy gangster Nick Valenti to pay for the show. Valenti wants to have his dim-witted and untalented girlfriend, Olive Neal, star as one of the leads. Valenti has assigned his strong-arm gangster Cheech to watch over Olive. Surprisingly, Cheech comes up with great ideas for improving the play. However, aging diva Helen Sinclair, the real star of the show, romances the younger David, who already has a girlfriend, Ellen. Meanwhile, the leading man, Warner Purcell, has his eye on Olive.

== Songs ==
Act 1

- "Tiger Rag" – The Atta-Girls, Olive, Nick, Cheech, Aldo and Gangsters
- "Gee, Baby, Ain't I Good to You" – Nick, Olive, The Atta-Girls, David, and Ellen
- "Blues My Naughty Sweetie Gives to Me" – Ellen and David
- "Tain't a Fit Night Out for Man or Beast" – Valenti Gang, Kustabeck Gang and Flappers
- "The Hot Dog Song" – Olive, Hot Dog Man, Men
- "Gee Baby, Ain't I Good to You (Reprise)" – Nick
- "They Go Wild, Simply Wild, Over Me" – Helen and Julian
- "Up a Lazy River" – Cheech
- "I'm Sitting on Top of the World" – David, Warner, Eden, Ensemble
- "Let's Misbehave" – Warner and Olive
- "There's a Broken Heart for Every Light on Broadway" – Helen and David
- "(I'll Be Glad When You're Dead) You Rascal You" – The Atta-Girls
- "Tain't Nobody's Biz-ness If I Do" – Cheech and Gangsters
- "Runnin' Wild" – Full Company

Act 2

- "There's a New Day Comin'!" – Eden and Company
- "There'll Be Some Changes Made" – Cheech, Warner and Gangsters
- "I Ain't Gonna Play No Second Fiddle" – Helen and David
- "Good Old New York" – The Red Caps
- "Up a Lazy River (Reprise)" – Cheech
- "I've Found a New Baby" – Ellen and David
- "The Panic Is On" – David
- "Tain't Nobody's Biz-ness If I do (Reprise)" – Cheech
- "Runnin' Wild (Reprise)" – Company
- "Up a Lazy River (Reprise)" – Cheech
- "She's Funny That Way" – David and Ellen
- "Yes! We Have No Bananas (Finale)" – Company

== Principal roles and original cast ==
Character	Broadway	Non-Equity US Tour
Character	2014	2015
David Shayne	Zach Braff	Michael Williams
Helen Sinclair	Marin Mazzie	Emma Stratton
Warner Purcell	Brooks Ashmanskas	Bradley Allan Zarr
Nick Valenti	Vincent Pastore	Michael Corvino
Julian Marx	Lenny Wolpe	Rick Grossman
Cheech	Nick Cordero	Jeffrey Brooks
Ellen	Betsy Wolfe	Hannah Cruz
Olive Neal	Heléne Yorke	Jemma Jane
Eden Brent	Karen Ziemba	Rachel Bahler

== Critical reception ==
According to Stagegrade, the reviews were mixed, with some praising ("fun, beautiful musical") and some panning ("charm-free") the musical. The latter especially criticized the use of existing songs rather than having an original score. They conclude that this "may be among the most polarizing shows of the current season."

Ben Brantley in his review for The New York Times, called the musical "occasionally funny but mostly just loud." Elysa Gardner, in her review for USA Today, commented that the musical has "playful wit and exuberance" and wrote that "Bullets offers as much sheer, shameless fun as any show you'll see this season."

Alexis Soloski, reviewing for The Guardian, praised the way Stroman tells the plot through her choreography and especially noted the staging for Ashmanskas ("lumbering jetés"), Yorke ("brassy thrusts') and the tap numbers for the male ensemble. However, she found that the songs were not well integrated into the story.

== Awards and nominations ==
=== Original Broadway production ===
Year	Award ceremony	Category	Nominee	Result
2014	Tony Award	Best Book of a Musical	Woody Allen	Nominated
2014	Tony Award	Best Featured Actor in a Musical	Nick Cordero	Nominated
2014	Tony Award	Best Choreography	Susan Stroman	Nominated
2014	Tony Award	Best Orchestrations	Doug Besterman	Nominated
2014	Tony Award	Best Scenic Design	Santo Loquasto	Nominated
2014	Tony Award	Best Costume Design	William Ivey Long	Nominated
2014	Drama Desk Award	Outstanding Featured Actor in a Musical	Nick Cordero	Nominated
2014	Drama Desk Award	Outstanding Director of a Musical	Susan Stroman	Nominated
2014	Drama Desk Award	Outstanding Choreography	Susan Stroman	Nominated
2014	Drama Desk Award	Outstanding Set Design	Santo Loquasto	Nominated
2014	Drama Desk Award	Outstanding Costume Design	William Ivey Long	Won
2014	Drama Desk Award	Outstanding Sound Design in a Musical	Peter Hylenski	Nominated
2014	Outer Critics Circle Award	Outstanding Featured Actor in a Musical	Nick Cordero	Won
2014	Outer Critics Circle Award	Outstanding Featured Actress in a Musical	Marin Mazzie	Won
2014	Outer Critics Circle Award	Outstanding Choreographer	Susan Stroman	Nominated
2014	Outer Critics Circle Award	Outstanding Costume Design	William Ivey Long	Won
2014	Drama League Award	Distinguished Production of a Musical		Nominated
2014	Fred and Adele Astaire Awards	Outstanding Male Dancer in a Broadway Show	Nick Cordero	Nominated
2014	Fred and Adele Astaire Awards	Outstanding Female Dancer in a Broadway Show	Heléne Yorke	Nominated
2014	Fred and Adele Astaire Awards	Outstanding Female Dancer in a Broadway Show	Karen Ziemba	Nominated
2014	Fred and Adele Astaire Awards	Outstanding Choreographer in a Broadway Show	Susan Stroman	Nominated
2014	Theatre World Award	—N/a	Nick Cordero	Won
