= Cagney =

- Language: Gaelic

Origin
- Meaning: descendant of advocate
- Region of origin: Ireland

Cagney is an Irish patronymic surname of Gaelic origin. In Gaelic, the name is Ó Caingne, and means "grandson of advocate", from caingean "legal dispute."

In modern times, it can be a male or female given name.

== People ==
- James Cagney (1899–1986), Academy Award-winning actor
- Jeanne Cagney (1919–1984), his sister and actress
- William Cagney (1905–1988), his brother and an American film producer and actor
- Mark Cagney (born 1956), Irish breakfast television broadcaster

== Other uses ==
- 6377 Cagney, a main-belt asteroid
- Cagney & Lacey, 1980s American police detective drama series
  - Christine Cagney, one of the two titular characters in said series
- Cagney Carnation, a flower boss from Cuphead
- Cagney Jeffords, a minor character in American police comedy series Brooklyn Nine-Nine

== See also ==
- Cagny (disambiguation)
