= Smash (novel) =

1980 novel by Garson Kanin

- First edition cover
- Author: Garson Kanin
- Language: English
- Genre: Novel
- Publisher: Viking Press
- Publication date: 1980
- Publication place: United States
- Media type: Print (hardback & paperback)
- Pages: 522
- ISBN: 0670148032

Smash is an American novel by Garson Kanin. Published in 1980 by Viking Press, the book follows the creation of a Broadway musical about vaudeville performer Nora Bayes, from casting to opening night.

Smash was the partial basis for the 2012 NBC television series Smash.

== Plot ==
The novel is in the form of a production diary for Shine On, Harvest Moon, the fictional musical being created about the life of vaudevillian Nora Bayes. The diary is kept by Production Secretary Midge Maghakian, a young woman who leaves her secure publishing job to join the staff. She finds herself caught up in the various power struggles to control the musical.

With the production in trouble, producer Art Clune turns to Gene Bowman, the Chicago-based author of the Bayes biography upon which the musical is based. His rewrites lead to continued improvement of the show but the struggle for control continues, culminating in director Larry Gabel's being forced out, replaced by Production Supervisor Clay Botsford. As this is happening, Midge and Gene enter into a physical relationship and Midge finds herself falling in love with the older Gene.

The show founders through out-of-town tryouts in Boston and Philadelphia along with a surprise run in Washington, D.C. as the major players continue to jockey for position and power. In a last-ditch effort to save the show, Midge, Gene and others in the production staff conspire with Larry to bring his vision back to it. After attending previews in outlandish disguises and donning drag as Clay's secretary, Larry rejoins the show openly as director just before opening night.

On the day of the Broadway opening, Midge quits the production and flies to Chicago. The show gets rave reviews and Midge calls Gene to tell him she has moved to be with him.

== Funny Girl ==
Smash is loosely based on Kanin's experiences directing the 1964 Broadway musical Funny Girl. Writing for Playbill magazine, Peter Filichia noted possible parallels between characters from Smash and real-life counterparts, including:

- Art Clune and Funny Girl producer Ray Stark. Filichia notes that their first and last names have the same number of letters, and where Stark was married to the daughter of Funny Girl subject Fannie Brice, Clune is married to the grand-niece of Nora Bayes.
- Hy Balaban and composer Jule Styne. He says that Kanin's physical description of Balaban matches Styne's and that their musical talents are similar.
- Jenny Flagg and choreographer Carol Haney. He again cites similar physical descriptions.
- Roger Corman and actor Sydney Chaplin. Corman is little-discussed in the book and Chaplin was overlooked during his year in Funny Girl.

The novel's analogs to Funny Girl star Barbra Streisand and her husband at the time, Elliott Gould, Filichia finds a much less direct comparison and he finds amusement in Kanin's description of director Larry Gabel as "ruggedly attractive, intense, lean, and the opposite of flaky ... fastidious, always beautifully groomed and dressed".

Filichia also cites events in the novel that match events that happened during Kanin's work on the musical. These include an argument over whether to include Bayes' song "Shine On, Harvest Moon" (similar to an argument over including "My Man" in Funny Girl) and a show-stopping number by supporting players (mirroring the audience response to "Who Taught Her Everything?").

== Television series ==
In 2012, NBC debuted a television series also entitled Smash. The series follows the basic premise of the novel, although the central musical is based not on Nora Bayes but on Marilyn Monroe. Sources report that the novel was optioned solely for the title; however, "based on the novel by Garson Kanin" appears in each episode's closing credits.

== Critical response ==
Writing for the Associated Press, Gregory Ryan cited Kanin's "crisp style" and his ability to "catch[] the flavor of the various cities that [the musical] plays in" before opening in New York to conclude that although Smash is flawed it "should give many people hours of fun reading".

The authors of A Novel Approach to Theatre: From Adams to Zola, a compendium of capsule reviews of novels about the theatre, called Smash "brazen, racing, hard-talking and funny".

Trey Graham for NPR described Smash as "a steamy, smart story" with Kanin's "passion for showbiz...cooked...thoroughly into it".

With the novel's connection to the television series, the book garnered some renewed critical attention. Writing for The A.V. Club, Noel Murray incorporated passages from and opinions on the novel into his weekly episode recap/reviews. Initially he found that the novel was "one of those scandalous, soapy bestsellers that was [sic] all the rage in the Jackie Collins era--the ones with a gratuitous sex scene every few pages--and Kanin seemed to be filling in the blanks in some kind of a trash-fiction version of MadLibs". Just a week later he had revised his opinion upward, saying it had improved by focusing on the mechanics of mounting a show but questioning Kanin's decision to present long conversations in the form of script pages.

Filichia summed up his response to the novel by writing, "So, okay, Smash isn't great literature. But, like every other book written about a fictitious Broadway musical, it's awfully hard to put down -- in both senses of that expression."
