= Bombshell (musical) =

2015 American musical

- Music: Marc Shaiman
- Lyrics: Marc Shaiman; Scott Wittman
- Basis: Smash by Theresa Rebeck
- Productions: 2015 Concert

Bombshell is an American musical with music by Marc Shaiman and lyrics by Marc Shaiman and Scott Wittman based on the original fictitious musical from the first season of the NBC television series Smash. The songs include soulful jazz anthems and upbeat pop songs. Bombshell is the life story of Marilyn Monroe. It tells the story of the aspiring starlet who transforms herself into a worldwide sex symbol, including her early life and her alleged affair with American President John F. Kennedy. Despite the same name, and subject matter, this musical from SMASH is unrelated to the Off-Broadway musical from 2001 which ran at the Grove Street Playhouse.

In the television series, Bombshell is an attempt by Smash characters Julia Houston (Debra Messing) and Tom Levitt (Christian Borle) to write their next Broadway sensation, with book and lyrics by Julia and music by Tom. Bombshell centers around Marilyn Monroe, Joe DiMaggio, and Kennedy.

A soundtrack featuring the music from the musical was released in 2013. The songs were featured in a one-night charity concert, and the show was being adapted for an actual stage musical.

== Plot ==
=== Act 1 ===
At the opening of the show, is Norma Jeane Mortenson, before she changed her name to Marilyn Monroe. Her first marriage has just ended due to her all consuming drive to be a movie star ("Let Me Be Your Star").

We flash back to the 10-year-old Norma Jeane, who is being dropped off at Grauman's Chinese Theatre by her single mom, Gladys, a mentally unstable film cutter who uses the courtyard filled with movie stars' foot and hand prints to babysit for her daughter ("At Your Feet"). Flash forward to the adult Norma Jeane, who is now an actress often confronted with the casting couch, and pays her bills by modeling. At one photo shoot, she spies a book of Yeats' poetry on the shelf and surprises the photographer with her knowledge of the poet's work as she sings of her history with men. But even as she quotes Yeats, the song ends with her naked in the iconic calendar pose ("Never Give All the Heart").

Norma Jeane finds herself in the middle of a contract with 20th Century Fox, around 1946. This is when, with the help of 20th Century Fox executive Ben Lyon, she lands a screen test, during which she selects the name Marilyn Monroe for herself, and this number sees the transformation from Norma Jeane into Marilyn ("20th Century Fox Mambo").

On Marilyn's first date with baseball player Joe DiMaggio, the two go to a drive-in movie, and other lovers back them up as they sing this romantic duet ("History Is Made At Night"). After Joe and Marilyn's date, Marilyn goes straight to the ball field for some due diligence, and sings with the New York Yankees ("The National Pastime"). Joe & Marilyn arrive back in America from their honeymoon in Japan. Joe does his best to domesticate her with the promise of a simpler life ("Mr. & Mrs. Smith"). Marilyn is asked to perform for the troops in Korea. Joe sees firsthand how men react to her and how she loves it ("I Never Met a Wolf Who Didn't Love to Howl").

Film producer Darryl F. Zanuck begins complaining to his studio executives about Marilyn Monroe's lack of professionalism while holding a meeting in a sauna, where the other male executives are all wearing nothing but towels, true to Zanuck's actual studio executive meetings ("Don't Say Yes Until I Finish Talking"). We see a large number of aspiring actresses sneak into film producer Darryl F. Zanuck's office and bribe him with sexual favors to be cast in his films. These young women are led by Norma Jeane, and Zanuck seems to enjoy their advances ("Smash!"). Marilyn shoots a scene from the 1954 film The Seven Year Itch in which the air from a subway grating must blow her skirt up. As the director orders for the scene to be reshot time and time again, a large crowd gathers to watch Marilyn. Joe DiMaggio is infuriated by the spectacle, which leads to his eventual divorce from Marilyn ("On Lexington & 52nd Street").

Marilyn is now in Hollywood on her next film, as the divorce from Joe becomes official, and the film wraps. Marilyn resolves to keep going with the only family she knows, the film crew. They smile at her attempt at camaraderie, but long fed up with her on-set behavior, they throw all her wrap presents away, which she discovers as the curtain falls on Act One ("Cut, Print... Moving On").

=== Act 2 ===
Making one picture after another, Marilyn becomes dissatisfied with the roles she is being offered, "retires" from pictures and flies off to New York City, where she is met by a phalanx of reporters and fans at Idelwild Airport ("Public Relations"). In 1955, Marilyn studies with Lee Strasberg at the Actors Studio in New York City. Being limited by typecasting, she meets with Cheryl Crawford before interviewing with Lee and being accepted into the Actors Studio ("Dig Deep"). While huddled around a piano at a party in New York, Marilyn meets esteemed playwright Arthur Miller. She tells him of how her often-institutionalized mother bought a piano once on an infrequent visit home, which is Norma Jeane's only memory of a happy moment between her and her mother, and that after searching for years, she found the actual piano, bought it, and now takes it with her wherever she lives. ("Second Hand White Baby Grand"). Arthur is deeply touched, they fall in love and marry.

Marilyn, with newfound confidence in her acting skills, goes to England to film The Prince and the Showgirl opposite Laurence Olivier. Unfortunately, Olivier treats her like a "no talent" and she admits to the apprentice hired to look after her that she wonders if the auditioning and always having to prove herself will ever stop ("They Just Keep Moving the Line"). Marilyn begrudgingly heading back to Hollywood to film Some Like It Hot, but is so unhappy about still having to play the dumb blonde that she begins spiraling down, keeping the crew waiting more than ever, as she drinks and takes pills ("Let's Be Bad"). Arthur Miller realizes he can't help with her behavior, or even stay with Marilyn anymore ("The Right Regrets").

Marilyn is on her own back in Hollywood. She attends a fundraiser for JFK in Palm Springs, where Nat King Cole entertains, rallying the super glamorous guests ("(Let's Start) Tomorrow Tonight"). Sparks fly between Marilyn and JFK, and they begin to sneak off together whenever he can manage to get away. But it is a degrading and doomed relationship ("Our Little Secret"). Marilyn fantasizes about visiting her retired mother at the sanitarium, where - in the dream - Gladys says all the things to Marilyn that she always wanted to hear ("Hang the Moon"). Marilyn is in bed. She calls up a man to keep her company, but he denies her. At the end of the number, it is implied that she dies ("Second Hand White Baby Grand (Reprise)").

Years after their divorce, Marilyn's ex-husband Joe DiMaggio mourns at her funeral. He brings a rose to set on her grave and sadly reminisces about how the two fell apart ("Mr. & Mrs. Smith (Reprise)"). Marilyn posthumously reflects on her life and begs the audience not to let her trials and tribulations be forgotten. More than anything, she wants her legacy to live on, even in the little things of everyday life ("Don't Forget Me").

== Productions ==
=== Benefit concert ===
Shaiman and Wittman said a charitable organization may put on a concert featuring songs from Bombshell: "A concert could feature the cast and additional performers from Broadway. That would be a wonderful way for the show to live on".

In December 2014, it was announced that Bombshell would see life on Broadway as a special, one-night-only benefit event in 2015. Smash executive producers Neil Meron and Craig Zadan produced the show and some of the original Smash cast, including Megan Hilty as Monroe, also reprised their roles. The single Monday June 8 performance in the Minskoff Theatre on Broadway was sold-out.

=== Original Broadway production ===
During production of the show, executive producer Craig Zadan said: "We stand on the set, watch the Bombshell numbers and say, "Wouldn’t this be great on Broadway? And so far that’s where we’ve left it. Our priority now is producing a great TV show".

In June 2015 following the sold-out performance at the Minskoff Theatre, it was announced that Bombshell would head to the Broadway stage. The executive producers of Smash and the Bombshell concert, Neil Meron and Craig Zadan, planned to executive produce the Broadway production. However, as of 2017, it was still in development, and Craig Zadan died in 2018. In 2020, it was revealed SMASH would be turned into a musical, rather than Bombshell, and on May 20, 2022 Marc Shaiman, Steven Spielberg, and Megan Hilty among others, completed the first read through of the new show.

== Musical numbers ==
=== TV Show/Album ===
Act I

- "Let Me Be Your Star" – Norma Jeane Mortenson
- "At Your Feet" – Gladys, Young Norma Jeane, Tourists and Hollywood Citizens
- "Never Give All the Heart" – Norma Jeane
- "The 20th Century Fox Mambo" – Marilyn Monroe and Twentieth Century Fox Studio Staff
- "The National Pastime" – Marilyn and New York Yankees
- "History is Made at Night" – Marilyn, Joe DiMaggio and Lovers
- "I Never Met a Wolf Who Didn't Love to Howl" – Marilyn and Troops
- "Mr. & Mrs. Smith" – Marilyn and Joe DiMaggio
- "Don't Say Yes Until I Finish Talking" – Darryl F. Zanuck and Studio Executives
- "Smash!" – Aspiring Actresses
- "On Lexington & 52nd Street" – Joe DiMaggio, Marilyn, Reporter, and New York Citizens
- "Cut, Print...Moving On" – Marilyn and Studio Staff

Act II

- "Dig Deep" – Marilyn, Lee Strasberg and Students
- "Public Relations" – Marilyn and Press
- "Second Hand White Baby Grand" – Marilyn
- "They Just Keep Moving the Line" – Marilyn
- "Let's Be Bad" – Marilyn and the cast of Some Like It Hot
- "The Right Regrets" – Arthur Miller
- "(Let's Start) Tomorrow Tonight" - Nat King Cole
- "Our Little Secret" – John F. Kennedy and Marilyn
- "Hang the Moon" – Gladys and Marilyn
- "Second Hand White Baby Grand (Reprise)" - Marilyn Monroe
- "Mr. and Mrs. Smith (Reprise)" - Joe DiMaggio
- "Don't Forget Me" – Marilyn

=== Benefit Concert ===
Act I

- "Let Me Be Your Star" – Katharine McPhee and Megan Hilty
- "At Your Feet"‡ – Donna McKechnie & Ripley Sobo
- "The 20th Century Fox Mambo" – Katharine McPhee
- "Never Give All the Heart" – Katharine McPhee
- "The National Pastime" – Megan Hilty
- "History is Made at Night" – Megan Hilty and Will Chase
- "I Never Met a Wolf Who Didn't Love to Howl" – Ann Harada
- "Mr. & Mrs. Smith" – Megan Hilty and Will Chase
- "Don't Say Yes Until I Finish Talking" – Christian Borle
- "On Lexington & 52nd Street" – Will Chase
- "They Just Keep Moving the Line" – Megan Hilty

Act II

- "Cut, Print...Moving On" – Jeremy Jordan
- "Public Relations" – Katharine McPhee
- "Second Hand White Baby Grand" – Megan Hilty
- "(Let's Start) Tomorrow Tonight" – Leslie Odom Jr.
- "The Right Regrets" – Brian D'Arcy James
- "Let's Be Bad" – Megan Hilty
- "Hang the Moon" – Donna McKechnie and Megan Hilty
- "Don't Forget Me" – Katharine McPhee and Megan Hilty
- "Big Finish" (Encore) – Katharine McPhee and Megan Hilty

‡ Number cut from the People.com broadcast of the production

== Casts and characters ==
Character	Fictitious Workshop Cast	Fictitious Boston Previews Cast	Fictitious Broadway Cast	Original Concert Cast
Norma Jeane / Marilyn Monroe	Ivy Lynn (Megan Hilty)	Rebecca Duvall (Uma Thurman), Karen Cartwright (Katharine McPhee)	Ivy Lynn (Megan Hilty)	Katharine McPhee/Megan Hilty
Joe DiMaggio	Michael Swift (Will Chase)	Michael Swift (Will Chase)	N/A	Will Chase
Arthur Miller	Petey (Glenn Kalison)	Petey (Glenn Kalison)	Petey (Glenn Kalison)	Brian d'Arcy James
Darryl F. Zanuck	—N/a	Marc Kudisch	Marc Kudisch	Christian Borle
John F. Kennedy	—N/a	—N/a	Simon (Julian Ovenden)	—N/a
Lee Strasberg	Justin (Henry Stram)	Justin (Henry Stram)	Justin (Henry Stram)	—N/a
Johnny Hyde	Dave (Tim Wright)	Dave (Tim Wright)	Dave (Tim Wright)	—N/a
Gladys Baker	—N/a	—N/a	Leigh Conroy (Bernadette Peters)	Donna McKechnie
Young Norma Jeane	—N/a	—N/a	Sophia Anne Caruso	Ripley Sobo
Nat King Cole	—N/a	—N/a	Sam Strickland (Leslie Odom Jr.)	Leslie Odom Jr.
