= Robyn Hurder =

American actress

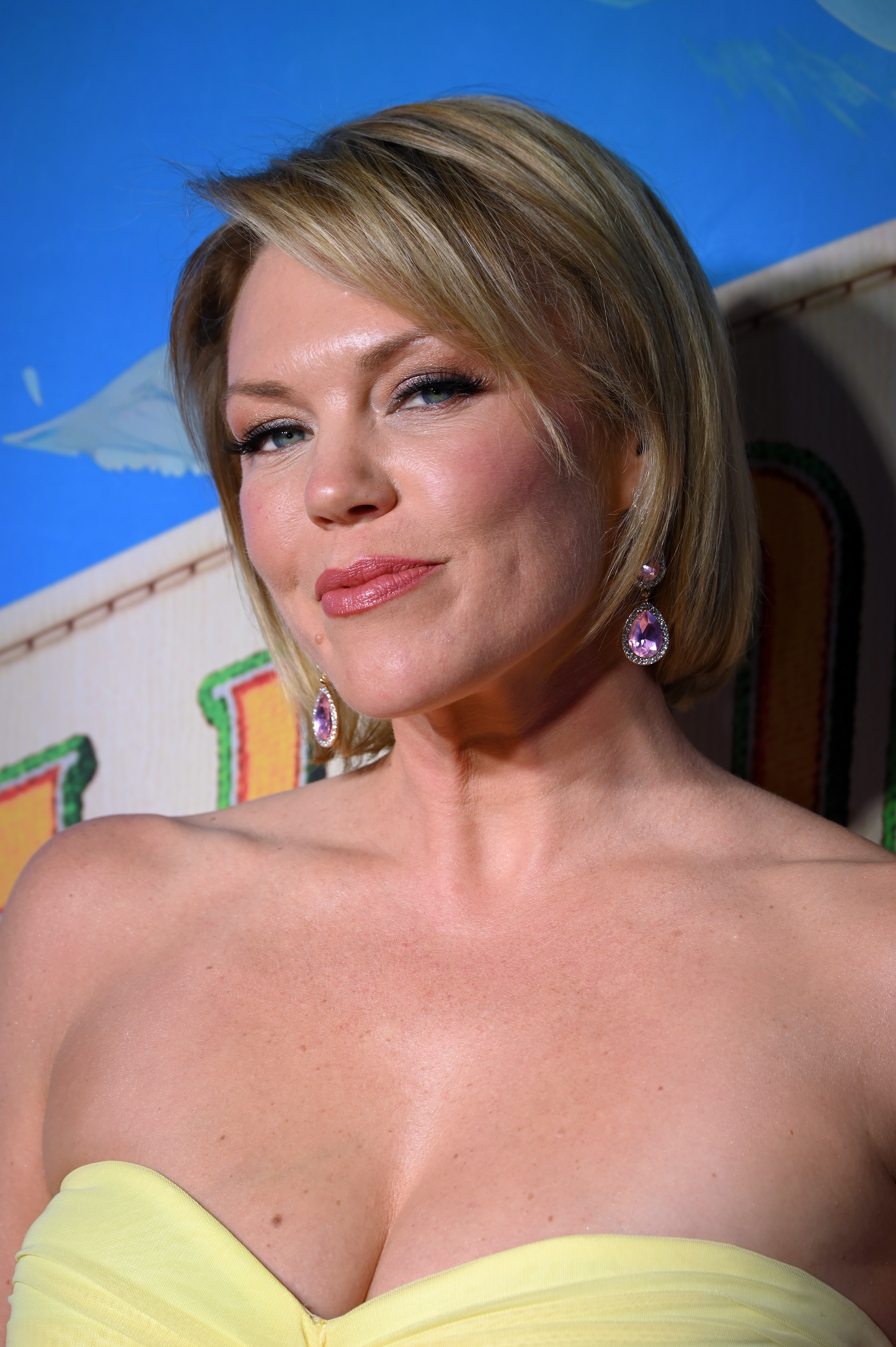
- Hurder in 2026
- Born: January 1, 1982 (age 44); Nashua, New Hampshire
- Education: University of New Hampshire
- Occupations: Actress; dancer
- Years active: 2003–present
- Spouse: Clyde Alves

Robyn Hurder (born January 1, 1982) is an American musical theater actress. She is best known for originating the role of Nini in the stage adaptation of Moulin Rouge! on Broadway, a performance for which she was nominated for the Tony Award for Best Featured Actress in a Musical.

She has performed in the Broadway shows Nice Work If You Can Get It (2012–2013), Grease (2007–2008), The Wedding Singer (2006), and Chitty Chitty Bang Bang (2005). She has taken part in a number of regional productions and Encores! stagings, and the national tours of A Chorus Line (2010), Spamalot (2006), and Starlight Express (2003–2004). She also originated the role of Ivy Lynn, who plays Marilyn Monroe in the Broadway musical adaptation of Smash.

== Personal life ==
Born in New Hampshire, Hurder grew up in Windham, Maine outside of Portland. A dancer and singer growing up, she attended the University of New Hampshire for two years before moving to New York City to pursue musical theater. She is married to fellow Broadway performer Clyde Alves.

== Acting credits ==
=== Stage ===
Year	Title	Role	Venue	Notes
2003–04	Starlight Express	Wrench (u/s: Pearl, Dinah, et al.)	2nd National Tour	US tour
2005	Chitty Chitty Bang Bang	Violet, Ensemble	Lyric Theatre	Broadway original cast
2006	Spamalot	Ensemble (u/s: Lady of the Lake)	1st National Tour	US tour
2006	The Wedding Singer	Donatella (u/s: Holly)	Al Hirschfeld Theatre	Broadway replacement
2007	Chicago	Mona (u/s: Roxie Hart)	Ambassador Theatre	Broadway replacement
2007–08	Grease	Marty	Brooks Atkinson Theatre	Broadway revival cast
2009–10	A Chorus Line	Cassie	3rd National Tour	US/CA tour replacement
2011	Tour de Fierce		47th Street Theatre	Off-Broadway (NYMT Festival)
2011	Play It Cool	Lena	Acorn Theatre	Off-Broadway original cast
2012–13	Nice Work If You Can Get It	Jeannie Muldoon	Imperial Theatre	Broadway original cast
2015	Paint Your Wagon		New York City Center	Encores! concert
2015	Victor/Victoria	Norma Cassidy	Ogunquit Playhouse	Regional
2015	Kiss Me Kate	Lois Lane / Bianca	Sidney Harman Hall	Regional
2016–18	Chicago	Mona (u/s: Roxie Hart)	Ambassador Theatre; May – September 2016; January 2017 – February 2018	Broadway replacement
2016	Crazy For You	Polly Baker	Drury Lane Theatre	Regional
2017	The New Yorkers	Lola McGee	New York City Center	Encores! concert
2017	From Here to Eternity	Karen Holmes	Ogunquit Playhouse	Regional
2018	Kiss Me Kate	Lois Lane / Bianca	5th Avenue Theatre	Regional
2018	A Chorus Line	Cassie	New York City Center	Encores! concert
2018	Moulin Rouge!	Nini	Emerson Colonial Theatre	Regional original cast
2019–22	Moulin Rouge!	Nini	Al Hirschfeld Theatre	Broadway original cast
2022	A Beautiful Noise	Marcia	Emerson Colonial Theatre	Regional original cast
2022	A Beautiful Noise	Marcia	Broadhurst Theatre	Broadway Original Cast
2024	Chicago	Velma Kelly	Ambassador Theatre	Broadway replacement
2025	Smash	Ivy	Imperial Theatre	Broadway original cast
2025	High Society	Tracy Samantha Lord	Ogunquit Playhouse	Regional
2026	Chicago	Velma Kelly	Ambassador Theatre	Broadway replacement

=== Filmography ===
Year	Title	Role	Notes
2019	Fosse/Verdon	Dancer	3 episodes
2020	The Right Girl		Filmed stage musical
2025	The Equalizer	Linda Bass	1 episode

== Awards ==
Year	Award	Category	Nominated work	Result	Ref.
2016	Helen Hayes Awards	Outstanding Supporting Actress in a Musical	Kiss Me Kate (Washington, DC)	Won	
2016	Emery Battis Award for Acting Excellence		Kiss Me Kate (Washington, DC)	Won	
2018	Gregory Awards	Supporting Actress, Musical	Kiss Me, Kate (Seattle)	Nominated	
2020	Tony Awards	Best Performance by a Featured Actress in a Musical	Moulin Rouge!	Nominated	
2023	Chita Rivera Award	Outstanding Dancer in a Broadway Show	A Beautiful Noise	Won	
2025	Chita Rivera Award	Outstanding Dancer in a Broadway Show	Smash	Won	
