= Don't Forget Me (Smash song) =

2012 single by the cast of Smash

Single by Smash cast feat. Katharine McPhee

from the album Bombshell
- Released: May 14, 2012
- Recorded: 2012
- Genre: Pop
- Length: 3:14
- Label: Columbia
- Composer: Marc Shaiman
- Lyricists: Marc Shaiman; Scott Wittman
- Producer: Marc Shaiman

"Don't Forget Me" is an original song introduced in the fifteenth episode of the first season of the musical TV series "Smash", entitled "Bombshell". It was written by Marc Shaiman and Scott Wittman, but in the show's fictional universe, it was written by the songwriting team of Tom Levitt (Christian Borle) and Julia Houston (Debra Messing) for their Marilyn Monroe musical Bombshell.

In the episode, the song is sung by Karen Cartwright (Katharine McPhee) as Marilyn Monroe during a Boston preview for the musical after having just taken over the role from Rebecca Duvall (Uma Thurman), who has been felled by illness.

The song is reprised by Ivy Lynn (Megan Hilty) in the twelfth episode of Season 2, "Opening Night", as part of the performance of Bombshell's opening night on Broadway opening, with Ivy playing the lead of Marilyn.

The song was initially released as a single from iTunes and Amazon.com's MP3 store and is currently available on the cast album Bombshell.

== Production ==
The song is about Marilyn Monroe's legacy, how she will inspire people, and make the world a better place through her tragic 'cautionary tale'. It has a tempo of quarter = 138 and is described as "Moderately flowing". The song ranges from F#3 to Eb5. It starts off in the key of E Major, but has a key change after the first chorus to F Major and another at the end of the bridge to G-flat Major.

Within the context of the series, the song is written by the songwriting duo as a finale song in under 3 hours after a reprise of Let Me Be Your Star in a suicide scene was deemed too depressing as the final number. After all the drama that went on beforehand, "Karen walks out onstage [after managing to memorize the song in record time] and brings down the house with 'Don’t Forget Me'. As the song ends, "we see Ivy back in the dressing room with a bottle of pills". Chris Rovzar of Vanity Fair suggests the following, "we don’t hear the final response from the Bombshell audience, but the way they reacted during the key change in “Don’t Forget Me” suggests they were poised to give a standing ovation". The song ends with the camera spinning in a circle around Karen as she "triumphant[ly] flail[s]...her arm[s in the air]".

== Critical reception ==
“Don’t Forget Me”, a final energetic ballad that led into a “Let Me Be Your Star” reprise [is an example of how the show's best element has always been its original music]. Even though I was furious that it was McPhee singing it and not Megan Hilty...the song moved me, and I thought it was a fitting way to end a musical about the life of Marilyn Monroe. She pleads for the audience to remember her good qualities, how hard she strived, and not how hard she suffered. She wants to be a legend. A tall order, but as Marilyn is the textbook definition of legend in our culture, it doesn't feel stretched, and even the fade-in of a large projection of her face comes at just the right moment. It’s sappy and overstated, sure, but so is much of the best work on Broadway, and I know I would have applauded like mad for that finale had I been in the audience...[Karen] brings it home, and it’s magical. This is one of Tom and Julia’s best songs yet, [and is worth] 4.5 out of 5 Jazz Hands.

— Rachel Syme, 'Smash' finale recap: Let Megan Hilty be your star, Los Angeles Times.

Chris Rovzar of Vanity Fair comments that "the lyrics were terrible and the composition spotty", and questions whether this was because within the context of the episode, "Tom and Julia supposedly did write it in just three hours", or because Shaiman and Wittman had genuine faith on the song. While he says that Karen "hit [the song] out of the park", he suggests that some lyrics were less than believable, such as "help for the downtrodden”, which he argues was never "one of Marilyn’s signature messages".

Though he gave the show as a whole much praise, even stating that "[he'd] buy tickets for it tomorrow if the show actually existed", Michael Slezak of TV Line gave "Don't Forget Me" a negative review, describing the "final ballad [that] Tom and Julia cook...up for Karen" as "downright embarrassing". He described the music as in the style of "rejected Disney princess theme songs", and also criticized the out-of-place and cheesy lyrics, such as, ”when you sing happy birthday to someone you love/or see diamonds you wish were all free/ Please say that you won’t, I pray that you don’t forget me”. He claims that the song requires a rewrite.

PerezHilton.com described Don't Forget Me as a "breathtaking finale performance".

JJ of TV Is My Pacifier said of the song, "the orchestration was amazing, the lyrics worked, and it really tied into Marilyn and the music of 'Bombshell'. I couldn't have imagined a better finale".

Idolhead wrote in his blog that the song is "one for the ages", and speculated it would be up for an award, along with “Let Me Be Your Star”, the unofficial theme song of the show.

Nathaniel Rogers of Thefilmexperience.net describes the song as "the second worst original song in a generally sensational musical score", and described it as a "weak song" that sounds like the "interchangeable anthemic ballads that they always end American Idol with". He gave the song a C− grade.

Jonathan Elliott of CinemaBlend.com describes the song as a "nice capper on the season".

Pat Cerasaro of broadwayworld.com describes "Don't Forget Me" as the "spine-tingling new swan song epilogue for the show-within-the-show".

== Charts ==
Chart (2012)	Peak position
US Bubbling Under Hot 100 (Billboard)	18
US Pop Digital Songs (Billboard)	33
