= Catch Me If You Can =

2002 film by Steven Spielberg

- Theatrical release poster
- Directed by: Steven Spielberg
- Screenplay by: Jeff Nathanson
- Based on: Catch Me If You Can by Frank Abagnale Jr. Stan Redding
- Produced by: Steven Spielberg; Walter F. Parkes
- Starring: Leonardo DiCaprio; Tom Hanks; Christopher Walken; Martin Sheen; Nathalie Baye
- Cinematography: Janusz Kamiński
- Edited by: Michael Kahn
- Music by: John Williams
- Production companies: DreamWorks Pictures; Amblin Entertainment; Parkes/MacDonald Productions; Kemp Company; Splendid Pictures
- Distributed by: DreamWorks Distribution, LLC
- Release dates: December 18, 2002 (Westwood); December 25, 2002 (United States)
- Running time: 141 minutes
- Country: United States
- Language: English
- Budget: $52 million
- Box office: $352.1 million

Catch Me If You Can is a 2002 American biographical black comedy crime film directed and produced by Steven Spielberg and starring Leonardo DiCaprio and Tom Hanks with Christopher Walken, Martin Sheen, Nathalie Baye, Amy Adams and James Brolin in supporting roles. The screenplay by Jeff Nathanson is based on the semi-autobiographical book by Frank Abagnale Jr., who claims that prior to his 19th birthday, he successfully performed cons worth millions of dollars by posing as a Pan American World Airways pilot, a Georgia doctor, and a Louisiana parish prosecutor. However, the truth of his story has since been heavily disputed.

A movie version of Abagnale's book was contemplated soon after it was published in 1980 but began in earnest in 1997 when Spielberg's DreamWorks bought the film rights. David Fincher, Gore Verbinski, Lasse Hallström, Miloš Forman and Cameron Crowe were all considered to direct the film before Spielberg decided to direct it himself. Filming took place from February to May 2002.

The film opened on December 25, 2002, to major critical and commercial success, grossing $352 million worldwide. At the 75th Academy Awards, Christopher Walken and John Williams were nominated for Best Supporting Actor and Best Original Score, respectively.

== Plot ==
In 1969, FBI agent Carl Hanratty arrives in Marseille, France, to pick up prisoner Frank Abagnale Jr., who has fallen ill due to the prison's poor conditions.

In a flashback, Frank is living in New Rochelle, New York, with his father, Frank Sr., and his French mother, Paula, in 1963. During his youth, he witnesses his father's many techniques for conning people, but Frank Sr.'s tax problems with the IRS eventually force the family to move from their house and into a small apartment.

One day, Frank discovers his mother is having an affair with Jack Barnes, his father's friend from the New Rochelle Rotary Club. When his parents divorce, Frank runs away. Needing money, he turns to confidence scams to survive and his cons progressively grows bolder. He poses as a Pan Am pilot named Frank Taylor and forges payroll checks from Pan Am. Soon, his forgeries are worth millions of dollars.

News of the crimes reaches the FBI and Carl begins tracking Frank. He finds him at a motel, but Frank tricks Carl into believing he is a Secret Service agent named Barry Allen. He escapes before Carl realizes the deception.

Adopting a new identity as Dr. Frank Conners, Frank falls in love with Brenda, a naive young hospital nurse, and asks her attorney father for both her hand in marriage and help with arrangements to take the Louisiana State Bar exam, which Frank passes. Carl tracks Frank to his and Brenda's engagement party, but Frank escapes through a bedroom window, telling Brenda to meet him at Miami International Airport two days later.

At the airport, Frank spots Brenda but also plainclothes agents. He realizes she has been followed and drives away. Reassuming his pilot identity, he stages a recruiting drive for stewardesses at a local college. Surrounded by eight young women dressed as stewardesses, which distracts the agents at the airport, Frank escapes on a flight to Madrid.

In 1967, Carl tracks Frank down in his mother's hometown of Montrichard, France, and convinces him to surrender to the French police. Frank is arrested and taken into custody there, but Carl assures him he will be extradited to the U.S.

In 1969, Carl accompanies Frank on a flight to the U.S. As they approach, Carl informs Frank that his father has died. Grief-stricken, Frank escapes from the plane through a toilet and reaches the house of his mother, who is now married to Barnes and is living with him and their young daughter. Heartbroken by his mother having a new family, Frank surrenders to Carl and a judge sentences him to 12 years in a maximum-security prison.

Carl visits Frank in prison; he shows him a fraudulent check from a case he is investigating. Frank immediately deduces that a bank teller was involved in the fraud. Impressed, Carl convinces the FBI to allow Frank to serve the remainder of his sentence working for the FBI Financial Crimes Unit. Frank agrees, but soon grows restless doing the tedious office work.

One weekend, Frank prepares to impersonate a pilot again but is intercepted by Carl, who says he is willing to let him continue with his con, assuring Frank that no one is chasing him and that it is his choice. Frank returns to work the following week. As they discuss another fraudulent check, Carl asks him how he cheated on the Louisiana State Bar exam, and Frank tells him he did not cheat, but studied for two weeks and passed it. Carl smiles and asks Frank if he is telling the truth, but Frank does not answer, instead giving Carl input on the check.

The closing titles state that (as of 1991) Frank has now been married for 26 years, has three sons and is living in the Midwestern United States, and that he has remained friends with Carl and has made a living as a leading expert on bank fraud and forgery.

== Cast ==
Leonardo DiCaprio and the real Frank Abagnale Jr.

- Leonardo DiCaprio as Frank Abagnale Jr.
- Tom Hanks as Carl Hanratty
- Christopher Walken as Frank Abagnale Sr.
- Nathalie Baye as Paula Abagnale
- Amy Adams as Brenda Strong
- Martin Sheen as Roger Strong
- Nancy Lenehan as Carol Strong
- James Brolin as Jack Barnes
- Brian Howe as Earl Amdursky
- Frank John Hughes as Tom Fox
- Chris Ellis as Special Agent Witkins
- John Finn as FBI Assistant Director Marsh
- Candice Azzara as Darcy
- Malachi Throne as Abe Penner
- Alfred Dennis as Ira Penner
- Amy Acker as Miggy Acker
- Ellen Pompeo as Marci
- Elizabeth Banks as Lucy Forrest
- Kaitlin Doubleday as Joanna
- Jennifer Garner as Cheryl Ann
- Guy Thauvette as Warden Garren
- Thomas Kopache as Principal Evans
- James Morrison as a pilot
- Robert Symonds as Mr. Rosen
- Jasmine Jessica Anthony as Paula's daughter

The real Frank Abagnale appears in a cameo appearance as a French police officer arresting his onscreen counterpart.

== Production ==
=== Development ===
Frank Abagnale sold the film rights to his autobiography in 1980. According to Abagnale, producers Norman Lear and Bud Yorkin purchased the film rights after seeing him on The Tonight Show Starring Johnny Carson. Two years later, they sold the rights to Columbia Pictures, who, in turn, sold the rights to producer Hall Bartlett. Bartlett and business partner Michael J. Lasky hired Steven Kunes to write the screenplay, but Bartlett died before the project found a distributor. The rights were then sold to Hollywood Pictures, a division of Disney, and when the project went into turnaround, the rights were again sold to Bungalow 78 Productions, a division of TriStar Pictures. From there, the project was presented to Steven Spielberg at DreamWorks Pictures.

According to Daily Variety, executive producer Michel Shane purchased the film rights in 1990 for Paramount Pictures. By December 1997, Barry Kemp purchased the film rights from Shane, bringing the project to DreamWorks, with Jeff Nathanson writing the script. By April 2000, David Fincher was attached to direct over the course of a few months, but dropped out in favor of Panic Room. In July 2000, Leonardo DiCaprio had entered discussions to star, with Gore Verbinski to direct. Spielberg signed on as producer, and filming was set to begin in March 2001.

=== Casting ===
Verbinski cast James Gandolfini as Carl Hanratty, Ed Harris as Frank Abagnale Sr. and Chloë Sevigny as Brenda Strong. Verbinski dropped out because of DiCaprio's commitment to Gangs of New York. Lasse Hallström was in negotiations to direct by May 2001, but dropped out in July 2001. At this stage, Harris and Sevigny left the film, but DiCaprio and Gandolfini were still attached. Spielberg, co-founder of DreamWorks, offered the job of director to Miloš Forman, and considered hiring Cameron Crowe. During this negotiation period, Spielberg began to consider directing the film himself, eventually dropping projects such as Big Fish and Memoirs of a Geisha. Spielberg officially committed to directing in August 2001. That same month, Tom Hanks was cast to replace Gandolfini, who had exited due to scheduling conflicts with The Sopranos.

The search for Sevigny's replacement as Brenda Strong lasted months, but Amy Adams was eventually cast. Spielberg "loved" her tape, and producer Walter F. Parkes commented that she was "as fresh and honest as anyone we'd seen", which was an important element in the role. Christopher Walken was cast as Frank Abagnale Sr. following Parkes's suggestion. Martin Sheen played Roger Strong, as he had "intimidating presence". Spielberg wanted a French actress to portray Paula Abagnale to stay true to the facts. He asked for the help of Brian De Palma, who was living in Paris, and he did tests with several actresses such as Nathalie Baye. Spielberg had seen Jennifer Garner on Alias and offered her a small role in the film.

=== Filming ===
Filming was scheduled to begin in January 2002 but was pushed to February 7 in Los Angeles, California. Locations included Burbank, Downey, New York City, Ontario International Airport (which doubled for Miami International Airport), Quebec City and Montreal.

The film was shot in 147 locations in only 52 days. DiCaprio reflected, "Scenes that we thought would take three days took an afternoon." Filming ran from April 25–30 on Park Avenue, just outside the Waldorf-Astoria Hotel. Production moved to Orange, New Jersey, and returned to Brooklyn for bank and courthouse scenes. Shooting also took place at the TWA Flight Center at John F. Kennedy International Airport. Quebec City was chosen for its atmosphere. Place Royale, within Old Quebec, stands in for Montrichard, and the church in the background of the arrest scene is Notre-Dame-des-Victoires.

Filming ended on May 12 in Montreal.

== Soundtrack ==
The original score was composed and conducted by John Williams. The film's soundtrack was released on December 10, 2002, by DreamWorks Records.

Catch Me If You Can: Music from the Motion Picture
No.	Title	Music	Performer(s)	Length
1.	"Catch Me If You Can"			2:41
2.	"The Float"			4:56
3.	"Come Fly with Me"		Frank Sinatra	3:19
4.	"Recollections (The Father's Theme)"		Soloists: Alan Estes, vibraphone; Dan Higgins, saxophone	5:16
5.	"The Airport Scene"			2:26
6.	"The Girl from Ipanema"		Stan Getz and João Gilberto featuring Astrud Gilberto and Antonio Carlos Jobim	5:15
7.	"Learning the Ropes"			8:44
8.	"Father and Son"		Soloists: Alan Estes, vibraphone; Dan Higgins, saxophone	3:15
9.	"Embraceable You"		Judy Garland and Victor Young and His Orchestra	2:50
10.	"The Flash Comics Clue"			1:47
11.	"Deadheading"			2:25
12.	"The Christmas Song (Merry Christmas to You)"		Nat King Cole	3:10
13.	"A Broken Home"			4:25
14.	"Un Poco Adagio"	Haydn Concerto for Piano and Strings, No 11 in D-Major by Franz Joseph Haydn		3:12
15.	"The Look of Love"		Dusty Springfield	3:31
16.	"Catch Me If You Can (Reprise and End Credits)"			5:14
Total length:				62:26

== Historical accuracy ==
Abagnale had little involvement with the film, but believed Spielberg was the only filmmaker who "could do this film justice", despite various changes from purportedly real events. In November 2001, Abagnale said:

I am not a consultant on the film. I've never met or spoken to Steven Spielberg and I have not read the script. I prefer not to. I understand that they now portray my father in a better light, as he really was. Steven Spielberg has told the screenplay writer (Jeff Nathanson) that he wants complete accuracy in the relationships and actual scams that I perpetrated. I hope in the end the movie will be entertaining, exciting, funny and bring home an important message about family, childhood and divorce.

Abagnale said he never saw his father again after he ran away from home, but Spielberg "wanted to continue to have that connection where Frank kept trying to please his father; by making him proud of him; by seeing him in the uniform, the Pan-American uniform".

In a 2017 presentation for "Talks at Google", Abagnale commented on the accuracy of the film:

I've only seen the movie twice. So when the media asked me what I thought about the movie, and what was right and what was wrong, I said: "First of all I have two brothers and a sister; he portrayed me as an only child. In real life, my mother never remarried; there's a scene in the movie where she's remarried, and has a little girl. That didn't really happen. In real life I never saw my father after I ran away; in the movie they keep having him come back to Christopher Walken in the film. That didn't really happen. ... I escaped off the aircraft through the kitchen galley where they bring the food and stuff onto the plane; and there they had me escape through the toilet." I thought he stayed very close to the story, but pretty much all of that. He was very concerned about being accurate, first of all because it was the first time he made a movie about a real person living. Second the Bureau had an information officer on the set for all the shooting of the entire film to make sure that what he said about the FBI ... was accurate. ... And then of course, as he later said, "I really got most of my information from those three retired agents" ... So I thought he did a good job of staying very, very accurate at the movie.

In addition, the FBI agent whom Abagnale alleges tracked and later worked with him was Joseph Shea; Abagnale has said that because Shea did not want his name used in the film, the character was renamed Carl and given the surname Hanratty, based on the football player Terry Hanratty.

Despite his claim that Spielberg "stayed very close to the story", records show Abagnale was in the Great Meadow Correctional Facility in Fort Ann, New York, between ages 17 and 20 (July 26, 1965, to December 24, 1968, inmate #25367), and before that, he was in the United States Navy (December 1964 to February 1965). Six weeks after his release from Great Meadow, on February 14, 1969, he was rearrested in Baton Rouge, Louisiana. He was jailed locally, and in June 1969, he was convicted of stealing from a local family-owned small business in Baton Rouge.

Abagnale did dress as a Pan American Airlines pilot for a brief period in the fall of 1970. He was arrested in Cobb County, Georgia, on November 2, 1970. Federal court records associated with his conviction show he only cashed 10 personal checks with a Pan American Airlines logo, totaling less than $1,500. The facts behind many of Abagnale's exaggerated claims, and their inclusion or omission from the film, were the subject of renewed media reporting in 2021.

In 1978, several journalists debunked his claim that he passed the Louisiana bar and worked for Attorney General Jack P. F. Gremillion. Journalist Ira Perry was unable to find evidence that Abagnale worked with the FBI; according to one retired FBI Special Agent in Charge, Abagnale was caught trying to pass fraudulent checks in 1978, several years after he claimed he began working with the FBI.

== Themes ==
Catch Me if You Can deals with themes of broken homes and troubled childhoods. Spielberg's parents divorced when he was a teenager, similar to Frank Abagnale's situation. In the film, Carl Hanratty is also divorced from his wife, who lives with their daughter in Chicago. "Some of my films have had to do with broken homes and people on the run from their sad pasts," Spielberg stated:

But there are those strands that got me to say: you know, there's something also about me that I can say through the telling of this kind of lighthearted story.

Spielberg also wanted to create a film that sympathized with a crook. He explained:

Frank was a 21st-century genius working within the innocence of the mid '60s, when people were more trusting than they are now. I don't think this is the kind of movie where somebody could say, 'I have a career plan.'

== Release ==
I know that Hollywood has made a number of changes to the story, but I am honored that Steven Spielberg, Leonardo DiCaprio and Tom Hanks participated in the making of the movie inspired by my life. It is important to understand that it is just a movie, not a biographical documentary.

— Frank Abagnale's reaction to the film

DreamWorks was careful to market the film as "inspired by a true story" to avoid controversy similar to that surrounding A Beautiful Mind (2001) and The Hurricane (1999), both of which deviated from history. The premiere took place at Westwood, Los Angeles, California, on December 18, 2002.

To promote the film, Game Show Network aired the 1977 episode of the television game show To Tell the Truth that featured Frank Abagnale. Segments were shown on December 29, 2002, and January 1, 2003, as promotion.

== Home media ==
Catch Me If You Can was released on DVD and VHS on May 6, 2003, by DreamWorks Home Entertainment. The DVD was released as a two-disc Special Edition with special features and footage by director Steven Spielberg, as well as interviews. By December 2003, the DVD sold 3.2 million copies, earning a profit of more than $56.3 million. For the film's 10th anniversary, a Blu-ray version was released on December 4, 2012, and a 20th anniversary Blu-ray version followed on October 4, 2022.

== Reception ==
=== Box office ===
Catch Me If You Can was released on December 25, 2002, earning slightly more than $30 million in 3,225 theaters during its opening weekend, in second place behind The Lord of the Rings: The Two Towers. The film went on to gross $164.6 million in North America and $187.5 million in foreign countries, with a worldwide total of $352.1 million. The film was a financial success, recouping the $52 million budget by seven times. Catch Me If You Can was the eleventh highest-grossing film of 2002; Minority Report, also a Spielberg film, was the tenth highest.

=== Critical response ===
On Rotten Tomatoes, Catch Me If You Can has a rating of 96%, based on 203 reviews, with an average rating of 8.1/10. The site's critical consensus reads: "With help from a strong performance by Leonardo DiCaprio as real-life wunderkind con artist Frank Abagnale, Steven Spielberg crafts a film that's stylish, breezily entertaining, and surprisingly sweet." On Metacritic, the film has a score of 75 out of 100, based on 39 critics, indicating "generally favorable" reviews. Audiences polled by CinemaScore gave the film an average grade of "A−" on a scale of A+ to F.

Roger Ebert of the Chicago Sun-Times heavily praised DiCaprio's performance, and concluded, "This is not a major Spielberg film, although it is an effortlessly watchable one".

Mick LaSalle of the San Francisco Chronicle said it was "not Spielberg's best movie, but one of his smoothest and maybe his friendliest. The colorful cinematography, smart performances and brisk tempo suggest a filmmaker subordinating every other impulse to the task of manufacturing pleasure."

Stephen Hunter of the Washington Post believed DiCaprio shows "the range and ease and cleverness that Martin Scorsese so underutilized in Gangs of New York".

James Berardinelli observed, "Catch Me if You Can never takes itself or its subjects too seriously, and contains more genuinely funny material than about 90% of the so-called 'comedies' found in multiplexes these days." Berardinelli praised John Williams's film score, which he felt was "more intimate and jazzy than his usual material, evoking (intentionally) Henry Mancini".

Peter Travers of Rolling Stone was one of few who gave the film a negative review; he considered the film to be "bogged down over 140 minutes. A film that took off like a hare on speed ends like a winded tortoise."

In 2025, filmmaker Rob Marshall cited the film as among his favorites of the 21st century.

== Accolades ==
Award	Category	Nominee(s)	Result
Academy Awards	Best Supporting Actor	Christopher Walken	Nominated
Academy Awards	Best Original Score	John Williams	Nominated
Art Directors Guild	Excellence in Production Design for a Contemporary Film	Jeannine Oppewall	Won
BAFTA Awards	Best Actor in a Supporting Role	Christopher Walken	Won
BAFTA Awards	Best Adapted Screenplay	Jeff Nathanson	Nominated
BAFTA Awards	Best Costume Design	Mary Zophres	Nominated
BAFTA Awards	Best Original Music	John Williams	Nominated
Critics' Choice Awards	Best Picture		Nominated
Critics' Choice Awards	Best Director	Steven Spielberg	Won
Critics' Choice Awards	Best Score	John Williams	Won
Dallas–Fort Worth Film Critics Association Awards	Best Film		Nominated
Dallas–Fort Worth Film Critics Association Awards	Best Supporting Actor	Christopher Walken	Nominated
Dallas–Fort Worth Film Critics Association Awards	Top 10 Films		Won
Golden Globe Awards	Best Actor in a Motion Picture – Drama	Leonardo DiCaprio	Nominated
Grammy Awards	Best Score Soundtrack for Visual Media	John Williams	Nominated
Los Angeles Film Critics Association Awards	Best Supporting Actor	Christopher Walken	Runner-up
National Society of Film Critics Awards	Best Supporting Actor	Christopher Walken	Won
Online Film Critics Society Awards	Best Adapted Screenplay	Jeff Nathanson	Nominated
Online Film Critics Society Awards	Best Original Score	John Williams	Nominated
Satellite Awards	Best Art Direction	Sarah Knowles	Nominated
Screen Actors Guild Awards	Outstanding Performance by a Male Actor in a Supporting Role	Christopher Walken	Won
Vancouver Film Critics Circle Awards	Best Supporting Actor	Christopher Walken	Nominated

== Musical adaptation ==
A musical adaptation premiered at the 5th Avenue Theatre in Seattle, Washington, in July 2009 starring Aaron Tveit and Norbert Leo Butz. It began previewing on Broadway at the Neil Simon Theatre on March 11, 2011, and officially opened April 10, 2011. The musical was nominated for four Tony Awards, including Best Musical.

== See also ==
- The Great Impostor, a 1961 film based on the story of an impostor named Ferdinand Waldo Demara
- The Pretender, a TV series
- VIPs, a 2010 film based on the story of Brazilian businessman, consultant, speaker, and former embezzler, Marcelo Nascimento Rocha
- List of 2002 films based on actual events

== Bibliography ==
- Frank Abagnale Jr. and Stan Redding. Catch Me If You Can: The Amazing True Story of the Youngest and Most Daring Con Man in the History of Fun and Profit. ISBN 0060529717.
