= Catch Me If You Can (book) =

Book by Frank Abagnale Jr.

- First hardcover edition (1980)
- Author: Frank Abagnale Jr. Stan Redding
- Cover artist: Hank Holland
- Language: English
- Genre: Mystery/Action
- Publisher: Grosset & Dunlap
- Publication date: 1980
- Publication place: United States
- Media type: Print (hardcover)
- Pages: 253
- ISBN: 0-448-16538-4
- LC Class: HV6760.A18 A33

Catch Me If You Can is a 1980 semi-autobiographical book about criminal exploits allegedly engaged in by Frank Abagnale Jr., an American onetime con artist. Abagnale claims that, as a young man, he cashed $2.5 million worth of bad checks while impersonating a Pan Am pilot, a doctor, a teacher, and an attorney. The book is acknowledged to have been partly fictionalized, and the actual basis for the events contained in the book has been challenged. Co-written by Abagnale and Stan Redding, Catch Me If You Can was adapted into a film of the same name by director Steven Spielberg in 2002. In the film, Abagnale was portrayed by actor Leonardo DiCaprio. In recent years, the veracity of many of Abagnale's claims of scams have been subject to scrutiny.

== Plot ==
=== Summary ===
The book is loosely based on the real con artistry exploits of Frank Abagnale. It is written in the first person and describes how Abagnale cashed $2.5 million worth of bad checks. He assumed various jobs, such as pretending to be a Pan Am pilot, a doctor, a teacher, and a lawyer, and for these impostures was pursued by the police and the FBI. Abagnale was eventually caught by the gendarmerie while living in France and served approximately five years in prison—six months in France, six months in Sweden, and four years in the United States. The book ends with an epilogue telling the story of Abagnale's final capture and his rehabilitation, which resulted in the creation of his security firm.

=== Details ===
Abagnale's parents discover his smalltime scheme. He has been profiting recklessly from a line of credit for auto work that was never done and car parts that were never sold. His father forgives him, but his mother sends him to boarding school for boys.

Between school terms, Frank is devastated when his parents decide to divorce. He runs away and takes up forging checks. He is easily mistaken for an adult, and uses this to his advantage by impersonating a 26-year-old in New York.

==== Impersonating a pilot ====
Inspired when he sees smiling pilots and pretty stewardesses leaving a hotel, Frank does some research on airline work culture. After some time, he successfully forges a pilot's license and lies his way into a warehouse. He gets a tailored uniform there identifying him as first officer for a commercial airline

Frank begins passing himself off as a deadhead (a pilot riding along in cockpits on the way to scheduled takeoff points) thus conning his way into free air travel. He explores cities throughout the U.S. and stays well ahead of his expenses with increasingly innovative check fraud.

One tense situation arises when he's brought in for questioning for reasons unclear. All those with whom he has direct interaction, though, see only a charismatic pilot with a license that looks real to their discerning eyes. He accepts their apologies for the inconvenience. (See also "Close calls" below.)

Eventually, Abagnale moves to Atlanta, into one of the new "swinging singles" apartment complexes, called River Bend. He enjoys the life of an unattached, wealthy playboy.

==== Impersonating a physician ====
He whimsically claims to be a doctor on his rental application. The application shows that he is graduated from Harvard University. At his first opportunity, he forges physician's credentials to supplement his cover.

Members of the local medical community respect his preference not to work, at first. When a position opens for head of a hospital, though, they insist Frank is the best temporary fit. Frank hesitantly accepts the job and comes up with tricks to improve his façade as he goes. He forms a relationship with one Brenda Strong, but the romance is overshadowed by his fear that the FBI could be close to tracking him down.

On one mortifying occasion, he is relieved that a tragedy is averted (no thanks to him) after he did not know what "blue baby" meant.

==== Impersonating a lawyer ====
After relocating again, Frank poses as a graduate of Berkeley Law School. He is again implored to fill a job opening and has the hiring conditions finagled for him.

One requirement is that he pass the state bar exam. He attempts it with a mix of quick studying and common sense. As if it is standard practice, it is returned after his first two attempts with his wrong answers marked. Thus he manages to pass without cheating on the third try.

He is mired all the while by his lack of knowledge about campus life at Harvard. He must constantly bluff his way through conversations (or evade them) with the real Harvard grads he meets.

==== Close calls ====
When Frank resumes his pilot persona, he recruits his own fake airplane crew at a flight attendant school on pretense of a commission for advertising stills. As his confidence increases, so do the amounts on his forged checks.

Investigators have one unwitting, face-to-face encounter with Frank. Keeping his cool, he flashes his wallet open and shut as if showing credentials. He then acts like just another law enforcement official until he can make an inconspicuous exit.

On another occasion, police have a chance to arrest Frank but lack grounds to do so for his known crimes. They invent vagrancy charges and book him on those instead.

Frank is soon bailed out by a bondsman who goes by the name "Bail-Out" Bailey. FBI Agent O'Riley arrives to find Frank gone. He assesses how that happened and barks that, having been paid by check, Bailey has just become a fraud victim. Frank later takes measures to ensure that Bailey actually gets paid.

==== Capture and prison life ====
Frank's wanderlust extends to international horizons. He forges a passport, then globetrots through different parts of Europe including France, trying to evade arrest.

One day while grocery shopping, Frank finds himself surrounded by gendarmerie who hold him at gunpoint. He has a moment of genuine mortal terror because the surrender commands they shout are contradictory (Should he lie down, kneel, or stand with hands on head?). He pleads with them not to shoot and submits to arrest.

He serves a long sentence at Perpignan's prison, barely surviving the subhuman living conditions. His only sympathetic visitor is a U.S. liaison who regrets to inform him this is typical for inmates.

After serving six months in Perpignan's prison, Frank is later transferred to Sweden. He stonewalls a few legal inquiries until he's made aware how fair their system is. With his cooperation, a defense attorney argues technicalities about the fraud charges and gets him a reduced sentence. He finds the prison system is much more hospitable.

The prospect of Frank being handed over to other countries with harsh prison systems, like Italy, earns him some sympathy. One of the higher-ups pulls some strings to have him extradited to the United States so he can be in his home country, at least.

==== Escapes ====
Frank is flown home where officials wait to take him into custody as he disembarks the plane. Instead, he escapes by unbolting the aircraft's toilet, dropping through to below-deck, dropping again to the runway, and legging it.

After his subsequent arrest, prison officials become suspicious of his dispassionate demeanor. It's atypical of new inmates. They insinuate that he's the undercover inspector and might as well admit it. Frank fans the flame of that false belief. He uses his outside contact privileges to call an old girlfriend and recruit her as an accomplice. According to plan, she calls back from one of two nearby payphones that stand side-by-side. The ruse is that a highly irregular matter needs Frank's immediate attention. The guards can verify this by calling a number provided for the proper authorization (actually the other payphone). Frank is let out and the girlfriend speeds him away. He then flees across the border into Canada where he's ultimately arrested again by Royal Canadian Mounted Police.

==== Going straight ====
Frank finally resolves to become a law-abiding citizen. Jobs aren't hard for him to get and managers tend to want to promote him. Consequently though, the employers run background checks and see little choice but to fire him in light of his criminal record.

He finally changes his life by offering his services (for free, at first) as a security consultant on a specialized lecture tour. He speaks to bank personnel, fully disclosing his forgery methods and ways to detect them. He goes on to found a firm that has been famous ever since.

== Veracity ==
The book is prefaced with the statement: "This book is based on the true-life exploits of Frank Abagnale. To protect the right of those whose paths have crossed the author's, all of the characters and some of the events have been altered, and all names, dates and places have been changed." The character of FBI Agent O'Riley is known to be based on Joseph Shea, with whom Abagnale went on to form a lifetime friendship.

After Abagnale spoke at a seminar in 1978, two years before the book's publication, a San Francisco Chronicle reporter phoned a number of institutions that Abagnale mentioned to confirm his claims and found no evidence for them. Abagnale responded that he doubted anyone would confirm them due to embarrassment. He later said he had changed the names.

In 2002, Abagnale addressed the issue of the book's truthfulness with a statement posted on his company's website which said (in part): "I was interviewed by the co-writer only about four times. I believe he did a great job of telling the story, but he also over-dramatized and exaggerated some of [it]. That was his style and what the editor wanted. He always reminded me that he was just telling a story and not writing my biography." Specifically he addressed details such as the amount of money he wrote in bad checks, and the years in which his crimes took place.

In 2020, journalist Alan C. Logan made an in-depth investigation as part of publishing a book on Abagnale's life story, finding earlier newspaper articles that cast doubt on Abagnale's story and locating numerous administrative documents that contradicted many of Abagnale's claims. Logan's investigation found that Abagnale's claims were, for the most part, fabrications. Documents show that Abagnale was in Great Meadow Prison in Comstock, New York, between the ages of 17 and 20 (July 26, 1965, and December 24, 1968) as inmate #25367, the time frame during which Abagnale would claim to have committed his most significant scams. Logan's investigation uncovered numerous petty crimes that Abagnale has never acknowledged, and Logan offers evidence to argue that many of Abagnale's most famous scams in fact never occurred.

== Film adaptation ==
The 2002 film Catch Me If You Can, directed by Steven Spielberg, stars Leonardo DiCaprio as Abagnale and Tom Hanks as his FBI pursuer, renamed Hanratty in the adaptation. The film is based upon his life and the autobiography and is mainly true to the source as Abagnale was a consultant to the writers, but some of the details were changed to create a more dramatic narrative for film. Abagnale is also credited in the film with a cameo as one of the French Police officers.

== Musical adaptation ==
Abagnale's life was adapted into a musical of the same name, which previewed on March 11, 2011, and opened on April 10 at the Neil Simon Theatre on Broadway. The show starred Aaron Tveit as Abagnale, Norbert Leo Butz, Tom Wopat and Kerry Butler. Butz won the Tony Award for Best Actor in a Musical at the 65th Tony Awards. The show closed September 4, 2011.
