= Joseph Shea (FBI agent) =

American law enforcement agent (1919–2005)

- Born: Joseph Gerald Shea; September 20, 1919; Brookline, Massachusetts, U.S.
- Died: August 4, 2005 (aged 85); Marietta, Georgia, U.S.
- Education: Boston College
- Occupation: Law enforcement official
- Spouse: Sarah Eugenia Blakeman (m. 1953; died 2004)
- Children: 2

Joseph Gerald Shea (/ʃeɪ/; September 20, 1919 – August 4, 2005) was an American law enforcement official who was a Special Agent for the U.S. Federal Bureau of Investigation (FBI).

== Early life and education ==
Shea was born in Brookline, Massachusetts, on September 20, 1919. He was the third child in a family of four sons born to Frank Shea, an Irish American, and his Irish-born wife, Alice Mary. The family moved in with their paternal grandmother after his mother's death, when he was eight. Shea joined the Army in 1942, after working at the Ritz Carlton Hotel and the Boston Navy Yard. He served in the 36th Division as a First Sergeant. He joined troops being sent to Europe on the Queen Mary, which was being used to transport troops overseas. The ship nearly went down at sea when hit by a rogue wave, but it righted itself and the 15,000 troops aboard were safe. He served in North Africa, Italy, and France during World War II. Following the war, Shea attended Boston College and majored in accounting.

== Career ==
After graduation, he started working for the Federal Bureau of Investigation, beginning as an identification clerk. In February 1951, he was appointed Special Agent. During his career, Shea worked in several offices, including Louisville, Chicago, and Atlanta. He worked on a number of notable cases, including the Barbara Mackle kidnapping and the Frank Abagnale case. He retired on December 31, 1977.

== Personal life ==
Shea met Sarah Eugenia Blakeman while working in Louisville in 1953. They were married from May 1953 until her death in 2004. They had two daughters, Reva and Ruth. After his retirement, Shea moved to Kentucky, where he and his wife lived on a farm and visited St. Thomas each winter. They returned to Marietta, Georgia, to live in 1997. Shea was an avid golfer.

== Death ==
Shea died in Marietta, Georgia, on August 4, 2005, at 85 and was buried at Georgia Memorial Park Cemetery. He is survived by his two daughters, nine grandchildren and two great-grandchildren.

== In popular culture ==
In the 2002 film Catch Me If You Can, the FBI agent Carl Hanratty (portrayed by Tom Hanks), is loosely based on the relationship that Shea had with Frank Abagnale. According to Frank Abagnale, his deep friendship with Shea, as portrayed in the film, lasted 30 years until Shea's death. However, The Atlanta Journal-Constitution reported that Abagnale and Shea only reunited in the late 1980s, almost 20 years after Shea arrested him.

A stage musical based on Abagnale's story was produced on Broadway in 2011. Norbert Leo Butz played Hanratty and won the Tony Award for Best Actor in a Musical.
