= Michel Shane =

Canadian-American film producer (born 1955)

- Born: Michel Kenneth Shane; October 8, 1955 (age 69); Montreal, Quebec, Canada
- Occupation: Film producer
- Years active: 1980s–present

Michel Shane (born October 8, 1955) is a Canadian-American film producer and co-founder of Hand Picked Films. He is best known for receiving an executive producer credit on Catch Me If You Can and I, Robot along with his business partner Anthony Romano. He also worked on a documentary titled 21 Miles in Malibu, which was released in 2023.

== Early life and career ==
Michel Shane was born in Montreal, Quebec, Canada, the son of Sheldon Gerald Shane, an industrial psychologist and psycho-therapist, and Vivien Ray (Shane), a Belgian World War II refugee who moved to New York at the age of nine. Shane got his first taste of the movie business in high school when he directed and produced a video short of Arthur Miller's "Death of a Salesman." Then, at age 17, he picked up a job as a page with CFCF, a local television network, followed by an internship at Columbia Pictures Television. In 1980, after graduating with a degree in Communication and Marketing from McGill University, he moved to Lansing, Michigan, to seek a degree in Entertainment Law at Cooley Law School. After two years, however, he left Cooley to enter the newly developing video industry.

In 1982, in an effort to study the emerging market, Shane attended a conference on the future of video in Fort Lauderdale, Florida, where he was mistaken as an industry expert by a local news affiliate. With this small break, he was able to develop connections and start MKS, an independent video distribution company, which at the beginning sold "How To" videos from the trunk of his car. Two years later, Shane turned MKS into the Prolusion Group with the help of a few business partners, and began to travel internationally purchasing new titles at film festivals he attended.

Leaving Prolusion in 1987, Shane began working in television distribution on his own, and started consulting work in Hollywood. During the next several years he produced "Return to the Titanic Live" and "Dracula Live From Transylvania" for television networks in Canada, and acquired the rights to the book, "Catch Me If You Can."

In 2005, Shane founded Hand Picked Films, an independent film and television production company, with business partner Anthony Romano. Romano is in charge of television production, and Michel Shane film production. Based in both Los Angeles and Montreal, Hand Picked has established itself as an international production company, recently producing films in Brazil, Italy, Croatia, India, Singapore, Australia and New Zealand.

Shane also teaches film finance and production classes at UCLA and is a touring lecturer on independent film financing. He is a motivational speaker as well.

Shane executive-produced 100 episodes of Bait Car on Tru- TV.

He has started a Kickstarter Campaign to fund a documentary called 21 Miles in Malibu which will examine the 27 miles of highway that runs through Malibu and hopes to find solutions for a road nicknamed Blood Alley. Shane hopes the documentary will be a template for change in all communities that have a highway running through them as a main thoroughfare.

Shane is producing a 26-part television series based on the classic book Sun Tzu's The Art of War. The series will be an action-adventure drama that tells the story of what inspired Sun Tzu to write the classic strategy book. Shane has attached both Japanese and Chinese partners to the project, joining US partners.

== Personal life ==
Shane has a younger brother, Reid, who is also a producer. Michel Shane now lives in Los Angeles, California, and is currently married with three daughters.

On April 3, 2010, Michel Shane's daughter Emily was murdered on Pacific Coast Highway in Malibu and the following year his wife started The Emily Shane Foundation ( www.emilyshane.org) to help children in middle school who were struggling by offering a mentorship/tutor program. The only cost to the child is that they must "Pass It Forward" by doing a good deed for each session. This is one of the corner stones of the foundation.

Since his father is Canadian, and his mother American, Michel Shane has dual Canadian-American citizenship.

== Filmography ==
=== Film ===
- A Christmas Story at the Vatican (1991) (producer)
- Rennie's Landing (2001) (producer)
- Catch Me If You Can (2002) (executive producer)
- Northfork (2003) (executive producer)
- I, Robot (2004) (executive producer)
- Statistics (2006) (executive producer)
- Badland (2007) (executive producer)
- Buff Enough (2009) (producer and executive producer)
- Blood: A Butcher's Tale (2009) (executive producer)
- Not Another Not Another Movie (2011) (executive producer)
- Vivaldi (2016) (producer)
- Quantum Village (????) (producer)

=== Television ===
- Return to the Titanic Live (1988) (producer)
- Dracula Live From Transylvania (1989) (producer)
- Dr. 90210 (2007) (actor)
- Bait Car ( 2007-2011) ( Executive Producer)
