= Created Equal =

Created Equal may refer to:

- Created Equal, a 1982 episode from Voyagers!
- JLA: Created Equal, a comic book series
- Created Equal (film), a 2017 film directed by Bill Duke

== See also ==
- All men are created equal, a phrase from the U.S. Declaration of Independence
