= Great Meadow Correctional Facility =

Maximum-security state prison for men located in New York, US

Coordinates: 43°27′27″N 73°25′59″W

- Interactive map of Great Meadow Correctional Facility
- Location: Comstock, Town of Fort Ann, Washington County, New York, USA
- Status: Closed
- Security class: Maximum
- Opened: February 11, 1911
- Closed: November 6, 2024
- Managed by: New York State Department of Corrections and Community Supervision

Great Meadow Correctional Facility was a maximum security prison in New York State in the United States. The prison is in Comstock, a hamlet right outside of the village of Fort Ann in Washington County, New York. As of September 3, 2008 it was home to 1,663 inmates. When Great Meadow opened in 1911 it was the fourth prison for adult males constructed in the state of New York. It closed down on November 6, 2024.

== Founding of the Prison ==
The 1,000 acres (4.0 km^{2}) of land that Great Meadow Correctional Facility sits on was purchased by the state of New York in 1905 from Isaac Baker. A mountain lake 2 mi (3.2 km) from the prison was the main source of water for the facility. The lake sat higher than the prison grounds allowing the transfer of water to be efficient. The original plans for the land was to build an institution for the mentally insane; however, such an institution was never erected. Instead, in 1909 New York legislature appropriated $350,000 to build a new prison.

Prison dining room at Great Meadow Correctional Facility in Comstock, NY.

Until the Great Meadows Correctional Facility was built, New York Prisons had been named after the places where they were built. No one knows how Great Meadow got its name, but it may have been named after the huge plot of land that the prison sits on.

Construction began in 1909. The original cell block was more than 1,000 feet (300 m) long and featured 1,168 individual cells. A new administrative building was built in 1932 while the original was remodeled as a hospital. All of the corridors of the prison opened up into one main corridor, called the Rotunda.

The first inmates arrived in February 1911, although the official opening wasn't until June 8, 1911. Not until four years after the opening of the prison was the south wing of the cellblock completed.

Walter N. Thayer was the first warden, but was replaced only a few months later.

In 1925, there were 782 prisoners, 515 of them were under the age of thirty. In 1925, 597 of the inmates at Great Meadow were white, 169 were black and 16 were other. In 1931 there were 1,103 inmates, 726 of whom were under the age of thirty. 847 of the inmates were white, 253 were black, and 3 were other.

Great Meadow was dubbed a correction facility in 1954 when the governor Dewey said, "One of the most pressing needs at the present time is an institution for young offenders in need of rigid discipline." One year was given to the Prisons to clear out the older inmates and make room for the younger incoming inmates. In 1958 construction of a new cell block with 52 beds began and was completed in 1963.

== The Wall ==
When Great Meadow first opened it was home to mostly first time offenders, and therefore it did not need a wall for many years. But as inmate population grew Great Meadows Correctional Facility started receiving second- and third-time offenders from other New York prisons such as Sing Sing and Clinton. Still, without a good wall, many inmates could not be sent to Great Meadow Correctional Facility. In 1924 construction of a 3,000-foot (910 m) wall began. Four years later, the inmates had successfully finished walling themselves in. The wall encloses just over twenty-one acres. With the completion of building this wall Great Meadow became a maximum-security facility.

== Frank Abagnale ==
In his pseudobiography, Catch Me If You Can (book), Frank Abagnale claims to have been on the run for 5 years from 1965 to 1970, working as pediatrician, assistant attorney general, professor and pilot. However, he was incarcerated at Great Meadow between July 26, 1965, and December 24, 1968 effectively eliminating any veracity to his claims of impersonation.

== Major incidents ==
August 17, 1955: 75 inmates armed with bats and clubs refused to move from the yard. The warden gave them five minutes and then authorized the state police to forcefully return them to their cells.

May 1976: A fight broke out between two Muslim groups. They armed themselves with baseball bats and chunks of wood. A warning shot was fired and the guards used tear gas to break the fight up.

August 1976: The inmates, in apparent protest, refused to leave their cells, administrators believe the protest to be due to overcrowding, lack of work for all inmates, and racism. A report on Great Meadow called the facility "the garbage heap of the state prison system." No one was hurt during the demonstration.

May 1981: After an hour-long exercise period, a brawl broke out between inmates and correctional officers. In total 28 people, including two guards, were injured. The brawl broke out at 11 A.M. and with the help of tear gas was brought under control within twenty minutes.

A 38-year-old inmate died in 1982 after an encounter with prison guards. The altercation broke out when the inmate attacked a guard while being escorted back to his cell.

September 2007: Guards used tear gas to break up an inmate quarrel. This was the second time in one week that officers used gas to break up a fight.

== Notable inmates ==
- Richard Angelo - serial killer and poisoner
- James Larkin - Irish Republican and labor leader
- Chanel Lewis - serving a life sentence for murdering Karina Vetrano
- Lucky Luciano - crime boss and gangster transferred as part of Operation Underworld
- Manuel Rivera - serving a life sentence with the possibility of parole after 23 years for the Murder of Lesandro Guzman-Feliz
- Colin Ferguson - mass murderer, serving a de facto life sentence of 385 years and 8 months in prison for the 1993 Long Island Rail Road shooting.
- Nicholas Wiley - serial killer convicted of the murders of three women, confessed to seven.
- Frank Abagnale - Security consultant, convicted felon for notorious frauds.
- Rashaun Weaver - Convicted for 14 years to life in prison for the murder of Tessa Majors, along with his friend Luchiano Lewis. Transferred to Coxsackie Correctional Facility following the prison's closure.
