= Frank Abagnale =

American security consultant and convicted fraudster

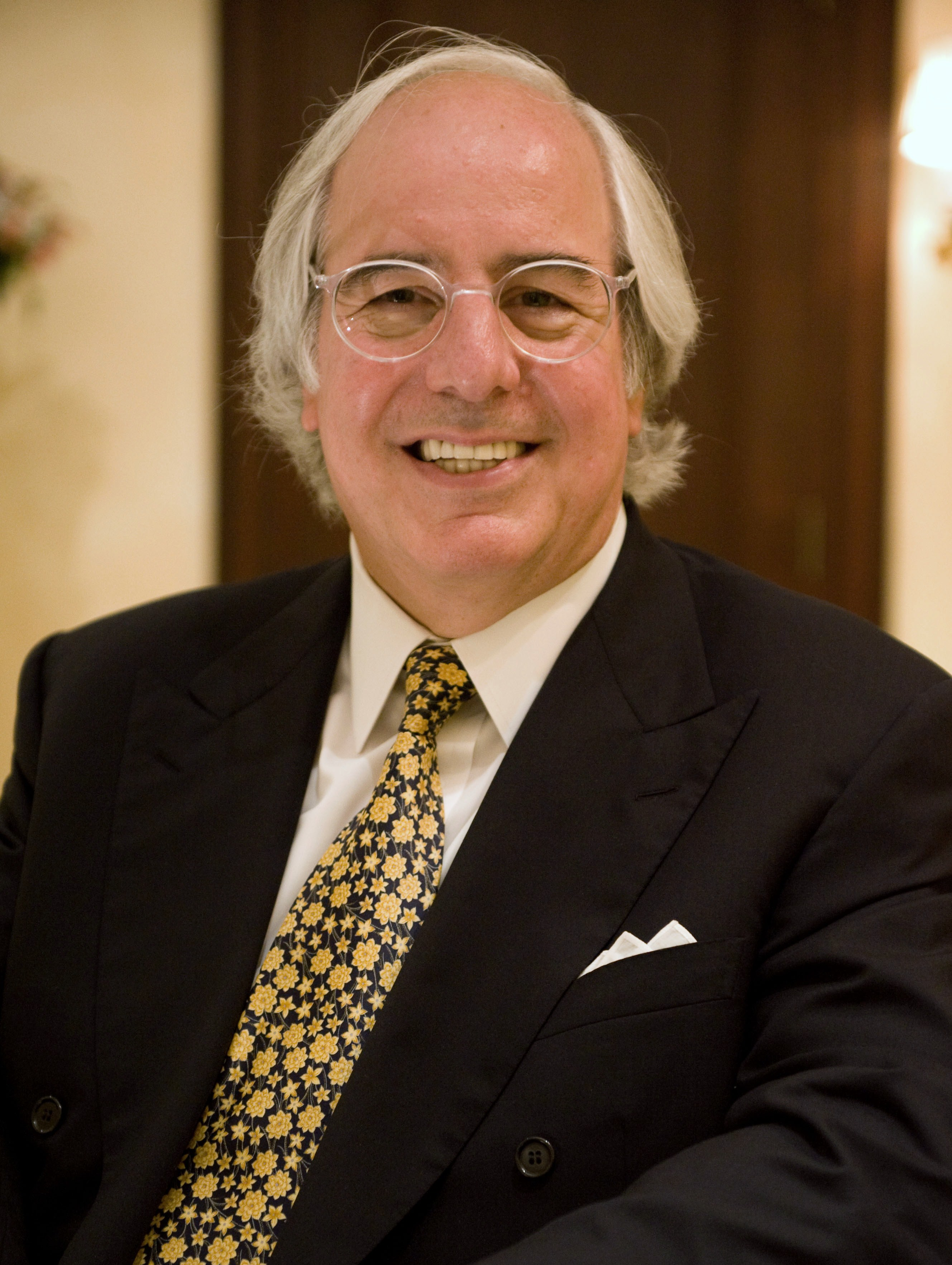
- Abagnale in 2008
- Born: Frank William Abagnale Jr. April 27, 1948 (age 78); New York City, U.S.
- Citizenship: United States, France
- Occupation: Secure document consultant
- Criminal charges: Auto larceny; theft; forgery; fraud
- Criminal penalty: 4 months in a French prison; 2 months in a Swedish prison; 3 years, 3 months, and 7 days in a US federal prison; 3 years in Great Meadow Correctional Facility, US (age 17–20)
- Website: abagnale.com

Frank William Abagnale Jr. (/ˈæbəɡneɪl/; born April 27, 1948) is an American-French con man, convicted felon, author, and security consultant whose documented crimes consist primarily of cheque fraud and petty theft targeting individuals and small businesses. He later became famous for claiming that, while still a teenager, he impersonated a Pan American World Airways pilot, physician, lawyer, and university professor while traveling internationally and passing millions of dollars in fraudulent checks. These claims formed the basis of his 1980 autobiography, Catch Me If You Can, co-written with Stan Redding. The book inspired the film of the same name, directed by Steven Spielberg in 2002, in which Abagnale was portrayed by Leonardo DiCaprio, and later a Broadway musical adaptation.

Journalistic investigations beginning in 1978 found no evidence to support most of Abagnale's biographical claims, and later research found that Abagnale was incarcerated for much of the period during which he claimed to have carried them out. Records do support limited airline impersonation, check fraud, travel in Europe, and imprisonment in France, Sweden, and the United States, but his documented federal Pan Am check case involved ten forged checks totaling less than $1,500. In 2020, author Alan C. Logan published an investigation drawing on public records, prison documents, and newspaper archives that concluded the majority of Abagnale's claimed criminal history was fabricated. Abagnale runs Abagnale and Associates, a consulting firm he founded in 1976.

== Early life ==
Frank William Abagnale Jr. was born in the Bronx, New York City, on April 27, 1948, to a French Pied-noir mother and an Italian-American father. He spent his early years in Bronxville, New York. His parents separated when he was 12 and divorced when he was 15, after which he moved with his father and stepmother to Mount Vernon, New York.

In his autobiography, Abagnale describes his first fraud as charging $3,400 to a gasoline credit card his father had given him. He claims this led to his being sent to a reform school in Westchester County, New York run by Catholic Charities USA. In numerous interviews, he also stated that he attended Iona Preparatory School through the tenth grade; however, his name does not appear in the school's yearbooks from that period and no alumni recall his attending.

In December 1964, Abagnale enlisted in the U.S. Navy at age 16. He was discharged after less than three months, released on February 18, 1965. Less than two weeks later, he was arrested for petty larceny in Mount Vernon. In March 1965, he posed as a police officer and entered the apartment of a Mount Vernon resident, claiming to investigate her daughter. The victim called police, who found Abagnale with a toy gun and a paper badge. He was arrested on a vagrancy charge and ordered the following day to be committed to Grasslands psychiatric institute for observation.

In June 1965, the Federal Bureau of Investigation arrested Abagnale in Eureka, California, for stealing a Ford Mustang from a neighbor of his father. He had financed a cross-country trip with blank checks stolen from a family business on the Bronx River Parkway. On July 7, 1965, Abagnale informed local media that he was a graduate of an American Airlines pilot school in Fort Worth, Texas, but was arrested days later for check theft in Tuckahoe, New York. He was sentenced to three years at Great Meadow Correctional Facility in Comstock, New York. Released after two years into his mother's custody, he violated parole with a stolen-car conviction in Boston and was returned to Great Meadow for a further year.

After his release on December 24, 1968, Abagnale moved to Baton Rouge, Louisiana, where he posed as a TWA pilot and befriended a local minister who introduced him to Louisiana State University faculty. They identified him as a fraud, the minister contacted TWA, which confirmed the deception, and the Baton Rouge Police Department arrested him on February 14, 1969, on vagrancy charges. He was found to have driven a Florida rental car out of state and to possess falsified airline identification. Detectives the following day determined he had also stolen blank checks from his host family and a local business; he was charged with theft and forgery, convicted on June 2, 1969, and sentenced to 12 years of supervised probation. He soon fled to Europe.

== Europe ==
Two weeks after a Louisiana bench warrant was issued, Abagnale was arrested in Montpellier, France, in September 1969, after stealing an automobile and defrauding two families in Klippan, Sweden. He was sentenced to four months for theft in France and served approximately three months in a prison in Perpignan.

He was then extradited to Sweden, where he was convicted of gross fraud by forgery, served two months in a Malmö prison, and was banned from Sweden for eight years. He was deported back to the United States in June 1970 after his appeal failed.

== United States ==
After returning to the United States, Abagnale traveled around college campuses passing bad checks and claiming to recruit stewardesses for Pan Am. At the University of Arizona in 1970, he posed as both a pilot and a physician and conducted physical examinations on female students who believed they were applying to a flight attendant program. University of Arizona officials confirmed that Abagnale had interacted with 12 female students. None were enrolled in any program, and Abagnale was never employed by Pan Am.

On July 30, 1970, Abagnale cashed a personal check made to resemble a Pan Am paycheck in Durham, North Carolina, drawing FBI attention. He was arrested in Cobb County, Georgia, on November 2, 1970, after cashing ten fake Pan Am payroll checks across five states. He escaped from the Cobb County jail and was recaptured four days later in New York City. In 1971, he was sentenced to ten years for forging checks totaling less than $1,500, with an additional two years for the jail escape.

Abagnale was released on parole on February 8, 1974, after serving approximately two years of his sentence at Federal Correctional Institution in Petersburg, Virginia. Later that year, he was arrested again at a children's summer camp in Friendswood, Texas, for stealing cameras from co-workers while posing as a pilot. After receiving a fine, he obtained a position at a Houston-area orphanage by falsely claiming a pilot's credentials and a master's degree. His parole officer discovered the deception and moved him into quarters above his own home. Abagnale subsequently took a position at Aetna, from which he was fired and sued for check fraud.

In 1975, Abagnale approached a bank and offered to educate its staff on the techniques used by check forgers, proposing that if they found his information unhelpful they would owe him nothing, and if useful, they would pay him a modest fee and recommend him to other banks. The arrangement worked, and it became the basis of a new career as a fraud prevention speaker and consultant. In 1976, he founded Abagnale and Associates, which advises corporations, financial institutions, and government agencies on document security and fraud prevention. During this period he also falsified his resume to claim prior work with the Los Angeles Police Department and Scotland Yard.

Over the following decades, Abagnale became a prolific public speaker on fraud and identity theft, commanding fees reported to be between $20,000 and $30,000 per appearance. He has appeared multiple times as a guest on The Tonight Show and made a regular appearance on the British network series The Secret Cabaret in the 1990s. In 2015, AARP named him its Fraud Watch Ambassador, and in 2018, he began co-hosting the AARP podcast The Perfect Scam. He has also appeared on To Tell the Truth and served as an appointed member of various fraud and identity theft advisory bodies.

== Cultural legacy ==
Steven Spielberg directed the film adaptation, Catch Me If You Can, released in December 2002, with Leonardo DiCaprio as Abagnale and Tom Hanks as fictitious FBI agent Carl Hanratty pursuing him. Christopher Walken, who portrayed Abagnale's father, received an Academy Award nomination for Best Supporting Actor. Abagnale appeared in a brief cameo as the French police officer who arrests DiCaprio's character.

A Broadway musical adaptation, Catch Me If You Can, with a book by Terrence McNally and score by Marc Shaiman and Scott Wittman, opened at the Neil Simon Theatre on April 10, 2011, and played 170 regular performances before closing on September 4, 2011. The production starred Aaron Tveit as Abagnale and Norbert Leo Butz as the FBI agent pursuing him. It received four Tony Award nominations, including Best Musical; Butz won Best Actor in a Musical.

== Veracity of claims ==
Beginning in the late 1970s, Abagnale claimed in public lectures and interviews that between the ages of 16 and 21 he had impersonated a Pan American pilot, a Georgia hospital physician, a Louisiana assistant attorney general, and a sociology professor, while evading a sustained FBI manhunt across 26 countries and cashing more than $2.5 million in fraudulent checks. Journalists who investigated these claims beginning in 1978 found them to be largely or entirely unsupported. Individuals whom Abagnale had criminally targeted described the lasting effects of his actual, documented offenses:

He had a key to our front door, it was never recovered. We changed the lock. I fed him. I cooked. I don't trust people as much anymore.

— Charlette Parks, Abagnale victim interviewed April 27, 1981, The Advocate

=== The Louisiana attorney general claim ===
Abagnale claimed that he passed the Louisiana bar examination, worked for Attorney General Jack P. F. Gremillion, and closed 33 cases. These claims were challenged by journalists as early as 1978. No record has been found of Abagnale ever being a member of the Louisiana Bar. In 1978, the Louisiana State Bar Association reviewed all bar exam records and concluded Abagnale had never taken the exam under his name or any alias; the state attorney general's office examined payroll records for the period Abagnale claimed to have worked there and found no trace of him. First Assistant Attorney General Kenneth C. DeJean, after testing Abagnale's claimed familiarity with the office, was direct in his assessment:

The man is not an imposter, he is a liar.

— Kenneth C. DeJean, First Assistant Attorney General, 'The Great Imposter', April 24, 1981, The Advocate

=== The Georgia pediatrician claim ===
Abagnale claimed to have worked for a year as a supervising pediatrician at Cobb General Hospital in Marietta, Georgia, overseeing seven residents and 42 nurses on a midnight-to-8 am shift. Hospital administrators told journalist Ira Perry that no such overnight pediatrician shift existed at the hospital during the period in question. Author Alan C. Logan later demonstrated, using New York State Archives records, that Abagnale was incarcerated at Great Meadow Prison at the age of 18, the same age at which he claimed to have worked at Cobb General.

Abagnale's impersonation of a doctor is not entirely without basis. In 1970, at the University of Arizona, he told students he was a physician and conducted physical examinations on female students under the pretense of a Pan Am recruitment program. University officials confirmed the interactions with 12 students. In 2021, Louisiana State University journalism professor Robert Mann expressed regret that he had not challenged Abagnale's account of this episode when he covered a campus lecture: "Reading those words now, in which Abagnale bragged about sexual abuse, makes me sick."

=== The BYU professor claim ===
In public lectures, Abagnale claimed to have taught sociology for two semesters at Brigham Young University (BYU) using a falsified doctorate. In 2006, KSL-TV journalist Scott Haws challenged Abagnale on this claim, presenting his own published words as evidence. Abagnale initially said he could not recall the details and attributed the claim to his co-author Stan Redding. Haws then showed him that the claim appeared in materials Abagnale himself had authored, including the film's closing credits. Abagnale ultimately conceded he may have been a guest lecturer. BYU spokepeople have insisted there is no record of Abagnale or any of his aliases having been on the faculty or staff there, something that would exist for even a guest lecturer.

=== Claims regarding the FBI ===
In the years following the release of Catch Me If You Can, Abagnale increasingly claimed a long and formal relationship with the FBI. He told audiences he had been placed on the FBI Ten Most Wanted Fugitives list as a teenager, that he was granted a special parole in 1974 or 1975 to conduct undercover work for the Bureau, that he received assignments directly from Director Clarence M. Kelley, and that he worked as an ethics instructor at the FBI Academy in Quantico, Virginia. By 2014, he was publicly stating that he was celebrating 38 years at the FBI.

Journalist Ira Perry found in 1978 that Abagnale and his publicist were directing inquiries to a retired FBI official, Robert Russ Franck, whom they described as a former Atlanta agent familiar with Abagnale's case. Franck, who had in fact retired as head of the FBI's Houston Division and had never worked in Atlanta, told Perry he had never met Abagnale and could not verify any of his claims. Eugene Stewart, a retired FBI agent who had led the Atlanta division during the period Abagnale claimed to have been a pediatrician there, described Abagnale to Perry as a low-level criminal.

Pressed when Catch Me If You Can was released, Abagnale acknowledged on his company's website that he had never been on the FBI's Most Wanted list. Retired FBI agent Jerri Williams, a white-collar crime specialist, rejected his claims of receiving assignments directly from Director Kelley: "If anybody tells you that they got an assignment directly from the FBI director, right from the head of the FBI, you know for a fact it's bullshit. It doesn't happen that way." When the film was released, an FBI spokesperson confirmed that Abagnale had given lectures at the academy "from time to time," but denied that the bureau had given him commendations as claimed in the film's marketing. In September 2022, retired FBI agent Alan Brown confirmed to journalist Javier Leiva that Abagnale's 1970 arrest in Marietta, Georgia, was a routine response to a teletype request; Abagnale was found in his hotel room without incident, contrary to the dramatic escape depicted in the film.

=== Logan and Leiva investigations ===
In 2020, author Alan C. Logan published The Greatest Hoax on Earth, an investigation into Abagnale's claimed criminal history drawing on prison records, administrative documents, and newspaper archives. Logan demonstrated using New York State Archives records that Abagnale was incarcerated at Great Meadow Prison as inmate #25367 from July 26, 1965, to December 24, 1968, the precise period during which Abagnale claimed to have committed his most celebrated frauds. Logan's research also documented numerous petty crimes Abagnale had never publicly acknowledged. Abagnale declined to address the book's specific findings, calling it "not worthy of a comment."

In 2022, investigative journalist Javier Leiva independently verified Logan's findings, confirmed federal court records showing Abagnale's Pan Am check conviction involved less than $1,500, and calculated that Abagnale was free for only a matter of months between 1965 and 1970. On June 23, 2022, Leiva confronted Abagnale at the Connect IT Global conference in Las Vegas with prison and court records in hand.

In August 2022, Google disabled comments on Abagnale's "Talks at Google" video and added a disclaimer stating that Google did not endorse or vouch for the content, noting the video was being retained for historical purposes.

On September 12, 2022, Xavier University in Cincinnati presented Abagnale with a "Heroes in Ethics" award. At the conclusion of his lecture, an audience member asked Abagnale whether he would acknowledge that his stories were fabricated. Abagnale denied telling any lies and stated he had no responsibility for the content of his autobiography, the film, or the Broadway musical. Xavier University subsequently removed all online reference to the event.

In a 2002 interview with USA Today, Abagnale acknowledged that the long-term impersonations in his autobiography were exaggerated: "I impersonated a doctor for a few days, I was a lawyer for a few days. In the book, it's like I am doing this for a year." Despite this concession, he continued to make the long-term impersonation claims in subsequent public appearances. Abagnale's speaking fee has been reported to be between $20,000 and $30,000.

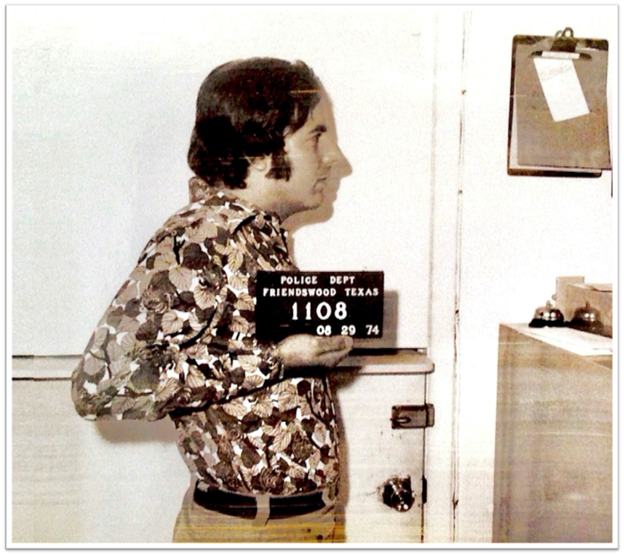
Friendswood, Texas arrest photo, 1974

== Personal life ==
Abagnale and his wife, Kelly, live on Daniel Island, part of Charleston, South Carolina. They have three sons. Abagnale has stated that meeting Kelly was the motivation for changing his life.

== Books ==
- Abagnale, Frank W.; Redding, Stan; Jr, Frank W. Abagnale (2000) [1980]. Catch Me If You Can: The Amazing True Story of the Youngest and Most Daring Con Man in the History of Fun and Profit!. Roberto de Vicq de Cumptich, Telegraph Colour Library/FPG, Keith MacLeod. New York, USA: Broadway Books. ISBN 978-0-7679-0538-1.
- Abagnale, Frank W.; Whitener, Barrett (October 9, 2001). The Art of the Steal: How to Recognize and Prevent Fraud—America's #1 Crime. Broadway books. ISBN 978-0-7679-0683-8. OCLC 46917966.
- Abagnale, Frank W. (2004). Real U guide to identity theft. Johanna Bodnyk. Loganville, GA: Real U, Inc. ISBN 978-1-932999-01-3. OCLC 56796011.
- Abagnale, Frank W. (April 24, 2007). Stealing Your Life: The Ultimate Identity Theft Prevention Plan. Random House/Broadway. ISBN 978-0-7679-2586-0. OCLC 68711918.
- Abagnale, Frank (2019). Scam Me If You Can: Simple Strategies to Outsmart Today's Rip-Off Artists. Portfolio/Penguin. ISBN 978-0-525-53896-7.
- Logan, Alan C.; Parks, Paula; Zinder, Mark (January 10, 2021) [2020]. The Greatest Hoax on Earth: Catching Truth, While We Can. Alan Logan. ISBN 978-1-7361974-1-7.

== See also ==
- The Great Impostor, 1961 film about Ferdinand Waldo Demara
- Elliot Castro, Scottish former fraudster
- William Douglas Street Jr., American con artist
