= Ericka Hunter =

Canadian actress and singer

Ericka Hunter Yang
- Born: Ericka Yang; May 8, 1982 (age 44); Ottawa, Ontario, Canada
- Occupations: Singer; actress; dancer
- Years active: 2000–present
- Spouse: Aaron Tveit (m. 2025)
- Children: 1

Ericka Hunter Yang (born May 8, 1982) is a Canadian-born singer, songwriter, dancer and actress. Hunter began her career as a Radio City Music Hall Rockette and made her Broadway debut in 2002. She has since been part of the original Broadway ensemble casts of Rock of Ages (later starring as Sherrie), American Psycho, Doctor Zhivago, the 2017 revival of Miss Saigon, and Moulin Rouge!

== Early life ==
Yang was born in Ottawa, Ontario, to a Canadian mother and Chinese-born Hong Konger father. She grew up in the city's suburb of Nepean and attended a public performing arts high school. She has an older sister, Vanessa, and younger brother, Warren Yang, a former gymnast and actor. Hunter is of Chinese, Dutch, German, and English descent.

== Career ==
After studying dance and theater in her hometown of Ottawa, Ontario, she made her professional debut with Radio City Rockettes at 18. Ericka then joined the Toronto company of The Lion King before being cast as a featured dancer in the ABC/Disney movie The Music Man. In 2002, at the age of 20, she made her Broadway debut in the original revival cast of Flower Drum Song and then went on to perform in the Broadway cast of 42nd Street.

In 2006, she relocated to Los Angeles to develop a music and fashion career. She worked as an assistant to stylist Joe Zee performed alongside artists such as Rihanna, Shakira, and Justin Timberlake. During this period, she began using the professional name Ericka Hunter, taking the last name from a maternal great-grandmother.

In 2008, she returned to New York. She joined the cast of the Broadway musical Rock of Ages in 2009. She later performed in Doctor Zhivago, the musical thriller American Psycho, Rock Of Ages (where she played the lead role of Sherrie), as well as the revival of Miss Saigon (understudied/performed the roles of Gigi and Ellen).

Early in 2018, she performed in the Danny Strong newly scripted version of Chess at the Kennedy Center. In addition to her Broadway credits, she's been cast in multiple TV productions including Mozart In The Jungle (Amazon), Smash (NBC), Modern Love (Amazon), and Katy Keene (CW). In 2021, she was a Core Dancer on Schmigadoon!, released on Apple TV+.

Hunter is featured on French DJ Morgan Nagoya's dance single "Promised Land" along with Jonny Rose and Chris Reeder. She released her first U.S. solo single "Fight to Believe" on January 17, 2013.

== Personal life ==
Hunter is married to actor Aaron Tveit. Tveit confirmed in December 2024 that the two welcomed their first child, a daughter, in November. Hunter and Tveit shared on social media in August 2026 that they are expecting another child.

== Theatre ==
Year	Production	Role	Venue	Notes
2000	The Lion King	Ensemble	The Princess of Wales Theatre	Toronto production
2001	Radio City Christmas Spectacular	Rockette	Radio City Music Hall	
2002–03	Flower Drum Song	Ensemble	The August Wilson Theatre: October 2002 – March 2003	Original Broadway production Credited as: Ericka Yang
2003–04	42nd Street	Ensemble	Ford Center for the Performing Arts	Broadway replacement Credited as: Ericka Yang
2003–04	42nd Street	Ethel	Ford Center for the Performing Arts	Broadway replacement Credited as: Ericka Yang
2004	Princesses		Goodspeed Theater	Regional developmental production
2005	Aida	Ensemble	Ogunquit Playhouse	Regional production
2007	Damn Yankees	Ensemble	Freud Playhouse at UCLA: November 2007	Reprise Theatre Company
2009–15	Rock of Ages	Ensemble, Swing (u/s Sherrie, Regina)	Brooks Atkinson Theatre: March 2009 – March 2013	Original Broadway production
2009–15	Rock of Ages	Ensemble (u/s Sherrie, Justice, Regina)	Brooks Atkinson Theatre: November 2014 – January 2015	Broadway replacement
2014	The Band Wagon	Isabelle	New York City Center Stage II: November 2014	Concert staging
2015	Doctor Zhivago	Ensemble	Broadway Theatre: March – May 2015	Original Broadway production
2016	American Psycho	Sabrina / Video Store Clerk (u/s Evelyn Williams, Courtney Lawrence, Svetlana, Mrs. Bateman, Mrs. Wolfe)	Gerald Schoenfeld Theatre: March – June 2016	Original Broadway production
2017	Miss Saigon	Ensemble (u/s Gigi, Ellen)	Broadway Theatre: March – October 2017	Broadway revival
2018	Chess	Ensemble	JFK Center for the Performing Arts: February 2018	Concert staging
2018–2022	Moulin Rouge!	Ensemble (u/s Arabia, La Chocolat)	Emerson Colonial Theatre: July – August 2018	Original Boston production (Pre-Broadway tryout)
2018–2022	Moulin Rouge!	Ensemble (u/s Arabia, La Chocolat)	Al Hirschfeld Theatre: June 2019 – April 2022	Original Broadway production
2023	Some Like It Hot	Swing	Shubert Theatre: March – April 2023; June 2023	

== Filmography ==
Year	Title	Role	Notes
2003	The Music Man	Dancer	Film
2004–2011	Rescue Me	Singing Nurse	Episode: "Disease"
2012–2013	Smash	Dancer	2 episodes
2014	It Could Be Worse	Lacy	Episode: "Fate"
2014	Mozart In The Jungle	Dancer	Episode: "Pilot"
2019	Modern Love		
2020	Katy Keene		Episode: "Chapter One"
2020	Broadway Profiles with Tamsen Fadal	Self	Episode on Oct 2020
2021–2023	Schmigadoon!	Core Dancer, Tribal Dancer, Cabaret Girl Molly	9 episodes
2022	Better Nate Than Ever	Dancer	Film
