= Nicholas Wiley =

American serial killer (born 1962)

- Born: Nicholas Lee Wiley; July 17, 1962 (age 64); Syracuse, New York, U.S.
- Other name: "The Syracuse Serial Killer"
- Conviction: First degree murder (3 counts)
- Penalty: Life imprisonment without parole

Details
- Victims: 3–7
- Span of crimes: April – May 31, 2004
- Country: United States
- State: New York
- Date apprehended: June 2, 2004

Nicholas Lee Wiley (born July 17, 1962), known as The Syracuse Serial Killer, is an American serial killer and sex offender who murdered at least three women in Syracuse, New York in 2004. He claimed to have killed a total of seven people, although his claims were never corroborated. For his known crimes, he was sentenced to life imprisonment without the possibility of parole.

== Early life ==
Wiley was born in Syracuse on July 17, 1962. He had a criminal history dating back to 1979. In 1983, he was accused of striking 66 year old Doris Lando repeatedly with a hammer, cutting her telephone lines, and robbing her of items and cash. Wiley's lawyer defended his case by presenting the notion that Wiley "was denied effective assistance of counsel." Wiley was given a sentence reduction and was released sometime before 1990. In 1991, Wiley was sentenced to twelve years in prison for sexually assaulting and beating a 16-year-old girl. He was released from prison on January 22, 2004, and registered as a level 3 sex offender.

== Confirmed victims ==
On April 11, 2004, only a few months after Wiley's release from prison, 18-year-old Tammy Passineau, a 5'3" single mother, disappeared in Syracuse. She was last seen with a friend in the 100 block of west Water Street. Although an investigation was conducted, police were unable to locate her whereabouts, and foul play became a suspected factor. Passineau was a known drifter, so she was not immediately reported missing until the following month when her family reported her missing to authorities. Authorities theorized that Wiley was responsible for Passineau's disappearance after he had been arrested.

On May 31, 2004, 31-year-old Lottie Thompson, a mother of three, was found stabbed to death in her apartment in Syracuse. She lived in the same West Onondaga Street building where Wiley was living at the time. The next day, on June 1, the body of 22-year-old Hannah Finnerty was discovered inside a trash can outside of the building, the cause of death was due to numerous stab wounds.

== Arrest ==
The next day, after Finnerty's body was found, Wiley was arrested as a suspect. After his arrest, Wiley confessed to the a total of seven murders between April and May. He claimed he had murdered four women, two men, and a teenage gang member. His claims were investigated, but no evidence could be found to support his statement, and authorities discounted his confessions.

However, authorities theorized that Wiley was responsible for Tammy Passineau's disappearance; one lead that detectives suspected was that Wiley described killing a red-haired girl named Tammy in April and, when looking at older cases, it matched with a description of Passineau. Officials turned their focus on Wiley's apartment and searched through it, and found a boxcutter which contained blood that was later matched to Passineau's DNA, and he was indicted for her murder in December. Passineau's remains are still yet to be found besides the blood in Nicholas Wiley's apartment.

== Trial and imprisonment ==
In the killing of Passineau, Wiley said he had become enraged after a conversation about sexual predators and prison, which caused him to snap and slash Passineau's throat. He also claimed that he had killed Thompson in a fit of anger while having sex in her apartment, which resulted in him slitting her throat. Wiley stated that he killed his final victim, Finnerty, after he had become upset after she bargained with him for more crack cocaine. Wiley ended his confession by stated he felt like a ninja during his murders.

During the trial, Wiley's defense attempted to sway the jury that Wiley, a mentally sick and twisted individual, was coerced to confess. The defense also tried to drop a first-degree murder charge due to the killings not fitting the profile, but the judge pointed out a 1995 ruling which had met the term. The six men and six women jury found Wiley guilty of three counts of first degree murder and three counts of second degree murder. Days later, he was sentenced to life imprisonment. Wiley attempted to appeal his sentences in 2009, but the convictions were all upheld.

== See also ==
- List of serial killers in the United States
