= Created Equal (film) =

- Directed by: Bill Duke
- Screenplay by: Ned Bowman; Joyce Renee Lewis; Michael Ricigliano Jr. Thada Catalon
- Produced by: Thada Catalon
- Starring: Lou Diamond Phillips; Aaron Tveit; Edy Ganem
- Cinematography: Steven Parker
- Edited by: Cari Coughlin
- Music by: Kurt Farquhar
- Production companies: Created Equal Productions; T-CAT Films
- Distributed by: Vision Films
- Release date: June 15, 2017 (ABFF)
- Running time: 91 minutes
- Country: United States
- Language: English
- Budget: $1.6 million

Created Equal is a 2017 legal drama film directed by Bill Duke. It was shown at several festivals in 2017 before being released in the United States on January 16, 2018.

== Plot ==
A woman attempting to become a priest solicits the help of a young attorney to sue the Archdiocese of New Orleans for sex discrimination.

== Cast ==
- Lou Diamond Phillips as Monsignor Renzulli
- Aaron Tveit as Tommy Reilly
- Gregory Alan Williams as Judge Watford
- Edy Ganem as Alejandra Batista

== Production ==
Production began in 2016.

== Release ==
The film premiered at the American Black Film Festival at 4:00 p.m. on June 15, 2017, before being released in the United States on January 16, 2018.
