= Catch Me If You Can (musical) =

2009 American musical drama

- Official logo
- Music: Marc Shaiman
- Lyrics: Marc Shaiman; Scott Wittman
- Book: Terrence McNally
- Basis: Catch Me If You Can by Jeff Nathanson; Catch Me If You Can by Frank Abagnale Jr. Stan Redding
- Premiere: April 10, 2011: Neil Simon Theatre
- Productions: 2009 Seattle; 2011 Broadway; 2012 Non-Equity tour

Catch Me If You Can is a musical drama with a libretto by Terrence McNally and a theatrical score by Marc Shaiman and Scott Wittman. It follows the story of a con artist named Frank Abagnale. A majority of the plot is borrowed from the 2002 film of the same name, which in turn was based on the 1980 autobiography of the same name by Abagnale and Stan Redding.

After a tryout musical performance in Seattle in 2009, Catch Me If You Can opened at Broadway's Neil Simon Theatre in April 2011. The production received four Tony Awards nominations, including one for Best Musical, winning Best Actor in a Musical for Norbert Leo Butz.

== Productions ==
=== Readings and workshops (2005–2008) ===
The musical had a reading in 2005, directed by Jack O'Brien, with Nathan Lane, Tom Wopat, Brandon Wardell and Matthew Morrison. In private workshops held in July 2007, O'Brien was director, with Nathan Lane, Christian Borle, Angie Schworer, Tom Wopat and Brandon Wardell. Other actors involved in the readings included Aaron Tveit and Norbert Leo Butz, Celia Keenan-Bolger, Sara Gettelfinger, Katharine McPhee, Felicia Finley, Autumn Hurlbert, Lauren Ashley Zakrin and Annaleigh Ashford.

=== Seattle tryout (2009) ===
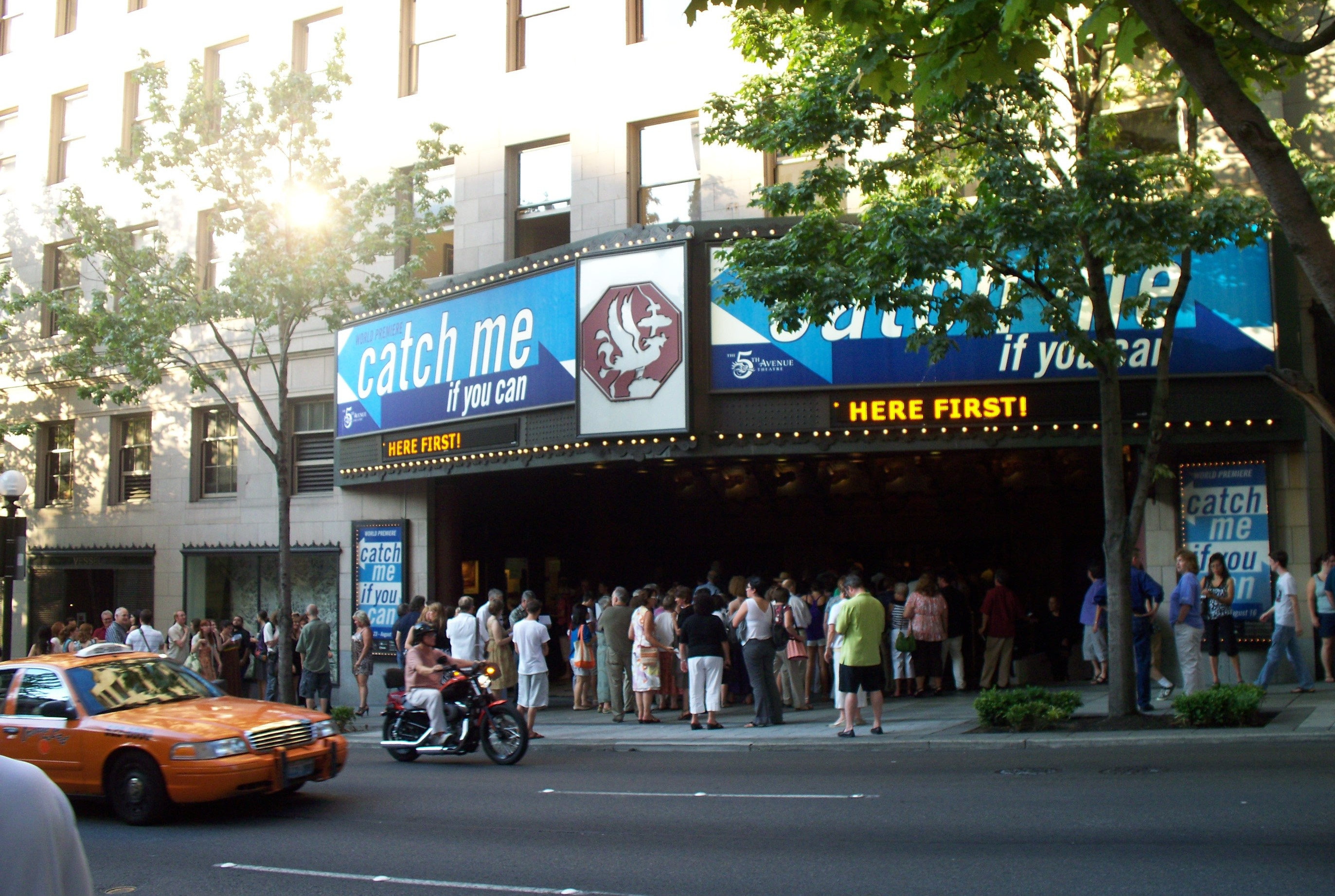
Catch Me If You Can at the 5th Avenue Theatre in Seattle, Washington.

The musical was originally scheduled to premiere on July 25, 2009, at the 5th Avenue Theatre in Seattle, with Jack O'Brien as director and choreography by Jerry Mitchell. The 5th Avenue Theatre previously held the world premiere of the creative team's hit musical Hairspray. The first few days of previews of the show were cancelled due to a tragedy in Norbert Leo Butz's family (Butz played Carl Hanratty). The musical premiered on July 28, 2009, and ended August 16, 2009.

In addition to Butz, the cast included Aaron Tveit as Frank, Tom Wopat as Frank Sr., Kerry Butler as Brenda, Linda Hart as Carol, and Nick Wyman as Roger.

The production received mostly positive reviews from critics.

=== Broadway (2011) ===
On March 11, 2011, the musical began preview performances on Broadway at the Neil Simon Theatre, with an official opening date on April 10, 2011. The show featured most of the Seattle cast, with Butz, Tveit, Wopat, and Butler appearing in leading roles. Other Seattle cast members included: Linda Hart, Nick Wyman, Rachel deBenedet, Brandon Wardell, Timothy McCuen Piggee, and Angie Schworer. The production had scenic design by David Rockwell, costume design by William Ivey Long, lighting design by Kenneth Posner, and musical direction by John McDaniel; O'Brien and Mitchell were the director and choreographer, respectively.

The production closed September 4, 2011, after 32 previews and 170 regular performances.

=== US tour (2012–13) ===
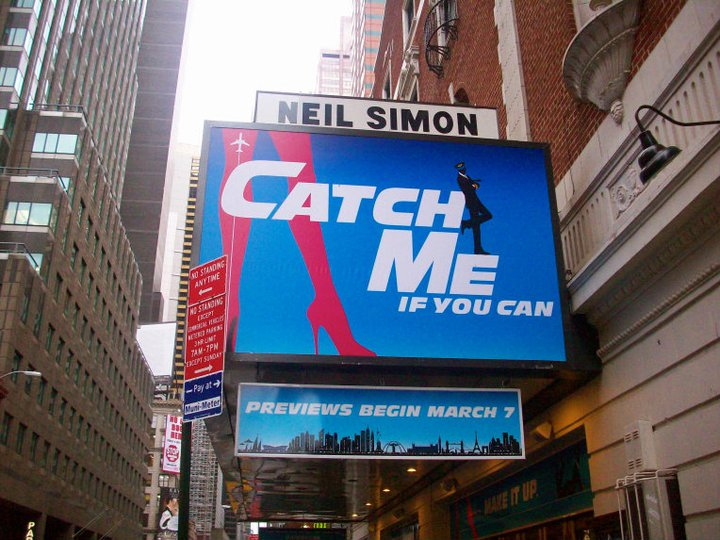
Catch Me If You Can on Broadway at the Neil Simon Theatre.

A United States national tour, presented by Troika Entertainment, began performances October 7, 2012, in Providence, Rhode Island. The tour was contracted through July 28, 2013. The production features Stephen Anthony as Frank Abagnale Jr. and Merritt David Janes as Agent Carl Hanratty.

== Synopsis ==
=== Act I ===
In the 1960s, Frank Abagnale Jr., a young con man, is cornered at the Miami International Airport by FBI Agent Carl Hanratty and his team. Hanratty asserts that there's no use in running, as his men are trained to shoot. Before his arrest, Frank pleads with Hanratty to allow him to inform the people in the airport why they're beating at him, though Hanratty only wants to know how he passed the bar exam in New Orleans to pose as a lawyer. Frank promises to tell him all his secrets if they allow him to tell his story ("Live in Living Color"). A reluctant Hanratty agrees.

In a home in New Rochelle, New York, Frank lives with his parents Frank Abagnale Sr. and Paula Abagnale. His parents met in Montrichard, France, during World War II. Paula was performing at a diner and noticed Frank Sr. among the soldiers in the audience ("The Pinstripes Are All That They See"), marrying him soon after. Due to money shortages, Frank is unable to attend private school, nonetheless wearing his school jacket to public school. He is taunted there as looking like a substitute teacher, which gives Frank an idea; a few days later, the principal informs his parents that Frank has been teaching French class at the school while their teacher is absent.

One day, Frank walks home from school to find his mother dancing with one of Frank Sr.'s friends. She pleads with him not to tell Frank Sr., but a distraught Frank is soon in court, with Paula and Frank Sr. fighting over custody of him. Frank decides to run away ("Someone Else's Skin"). He soon learns to create fake checks, cashing them at banks across the country and successfully conning millions of dollars.

While entering a New York City hotel, Frank notices several attractive women, all of them stewardesses; he decides to become a pilot. After creating a fake ID card, he finds a co-pilot job at Pan American World Airways. The workers express the joys of a life in the skies ("Jet Set"). Hanratty finds several fake checks on his desk in Washington, D. C. He and Agents Branton, Dollar, and Cod are assigned to track down the writer of these fake checks ("Live in Living Color [Reprise]"). Hanratty gives a word of wisdom to whoever wrote the checks: "Don't Break the Rules."

Frank enjoys his pilot job, remembering how his dad always said that "women love a man in uniform," as "The Pinstripes Are All That They See." Feeling homesick, he visits Frank Sr., upset to find out that he had to close his store to save money. Frank offers him several checks to improve his financial situation, but Frank Sr. declines, believing that Frank should be happy with his success and not worry about him ("Butter Outta Cream"). Meanwhile, Hanratty sorts through leftover items from the hotel Frank had just stayed at, looking for ("The Man Inside the Clues.") Hanratty tracks Frank to a hotel room in Los Angeles, but Frank escapes after tricking Hanratty into believing that Frank is a Secret Service agent named Barry Allen.

Frank attends a holiday party for the airport staff ("Christmas Is My Favorite Time of Year") but ultimately feels lonely, calling Hanratty on a pay phone for comfort. Hanratty, realizing the culprit is just a kid, reveals that he, too, has no one to spend Christmas with ("My Favorite Time of Year").

=== Act II ===
Frank comes across another staff party, this time for a hospital. When asked what his job is by one of the doctors, Frank lies that he is a pediatrician at the Death Valley Children's Hospital, working with "snot-nosed kids" and calling himself "Dr. Connors." Feeling sorry for him, the doctor finds him a job at the Atlanta General Hospital, surrounded by nurses who are ready to take the ("Doctor's Orders").

Hanratty is still searching for Frank, going through missing person reports ("Live in Living Color (reprise)"). He eventually finds the house of Paula and her new husband, questioning her on the whereabouts of Frank. She tells him not to worry, as does Frank Sr. Both plead with Frank: ("Don't Be a Stranger"). While talking to Frank Sr. at a bar, Hanratty realizes that both men had overbearing fathers ("Little Boy Be a Man").

Meanwhile, Frank has fallen in love with one of the nurses, Brenda Strong, though she finds him intimidating. He tells her he has seen the "Seven Wonders," but none of them compare to her beauty. Brenda brings Frank to meet her family in New Orleans, where he lies that he's a lawyer, a doctor, and a Lutheran to impress her father. Her father does not believe him but permits him to be with Brenda after Frank admits how much he loves her. Brenda's parents, Carol and Roger Strong, tell Frank that they have a "family sing-along" each night after dinner; they turn on the television to the song "((Our) Family Tree"), after which Frank proposes to Brenda, and she accepts.

Shortly before the engagement ceremony, Frank discovers Hanratty has figured out where he is. He admits the truth to Brenda, telling her his real name: Frank William Abagnale Jr. He promises to return after escaping from Hanratty. Just as he leaves, Hanratty enters, asking Brenda where Frank went. She laments that she loves Frank and would never tell on him ("Fly, Fly Away") but is tricked into doing so shortly thereafter.

The story returns to the opening scene, where Frank is cornered in the airport. The agents escort passengers out of the area as Frank threatens to run. Hanratty states that he doesn't want to use force but would have to if Frank ran. Hanratty informs Frank that his father is dead; a drunken Frank Sr. had fallen downstairs at the bar, breaking his neck. Realizing he has nobody, Frank gives in to Hanratty ("Goodbye").

Although sentenced to fifteen years in prison, Frank is released after seven. Shortly after his release, he is hired by Hanratty and the FBI to track down others who committed crimes like his. Hanratty and Frank embrace, noting that their partnership is "Strange But True." Hanratty then makes Frank keep his promise, telling him how he passed the New Orleans bar exam. Frank tells a surprised Hanratty that he didn't cheat: "I studied."

== Musical numbers ==
Act I

- "Live in Living Color" – Frank Jr. and Ensemble
- "The Pinstripes Are All That They See" – Frank Sr., Frank Jr, and Ladies
- "Someone Else's Skin" – Frank Jr. and Ensemble
- "Jet Set" - Stewardesses, Pilots, and Frank Jr.
- "Live in Living Color (Reprise)"† - Frank Jr.
- "Don't Break the Rules" – Hanratty and Agents
- "The Pinstripes Are All That They See (Reprise)"† – The Ladies
- "Butter Outta Cream" – Frank Jr. and Frank Sr.
- "The Man Inside the Clues" – Hanratty
- "Christmas Is My Favorite Time of Year"†††† - Partygoers
- "My Favorite Time of Year"††† – Hanratty, Frank Jr., Frank Sr., and Paula

Act II

- "Doctor's Orders" – Nurse and Nurses
- "Live in Living Color (Reprise)"† - Frank Jr.
- "Don't Be a Stranger" – Paula and Frank Sr.
- "Little Boy, Be a Man" – Frank Sr. and Hanratty
- "Hanratty's Reprise" † – Hanratty
- "Seven Wonders" – Frank Jr. and Brenda
- "(Our) Family Tree" – Carol, Roger, Brenda, Frank Jr., and Strong Family Singers
- "Fly, Fly Away" – Brenda
- "Goodbye" – Frank Jr.
- "Strange But True"†† – Hanratty, Frank Jr., and Ensemble

†Not on Broadway cast album.
††Titled "Stuck Together (Strange But True)" on cast album.
†††Titled "Christmas Is My Favorite Time of Year" on cast album.
††††Released in full on the 2011 Broadway Cares benefit album "Broadway's Greatest Gifts: Carols For a Cure 13".

- "Fifty Checks"- Frank Sr. is a cut song featured on the Original Broadway Cast Album

== Original casts ==
Character	Seattle	Broadway	US tour	Japan	Australia	Poland
Character	2009	2011	2012	2015	2016	2023
Frank Abagnale Jr.	Aaron Tveit	Aaron Tveit	Stephen Anthony	Yuzuru Kurenai	Thomas Bradford	Karol Drozd / Marcin Franc / Maciej Marcin Tomaszewski
Carl Hanratty	Norbert Leo Butz	Norbert Leo Butz	Merritt David Janes	Hiroki Nanami	Stuart Dodge	Krzysztof Cybiński / Jarosław Oberbek
Frank Abagnale Sr.	Tom Wopat	Tom Wopat	Dominic Fortuna	You Natsumi	Richard Perdriau	Paweł Erdman / Janusz Kruciński
Paula Abagnale	Rachel de Benedet	Rachel de Benedet	Caitlin Maloney	Anru Yumeki	Bianca Giorgetti	Anna Gigiel / Emilia Klimczak
Brenda Strong	Kerry Butler	Kerry Butler	Aubrey Mae Davis	Airi Kisaki	Rachel Rai	Anna Federowicz / Joanna Gorzała
Carol Strong	Linda Hart	Linda Hart	Amy Burgmaier	Yui Marino	Serenity Harbour	Agnieszka Gabrysiak / Aleksandra Janiszewska
Roger Strong	Nick Wyman	Nick Wyman	D. Scott Withers	Rin Yuuma	Stephen McMahon	Piotr Płuska / Andrzej Orechwo
FBI Agent Johnny Dollar	Brandon Wardell	Brandon Wardell	Ben Laxton	Yuria Seo	James Robertson	Michał Domagała / Natan Nogaj

== Reception ==
The Broadway production received mixed reviews. The most positive review came from Michael Giltz of the Huffington Post: "Catch Me If You Can is a sheer delight from the poignant and brilliant book by Terrence McNally to the sexy but character-driven choreography by Jerry Mitchell to the perfect sets by David Rockwell to the spot-on costumes by William Ivey Long to Kenneth Posner's marvelous lighting. It's all tied together by the superlative direction of Jack O'Brien which is seamless in weaving together drama, comedy, dance, acting, genuine scenes of pathos and casual banter with the audience and orchestra."

Ben Brantley of The New York Times wrote, "With 'Hairspray' Mr. Shaiman and Mr. Wittman lucratively mined another vein of the 1960s – Motown-style pop – so taking on 'Catch Me' seemed a natural. But this time they're doing pastiches of music from television variety shows – of both the Mitch Miller and Dean Martin kinds – a form that is dangerously close to lounge and elevator music. The flashy musical numbers definitely emerge from the plot, just as they are supposed to do in your basic organic musical, but they sometimes have the chalky flavor of audio-visual aids."

Thorm Geier of Entertainment Weekly gave the show a "B−" and said, "Part of the problem with Catch Me If You Can is Terrence McNally's book, which is oddly paced and curiously structured. When Abagnale is arrested by the feds in the opening scene, he takes the opportunity to tell his own story from the beginning in the style of a '60s TV show. Why a TV show and not a Broadway play? I have no idea. Perhaps composer Marc Shaiman is just accustomed to the idiom since '60s TV factored so largely in his Tony-winning hit Hairspray. Shaiman has also conceived the music as a pastiche of early '60s musical styles, all of them curiously pre-rock. Unfortunately, this makes the score seem even more old-fashioned than some of the musicals genuinely from that era (like the current hit revival How to Succeed in Business Without Really Trying). Under the direction of Jack O'Brien, though, Catch Me If You Can moves mostly in fits and starts. But the creators of Catch Me If You Can have rigged the game against them. What should have been a fun lark of a story seems almost stodgy, like your grandmother's idea of a good time."

In Steven Suskin's review of the show in Variety, he wrote, "Tuner has fine credentials, with the lead producer, songwriters, director, choreographer, designers and two featured actresses from the 2002 megahit "Hairspray" returning to the Neil Simon. "Catch" shares the time period with the former hit as well, but the high quotient of irrepressibly sly fun is missing. Noticeably absent is the typical creative inventiveness of director Jack O'Brien and choreographer Jerry Mitchell. The score by Marc Shaiman and Scott Wittman is more ambitious than their work on "Hairspray," but they are hamstrung by all those production numbers for sexy stewardesses and sexy nurses. Newcomer to the writing team is librettist Terrence McNally, with reportedly extensive ghostwriting by Brian Yorkey ("Next to Normal"). The problem, though, doesn't seem to be the book but the source material. If there is a musical to be made from this tale of a bumbling FBI agent chasing a naively innocent charmer, the creators haven't found it."

Elysa Gardner of USA Today said, "Boasting a score by the famously witty team of Marc Shaiman and Scott Wittman and a book by Terrence McNally, Catch Me is too ambitious and stylish in its efforts to entertain and move us to induce boredom. The musical is structured so that we see our mischievous finagler crafting his own story, introducing some numbers and then literally trying to sing and dance his way out of trouble. It's a canny conceit, but one that only emphasizes the character's disingenuousness. There are other elegant and frisky flourishes, from William Ivey Long's eye-candy costumes to Jerry Mitchell's vampish choreography – both of which draw attention to the leggy, voluptuous figures in the female ensemble. Still, in failing to deliver a youthful protagonist you can really cheer for, this Catch Me If You Can may leave you feeling a bit cheated."

== Awards and nominations ==
=== Original Broadway production ===
Year	Award Ceremony	Category	Nominee	Result	Ref
2011	Tony Award	Best Musical		Nominated	
2011	Tony Award	Best Performance by a Leading Actor in a Musical	Norbert Leo Butz	Won	
2011	Tony Award	Best Sound Design	Steve Canyon Kennedy	Nominated	
2011	Tony Award	Best Orchestrations	Marc Shaiman and Larry Blank	Nominated	
2011	Drama Desk Award	Outstanding Actor in a Musical	Norbert Leo Butz	Won	
2011	Drama Desk Award	Outstanding Featured Actor in a Musical	Tom Wopat	Nominated	
2011	Drama Desk Award	Outstanding Featured Actress in a Musical	Kerry Butler	Nominated	
2011	Drama Desk Award	Outstanding Music	Marc Shaiman	Nominated	
2011	Drama Desk Award	Outstanding Lyrics	Scott Wittman and Marc Shaiman	Nominated	
2011	Drama Desk Award	Outstanding Orchestrations	Marc Shaiman and Larry Blank	Nominated	

== Recordings ==
An original Broadway cast recording was released digitally on May 23, 2011, by Ghostlight Records, prior to a June 28 release in stores. The recording features a bonus track sung by Tom Wopat, "Fifty Checks", which was cut from the musical after the Seattle tryout.

== International productions ==
=== South Korea (2012) ===
Starring Um Ki-joon, Kim Jeong-hoon, Park Gwang-hyun, Kyuhyun of Super Junior and Key of Shinee rotating as Frank Abagnale Jr., the musical ran from March 28 to June 10, 2012, at the Blue Square, Samsung Card Hall, in Hannam-dong, Seoul.

=== Japan (2015) ===
Presented by the all-female Takarazuka Revue, the production was performed by Star Troupe, starring Yuzuru Kurenai as Frank Abagnale Jr, Airi Kisaki as Brenda Strong and Hiroki Nanami as Carl Hanratty. The musical ran from June 17 to 23, 2015 at Akasaka ACT Theater in Tokyo and June 29 to July 6, 2015, at Umeda Arts Theater Theater Drama City in Osaka.

=== Australia (2016) ===
The Australian premiere production as presented by Williamstown Musical Theatre Company opened in Melbourne on May 6 and ran for a limited season from May 6–21, 2017, at Williamstown Mechanics Institute.

=== New Zealand (2023) ===
The New Zealand premiere production of Catch Me If You Can was performed in Auckland, New Zealand from February 17-25, 2023, hosted by DeBase Music Centre.

=== Poland (2023) ===
The Polish production had its premiere on March 18 at the Musical Theater in Łódź.

=== Germany (2023) ===
The musical was performed for a limited time from June 16 to July 9, 2023 as an Open Air Musical in Magdeburg.
