= Louisiana State Bar Association =

Bar Association

- Type: Mandatory Bar Association
- Headquarters: New Orleans, LA
- Location: United States
- Website: http://www.lsba.org/

The Louisiana State Bar Association (LSBA) is the integrated (mandatory) bar association of the U.S. state of Louisiana. The mission of the Louisiana State Bar Association is to assist and serve its members in the practice of law, assure access to and aid in the administration of justice, assist the Supreme Court in the regulation of the practice of law, uphold the honor of the courts and the profession, promote the professional competence of attorneys, increase public understanding of and respect for the law, and encourage collegiality among its members.

== History ==
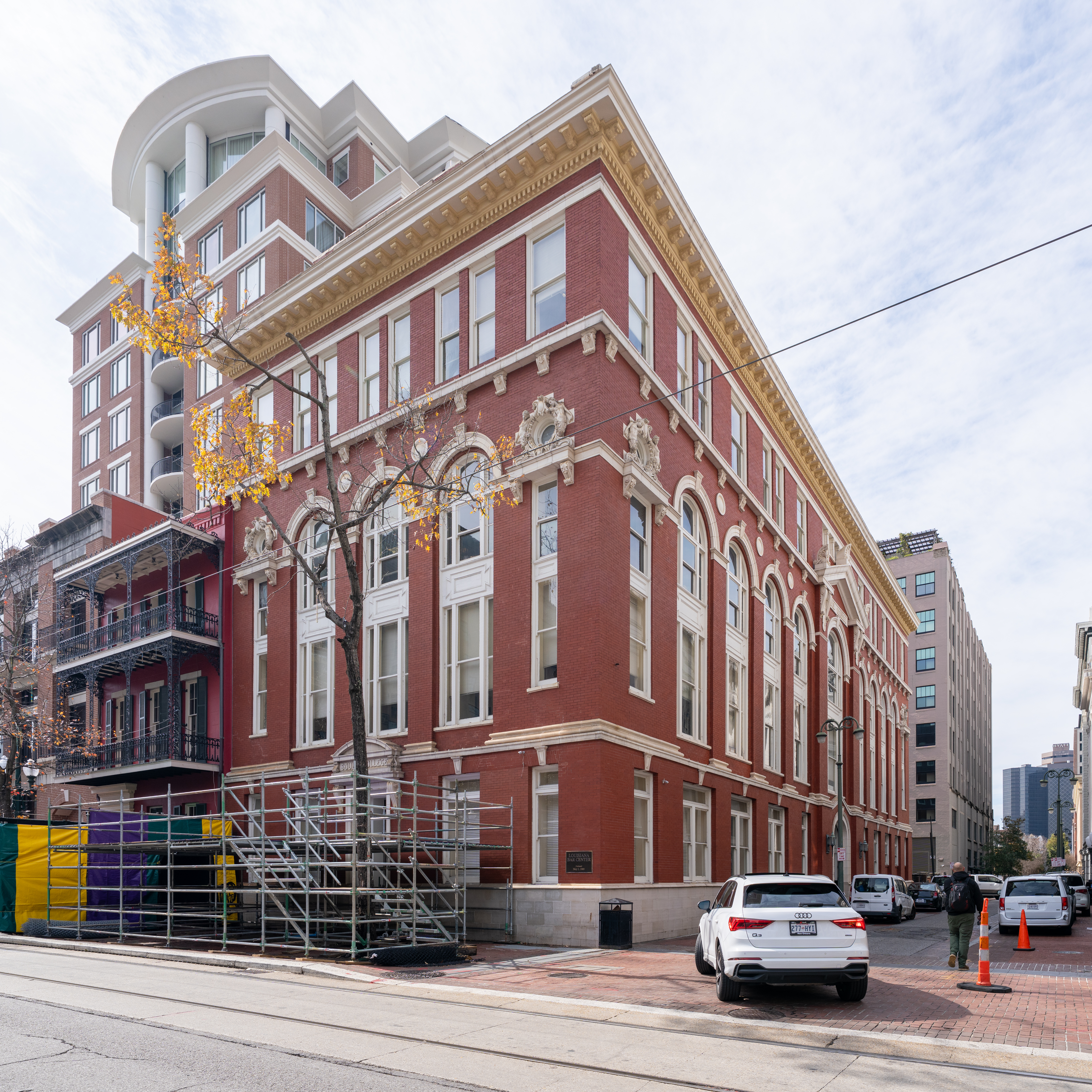
Headquarters (2026)

Several organizations are forerunners to the Louisiana State Bar Association:

- The Association of the Bar of New Orleans, founded 1847
- The New Orleans Law Association, founded 1855
- The Louisiana Bar Association, founded 1899.

In 1929, the Louisiana State Bar Association was founded as a voluntary organization; its first president was Cecil C. Byrd. Act 54 of the 1940 Louisiana Legislative Session authorized the Louisiana Supreme Court to create the Louisiana State Bar Association and require all lawyers practicing in Louisiana to be members. On March 12, 1941, the LSBA organized as a Louisiana corporation under the rule-making power of the Louisiana Supreme Court. The first LSBA Annual Meeting was held in Lake Charles, LA on April 18–19, 1941. In 1957, the LSBA Articles of Incorporation were amended to create the House of Delegates.

In 2009, Kim M. Boyle became the first African-American woman president of the organization.

== Structure ==
=== House of Delegates ===
The House of Delegates is the policy-making body of the LSBA. There is one elected delegate for each district judge. House members serve two-year terms. The House approves proposed amendments to the LSBA Bylaws and House Rules of Procedure, and also acts on resolutions submitted by bar groups or individuals.

=== Board of Governors ===
The LSBA Board of Governors is vested with the administration of the Association, including fiscal responsibility. There are 23 voting members, including ex-officio members, elected members, and at-large members. Board members serve terms of one, two or three years, depending upon their position. The officers of the Board of Governors include the president, president-elect, immediate past president, secretary and treasurer.

=== Young Lawyers Division ===
The LSBA Young Lawyers Division (YLD) includes every member who has not reached the age of 39 or who has been admitted for less than five years, whichever is later. The purpose of the Division is to foster discussions and interchange of ideas relative to the duties, responsibilities and problems of the younger members of the legal profession; to aid in their advancement; to encourage their interest and participation in the activities of the LSBA; and, in general, to further the purposes and objectives of the LSBA. The Division is governed by the elected YLD Council, which includes a chair, chair-elect, secretary, immediate past chair and 14 additional representatives.

=== Senior Lawyers Division ===
The LSBA Senior Lawyers Division (SLD) was created in 2012 and includes every member in good standing aged 65 or older. The purpose of the Division is to encourage and maximize participation of senior lawyers in the LSBA, while providing services and support to senior members of the bar. SLD Officers are appointed for one-year terms by the LSBA President and include a chair, vice chair and secretary/treasurer.

=== LSBA Committees ===
LSBA Committees operate to oversee basic bar services as well as special concerns. Most committee members and chairs are appointed by the LSBA President, with terms coinciding with the LSBA fiscal year. In keeping with the LSBA strategic plan and individual committee mission statements, committees discharge responsibilities as directed by the LSBA President and may take on special projects as directed by the Board of Governors and/or the House of Delegates.

=== LSBA Sections ===
LSBA Sections are voluntary groups that enable attorneys to network within their specific fields and areas of interest. Bar members can use sections to get in touch with other licensed legal professionals working in the same areas of practice to exchange advice and support. LSBA members may elect to join sections by paying section dues annually in the spring. Each section elects their own chair; section chairs serve as voting members of the House of Delegates.

== Affiliate Entities ==
=== Regulatory Affiliates ===
- Supreme Court of Louisiana
- Louisiana Attorney Disciplinary Board, including the Office of Disciplinary Counsel, which handles prosecutorial functions
- Committee on Bar Admissions

=== LSBA Regulatory Entities ===
- Louisiana Board of Legal Specialization
- Mandatory Continuing Legal Education Committee
- Judges and Lawyers Assistance Program

=== Other Affiliates ===
- Louisiana Bar Foundation
- Louisiana Client Assistance Foundation
- Louisiana Center for Law and Civic Education

== See also ==
- Louisiana law
