= Aaron Tveit =

American actor and singer (born 1983)

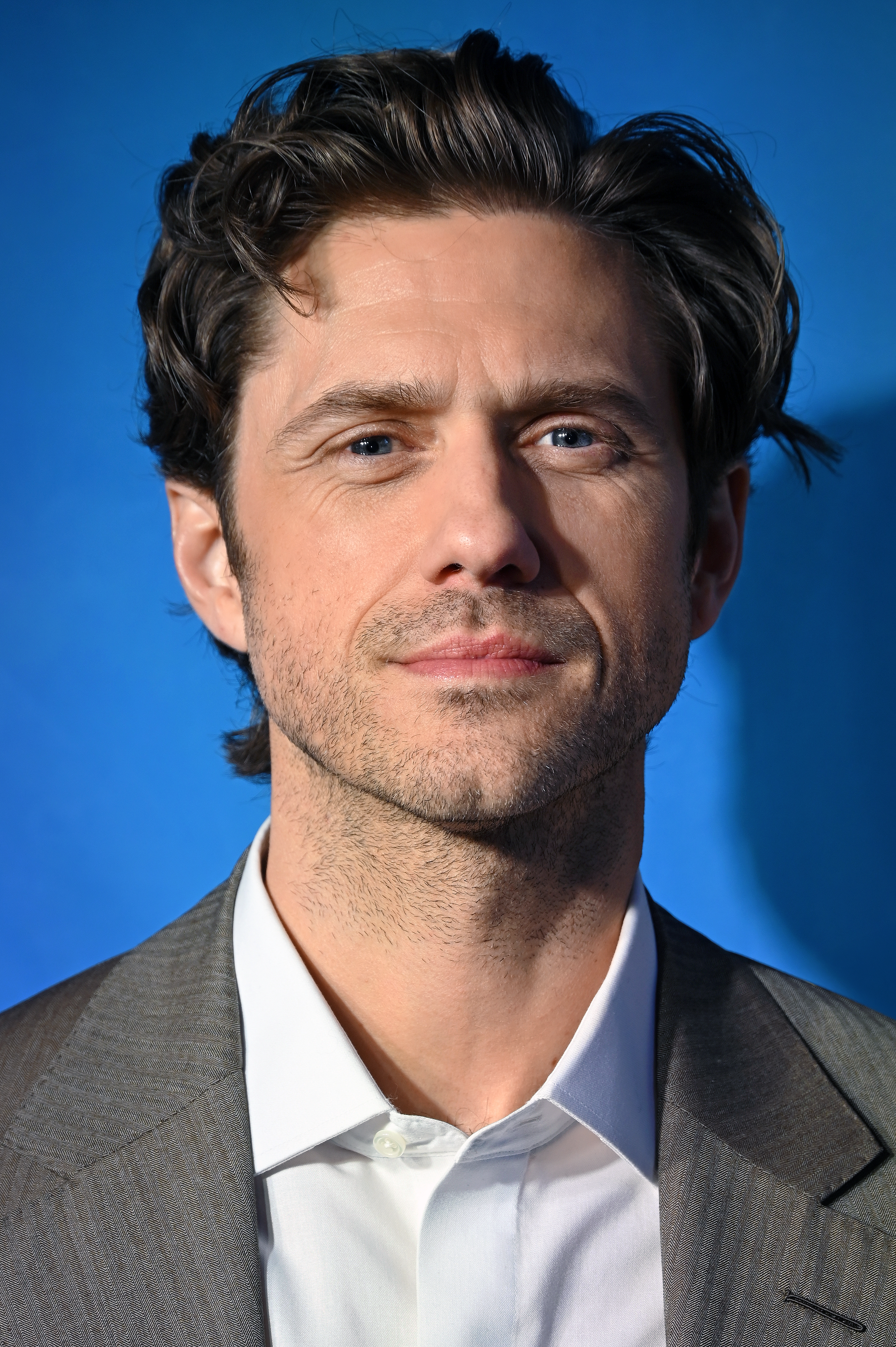
- Tveit in 2026
- Born: Aaron Kyle Tveit; October 21, 1983 (age 43); Middletown, New York, U.S.
- Education: Ithaca College (BFA)
- Occupations: Actor and singer
- Years active: 2003–present
- Spouse: Ericka Hunter Yang (m. 2025)
- Children: 1

Aaron Kyle Tveit (/təˈveɪt/; born October 21, 1983) is an American actor and singer. Tveit originated the lead role of Christian in the stage adaptation of Moulin Rouge! on Broadway, a performance for which he won the Tony Award for Best Leading Actor in a Musical and received a Grammy Award nomination. His other work on the Broadway stage includes the title role in Sweeney Todd: The Demon Barber of Fleet Street, Freddie Trumper in Chess, Fiyero Tigelaar in Wicked, and originating the roles of Gabe Goodman in Next to Normal and Frank Abagnale Jr. in Catch Me If You Can. He also played John Wilkes Booth in an Off West End production of Assassins.

Tveit has also portrayed several musical theatre roles on screen, such as Enjolras in the film adaptation of Les Misérables (2012), as well as Danny Zuko in Fox's Grease: Live (2016). Tveit is also known for his work in television, including the roles of Tripp van der Bilt on Gossip Girl, Mike Warren on Graceland, Danny Bailey/Topher in Schmigadoon!, and Gareth Ritter on BrainDead.

== Early life and education ==
Tveit was born in Middletown, New York, to Posie and Stanley Tveit. His brother, Jon, is five years younger and a Catholic priest in the Archdiocese of New York. His surname is Norwegian and means ‘(small) plot of land, paddock’ (from ON *þveit, comp. Eng. thwaite).

Tveit graduated from Middletown High School in 2001, where he was active both in chorus and sports, playing golf, soccer and basketball; he also starred in all four of his school's musical theater productions: Seymour in Little Shop of Horrors in 9th grade, Joe Hardy in Damn Yankees in 10th grade, Tony in West Side Story in 11th grade, and Huck in Big River in 12th grade. As a child, he played the violin and French horn. He turned down business school scholarships to major in vocal performance at Ithaca College, a decision his parents supported, before switching to musical theater after his first year because he missed acting and theater.

== Career ==
=== 2003–2007: Early career and Broadway debut ===
Tveit began his professional career in 2003 when he joined the national tour of Rent as Steve and the understudy for Roger/Mark. He was in his second year of studying at Ithaca College at the time; nine years later, in 2012, Tveit completed his college degree, when he was given college credit for his theatre roles.

Following Rent, he returned to school briefly but left to play Link Larkin in the first national tour of Hairspray. He made his Broadway debut in this role in 2006. In the following two years, he performed in regional productions including as Matt in Barrington Stage Company's Calvin Berger in July 2007 and as D'Artagnan in a musical adaptation of The Three Musketeers which played at the North Shore Music Theatre from August to September 2007, before returning to the Broadway production of Hairspray. Other credits include an early workshop of The Black Suits. Tveit made his film debut in Ghost Town (2008), as a young anesthesiologist.

=== 2008–2011: Rise to prominence ===
In 2007, Tveit originated the role of Gabe in the Off-Broadway production of the musical Next to Normal. The production ran from January 16 through March 16, 2008, at the Second Stage Theater. Tveit received a nomination for the Lucille Lortel Award for Outstanding Featured Actor for this role. In the interim time before the out-of-town production of Next to Normal, Tveit played Dean in the musical theatre adaptation of the film Saved!, which ran for a limited engagement at Playwrights Horizons in June 2008. Also in June 2008, Tveit took over the role of Fiyero in Wicked on Broadway. He left the show in November to reprise his role in the Arena Stage production of Next to Normal, for which he won the 2009 Helen Hayes Award for Outstanding Supporting Performer in a Non-Resident Production.

Tveit returned to Wicked as Fiyero in January 2009. However, he left once again on March 8, 2009 to join the Broadway production of Next to Normal, which began previews in March 2009 and officially opened on April 15. His performance as Gabe earned him the Clarence Derwent Award from the Actors' Equity Association. Tveit was included on AfterElton.com's 2009 list of the "37 Hottest Guys in Theater". Tveit left Next to Normal on June 6, 2009, to prepare for Catch Me If You Can, where he played Frank Abagnale Jr. The musical was performed at the 5th Avenue Theatre in Seattle from July 28 through August 16, 2009. Tveit returned to Next to Normal from September 7 through January 3, 2010. In August, he also starred in the Hollywood Bowl's production of Rent directed by Neil Patrick Harris, as Roger Davis. He took part in the MCC Theater Miscast Gala in 2009 and 2010.

Tveit played Frank Abagnale Jr in the Broadway production of Catch Me If You Can, opening on April 10, 2011, and closing on September 4, 2011. For this role he was nominated for the Outer Critics Circle Award for Outstanding Actor in a Musical, the Drama League Award for Distinguished Performance, and the Fred Astaire Award for Best Male Dancer on Broadway.

During the Broadway production of Next to Normal, Tveit also had a recurring role in the CW series Gossip Girl as Tripp van der Bilt, the cousin of Nate Archibald. During this period, Tveit appeared in an episode of the television series Ugly Betty titled "All the World's a Stage" as Zachary Boule, Betty Suarez's boyfriend. He appeared in Rob Epstein's Howl, a biopic about the Allen Ginsberg poem and the controversy and trial that ensued after its publication. Tveit played Peter Orlovsky, Ginsberg's longtime partner, opposite James Franco. He was also a guest star on Law & Order: Special Victims Unit twice.

=== 2012–2017: Focus on screen acting ===
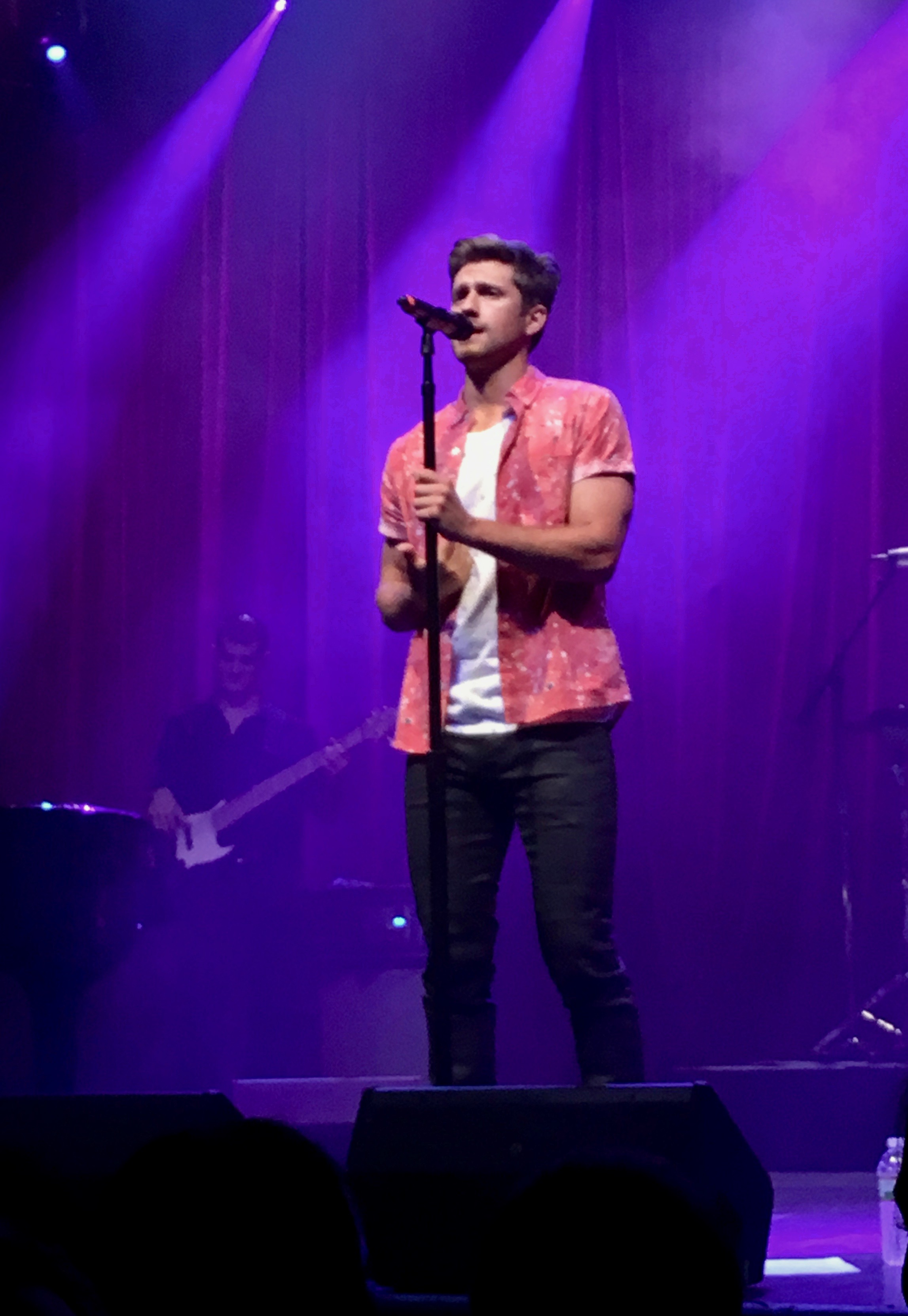
Tveit singing in 2016

In 2012, Tveit played Enjolras, leader of the student revolutionary group in the film adaptation of Les Misérables. As the 'designated Broadway actor' in a celebrity ensemble cast, this was one of Tveit's most high-profile roles up to that point. On February 24, 2013, he performed with the cast of Les Misérables at the 85th Academy Awards ceremony. In July 2012, Tveit took part in a private reading for a new musical based on the animated film, Anastasia. He read for the character Dimitri, a con man who brings Anastasia to a wealthy Empress searching for her missing granddaughter, in return for a reward. The following year, he starred in the USA Network series Graceland where he played undercover FBI Special Agent Mike Warren. The show premiered on June 6, 2013, and ran for thirty-eight episodes before being canceled after the completion of its third season in October 2015.

Between filming seasons of Graceland, Tveit starred and made his London stage debut in the Menier Chocolate Factory's production of Stephen Sondheim's Assassins as John Wilkes Booth. The production ran from November 21, 2014, to March 7, 2015. However, he had to leave the production on February 8, due to his working schedule, he was replaced by Michael Xavier. During this time he also began performing solo concerts and recorded his own album The Radio in My Head as well as the concept album for a new Broadway show An American Victory: A New Musical in January 2014 with Ashley Brown, Hugh Panaro, Ruthie Henshall, Alexander Gemignani, and many other Broadway stars. The cast recording was released more than two years later in April 2016. Additionally, he appeared in the film Big Sky which was released on August 14, 2015 and performed at the first Elsie Fest in New York that September.

Following the end of Graceland, Tveit was cast in a variety of other television and film productions. In 2016, Tveit appeared as Danny Zuko in a live version of Grease that aired on Fox on January 31. He is featured on the soundtrack for Grease Live. He returned to the MCC Theater Miscast Gala in April 2016. Tveit then starred in the baseball themed movie Undrafted which was released on July 15. His next film Better Off Single was released in theaters and on demand on October 7.

In October 2015, it was announced that Tveit would star in CBS's summer series BrainDead, which premiered on June 13, 2016. Following the cancellation of BrainDead after one season on October 17, 2016, Tveit had time to perform more concerts in 2017 and more screen roles including a reprisal of his role from The Good Wife on an episode of The Good Fight and a starring role in the independent film Created Equal which held screenings in early 2018. Tveit returned to Barrington Stage Company for their production of Company in the role of Bobby, running from August 10 to September 10, 2017. He next had a role in the Patricia Clarkson-starring crime thriller Out of Blue, which premiered at the 2018 Toronto International Film Festival.

=== 2018–present: Return to Broadway and Tony Award win ===
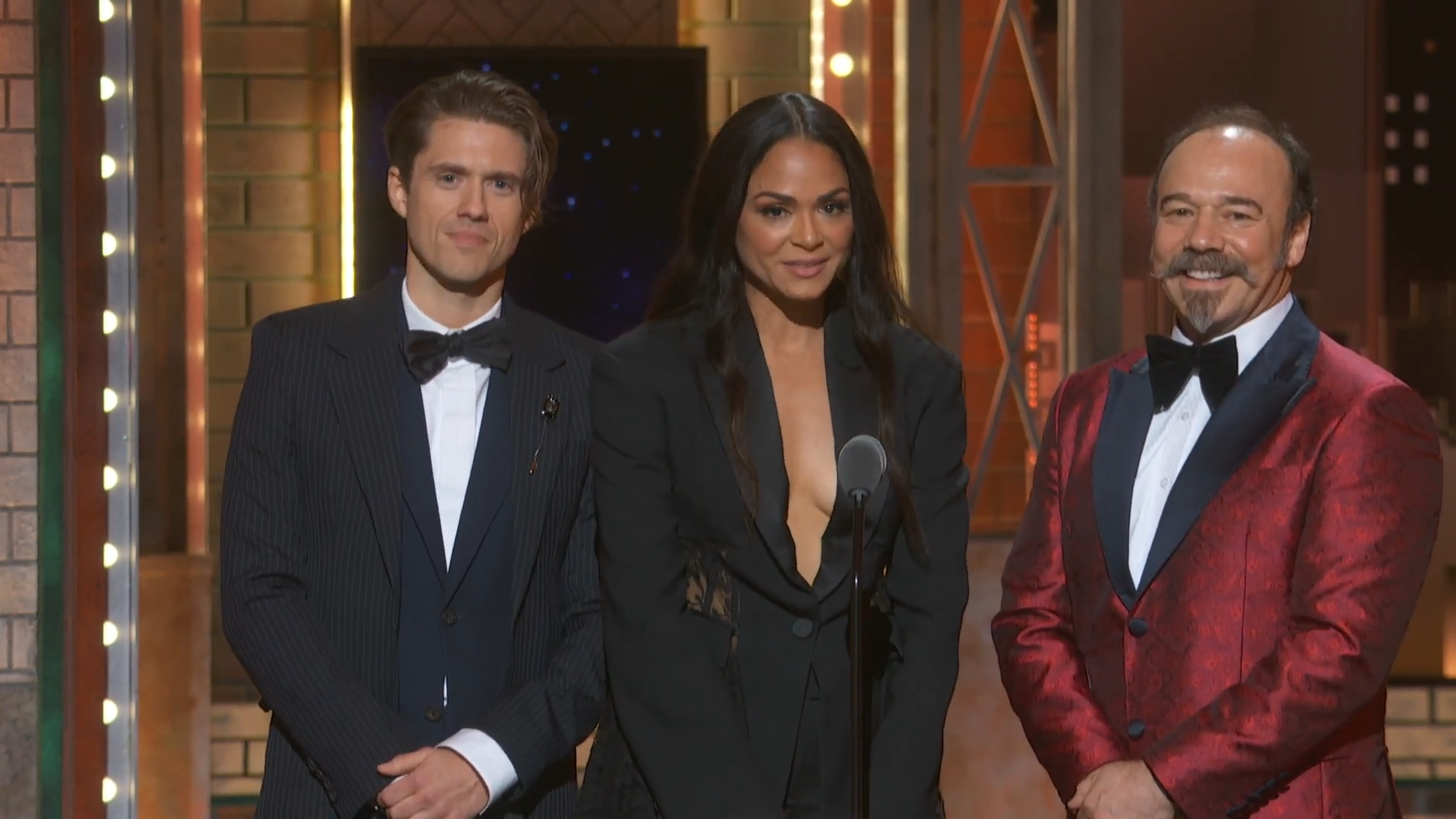
Tveit, Karen Olivo and Danny Burstein at the Tony Awards in 2019

In November 2017, Tveit participated in a developmental lab for the stage adaptation of the 2001 movie Moulin Rouge!, cast in the role as Christian, the character originally created by Ewan McGregor. In April 2018, it was announced that Tveit would be reprising his role in the premiere engagement of Moulin Rouge! at Boston's Emerson Colonial Theatre. The musical's premiere was scheduled for June 27; however, delays pushed the start of performances to July 10, 2018. Between the Boston and Broadway productions of Moulin Rouge!, Tveit had a recurring role as the aspiring politician Matt Dobbins on the 2019 CBS show The Code.

Tveit starred as Christian in the Broadway production of Moulin Rouge! at the Al Hirschfeld Theatre; previews began on June 28, 2019, and the production had its opening night on July 25. Tveit has been universally praised for his portrayal; New York Times theater critic Ben Brantley said that Christian was "a role [Tveit] was born to play" during the Boston run of the show and later said that his 'passionate and uncompromising' performance was his "best Broadway work to date". The production was put on hold, beginning on March 12, 2020, due to the COVID-19 pandemic, and on March 23, Tveit became the first Broadway star to announce a positive COVID-19 test result. He was one of at least four cast members who contracted the virus. He was nominated for the Tony Award for Best Leading Actor in a Musical, one of the musical's fourteen nominations at the 74th Tony Awards. Although not the only eligible actor in the category, he made history as the sole nominee for his category. He won the award, having received an affirmative vote by 60% or more of Tony voters. Tveit resumed his role as Christian when Moulin Rouge! reopened on September 24, 2021. With other original cast members, he departed the production on May 8, 2022.

During Broadway's closure in 2020, Tveit filmed the movie One Royal Holiday, part of Hallmark Channel's Countdown to Christmas movie slate. Tveit starred opposite theater actresses Laura Osnes and Krystal Joy Brown. Released in April 2021, Tveit was a cast member of Hit Job, a scripted comedy podcast produced by Lorne Michaels' Broadway Video for Audible. That year he also appeared in two episodes of the horror anthology series American Horror Stories. In 2021, he played Danny Bailey in the Apple TV+ musical comedy parody series Schmigadoon!; in the show's second season he plays Topher, a young hippie seeking his purpose in life. Tveit returned to Moulin Rouge! as Christian for 12 weeks beginning on January 17, 2023.

On February 9, 2024, Tveit replaced Nicholas Christopher in the Broadway revival of Sweeney Todd: The Demon Barber of Fleet Street in the title role. His run ended on May 5, following a 12-week limited engagement. From June 11–29, Tveit performed in a concert residency at the Café Carlyle, his debut at that venue. That same month, it was announced that he had been cast in the MGM+ series Earth Abides, which premiered in December. He then returned to Moulin Rouge! as Christian in a 12-week engagement starting on July 23, 2024. In March 2025, Tveit performed "Weak" with Joanna "JoJo" Levesque during a New York City concert. Tveit starred as Freddie Trumper in the Broadway revival of Chess; previews began on October 15, 2025 and opening night occurred on November 16. The production closed on June 21, 2026. His next television project, American Classic, premiered on MGM+ in March 2026. In July 2026, he performed at Radio City Music Hall in an encore performance of the songs "One Day More" and "Bring Him Home" with actors Alfie Boe, Killian Donnelly, Hugh Panaro, Peter Lockyer, and Gerónimo Rauch after a performance of Les Misérables, reprising his role of Enjolras for "One Day More".

== Personal life ==
Tveit moved to Manhattan in 2006 where he first lived in the Hell's Kitchen neighborhood. From 2007 to 2020, he lived in Astoria, Queens. He is married to Canadian actress and dancer Ericka Hunter Yang, with whom he has one daughter.

== Acting credits ==
=== Film ===
Year	Title	Role	Notes
2008	Ghost Town	Anesthesiologist	
2010	Howl	Peter Orlovsky	
2011	Girl Walks into a Bar	Henry	
2012	Premium Rush	Kyle	
2012	Les Misérables	Enjolras	
2013	A Dream of Flying	The Young Man	Short film
2015	Big Sky	Pru	
2016	Undrafted	John "Maz" Mazzello	
2016	Better Off Single	Charlie	
2017	Created Equal	Tommy Reilly	
2018	Out of Blue	Tony Silvero	
TBA	Nice Eggs †		Post-production

=== Television ===
Year	Title	Role	Notes
2009–2012	Gossip Girl	William "Tripp" van der Bilt III	10 episodes
2010	Ugly Betty	Zachary Boule	Episode: "All the World's a Stage"
2010–2011	Law & Order: Special Victims Unit	Jan Eyck/Steve Harris	2 episodes
2011	Body of Proof	Skip	Episode: "Point of Origin"
2011	The Good Wife	Spencer Zschau	Episode: "Executive Order 13224"
2013–2015	Graceland	Mike Warren	Main cast (38 episodes)
2016	Grease Live!	Danny Zuko	Television movie
2016	BrainDead	Gareth Ritter	Main cast (13 episodes)
2017–2021	The Good Fight	Spencer Zschau	3 episodes
2019	The Code	Matt Dobbins	5 episodes
2020	One Royal Holiday	Prince James Gallant	Television movie
2021	American Horror Stories	Adam/Jay Gantz	2 episodes
2021–2023	Schmigadoon!	Danny Bailey/Topher	Main cast (12 episodes)
2024	Earth Abides	Charlie	2 episodes
2026	American Classic	Troy	

=== Theatre ===
Year	Title	Role	Venue	Notes
2003	Footloose	Garvin	Merry-Go-Round Playhouse: 2003	Regional production
2004	Rent	Steve u/s Roger Davis u/s Mark Cohen	US national tour: January – December 2004	National tour replacement
2005–2006	Hairspray	Link Larkin	US national tour: August 2005 – July 2006	First national tour replacement
2006–2007	Hairspray	Link Larkin	Neil Simon Theatre: July 18, 2006 – January 18, 2007	Broadway replacement
2007	Calvin Berger	Matt	Barrington Stage Company: July 3–14, 2007	Original regional production
2007	The Three Musketeers	Charles d'Artagnan	North Shore Music Theatre: August 21 – September 9, 2007	Regional production
2008	Next to Normal	Gabe Goodman	Second Stage Theatre: January 16 – March 16, 2008	Original Off-Broadway production
2008	Hairspray	Link Larkin	Neil Simon Theatre: April 1 – May 4, 2008	Limited Broadway engagement
2008	Saved!	Dean Withers	Playwrights Horizons: May 10 – June 22, 2008	Original Off-Broadway production
2008	Wicked	Fiyero Tigelaar	Gershwin Theatre: June 24 – November 9, 2008	Broadway replacement
2008–2009	Next to Normal	Gabe Goodman	Arena Stage: November 21, 2008 – January 18, 2009	Original Washington, D.C. production
2009	Wicked	Fiyero Tigelaar	Gershwin Theatre: January 20 – March 9, 2009	Broadway replacement
2009	Next to Normal	Gabe Goodman	Booth Theatre: March 27 – June 8, 2009	Original Broadway production
2009	Catch Me If You Can	Frank Abagnale, Jr.	5th Avenue Theatre: July 28 – August 16, 2009	World premiere production
2009–2010	Next to Normal	Gabe Goodman	Booth Theatre: September 7, 2009 – January 4, 2010	Original Broadway production
2010	Rent	Roger Davis	Hollywood Bowl: August 6–8, 2010	Limited engagement
2011	Catch Me If You Can	Frank Abagnale, Jr.	Neil Simon Theatre: March 11 – September 4, 2011	Original Broadway production
2012	Anastasia	Dmitry Sudayev	Unknown	Reading
2014–2015	Assassins	John Wilkes Booth	Menier Chocolate Factory: November 21, 2014 – February 8, 2015	Off-West End, London
2017	Company	Robert	Barrington Stage Company: August 10 – September 10, 2017	Regional
2017	Moulin Rouge! The Musical	Christian	Unknown	Workshop
2018	Moulin Rouge! The Musical	Christian	Emerson Colonial Theatre: July 10 – August 19, 2018	World premiere production
2019–2020	Moulin Rouge! The Musical	Christian	Al Hirschfeld Theatre: June 28, 2019 – March 11, 2020	Original Broadway production; paused due to COVID-19
2021–2022	Moulin Rouge! The Musical	Christian	Al Hirschfeld Theatre: September 24, 2021 – May 8, 2022	Original Broadway production; paused due to COVID-19
2023	Moulin Rouge! The Musical	Christian	Al Hirschfeld Theatre: January 17 – April 9, 2023; July 1, 2023	Limited Broadway engagement
2024	Gutenberg! The Musical!	The Producer	James Earl Jones Theatre; January 2, 2024	Broadway cameo
2024	Sweeney Todd: The Demon Barber of Fleet Street	Sweeney Todd	Lunt-Fontanne Theatre: February 9 – May 5, 2024	Broadway replacement
2024	Moulin Rouge! The Musical	Christian	Al Hirschfeld Theatre: July 23 – October 13, 2024	Limited Broadway engagement
2025–2026	Chess	Freddie Trumper	Imperial Theatre: October 15, 2025 – June 21, 2026	Broadway revival
2026	Moulin Rouge! The Musical	Christian	Al Hirschfeld Theatre: August 18 – 29, 2026	Limited Broadway engagement

=== Podcasts and audio books ===
Year	Title	Voice role	Notes	Ref.
2011	Perfect by Ellen Hopkins	Co-narrator	Audio book	
2011	The Angel Esmerelda: Nine Stories by Don DeLillo	Co-narrator	Audio book	
2012	Dead To You by Lisa McMann	Narrator	Audio book	
2017	Mrs. Fletcher by Tom Perrotta	Co-narrator	Audio book	
2021	Hit Job	Hot Kyle	Audible original podcast	

== Discography ==
=== Solo albums ===
- The Radio In My Head: Live at 54 Below (Broadway Records, 2013)

=== Cast recordings ===
- Next to Normal (Original Broadway Cast Recording) (Ghostlight Records, 2009);12 tracks
- Catch Me If You Can (Original Broadway Cast Recording) (Sh-K-Boom Records, 2011); 10 tracks
- Les Misérables: Highlights from the Motion Picture Soundtrack (Universal Republic, 2012); 4 tracks
- Les Misérables: The Motion Picture Soundtrack (Deluxe Edition) (Polydor Records, 2013); 9 tracks
- Grease Live! (Music From the Television Event) (Paramount Pictures, 2016); 6 tracks
- An American Victory (Studio Cast Recording) (Broadway Records, 2016); "Sons of Adventure"
- Moulin Rouge! The Musical (Original Broadway Cast Recording) (RCA, 2019); 13 tracks
- Hallmark Channel's Christmas Album, Vol. II (Crown Media/Warner Music Nashville, 2020); "Winter Wonderland" from One Royal Holiday
- Schmigadoon! (Apple TV+ Original Series Soundtrack) EPs (Milan Records, 2021)
- Album (Ghostlight Records, 2022); "The Answer"
- CHESS the Musical (2025 Broadway Cast Recording) (Ghostlight Records, 2026); 12 Tracks

== Accolades ==
=== Film and television ===
Year	Award	Category	Work	Result	Ref
2012	Washington D.C. Area Film Critics Association Award	Best Ensemble	Les Misérables	Won	
2012	San Diego Film Critics Society Award	Best Performance by an Ensemble	Les Misérables	Nominated	
2012	17th Satellite Award	Best Cast – Motion Picture	Les Misérables	Won	
2012	Phoenix Film Critics Society Award	Best Cast	Les Misérables	Nominated	
2012	National Board of Review Award	Best Cast	Les Misérables	Won	
2013	Critics' Choice Award	Best Acting Ensemble	Les Misérables	Nominated	
2013	Screen Actors Guild Award	Outstanding Performance by a Cast in a Motion Picture	Les Misérables	Nominated	
2017	MTV Movie & TV Awards	Best Musical Moment	Grease Live! "You're The One That I Want"	Won	
2017	Sunscreen Film Festival Award	Best Actor	Created Equal	Won	

=== Theatre ===
Year	Award	Category	Work	Result	Ref
2008	Lucille Lortel Awards	Outstanding Featured Actor	Next to Normal	Nominated	
2009	Helen Hayes Award	Outstanding Supporting Performance, Non-Resident Production	Next to Normal	Won	
2009	Clarence Derwent Award	Most Promising Male Performer	Next to Normal	Won	
2011	Drama League Awards	Distinguished Performance	Catch Me If You Can	Nominated	
2011	Outer Critics Circle Awards	Outstanding Actor in a Musical	Catch Me If You Can	Nominated	
2011	Chita Rivera Awards for Dance and Choreography	Best Male Dancer	Catch Me If You Can	Nominated	
2017	Berkshire Theatre Awards	Outstanding Performance by a Lead Actor in a Musical	Company	Nominated	
2019	IRNE Awards	Best Actor in a Musical	Moulin Rouge!	Nominated	
2019	Broadway.com's Star of the Year		Moulin Rouge!	Nominated	
2020	Tony Award	Best Performance by a Leading Actor in a Musical	Moulin Rouge!	Won	
2020	Outer Critics Circle Award	Outstanding Actor in a Musical	Moulin Rouge!	Honoree	
2026	Broadway.com Audience Choice Awards	Favorite Leading Actor in a Musical	Chess	Nominated	
2026	Broadway.com Audience Choice Awards	Favorite Onstage Pair (with Nicholas Christopher)	Chess	Nominated	
2026	Broadway.com Audience Choice Awards	Favorite Onstage Pair (with Lea Michele)	Chess	Nominated	
2026	Broadway.com Audience Choice Awards	Performance of the Year (Musical)	Chess	Nominated	
