= Matt Lenz =

Matt Lenz (born March 11, 1964) is a New York City-based theatre director. His career encompasses work on Broadway, Off-Broadway, national tours, regional theater and international productions. He is a member of the Stage Directors and Choreographers Society.

== Early life ==
Lenz was born in Rockford, Illinois, where he attended and graduated from Keith Country Day School. After graduating from Wagner College (Staten Island, NY) with a Bachelor of Arts in Speech and Theatre in 1986, Lenz worked as an actor in regional theatres, TV commercials and Off-Broadway for two years in Charles Busch's long-running hit comedy, Vampire Lesbians of Sodom (1989–91). From 1989–1994, Lenz worked part-time as a theatrical publicist with Shirley Herz Associates and The Pete Sanders Group.

== Career ==
Lenz began his Broadway career as assistant director on Disney's Beauty and the Beast (also on the first and second National tours, the Los Angeles production and the Toronto production). He was the associate director to Tony Award-winning director Jack O'Brien on the 2002 Tony Award-winning Best Musical Hairspray (starring Harvey Fierstein, Dick Latessa, Marissa Jaret Winoker and Matthew Morrison). Lenz subsequently directed US tours and international productions in Toronto, Johannesburg, South Africa, Germany and the United Kingdom.

He was also associate director on the original Broadway productions of Catch Me If You Can (2011) starring Aaron Tveit, Norbert Leo Butz and Tom Wopat, The Velocity of Autumn (2014) starring Estelle Parsons and Stephen Spinella and Charlie and the Chocolate Factory (2017) starring Christian Borle.

Off-Broadway, Lenz directed the Drama Desk Award-nominated revival of the hit musical Pageant (2014), and the Martin Casella comedy, The Irish Curse at SoHo Playhouse in 2010. He won Best Director for the New York Musical Theatre Festival in 2008 for the original comedy musical, Idaho! which went on to have productions at The Forestburgh Playhouse and at the Smith Center for the Performing Arts in Las Vegas, both directed by Lenz.

He directed the national touring production of A Christmas Story: The Musical in 2014 and the production has continued to tour major US cities for six years at the Christmas holidays (2014-2019).

Lenz also conceived and directed the 2016 tour of Cheers: Live Onstage which premiered at the Shubert Theatre in Boston.

In 2018 he directed the acclaimed US premiere of Grumpy Old Men: The Musical (book by Dan Remmes, music by Neil Berg and lyrics Nick Meglin) at the historic Ogunquit Playhouse in Maine. The production starred Hal Linden, Mark Jacoby and Sally Struthers. In 2019, the production went on to make its West Coast premiere at La Mirada Theatre in California starring Cathy Rigby and Ken Page, with Jacoby and Linden reprising their roles.
