= Dan Remmes =

American writer and actor

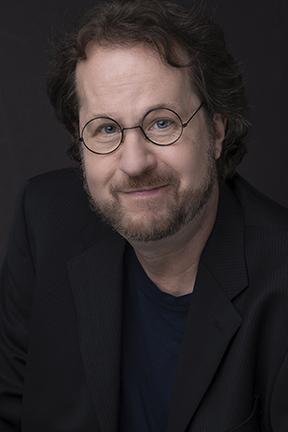
- Born: Stoughton, Massachusetts, U.S.
- Education: Tufts University, American Academy of Dramatic Arts
- Occupations: Writer, Actor

Dan Remmes is an American writer and actor. He is best known as the author of Grumpy Old Men: The Musical, based on the 1993 movie Grumpy Old Men.

== Writer ==
As a playwright, Remmes received several awards and was a recipient of the 2002 New York Foundation for the Arts Fellowship for Playwriting and Screenwriting.

Remmes collaborated with composer Neil Berg and lyricist and long-time editor of MAD Magazine, the late Nick Meglin, on a stage musical adaptation of the 1993 film Grumpy Old Men starring Jack Lemmon and Walter Matthau. In 2011, it received an out-of-town tryout at the Royal Manitoba Theatre Centre in Winnipeg, starring John Rubinstein, John Schuck, and Susan Anton. A retooled version made its United States premiere at the Ogunquit Playhouse in 2018, starring Mark Jacoby, Ed Dixon, Leslie Stevens, and Hal Linden and Sally Struthers. The show is licensed by Theatrical Rights Worldwide (TRW).

One of Remmes' plays, Three Tables, was a winner of the Off-Broadway Festival of Plays and is frequently produced in North America and the United Kingdom. What Doesn't Kill Us received its Hollywood premiere, starring Emmy-winner Michelle Stafford, directed by Paul Provenza, and featuring Remmes in the role of Karl. Other produced plays include Night Out, Things We Leave Behind, Bedlam, Delays, and Leaving London.

Remmes co-created and co-wrote a musical web series parodying self-help gurus entitled Mother Eve's Secret Garden of Sensual Sisterhood, in which he also played the character of "Temp." The series has since been developed into an award-winning stage musical.

Remmes is a frequent collaborator with actor and producer Nellie Bellflower, with whom he has three screenplays in development.

== Actor ==
Remmes received a degree in acting from the American Academy of Dramatic Arts in Los Angeles and has appeared in theater in New York City and Los Angeles as well as on television shows such as Conviction, Law & Order: Criminal Intent, Blind Justice, and Law & Order: Special Victims Unit.

== Other ==
Remmes frequently writes and performs with Mind the Gap Theatre, an Anglo-American theatre company based in New York City. He also serves on their board of directors.

Remmes wrote a pop ballad entitled "Least Being Me" inspired by the superhero Batman.
