= Ogunquit Playhouse =

Theater in Ogunquit, Maine (opened 1937)

- U.S. National Register of Historic Places
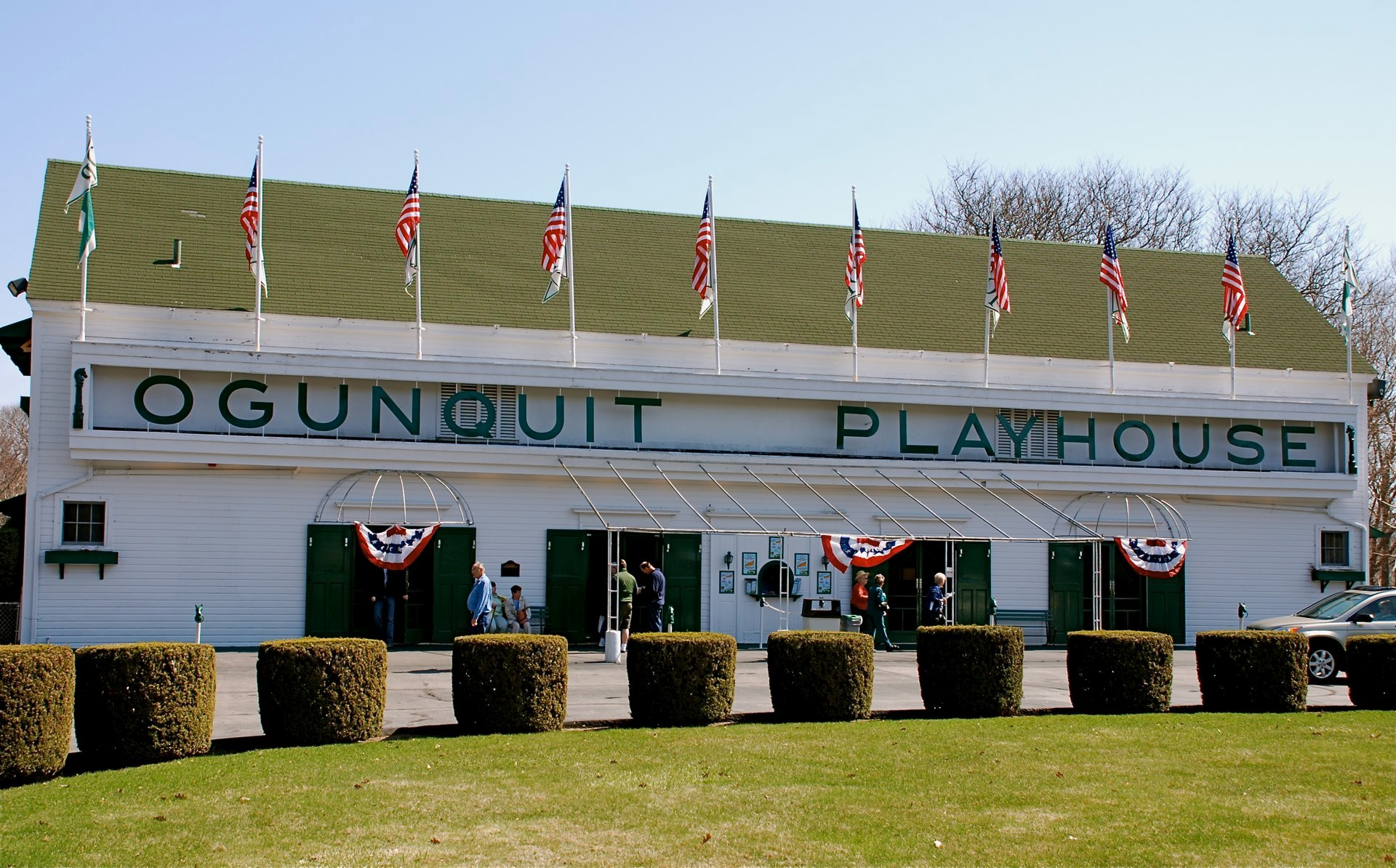

- Location within Maine Location within the United States
- Location: 10 Main Street (US 1), Ogunquit, Maine
- Coordinates: 43°14′20″N 70°36′2″W
- Area: 4.1 acres (1.7 ha)
- Built: 1937
- Architects: Wyckoff, Alexander
- Architectural style: Colonial Revival
- NRHP reference No.: 95001458
- Added to NRHP: December 14, 1995

Ogunquit Playhouse is a professional regional theater on 10 Main Street (United States Route 1) in Ogunquit, Maine. Ogunquit Playhouse is one of the last remaining summer theaters from the Summer Stock which still produces musical theatre. The Playhouse's season runs from May–October, producing 5 shows each season.

== New Works ==
Ogunquit Playhouse's New Works Program launched in 2016 and has fostered new productions such as Heartbreak Hotel, Grumpy Old Men, The Da Vinci Code, Mystic Pizza the Musical, From Here to Eternity, The Nutty Professor, and Mr. Holland’s Opus. According to the Boston Globe, “Developing new musicals has been part of the theater’s mission, and Kenney says he and the board have been looking for suitable projects and partnerships since 2016, when the theater launched its new works program. That program yielded staged readings of “Frida” and “Mr. Holland’s Opus” in New York, as well as the 2017 world premiere of “Heartbreak Hotel” (described as the prequel to “Million Dollar Quartet”), produced with Fingerlakes Musical Theatre Festival.” In 2024, Ogunquit Playhouse presented the World Premiere of My Best Friend’s Wedding based on the beloved Julia Roberts comedy. The World Premiere of Small Town featuring the music of John Mellencamp running October 1-November 1 will finish up the 2026 season.

== History ==
1927- Walter Hartwig starts the Manhattan Theatre Colony

1933- Walter and Maude Hartwig establish Ogunquit Playhouse in a downtown garage

1937- The Playhouse is built at 10 Main St

1941- Walter Hartwig dies, Maude Hartwig takes over

1950- John Lane becomes General Manager, then owner of Ogunquit Playhouse with business partner, Henry Weller

1994- John Lane retires and transfers ownership of the Playhouse to the Ogunquit Playhouse Foundation, a not-for-profit foundation that oversees the Playhouse to this day

1999- Roy M. Rogison is hired as Producing Artistic Director, and the Playhouse begins producing its own shows, Children's Theatre Program Begins

2000- John Lane dies

2006- Bradford T. Kenney becomes Executive Artistic Director, Season expands from 10 week to 21 week season

2012- Ogunquit Playhouse celebrates its 80th season featuring- Always, Patsy Cline, 9 to 5, South Pacific, Damn Yankees, Ballroom With a Twist, and Buddy-The Buddy Holly Story

2022- Ogunquit Playhouse celebrates its 90th season featuring- The Cher Show, The Nutty Professor, Mr. Holland’s Opus, and Beautiful-The Carole King Musical

2023- Deborah Warren becomes Managing Director

2025- Bradford T. Kenney marks his 20th season with the Playhouse

== Past Productions ==
Shows by season for the last 10 seasons:

2014 Season

- Grease, With Mo Gaffney, Directed and Choreographed by DJ Salisbury, May 21-June 21, 2014
- Billy Elliot, Directed by BT McNicholl, June 25-July 26, 2014
- Mary Poppins, Directed by Shaun Kerrison, July 30-August 30, 2014
- The Witches of Eastwick, American Northeast Premiere, Starring Sally Struthers, Directed by Shaun Kerrison, September 3-September 27, 2014
- The Addams Family, Directed and Choreographed by Keith Andrews, October 1-October 26, 2014
- Mary Poppins (At The Music Hall in Portsmouth, NH), Directed by Shaun Kerrison

2015 Season

- Sister Act, Directed by Steven Beckler, May 20-June 20, 2015
- Victor/Victoria, Directed by Matt Lenz, June 24-July 18, 2015
- Nice Work If You Can Get It, with Sally Struthers and Brenda Vaccaro, Directed by Larry Raben, July 22-August 15, 2015
- Million Dollar Quartet, Directed by Hunter Foster, August 19-September 19
- Saturday Night Fever, Directed by Keith Andrews, September 23-October 25
- White Christmas (At The Music Hall in Portsmouth, NH), Directed by Jayme McDaniel, December 9-December 20, 2015

2016 Season

- Let It Be: A Celebration of the Music of the Beatles, Directed by Daniel A. Weiss, May 18-June 11, 2016
- Anything Goes, With Andrea McArdle and Sally Struthers, Directed by Jaymie McDaniel, June 15-July 9, 2016
- The Hunchback of Notre Dame, With Paolo Montalban and F. Michael Haynie, Directed by Shaun Kerrison, July 13-August 6, 2016
- Priscilla, Queen of the Desert, Directed by David Ruttura, August 10-September 3, 2016
- Million Dollar Quartet, Directed by Hunter Foster, October 5- November 6, 2016
- Disney’s Beauty and the Beast (At The Music Hall in Portsmouth, NH), Directed by Sam Scalamoni, November 30- December 18, 2016

2017 Season

- Mamma Mia!, With Patrick Cassidy and Angie Schworer, Directed by Larry Raben, May 17-July 1, 2017
- Bullets Over Broadway, With Sally Struthers and Vincent Pastore, Directed and Choreographed by Jeff Whiting, July 5- July 29, 2017
- Ragtime, With Klea Blackhurst, Directed by Seth Skylar-Heyn, August 2-August 26, 2017
- Heartbreak Hotel, World Premiere, Written and Directed by Floyd Mutrux, August 30-September 30, 2017
- From Here to Eternity, North American Premiere, With Robyn Hurder, Directed and Choreographed by Brett Smock, October 4-October 29, 2017
- White Christmas (At The Music Hall in Portsmouth, NH), With Sally Struthers, Directed by Jaymie McDaniel, November 29-December 17, 2017

2018 Season

- Smokey Joe’s Cafe, With Kyle Taylor Parker and Jelani Remy, Directed and Choreographed by Joshua Bergasse, May 16- June 9, 2018
- Oklahoma!, Directed by Fred Hanson, June 13-July 7, 2018
- An American in Paris, With Clyde Alves, Directed and Choreographed by Jeffry Denman, July 11-August 4, 2018
- Grumpy Old Men, American Premiere, With Sally Struthers and Hal Linden, Directed by Matt Lenz, August 8-September 1, 2018
- Jersey Boys, With Jonathan Mousset, Directed by Holly-Anne Palmer, September 5-October 28
- Elf The Musical (At The Music Hall in Portsmouth, NH), With Jennifer Cody, Directed and Choreographed by Connor Gallagher, November 28-December 16, 2018

2019 Season

- Jersey Boys, With Jonathan Mousset, Directed by Holly-Anne Palmer, May 15-June 15, 2019
- 42nd Street, With Rachel York, Directed and Choreographed by Randy Skinner, June 19-July 13, 2019
- Cabaret, With John Rubinstein, Directed by BT McNicholl, July 17-August 10, 2019
- Agatha Christie’s Murder on the Orient Express, With Kate Loprest, Directed by Shaun Kerrison, August 14-August 31, 2019
- Menopause The Musical, With Cindy Williams, September 4-September 14, 2019
- Kinky Boots, With Kyle Taylor Parker, Directed by Nathan Peck, September 18- October 27, 2019
- Annie (At The Music Hall in Portsmouth, NH) With Sally Struthers and Angie Schworer, Directed by James A. Rocco, November 27- December 22, 2019

2020 Season

- Playhouse Patio Cabaret, Outdoor concert series featuring Playhouse stars
- Broadway Gives Back to the Playhouse (Streaming Event)
- A Very Brady Musical (Streaming Benefit Event), With Gavin Lee, Kerry Butler, and Klea Blackhurst, Directed by Richard Israel, Wednesday October 28, 2020

2021 Season

All took place in the Leary Pavilion

- Spamalot, With Charles Shaughnessy and Jennifer Cody, Directed by BT McNicholl, June 16- July 10, 2021
- Escape to Margaritaville, Regional Premiere, With Cailen Fu and Megan Kane, Directed by Richard J. Hinds, July 14- August 28, 2021
- Mystic Pizza, World Premiere, With Krystina Alabado, Gianna Yanelli, and Kyra Kennedy, Directed by Casey Hushion, September 1- October 2, 2021
- Young Frankenstein, With Sally Struthers, John Bolton, and Hannah Cruz, Directed by Jeff Whiting, October 6-October 31, 2021
- Playhouse Patio Cabaret, Outdoor concert series featuring Playhouse stars

2022 Season

- The Cher Show, Regional Premiere, With Sara Gettlefinger, David Engel, and Angie Schworer, Directed by Gerry McIntyre, May 12-June 25, 2022
- The Nutty Professor, World Premiere, With Dan DeLuca, Klea Blackhurst, and Jeff McCarthy, Directed by Marc Bruni, July 1-August 6, 2022
- Mr. Holland’s Opus, World Premiere, With Akron Watson, Anastasia Barzee, and Veanne Cox, Directed by BD Wong, August 13- September 10, 2022
- Beautiful- The Carole King Musical, Regional Premiere, With Sarah Bockel, Ben Jacoby, and Anthony Festa, Directed by David Ruttura, September 15- October 30, 2022
- Elf The Musical (at The Music Hall in Portsmouth), With Steven Booth and Diana Huey, November 20- December 18, 2022

2023 Season

- Million Dollar Quartet (at The Music Hall in Portsmouth), With Daniel Durston, Scott Moreau, and Nat Zegree, Directed by Hunter Foster, March 22- April 9, 2023
- Beautiful- The Carole King Musical, With Sarah Bockel, Ben Jacoby, and Matthew Amira, Directed by David Ruttura, May 11-June 10, 2023
- Singin’ in the Rain, With Max Clayton, Christian Probst, and Kate Loprest, Directed by Jaymie McDaniel, June 15-July 15, 2023.
- On Your Feet! The Story of Emilio and Gloria Estefan, The New International Production, With Gaby Albo, Directed by Luis Salgado, July 20-August 19, 2023
- The Da Vinci Code, World Premiere, With Michael Urie, Hannah Cruz, and Charles Shaughnessy, Directed by Leigh Toney, August 24-September 23, 2023
- Tootsie, Regional Premiere, With Dan DeLuca, Sally Struthers, Reed Campbell, and Jennifer Cody, Directed by Larry Raben, September 28-October 29, 2023
- The Sound of Music (at The Music Hall in Portsmouth), With Emilie Kouatchou, Barrett Foa, Elizabeth Teeter, and Kate Loprest, Directed by Anthony C. Daniel, November 29-December 17, 2023

2024 Season

- Waitress, Regional Premiere, With Desi Oakley, Ben Jacoby, and Cleavant Derricks, Directed by Abbey O’Brien, Choreographed by Cost n’ Mayor, May 9-June 8, 2024
- Crazy For You, With Max Clayton, Sally Struthers, and Taylor Aronson, Directed by Angelique Ilo, June 13-July 13, 2024
- A Little Night Music, With Kathleen Turner, Julia Murney, and Nik Walker, Directed by Hunter Foster, July 18-August 17, 2024
- Little Shop of Horrors, With Latrice Royale, Talia Suskauer, and Etai Benson, Directed by Hunter Foster, August 22-September 21, 2024
- My Best Friend’s Wedding, World Premiere, With Krystal Joy Brown, Matt Doyle, and Lianah Sta. Ana, Directed by Kathleen Marshall, September 26-October 27, 2024
- Disney’s Frozen the Broadway Musical (at The Music Hall in Portsmouth), With Cate Hayman and Marilyn Caserta, Directed by Angelique Ilo, November 27-December 22, 2024

=== 2025 Season ===
- Come From Away, With Mary Kate Morrissey, Directed and Choreographed by Richard J. Hinds, May 15-June 14, 2025.
- Guys and Dolls, With Rob McClure, Ephraim Sykes, and Bianca Marroquin, Directed and Choreographed by Al Blackstone, June 19-July 19, 2025.
- High Society, With Robyn Hurder, Bryan Batt, and Sara Gettelfinger, Directed by Matt Lenz, July 24-August 23, 2025
- When Elvis Met The Beatles, World Premiere, Directed by Hunter Foster, August 28-September 27, 2025
- Titanic The Musical, With Wesley Taylor and Charles Shaughnessy, Directed by Shaun Kerrison, October 2-November 2, 2025

2026 Season

- Ain't Too Proud- The Life and Times of the Temptations, Directed by Gerry McIntyre and Choreographed by Rachelle Rak, May 14-June 13, 2026.
- Hello Dolly, with Beth Leavel, Matt Doyle and Ruthie Ann Miles. Directed by Maggie Burrows and Choreographed by William Carlos Angulo, June 18-July 18, 2026.
- City of Angels, Directed by Hunter Foster and Choreographed by Jenn Rias, July 23-August 22, 2026.
- The Producers, Directed and Choreographed by James Gray, August 27-September 26, 2026.
- Small Town, World Premiere John Mellencamp Musical, Directed and Choreographed by Kathleen Marshall, October 1-November 1, 2026.

== Notable performers ==
Performers who have appeared at the Ogunquit Playhouse include the following:

- Clyde Alves – Jerry Mulligan in An American in Paris (2018)
- Ethel Barrymore
- Anastasia Barzee – Mrs. Wilkinson in Billy Elliot the Musical (2014), Iris Holland in Mr. Holland's Opus (2022)
- Bryan Batt- Uncle Willie in High Society (2025)
- Klea Blackhurst – Miss Lemon in The Nutty Professor (2022)
- John Bolton – Dr. Frederick Frankenstein in Young Frankenstein (2013), Dr. Frederick Frankenstein in Young Frankenstein (2021)
- Krystal Joy Brown – Julianne Potter in My Best Friend's Wedding (2024)
- Max Clayton- Don Lockwood in Singin' In The Rain (2023), Bobby Child in Crazy For You (2024), C.K. Dexter Haven in High Society (2025)
- Jennifer Cody – Joy in Cinderella (2006), Natalie Haller in All Shook Up (2009), Gloria Thorpe in Damn Yankees (The Boston Red Sox Version) (2012), Patsy in Monty Python's Spamalot (2021), Sandy Lester in Tootsie (2023)
- Veanne Cox – Helen Chae-Jacobs in Mr. Holland's Opus (2022)
- Bette Davis
- Bradley Dean – Claude Frollo in The Hunchback of Notre Dame (2016), Lt. Dana Holmes in From Here to Eternity (2017)
- Jeffry Denman – Bobby Child in Crazy for You (2007), Sir Robin in Monty Python's Spamalot (2010), Phil Davis in White Christmas (2015), Rooster Hannigan in Annie (2019)
- Cleavant Derricks – Joe in Waitress (2024), General Waverly in White Christmas (2025)
- Ed Dixon – Max Goldman in Grumpy Old Men (2018)
- Matt Doyle – Michael O'Neal in My Best Friend's Wedding (2024)
- Andrew Durand- Mike Connor in High Society (2025)
- David Engel – Gomez Addams in The Addams Family (2014), Harry Bright in Mamma Mia! (2017), Bob Mackie / Frank / Robert Altman in The Cher Show (2022)
- Georgia Engel – Mrs. Tottendale in The Drowsy Chaperone (2010)
- Hunter Foster – Jerry Lukowski in The Full Monty (2007)
- Charlie Franklin- George Kittredge in High Society (2025) & Harold Bride in Titanic the Musical (2025)
- Sara Gettelfinger – Alexandra Spofford in The Witches of Eastwick (2014), Star in The Cher Show (2022), Margaret Lord in High Society (2025)
- Josh Grisetti – Sir Robin in Monty Python's Spamalot (2021)
- Valerie Harper – Millicent Winter in Nice Work If You Can Get It (2015)
- Adrianna Hicks- Betty Haynes in White Christmas (2025)
- Robyn Hurder – Norma Cassidy in Victor/Victoria (2015) & Karen Holmes in From Here to Eternity (2017), Tracy Lord in High Society (2025)
- Mark Jacoby – John Gustafson in Grumpy Old Men (2018)
- Zachary James – The Monster in Young Frankenstein (2021)
- Tim Jerome – Alfred P. Doolittle in My Fair Lady (2008)
- Mel Johnson Jr. – Harrington Winslow in The Nutty Professor (2022)
- Van Johnson
- Kennedy Kanagawa- Ogie in Waitress (2024) & Harold Bride in Titanic the Musical (2025)
- Richard Kind – Nathan Detroit in Guys and Dolls (2009)
- Carson Kressley – The Man in Chair in The Drowsy Chaperone (2010), Mr. Applegate in Damn Yankees (The Boston Red Sox Version) (2012)
- Lorenzo Lamas – The King of Siam in The King and I (2007), Zach in A Chorus Line (2009)
- Liz Larsen – Miss Adelaide in Guys and Dolls (2009), The Drowsy Chaperone in The Drowsy Chaperone (2010)
- Telly Leung – George Downes in My Best Friend's Wedding (2024)
- Hal Linden – Grandpa Gustafson in Grumpy Old Men (2018)
- Myrna Loy
- Jefferson Mays – Henry Higgins in My Fair Lady (2008)
- Andrea McArdle – Sally Bowles in Cabaret (2006), Fantine in Les Misérables (2008), Reno Sweeney in Anything Goes (2016)
- Jeff McCarthy – Dr. Warfield in The Nutty Professor (2022)
- Rue McClanahan – Mother in Crazy for You (2007)
- Rob McClure- Nathan Detroit in Guys and Dolls (2025)
- Eddie Mekka – Wilbur Turnblad in Hairspray (2007), Tevye in Fiddler on the Roof (2008)
- Paolo Montalban – The Prince in Cinderella (2006), Lun Tha in The King and I (2007), Clopin in The Hunchback of Notre Dame (2016)
- Mary Kate Morrissey- Beverly Bass in Come From Away (2025)
- Julia Murney – Desiree Armfeldt in A Little Night Music (2024)
- Christiane Noll – Winifred Banks in Mary Poppins (2014)
- Desi Oakley – Jenna Hunterson in Waitress (2024)
- Chris Orbach – Bill Meister in Mr. Holland's Opus (2022)
- Vincent Pastore – Nick Valenti in Bullets Over Broadway (2017)
- Stefanie Powers – Norma Desmond in Sunset Boulevard (2010)
- William Powell
- Latrice Royale – Audrey II in Little Shop of Horrors (2024)
- John Rubinstein – Herr Schultz in Cabaret (2019)
- Gabrielle Ruiz – Anita in West Side Story (2013)
- Michael Rupert – Professor Callahan in Legally Blonde (2011)
- Angie Schworer – Irene Roth in Crazy for You (2007), Roxie Hart in Chicago (2010), Tanya in Mamma Mia! (2017), Lily St. Regis in Annie (2019), Georgia Holt / Lucille Ball in The Cher Show (2022), Irene Roth in Crazy for You (2024)
- Peter Scolari – Harold Hill in The Music Man (2011)
- Rashidra Scott as Alice Bean in Titanic the Musical (2025)
- Keala Settle – The Narrator in Joseph and the Amazing Technicolor Dreamcoat (2013)
- Charles Shaughnessy – King Arthur in Monty Python's Spamalot (2010), King Arthur in Monty Python's Spamalot (2021)
- Kate Shindle – Sally Bowles in Cabaret (2019)
- Rex Smith – Captain Georg von Trapp in The Sound of Music (2010)
- Dale Soules – Grandma in Billy Elliot the Musical (2014)
- Edward Staudenmayer – Del Delmonico in Breaking Up Is Hard to Do (2008), Franklin Hart in 9 to 5 (2012)
- Sally Struthers – Mona Stangley in The Best Little Whorehouse in Texas (2005), Miss Dolly Gallagher Levi in Hello, Dolly! (2006), Jeanette Burmeister in The Full Monty (2007), Golde in Fiddler on the Roof (2008), Mayor Matilda Hyde in All Shook Up (2009), Matron "Mama" Morton in Chicago (2010), Paulette Buonufonte in Legally Blonde (2011), Louise Seger in Always, Patsy Cline (2012), Roz in 9 to 5 (2012), Mrs. Meers in Thoroughly Modern Millie (2013), Felicia Gabriel in The Witches of Eastwick (2014), Duchess Estonia Dulworth in Nice Work If You Can Get It (2015), Evangeline Harcourt in Anything Goes (2016), Eden Brent in Bullets Over Broadway (2017), Martha Watson in White Christmas (2017), Punky Olander in Grumpy Old Men (2018), Maggie Jones in 42nd Street (2019), Miss Hanningan in Annie (2019), Frau Blucher in Young Frankenstein (2021), Rita Marshall in Tootsie (2023), Mother in Crazy for You (2024), Martha Watson in White Christmas (2025)
- Talia Suskauer – Audrey in Little Shop of Horrors (2024)
- Ephraim Sykes- Sky Masterson in Guys and Dolls (2025)
- Renée Taylor – Esther in Breaking Up Is Hard to Do (2008)
- Wesley Taylor- J. Bruce Ismay in Titanic The Musical (2025)
- Kathleen Turner – Madame Armfeldt in A Little Night Music (2024)
- Leslie Uggams – The Fairy Godmother in Cinderella (2006)
- Brenda Vaccaro – Millicent Winter in Nice Work If You Can Get It (2015)
- Nik Walker – Count Carl-Magnus Malcolm in A Little Night Music (2024)
- Cindy Williams – Hostess in Menopause The Musical (2019)
- Rachel York – The Lady of the Lake in Monty Python's Spamalot (2010), Dorothy Brock in 42nd Street (2019)
