= My Best Friend's Wedding (disambiguation) =

My Best Friend's Wedding is a 1997 American film.

My Best Friend's Wedding may also refer to:

- My Best Friend's Wedding (2016 film), a Chinese remake of the 1997 film
- My Best Friend's Wedding (musical), a 2024 musical stage adaptation of the 1997 film

== Television episodes ==
- "My Best Friend's Wedding" (The Drew Carey Show)
- "My Best Friend's Wedding" (Felicity)
- "My Best Friend's Wedding" (Grosse Pointe)
- "My Best Friend's Wedding" (Jesse)
- "My Best Friend's Wedding" (Scrubs)

== See also ==
- "My Best Friend's Weddings", a 2020 song by the Chicks from Gaslighter
- Mere Yaar Ki Shaadi Hai (lit. It's My Friend's Wedding), a 2002 Indian Hindi-language film partly adapted from the 1997 film
