= William C. Rader =

American self published author

- Born: 1938 (age 87–88)
- Education: State University of New York (M.D., 1967)
- Occupation: Psychiatrist
- Spouse: Sally Struthers (m. 1977; div. 1983)
- Children: 4

William C. Rader (born 1938) is an American psychiatrist. After an early career treating eating disorders, he founded several offshore clinics administering injections of human fetal stem cells claiming clinically-unproven therapeutic benefits for a variety of illnesses. Rader's assertions about the effectiveness of his injections, coupled with high-pressure sales tactics, aroused intense criticism. Complaints by patients led to the revocation of his medical license in California.

== Biography ==
Rader graduated with an M.D. from the State University of New York in 1967. He did his psychiatric fellowship at the University of Southern California Medical Center. He was a psychiatrist for the Navy's alcoholism treatment program from 1971 to 1973.

Rader was married and had three children prior to marrying Sally Struthers, with whom he had a daughter. He co-wrote a 1977 episode of the television sitcom All in the Family and became involved with Struthers' negotiations with television executives. The couple divorced on January 18, 1983 in Los Angeles. He also served as a consultant for the 1977 CBS tv special Intimate Strangers, which starred Struthers and which also notably exposed the issue of spousal abuse to an American television audience.

Rader was a medical expert for KABC Eyewitness News in Los Angeles from 1977 to 1991. Newsweek described Rader as "a highly telegenic Beverly Hills psychiatrist" and called his five-part debut on KABC about compulsive overeating "riveting". In 1981, Rader published a book titled No Diet Program For Permanent Weight Loss. In 1984 he started The Rader Institute to treat eating disorders.

In 1992, he started the Survivor Program to help victims of sexual abuse. He founded the Immune Suppressed Institute in 1993, an HIV/AIDS treatment center, in Mexico City.

=== Stem cells ===
Rader first observed the human injection of fetal stem cells in the mid-1990s at a Ukrainian clinic. In 1995, he began referring his own US patients to Ukraine for fetal stem cell treatment. Rader's first independent stem cell clinic was established in the Bahamas; the clinic reopened in the Dominican Republic after the Bahamian government asked Rader to leave in 2000 following a critical television report aired in the United States.

Rader operated multiple stem cell marketing entities over the years including The Dulcinea Institute, Medra, Inc., and Stem Cell of America, Inc., continuing to maintain the latter's website and California office after he lost his medical license.

In 2008, Rader claimed in a telephone interview that his stem cell product was obtained from a laboratory in the Republic of Georgia. Rader has never published studies or results of his treatments in medical journals. In 2009, the journal Science called Rader "particularly notorious" among unregulated offshore stem cell providers for his "extraordinary claims" and "refus[al] to share information on cell lines and techniques."

Rader, who uses the same stem cell treatment no matter what the patient's ailment, said of his injection process, "I'm not telling a cell where to go, because I have no clue where it should go. This is nature, God's work. Whatever you want to call it." Dr. Evan Snyder, director of stem cell research at the Sanford-Burnham Medical Research Institute in La Jolla, California, responded, "[t]hat's not a therapy, that's snake oil." In 2009, the BBC's current affairs program Panorama aired an episode in which it investigated claims of Rader's high-pressure sales tactics. Rader has stated that he charges $30,000 for an initial treatment with significant discounts for follow-up injections. In 2010, Rader self-published another book titled Blocked in the USA: The Stem Cell Miracle.

=== Revocation of medical license ===
On November 5, 2014 the Medical Board of California revoked Rader's medical license, citing negligence, professional misconduct, and false or misleading advertising. "His dishonesty permeates every aspect of his business and practices", the Board concluded. Rader was unsuccessfully defended before the Board by attorney Robert Shapiro.

No longer permitted to advertise himself as Stem Cell of America's "medical director", Rader began calling himself "chief scientist" acting as the "PR person representing the company", and continued to market stem cell injections administered one day a month under the supervision of a local anesthesiologist in Tijuana, Mexico. Prospective patients must sign a form pledging not to discuss their treatments online or with the media. When asked by the Los Angeles Times in May 2015 for the name of the Mexican anesthesiologist currently serving as his company's medical director, Rader said he could not recall his full name. It is illegal in Mexico to sell experimental treatments or operate without government permission.
