= Bess Houdini =

Stage assistant and wife of Harry Houdini (1876–1943)

- Houdini in the early 1900s
- Born: Wilhelmina Beatrice Rahner; January 23, 1876; Brooklyn, New York, U.S.
- Died: February 11, 1943 (aged 67); Needles, California, U.S.
- Resting place: Gate of Heaven Cemetery, Hawthorne, New York, U.S.
- Spouse: Harry Houdini (m. 1894; died 1926)

Wilhelmina Beatrice "Bess" Houdini (née Rahner; January 23, 1876 – February 11, 1943) was an American stage assistant and wife of Harry Houdini.

== Biography ==
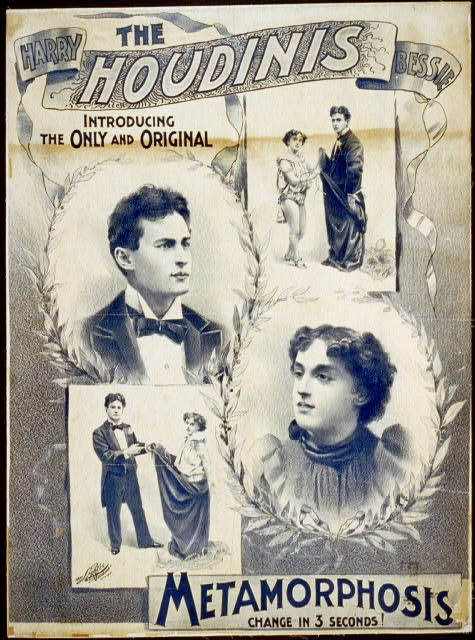
1895 poster for The Houdinis

Wilhelmina Beatrice Rahner was born in Brooklyn, New York, in 1876 to German immigrants Gebhard Rahner (a cabinet maker) and Balbina Rahner (née Bugel).

Bess was working at Coney Island in a song and dance act called The Floral Sisters when she was first courted by Houdini's younger brother, Theo (a.k.a. Theodore Hardeen). However, after Theo introduced them one evening, it was the older Houdini brother, Harry, that she fell in love with and married on June 22, 1894. The pair worked as The Houdinis for several years before Houdini hit it big as The Handcuff King. Although it has never been proven, many have speculated that Bess delivered a lock pick to Harry orally by kissing him during his act. He and Bess continued to occasionally perform their signature trick, Metamorphosis, throughout his career. Bess also looked after their menagerie of pets, collected dolls, and made the costumes for Houdini's full evening roadshow. The Houdinis remained childless throughout their marriage. Bess's niece, Marie Hinson Blood, said Bess suffered from a medical condition that prevented her from having children.

After Houdini died on October 31, 1926, Bess opened a tea house in New York, and briefly performed a vaudeville act in which she froze a man in ice.

She moved to Inwood, Manhattan, and would try to contact Harry during seances, with a code that only the two of them knew about, to be sure that the spirit medium was not a fraud. The code was: "Rosabelle – answer – tell – pray answer – look – tell – answer answer – tell."

"Rosabelle" was the name of the song Bess sang in her act when they first met, and the word was also inscribed inside her wedding band. The other words correspond to elements of the secret spelling code they had devised to pass information during a mentalism act, with suitable pauses between cues. Each word or word pair equals a letter: A (or 1) was represented by PRAY, B (2) by ANSWER, C (3) by SAY, D by NOW, E by TELL, F by PLEASE, G by SPEAK, H by QUICKLY, I by LOOK and J (number 10, or 0 in combination) by BE QUICK. So the word "answer" on its own indicated "B", while the 22nd letter of the alphabet ("V") was represented by "answer answer". Hence the Houdinis' secret phrase spelled out the word "BELIEVE".

In the 1930s she moved to Hollywood, California, and worked to promote Houdini's memory along with her manager and partner, Edward Saint. On Halloween 1936, Bess and Saint conducted a "Final Houdini Séance" on the roof of the Knickerbocker Hotel in Hollywood. At the conclusion of the failed séance, beside a photograph of Houdini, she put out the candle that was said to have burned for ten years. In 1943 she said "ten years [was] long enough to wait for any man."

After the 1936 séance, Bess asked Walter B. Gibson—writer of the mystery series The Shadow and a friend, confidant, publicist and ghostwriter for Houdini—to carry on the yearly tribute. He held them for many years at New York's Magic Towne House with such magical notables as Houdini biographer Milbourne Christopher. Before he died, Gibson passed on the tradition to Dorothy Dietrich.

Bess Houdini died from a heart attack on February 11, 1943, while in Needles, California, aboard an eastbound train traveling from Los Angeles to New York City. She was 67 years old. Her family would not allow her to be interred with her late husband at the Machpelah Cemetery in Queens, New York, as she had been raised a Roman Catholic and he was a Jew. The cemetery also forbids non-Jews from being buried there. She is interred instead at Gate of Heaven Cemetery in Hawthorne, New York.

== Houdini in popular culture ==
=== In film ===
Bess Houdini appeared as herself in the 1938 film Religious Racketeers (a.k.a. Mystic Circle Murder) directed by Frank O'Conner and produced by Fanchon Royer. In the film, she expressed her belief that communication with those who have died is impossible. The film sparked controversy among spiritualists, but was praised by magicians. It was released on DVD in 2006 by Alpha Video.

Bess has been portrayed in film by Janet Leigh (Houdini, 1953), Sally Struthers (The Great Houdini, 1976), Stacy Edwards (Houdini, 1998), and Kristen Connolly (Houdini, 2014). On stage, she has been played by Judith Bruce (Man of Magic, 1966), Viviane Thomas (Houdini – A Circus Opera, 1979), Kim Lores (The Great Houdini, 1999), and Evanna Lynch ("Houdini", 2013).

=== In music ===
The Kate Bush song "Houdini" from her 1982 album The Dreaming is about the story of Bess Houdini and her attempts to communicate with her deceased husband Harry.

The My Chemical Romance song "This Is How I Disappear" was inspired by the séance performed by Bess to contact her dead husband, Harry.

Bálint Varga and Lia Barcellona Tamborra's 2020 album musical/audiobook d'Illusion: The Houdini Musical depicts Harry and Bess's relationship as part of the plot. She is portrayed by Quiana Holmes.

== Gallery ==
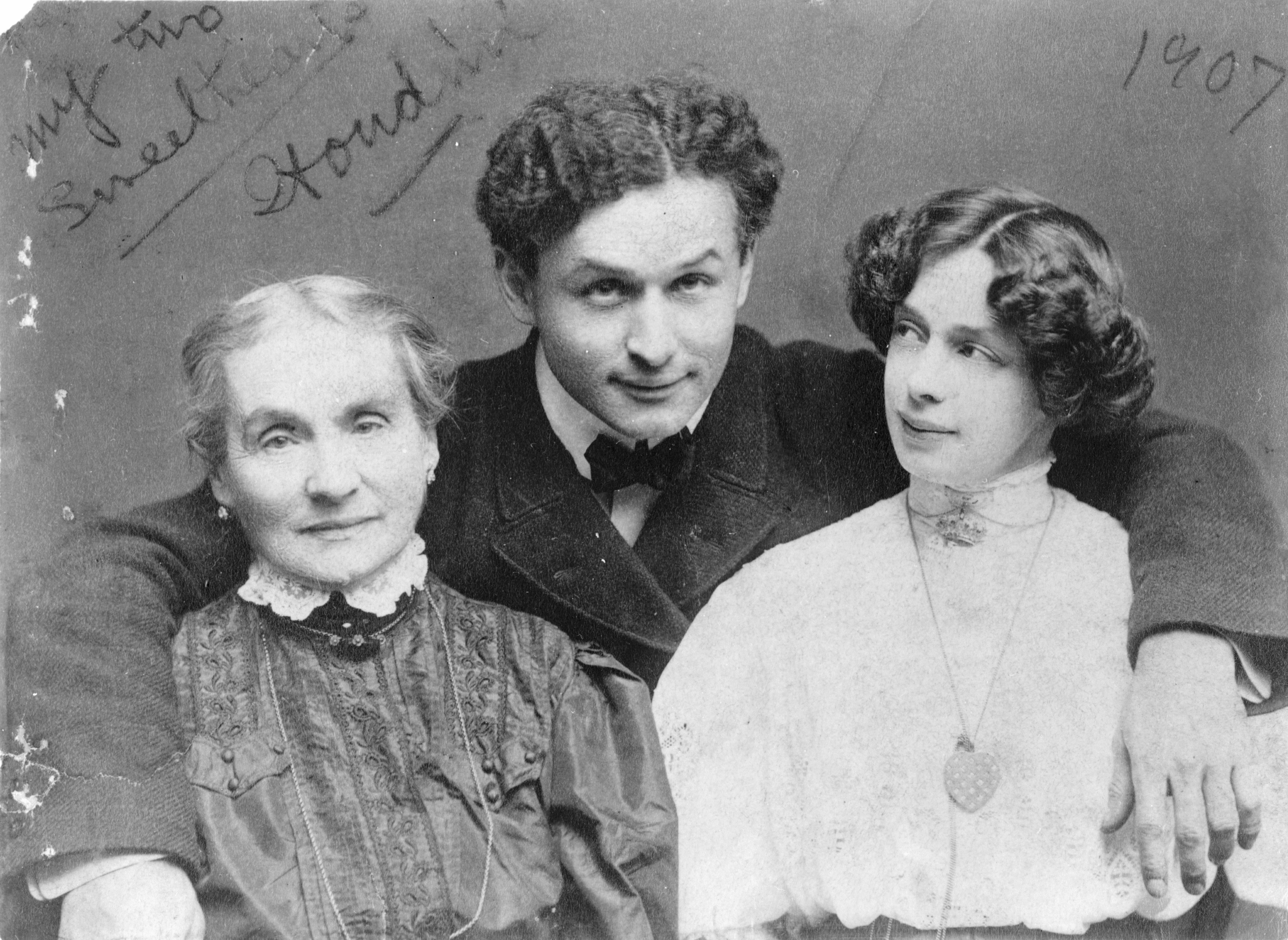
Houdini with his mother and Bess (1907)

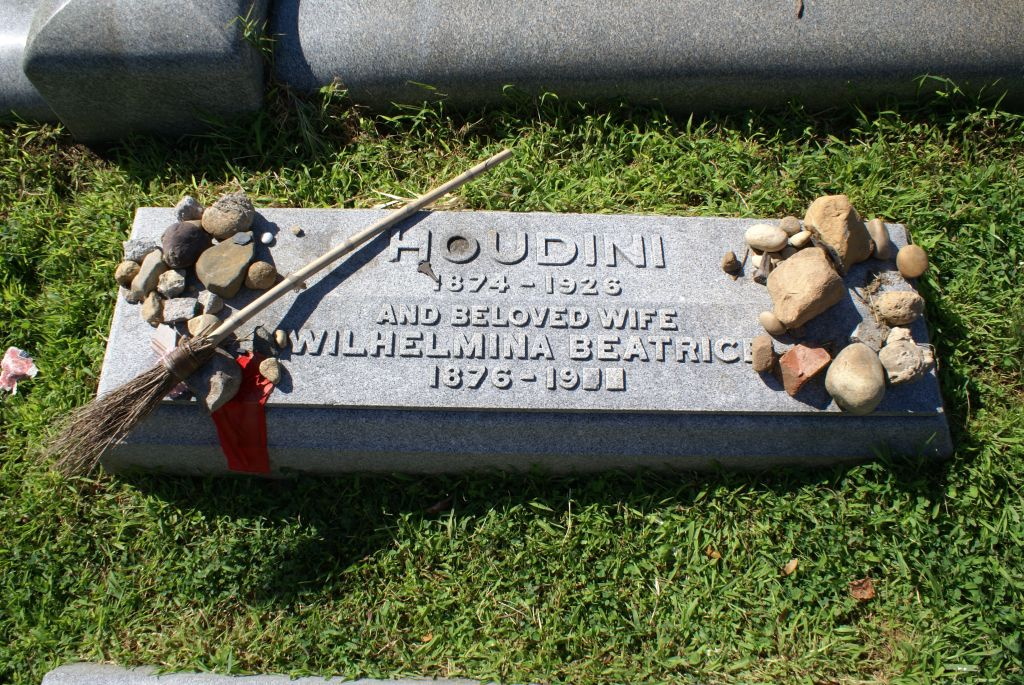
The Houdinis' grave marker at Machpelah Cemetery, Queens

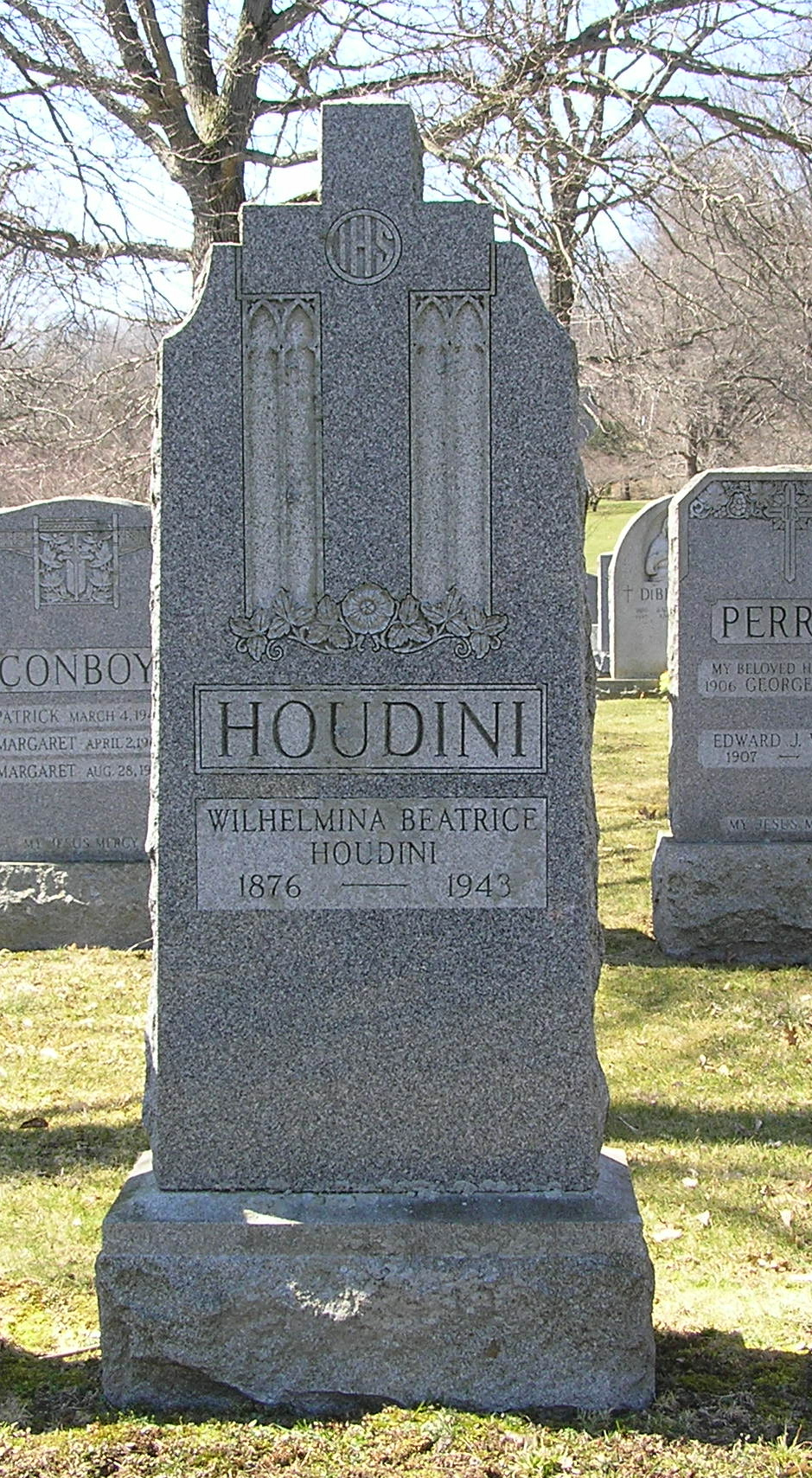
The grave of Bess Houdini in Gate of Heaven Cemetery
