= The Da Vinci Code (play) =

Play by Dan Brown

- Original language: English
- Written by: Rachel Wagstaff; Duncan Abel
- Based on: The Da Vinci Code by Dan Brown
- Genre: Mystery thriller

Premiere
- Date: 10 January 2022
- Place: Churchill Theatre, Bromley

The Da Vinci Code is a play based on the 2003 mystery thriller novel of the same name by Dan Brown, adapted by Rachel Wagstaff and Duncan Abel.

== Production history ==
The tour was originally due to start in April 2021, however was postponed. On 1 October 2021, it was announced the play will star Nigel Harman as Robert Langdon, Danny John-Jules as Sir Leigh Teabing and Hannah Rose Caton as Sophie Neveu. The play had its world premiere at the Churchill Theatre, Bromley on 10 January 2022, before touring the United Kingdom. The production was directed by Luke Sheppard. The tour closed early, due to the challenges of touring following the COVID-19 pandemic.

The production made its North American premiere at the Ogunquit Playhouse from August 24 until September 23, 2023 starring Michael Urie, Hannah Cruz and Charles Shaughnessy.

A revised production made its Midwest premiere at Drury Lane Theatre from April 17 until June 1, 2025 starring Jeff Parker, Vaneh Assadourian, and Brad Armacost.

== Cast and characters ==
Character	UK tour (2022)
Robert Langdon	Nigel Harman
Sophie Neveu	Hannah Rose Caton
Sir Leigh Teabing	Danny John-Jules

== Reception ==
Arifa Akbar of The Guardian called it "a decent crack at staging the bestseller".
