= The Great Houdini (film) =

- Also known as: The Great Houdinis
- Genre: Biography; Drama
- Written by: Peter Benchley; Melville Shavelson
- Directed by: Melville Shavelson
- Starring: Paul Michael Glaser; Sally Struthers
- Theme music composer: Peter Matz
- Country of origin: United States
- Original language: English

Production
- Production locations: 20th Century Fox Studios - 10201 Pico Blvd., Century City, Los Angeles, California
- Cinematography: Arch R. Dalzell
- Editor: John Woodcock
- Running time: 96 minutes
- Production company: ABC Circle Films

Original release
- Network: ABC
- Release: October 8, 1976

The Great Houdinis a.k.a. The Great Houdini is a 1976 American made-for-television biographical film which is a fictionalized account of the life of the Hungarian-American escape artist and entertainer Harry Houdini. The film was written and directed by Melville Shavelson and features Paul Michael Glaser (Starsky & Hutch) and Sally Struthers (All in the Family) and originally aired on ABC on October 8, 1976.

== Overview ==
The movie features the early career of Houdini, the relationship between his wife and mother, and his and his wife's attempts to reach "the other side,” with him attempting to contact his deceased mother and her attempting to contact Houdini himself after his death. Although the film portrays a strained relationship between Houdini's wife and mother, in reality they got along relatively well.

Some notable performances were turned in by Vivian Vance as Bess Houdini's nurse (and the narrator), Ruth Gordon as Houdini's mother, Peter Cushing as Sir Arthur Conan Doyle, and Bill Bixby as Rev. Arthur Ford.

When the film was rebroadcast on April 6, 1977, the title was changed to The Great Houdini.

== Cast ==
- Paul Michael Glaser as Harry Houdini (Erich Weiss)
- Sally Struthers as Bess Houdini
- Ruth Gordon as Cecilia Weiss
- Vivian Vance as Minnie (Nurse), the narrator
- Adrienne Barbeau as Daisy White
- Bill Bixby as Rev. Arthur Ford
- Jack Carter as Theo Weiss
- Peter Cushing as Sir Arthur Conan Doyle
- Nina Foch as Rev. Le Veyne
- Wilfrid Hyde-White as Supt. Melville
- Geoffrey Lewis as Dr. Crandon
- Maureen O'Sullivan as Lady Conan Doyle
- Clive Revill as Dundas Slater
