= Grumpy Old Men (musical) =

Musical based on the film of the same name

Grumpy Old Men: The Musical
- Music: Neil Berg
- Lyrics: Nick Meglin
- Book: Dan Remmes
- Basis: Warner Bros. film Grumpy Old Men by Mark Steven Johnson Orchestrations by Larry Hochman; Additional orchestrations by Phil Reno

Grumpy Old Men: The Musical is a stage musical with book by Dan Remmes songs composed by Neil Berg and lyrics by Nick Meglin. The music was orchestrated by Larry Hochman with additional orchestrations by Phil Reno. It is based on the 1993 Warner Bros. film Grumpy Old Men by Mark Steven Johnson which starred Jack Lemmon, Walter Matthau and Ann-Margret. It tells the story of two childhood friends, John Gustafson and Max Goldman, now aging neighbors. An old grudge resurfaces when a mysterious woman moves in across the street.

The musical premiered in the United States at the storied Ogunquit Playhouse in Ogunquit, Maine in 2018. Its West Coast premiere was in Southern California at the La Mirada Theatre for the Performing Arts in 2019. Both premiere productions were directed by Matt Lenz and choreographed by Michele Lynch.

== Synopsis ==
The play is set in the small town of Wabasha, Minnesota. Next-door neighbors John Gustafson and Max Goldman keep up a decades-old feud, stemming from when John married May, whom Max was also courting. Now widowers, they spend their days ice fishing and insulting each other. Other townspeople include John's 90-year-old father; Chuck, the owner of the local bait shop; his odd cousin Punky who has just moved in with him; and accident-prone mailman Harry.

Both men are lonely since the passing of their wives. John is in trouble with the IRS, owing $18,000 in back taxes and $96,000 in penalties. He's forced to sell his beloved piano to raise money. His daughter, Melanie, has separated from her husband. When John insists that she move in with him, she lies and says she's already engaged to Max's son Jacob, a local attorney. The entire town, including the fathers, is delighted with the news. Melanie and Jacob go along with the charade, as they secretly harbor feelings for each other.

Ariel Truax, a well-traveled and cosmopolitan widow, moves into the home across the street. Both Max and John spy on her, but rebuff her attempts at friendship. They spy Chuck spending Thanksgiving with her, who later chastizes the men for being afraid of Ariel. Chuck dies in his sleep shortly afterwards, leaving his store and house to Punky, a fishing trophy to Max, and the lock box that he stored his retirement savings in to John.

Max and John vow to win Ariel's heart. She befriends Max but is smitten with John, who's nervous and awkward after years of living alone. Heartless IRS agent Sandra Snyder tells Max of John's financial troubles and how he's about to lose his house. Max tells her about his inheritance. Ariel and John sleep together and start a relationship. Max is furious, saying that this is the second woman John has stolen a woman from him. John reminds him that his marriage to May was unhappy, while Max's marriage was sound; Max got the better deal. Max reminds John that he won't be able to take care of Ariel when he loses his house. Realizing that John is right, he ends things with Ariel. Meanwhile, Melanine plans to move to California while Jacob is offered a high-paying job in New York.

John tells Max that he broke up with Ariel, but suffers a heart attack. Max realizes how much John means to him. At the hospital, as John's friends keep vigil, Agent Snyder shows up, having confiscated the lock box. She demands Punky unlock it, only to find that Chuck donated his money to the VFW and the box only contains a childhood photo of Max and John. Ariel tells an unresponsive John that she still cares for him and that she doesn't believe he really wanted to end things. He wakes up. Melanie and Jacob admit their mutual attraction and decide to stay in Wabasha.

The following spring, Melanie and Jacob are together, with Jacob running for mayor of the town. John has made a full recovery and is about to marry Ariel, with Max serving as his best man. Ariel surprises John by presenting him with his old piano. Max loans John the $18,000 he needs to pay off the IRS. The penalties were mysteriously forgiven after Snyder spent the night with John's father. John and Ariel get married.

== Conception ==
Grumpy Old Men: The Musical was the brainchild of actor/producer Jeff Gardner. With a goal to produce a Broadway musical, he felt the 1993 film Grumpy Old Men—with its midwestern backdrop and rich emotional story—was well-suited to musical adaptation. Gardner envisioned a traditional Golden Age musical with a strong book and old-style score. Gardner earned a limited option from both Warner Bros., the film's producer, and Mark Steven Johnson, the screenwriter.

To create the music and lyrics, he commissioned Neil Berg, composer of The 12 and off-Broadway musical The Prince and the Pauper, and writer and lyricist Nick Meglin, the multi-decade editor of MAD Magazine. Berg and Meglin had previously collaborated on an award-winning musical sequel to A Christmas Carol entitled Tim and Scrooge. For the book, Gardner turned to actor and playwright Dan Remmes, best known for his award-winning romantic comedies including Three Tables. Gardner had previously worked with Remmes as producer of his play, Night Out, at the Theater in Old Town, San Diego.

Director Glenn Casale was attached to direct. David Holcenberg served as the original music supervisor.

== Development ==
An unpublicized table read of the first draft took place in North Hollywood, Los Angeles in 2007. It featured George Hearn and Len Cariou in roles of John and Max, Adrienne Barbeau as Ariel, Charles Durning as Grandpa, Garrett Morris as Chuck, Vicki Lewis as IRS agent Snyder (in a gender reversal from the movie) and Carol Kane in the role of Punky, a new character Remmes created specifically for the musical.

Subsequent invitation-only industry readings in New York City featured many of the same actors as the Hollywood table read in addition to (in various combinations) F. Murray Abraham, Christopher Lloyd, John Schuck, Marilu Henner, Ken Page and Joshua Malina.

== World premiere ==
In 2011, the Royal Manitoba Theatre Centre in Winnipeg, Canada offered to provide a world premiere mainstage production. The season slot available conflicted with the schedule of director Glenn Casale. Producer Gardner opted to seize the opportunity and proceed without Casale.

Director Bill Castellino was chosen to step in. Elizabeth Baird served as musical director. John MacInnis choreographed. Budget constraints required contractual and creative concessions from all three writers. It also prevented composer Neil Berg and lyricist Nick Meglin from attending rehearsals. Book-writer Dan Remmes was financed to attend a portion of rehearsals.

Castellino applied his own vision to the expedited production, which starred John Rubinstein and John Schuck as John and Max, respectively. (Schuck had previously portrayed Grandpa in developmental readings.) Arial was portrayed by Susan Anton with Ken Page as Chuck. The score was orchestrated by Larry Hochman. The supporting roles were cast from a pool of Canadian actors, largely Toronto-based. Without Berg or Meglin present, and with Remmes on site only part of the time, the show was hastily modified to accommodate the large stage, new cast and replaced director.

The limited engagement ran from October 13 to November 5, 2011.

== 6-year dormancy ==
Following the Canadian production, the producers were drained of development money. The project was indefinitely shelved. Contract options with the writers were not renewed.

Remmes, Berg and Meglin were left in sole legal possession of their script, score and lyrics, which were unmarketable without the subsidiary rights from the 1993 film—contracts that had also expired.

== New life ==
In 2017, six years after the contracts expired, composer Berg—a producer in his own right—yearned to resurrect the show. Partnering with co-writers Remmes and Meglin, they obtained new limited agreements direct from film producer Warner Bros. and screenwriter Johnson.

Minus the constraints of producers and investors, the writing team reconfigured the script, score and lyrics and financed an invitation-only industry reading of the reworked show in New York City. The readings were directed by Nick Corley and music directed by Wendy Bobbitt Cavett. It featured a new cast of Broadway actors, including Lee Wilkof as Max, John Hillner as John, Luba Mason as Ariel and Didi Conn as Punky.

== Productions ==
=== East Coast premiere ===
TRW chose Ogunquit Playhouse in Ogunquit, Maine to premiere the reworked show in the United States. Matt Lenz directed the Ogunquit production with musical direction by Phil Reno and choreography by Michele Lynch.

Mark Jacoby and Ed Dixon were cast as John and Max respectively. Leslie Stevens portrayed the role Ariel while Doug Eskew was cast as Chuck. Brenda Braxton portrayed Snyder, Hal Linden was cast as Grandpa and Ogunquit-favorite Sally Struthers portrayed the role of Punky.

The sold-out run ran from August 8 to September 1, 2018.

=== West Coast premiere ===
In 2019, the show premiered on the west coast of the United States at the La Mirada Theatre for the Performing Arts in southern California, produced by McCoy Rigby Entertainment. Lenz and Lynch returned as director and choreographer respectively with music direction by Benet Braun.

Reprising their roles from Ogunquit were Mark Jacoby, Leslie Stevens and Hal Linden. Ken Page reprised the role of Chuck from his performance in Winnipeg. Gregory North took over the role of Max and Cathy Rigby played the role of Punky.

The production ran from September 20 to October 13, 2019.

== Critical response ==
Critical response to the two United States east- and west-coast premieres was largely positive.

=== East Coast reaction ===
To the Ogunquit production, Broadway World wrote “Grumpy Old Men the Musical hits the mark right from the start; there's no shortcomings here. With a well written fun script, laced with comic one liners, loveable characters, and a lighthearted musical score, Grumpy Old Men exceeded all my expectations … Everything works extraordinarily well in this premiere production. The story is fun and the characters lively, engaging, and memorable … It has every element of a solid musical that could easily become a favorite of theaters everywhere.”

The Journal Tribune lauded a “cracker-barrel book by Dan Remmes … the musical numbers are creatively coiffed to fit the template of the fast-moving production … sometimes touching, sometimes raucous, all times enticing.” The Portsmouth Herald wrote “Book writer Dan Remmes, along with late lyricist Nick Meglin of MAD Magazine, have crafted a timeless piece of work.” The Independent Reviewers of New England (IRNE Awards) called it an “entertaining inspiration.”

The Theater Mirror (New England Theater Guide) called it “a slap-happy feast.” and the Portland Press Herald labeled it "An extremely funny, warm-hearted romance." The Boston Post-Gazette proclaimed, "The book is great, the score is outstanding … I would be very surprised if this production does not move on to Broadway."

=== West Coast reaction ===
Of the west coast production, Hollywood Progressive wrote “Grumpy’s upbeat music is in the Broadway musical tradition of hits such as, say, The Pajama Game … unexpectedly heartwarming, moving and at all times, highly enjoyable.” The Los Angeles Times demurred, suggesting the result was "a considerable loss of the movie's warmth" while acknowledging it "didn't seem to faze the opening-night audience, which tittered at each scandalous line. The score—a slick Broadway sound echoing pop styles from the 1940s through the '80s—also kept the room energized.” Broadway World Los Angeles wrote that “Neil Berg and Nick Meglin have written some very pretty songs … especially riveting are “I Like the Way Things Are," “Life is All About Livin”—Grandpa's song which reminded me of Grandma's song from Pippin—“An Angel” and “Family or Friend.” And “Dan Remmes’ book keeps the humor at a high level.”

StageScene L.A. proclaimed “Book writer Dan Remmes’ smartest move is in taking the local citizenry and giving them names, occupations and personalities brought to vibrant life ... Add to this composer Neil Berg and lyricist Nick Meglin's bouncy score ... it's a formula that's worked before and works again here like a finely-tuned instrument ... Grumpy Old Men The Musical has exactly what it takes to become a regional theater favorite.” The Whittier Daily News wrote, "When you leave the show, you're likely to want to reach out to someone who means something to you, and let them know that they do." The Show Report wrote, "This grumpy hurrah remains natural and poignant. Much of that credit significantly belongs to scripter Dan Remmes. His compassion in his book for these now well-known characters eschews real sentimentality and provides a certain dignity even amid the ribald banter and utter puerility of the pension-age adolescents … a guilty pleasure of a musical!" and Bucking Trends called it "A highly entertaining, life-affirming, feel-good fiesta of a new show."

== Regional productions ==
In 2019, TRW classified the show as a Premier Title and made licensing available for regional and international productions.
