= Sara Gettelfinger =

American actress and singer (born 1977)

- Born: c. 1977 (age 48–49); Louisville, Kentucky, U.S.
- Education: University of Cincinnati (BFA)
- Occupations: Actress, singer, dancer
- Years active: 1999–present

Sara Gettelfinger (born c. 1977 in Louisville, Kentucky) is an American actress, singer, and dancer.

== Early life and education ==
Gettelfinger was raised in Kentucky and Jeffersonville, Indiana. She graduated from the Youth Performing Arts School at duPont Manual High School in 1995. Gettelfinger studied at the University of Cincinnati College-Conservatory of Music where she earned a BFA in 1999.

== Career ==
Three weeks after moving to New York City, Gettelfinger got her first professional acting role as "April" in the Helen Hayes Theatre Company's production of Stephen Sondheim's Company in Nyack, New York.

Gettelfinger performed in regional theater across the country before being cast in her first Broadway role as "Bird Girl" in the musical Seussical. She subsequently was cast in her first leading Broadway role as "Carla" in the musical Nine with Antonio Banderas.

Gettelfinger originated the role of "Jolene Oakes" in Dirty Rotten Scoundrels, with John Lithgow, Sherie Rene Scott, Gregory Jbara, and Joanna Gleason in 2004. She briefly left the role to play "Little Edie" in the original off-Broadway run of Grey Gardens (replaced by Erin Davie when the show moved to Broadway).

She is also a member of the singing trio Three Graces, which blends the musical styles of its three members' backgrounds: Broadway (Gettelfinger), Opera (Joy Kabanuck), and Pop (Kelly Levesque). Their first public performance was October 29, 2007, at the second annual Cole Porter-Like Salon, a Broadway Cares/Equity Fights AIDS benefit. In early 2008 the group toured the United States, Canada, and Mexico with Paul Potts, stopping in 20 cities. Three Graces released its debut album on March 4, 2008.

Gettelfinger played Morticia Addams in the first national tour of The Addams Family, which ran from September 2011 through December 2012.

== Theatre credits ==
Year	Production	Role	Venue	Category
1999	Company	April	Helen Hayes Theatre Company (Nyack, New York)	Regional
1999–2000	Fosse	Featured performer	First National Tour	National tour
2000	Seussical	Bird Girl; ensemble; understudy for Mayzie LaBird	Richard Rodgers Theatre	Broadway
2000	Anything Goes	Ship's Passenger	Vivian Beaumont Theater	Broadway
2000	Tenderloin	Liz	New York City Center Encores!	Off-Broadway
2000	Pippin	Fastrada	Paper Mill Playhouse	Regional
2001	Lone Star Love	Aggie Ford	Great Lakes Theater (Ohio Theatre)	Regional
2002	The Boys from Syracuse	Courtesan; understudy for Luce	American Airlines Theatre	Broadway
2002	Carnival!	Ensemble; Bluebird Girl; Carnival Person	New York City Center Encores!	Off-Broadway
2003	Nine	Maria; understudy for Carla and Stephanie	Eugene O'Neill Theatre	Broadway
2003	Nine	Carla (replacement for Jane Krakowski)	Eugene O'Neill Theatre	Broadway
2004	Tom Jones	Bridget Allworthy; Lady Bellaston	North Shore Music Theatre	Regional
2004	Dirty Rotten Scoundrels	Jolene Oakes	The Old Globe	Regional
2005	The Secret Garden (concert)	Rose	Manhattan Center	Off-Broadway
2005–2006	Dirty Rotten Scoundrels	Jolene Oakes	Imperial Theatre	Broadway
2006	Grey Gardens (world premiere)	Edith "Little Edie" Bouvier Beale	Playwrights Horizons	Off-Broadway
2010	101 Dalmatians Musical	Cruella de Vil	National tour	National tour
2011–2012	The Addams Family	Morticia Addams	National tour	National tour
2014	The Witches of Eastwick	Alexandra Spofford	Ogunquit Playhouse	Regional
2022	The Cher Show	Star	Ogunquit Playhouse	Regional
2023	The Addams Family	Morticia Addams	Broadway at Music Circus	Regional
2024	Water for Elephants	Barbara	Imperial Theatre	Broadway
2025	The Last Bimbo of the Apocalypse	Mother	Pershing Square Signature Center	Off-Broadway

== Television ==
Year	Title	Role	Notes
Unknown	Guiding Light	Unknown	Unknown episodes
2004	Ed	Erin	Episode: "Best Wishes"
2004	Without a Trace	Debbie	Episode: "The Line"

== Film ==
Year	Title	Role	Notes
2008	Sex and the City	Flight Attendant	
