= Mind the Gap Theatre =

The brainchild of Paula D'Alessandris, Mind The Gap (MTG) Theatre Company was conceived in 1998 to import edgy British productions, readings and workshops to New York audiences and, in return, export some of America's unknown theatrical talent to the United Kingdom. Featuring An Anglo-American repertory company of actors and writers, the New York City-based company maintains active ties to an assortment of British theatre agencies and has a literary staff that reads hundreds of new scripts each year. In 2001, Dame Helen Mirren and Dame Judi Dench joined MTG's Board of Advisors. In 2013 Dame Harriet Walter joined the board.

The title is taken from a warning message frequently heard on the London Underground train system, where a voice reminds passengers to Mind the gap when alighting from the train; it also alludes to the gap between British and American theatre.

== Notable Productions and Workshops ==
- U.S. premiere of Under the Blue Sky by David Eldridge (dramatist) (Best New West End Play 2000, Time Out London)
- Tony Vellela's Labor Days, directed by Austin Pendleton starring Tony Award-winner Donna Murphy
- Three Tables by Dan Remmes, Flights by Susan Cameron and The Devil's Parole by Eric Giancoli were MTG-sponsored productions in the annual Samuel French Inc. Festival of New Plays. All were winners and subsequently published.
- New York premiere of Gary Owen (playwright)'s In the Pipeline at Manhattan Theatre Source
- World premiere of Tim Mark's The Cleric at 59E59 Theatres in New York
- Theatrical premiere of Gary Oldman's Nil by Mouth, adapted for stage by Paula D'Alessandris as part of the British Airways sponsored UKwithNYC

== Regular Features and Projects ==
The company hosts periodic fundraisers which in the past have included celebrity talent such as Stephen Frost, founding members of Stomp (dance troupe), Emily Harvey (from the West End production of The Phantom of the Opera) and Tony Award Nominee Gavin Lee (Mary Poppins).

It also offers ongoing performances at the St. George's Arts Initiative alongside host Jim Dale and a monthly reading series at the British-themed Telephone Bar & Grill in New York.

Its new series, BritBits, performs every few months featuring new works by American and British playwrights as performed by its Anglo-American repertory company.
