= Nick Meglin =

American cartoonist (1935–2018)

- Born: July 30, 1935 Brooklyn, New York, U.S.
- Died: June 2, 2018 (aged 82)
- Areas: Cartoonist, Writer, Artist, Editor
- Notable works: Mad; Superfan; Tim and Scrooge; Grumpy Old Men: The Musical

Nick Meglin (July 30, 1935 – June 2, 2018) was an American writer, humorist, and artist. He was known for his work as a contributor, comics writer, illustrator and editor for the satirical magazine Mad. He also scripted Superfan, a 1970s comic strip by Jack Davis. He was active as a lyricist of musical theatre, and had columns in various specialized magazines about culture and sports.

== Biography ==
Meglin graduated from Brooklyn College and earned a certificate from the School of Visual Arts.

Meglin spent most of his career at Mad, on whose editorial staff he worked for 48 years. His progress can be observed by studying the magazine's masthead, which moved him from "Ideas" to "War Correspondent" (during an army stint) to "Editorial Associate" to "Associate Editor" to "Editor," a position which he held for 20 years. His business cards used to identify him as Mad's Tennis Editor. After retiring from that job in 2004, Meglin was listed as a Contributing Editor. During the course of his career with Mad, he discovered and mentored artists such as Sam Viviano.

Although he had fewer than ten official bylines in 48 years, Meglin was a major behind-the-scenes contributor to the satirical magazine's contents and direction. Following his death, Mad Senior Editor Charlie Kadau wrote, "Through his guidance of the writers and artists for so many years, [he was] most responsible for that thing we call the “MAD Voice.” They say Mad influenced our culture. Well, it was Nick Meglin who influenced Mad."

Mad artists often caricatured themselves and their compatriots. Meglin was often portrayed as a tennis player due to his love of the sport, particularly by Sergio Aragones and in Dave Berg's "The Lighter Side" feature.

In addition to his work on Mad, Meglin wrote for the musical theater. He wrote book and lyrics for Tim and Scrooge, a musical sequel to A Christmas Carol with music by Neil Berg. He also collaborated with Berg and librettist Dan Remmes on Grumpy Old Men: The Musical. Meglin was also an art instructor at the School of Visual Arts in New York City; his books include The Art of Humorous Illustration and Drawing from Within. His marriage to Lucille Guerriero ended in divorce.

Later in his life, Meglin lived in Durham, North Carolina, where he taught illustration. On June 2, 2018, Meglin died of a heart attack at the age of 82. A two-page tribute to him, consisting of testimonials by his colleagues, was included in the October 2018 issue of Mad.
