= Klea Blackhurst =

American actress

Klea Blackhurst is an American actress. She is best known for Everything the Traffic Will Allow, her tribute to Ethel Merman that debuted in New York in 2001. Among many accolades, this production earned her the inaugural Special Achievement Award from Time Out New York magazine. The recording of Everything the Traffic Will Allow was named one of the top ten show albums of 2002 by Talkin' Broadway.com.

Klea next turned her passion for musical-theatre history toward the Broadway career of composer Vernon Duke and debuted Autumn in New York: Vernon Duke's Broadway at New York's Café Carlyle which subsequently played a sold-out engagement at Joe's Pub at The Public Theater.

In the Fall of 2007 Klea teamed with Billy Stritch to create Dreaming of a Song: The Music of Hoagy Carmichael which they debuted at Manhattan's Metropolitan Room. This performance received a Backstage Bistro Award. The recording of Dreaming of a Song: The Music of Hoagy Carmichael was released on October 28, 2008.

Klea's many concert appearances include the recent London Palladium presentation of “Jerry Herman’s Broadway.” She made her Carnegie Hall debut starring with Michael Feinstein in an evening devoted to the work of composer, Jule Styne. In 2002, Klea made her London debut (stage, radio and television) at Royal Albert Hall. As part of the BBC Proms, she sang the role of Ado Annie in a special concert version of Oklahoma! celebrating composer Richard Rodgers centenary. She returned to London the following spring to debut Everything the Traffic Will Allow at the Greenwich Theatre. Other notable appearances include the Atlanta Symphony Orchestra's tribute to Leonard Bernstein; The Paley Center for Media's tribute to Kay Swift; Jazz at Lincoln Center; 92nd Street Y Lyrics & Lyricist Series (Leo Robin & Cole Porter); The Oak Room in the Algonquin Hotel; San Francisco's Plush Room; New Jersey Performing Arts Center; Guild Hall in East Hampton; and multiple appearances at the Chicago Humanities Festival.

Klea's theatre credits include Mama Morton in Pioneer Theatre Company’s production of Chicago; the dual roles of Bernice/Marilyn in the Off Broadway production of Bingo; Nails O’Reilly Duquesne in Red, Hot and Blue at San Francisco’s 42nd Street Moon; Sally Adams in Call Me Madam, also at 42nd Street Moon; Reno Sweeney in Anything Goes at the Shubert Theatre in New Haven; Debbie in the original Off Broadway production of Oil City Symphony; Rennabelle in Radio Gals Off Broadway at the John Houseman Theatre; and the role of Hippolyta in By Jupiter in the York Theatre’s Musicals in Mufti series.

Klea made her screen debut in the award-winning short film, Andy Across the Water, written and directed by Leo Geter.

Klea’s television and radio appearances include The Caroline Rhea Show, The Rosie O'Donnell Show, Sesame Street, Law and Order: SVU, and A Prairie Home Companion. She currently has a recurring role as deranged Nancy Grace parody "Shelby Cross" on The Onion News Network on IFC.

Klea's recordings of Dreaming of a Song: The Music of Hoagy Carmichael, Autumn in New York: Vernon Duke’s Broadway, and Everything the Traffic Will Allow are on the Ghostlight Records label are available at www.ghostlightrecords.com. Other recordings on which she is featured include Jule Styne in Hollywood on the PS Classics label; the original cast recordings of Bingo and Radio Gals; Lost in Boston IV, Unsung Irving Berlin, and The Best of Off Broadway.

Blackhurst was born and raised in Salt Lake City, Utah.
