= Angie Schworer =

American actress and dancer

- Born: April 23, 1965 (age 59); Fort Mitchell, Kentucky, U.S.
- Other names: Angie L. Schworer
- Education: Northern Kentucky University
- Occupations: Actress; Dancer
- Years active: 1991–present
- Spouse: Richard Bird

Angie Schworer is a stage actress and dancer best known for originating the role of Angie in The Prom on Broadway and for being the longest-running Ulla in The Producers.

== Life and career ==
Schworer started dancing lessons at age 5. Although she didn't do any musical theatre until she started college, she was a cheerleader in high school. She attended Northern Kentucky University's School of Arts for three years before pursuing a scholarship at Disney Orlando. In 1991, while still working at Disney, she auditioned for the Broadway show The Will Rogers Follies and booked the job and debuted as a swing. She then went on to replace in shows such as, Crazy for You, Sunset Boulevard, Annie Get Your Gun and Young Frankenstein.

Schworer was an assistant choreographer in the 2000 Broadway revival of The Rocky Horror Show. In 2001, she was in the original cast of The Producers as an ensemble member and Ulla understudy. After touring from 2002 to 2003 with the company, she returned to Broadway in 2003 and served as the permanent Ulla replacement until the show closed in 2007. She has been in the original Broadway ensembles of Catch Me If You Can, Big Fish and Something Rotten!. She starred as Angie Dickinson in The Prom For her performance in The Prom, Schworer was nominated for the 2019 Chita Rivera Award for Outstanding Female Dancer in a Broadway Show.

She also has many regional and touring credits including Annie (Lily St. Regis), Disaster! (Jackie), Mamma Mia! (Tanya), Always a Bridesmaid (Monette), Sweet Charity (Nickie), and Chicago (Roxie Hart).

== Broadway productions ==
Year	Show	Role
1991	The Will Rogers Follies	Swing(original)/ Betty's sister, New Ziegfeld girl, Will's Sister(replacement)
1992	Crazy For You	Susie/Patsy understudy(replacement)/ Ensemble/Betsy(replacement)
1994	Sunset Boulevard	Hedy Lamarr, Beautician, 3rd Harlem Girl
1999	Annie Get Your Gun	Sylvia Potter-Porter, Ensemble
2001	The Producers	Ensemble/Ulla understudy/ Ulla(replacement)
2008	Young Frankenstein	Ensemble(replacement)
2011	Catch Me If You Can	Ensemble/Paula Abagnale understudy
2013	Big Fish	Ensemble
2015	Something Rotten!	Ensemble
2018	The Prom	Angie Dickinson
2022	Some Like It Hot	Minnie

== Personal life ==
Schworer is married to Richard Bird, her second husband, is stepmother to his two children, and is also a grandmother.
