= Jeff Whiting =

American theatre director

Jeff Whiting (born March 27, 1972) is an American theater director, choreographer, performer and entrepreneur. He has been involved in theatrical productions, concerts, operas and special events around the world. Whiting is also known for developing multiple businesses that support theater makers: "Stage Write," a digital app that simplifies the documentation of staging and choreography, "Open Jar Studios," a 50,000/sf rehearsal facility which features the largest column-free studios in New York City, "Stage Door Network," "Stage Door Pass," and not-for-profit "Stage Door Foundation."

== Biography ==
Whiting was born in Denver, Colorado, the son of David L. Whiting and Bette Whiting (née Snelson). He was the third of five siblings. He grew up in Salt Lake City, Utah. At the age of 10, he was introduced to theater, dance, acting and singing, under Xan S. Johnson's tutoring at the University of Utah's Children's Theater program. In 1996, he received a Bachelor of Fine Arts in Music Dance Theater from Brigham Young University in Provo, Utah.

Whiting began his professional performing career in 1996 as the original Quasimodo in Disney's The Hunchback of Notre Dame at Disney/MGM Studios in Orlando, Florida. He also originated additional Disney roles in the original "Disney Cruise Line" productions of "Disney Dreams (Peter Pan)," "Hercules (Young Hercules)," and "The Voyage of the Ghost Ship." In 1997, Whiting moved to New York City and performed in numerous regional theatrical productions.

Whiting began working as a director and choreographer. He was hired as the Assistant Director for the national tours of Hairspray and The Producers, which is how he was introduced to Susan Stroman. In 2007, Stroman invited him to be Assistant Choreographer on the Broadway production of Young Frankenstein, marking Whiting's first Broadway credit. He went on to collaborate with Stroman on several other projects. He was Assistant Director/Choreographer on Happiness at Lincoln Center and was Associate Director/Choreographer on The Scottsboro Boys, which received 12 Tony nominations. He was also Diane Paulus' Associate Director on the Broadway revival of Hair, which won the Tony Award for best musical revival. In 2013, Jeff was the Associate Director for Big Fish. In 2014, Jeff was the Associate Director for Bullets Over Broadway.

In addition to his work on Broadway, Whiting has directed numerous concerts and events. His work includes a series of concerts at Carnegie Hall with James Taylor (starring James Taylor, Bette Midler, Sting, Steve Martin and Tony Bennett) and "A Tribute to Susan Stroman" (co-hosted by Matthew Broderick and Nathan Lane and produced by The Vineyard Theatre). Opera credits include We Open In Paris at Glimmerglass Opera.

In 2021, Whiting was invited to re-imagine America's longest-running outdoor symphonic drama, "The Lost Colony" production in North Carolina, notably making updates to ensure accurate and respectful depiction of the Indigenous characters in the play, originally penned by Paul Green. He has also directed and choreographed numerous events and shows for The Walt Disney Company in the USA, Brazil, Mexico and India, including the world's largest parade ever to pass Cobacabana in Rio de Janeiro, Brazil.

Whiting delivered a TEDTalk on February 7, 2016, titled "Rising Beyond Limits with Open Jar Thinking" at Queens University in Kingston, Ontario sharing his philosophy of "Open Jar Thinking."

== Stage Write Software ==
In 2012, Whiting released a software application for directors, choreographers and stage managers called Stage Write. According to members of the Broadway community, the app has revolutionized the task of documenting staging and choreography. It was lauded by the Society of Stage Directors and Choreographers as "the new standard in documentation" for directors and choreographers. The app is already in use on numerous Broadway productions, concert tours, television shows and films in production around the globe. Apple featured StageWrite as part of their 'Life on iPad' campaign as was selected from over 140,000 apps to be featured. Apple also featured the app during the 2013 Apple Keynote and was mentioned by Apple CEO, Tim Cook, by saying "Honestly, we could never have imagined all of the ways that people are using the iPad. Today we celebrate some of our customers creativity and genius of using their iPads…"

== Open Jar Studios ==
In 2018, Whiting launched a rehearsal facility in New York City – Open Jar Studios – featuring 50,000/sf of rehearsal space, which frequently hosts development and rehearsals for Broadway shows in the 22-column free studios in the Times Square facility. Created in partnership with many notable figures from the Broadway community, the studios have been called "Broadway's Creative Home."

== Bway Printing / Bway Headshots ==
Open Jar Studios houses a boutique print shop Bway Printing, which prints scripts and scores for thousands of rehearsals which occur throughout New York City. Bway Headshots prints high-quality reproductions of actor headshots utilized for in-person auditions.

== The Broadway Relief Project ==
During the COVID-19 pandemic, Whiting transformed Open Jar Studios into a PPE Factory hiring over 400 individuals from the Broadway community to create hospital gowns for the NYC Public hospitals in an effort called the Broadway Relief Project. The story featured in VOGUE, and in an award-winning documentary "The Show Must Go On" has captured the resilient efforts of the Broadway community during COVID-19.

== The Open Jar Institute ==
In 2003, Whiting founded the Open Jar Institute, which allows young actors to train one-on-one with Broadway professionals. The institute provides workshops and masterclasses with professionals for students from around the world.

== The Stage Door Foundation / Stage Door Network/ Stage Door Pass ==
The not-for-profit organization – The Stage Door Foundation – founded by Jeff Whiting is dedicated to providing support for theatre makers by providing financial support and developmental support for new works. The digital platform Stage Door Network connects theatre artists and the Stage Door Pass connects theatre fans with theatre artists - all to support the Foundation.
