= My Best Friend's Wedding (musical) =

- The Musical
- Music: Burt Bacharach
- Lyrics: Hal David
- Book: Ronald Bass; Jonathan Harvey
- Basis: My Best Friend's Wedding by Ronald Bass
- Productions: 2024 Ogunquit

My Best Friend's Wedding is a jukebox musical with a book by Ronald Bass and Jonathan Harvey featuring songs by songwriters Burt Bacharach and Hal David, based on the 1997 film of the same name with screenplay by Bass.

== Production ==
It was announced that the musical would make its world premiere at the Theatre Royal, Plymouth on 19 September 2020 before touring the UK; however, due to the COVID-19 pandemic, the production was delayed by a year to open at the Palace Theatre, Manchester on 20 September 2021 before touring the UK with dates until May 2022. The production was due to star Alexandra Burke as Julianne Potter, directed by Rachel Kavanaugh and produced by Michael Harrison and David Ian.

On 30 June 2021, it was announced that the production was cancelled due to the impact of the COVID-19 pandemic. The producers revealed that they hope to find a way to revisit the show at a later date.

The musical made its world premiere at the Ogunquit Playhouse in Fall 2024, running from September 26 to October 27. Directed by Kathleen Marshall, the cast included Krystal Joy Brown as Julianne, Matt Doyle as Michael, and Telly Leung as George.

== Musical numbers ==
The musical features the hit songs of songwriters Burt Bacharach and Hal David including:

- "I'll Never Fall in Love Again"
- "I Just Don't Know What to Do with Myself"
- "Walk on By"
- "I Say a Little Prayer"
- "What's New Pussycat?"
