= Intimate Strangers (1977 film) =

1977 television film by John Llewellyn Moxey

- Genre: Drama
- Written by: Richard and Esther Shapiro
- Directed by: John Llewellyn Moxey
- Starring: Dennis Weaver; Sally Struthers; Tyne Daly; Larry Hagman
- Music by: Fred Karlin
- Country of origin: United States
- Original language: English

Production
- Executive producer: Charles W. Fries
- Producer: Richard and Esther Shapiro
- Cinematography: Robert B. Hauser
- Editor: Walter Hannemann
- Running time: 96 minutes
- Production company: Charles Fries Productions

Original release
- Network: ABC
- Release: November 11, 1977

Intimate Strangers (alternative title: Battered) is a 1977 American made-for-television drama film directed by John Llewellyn Moxey and written and produced by Richard and Esther Shapiro.

The film, starring Dennis Weaver, Sally Struthers, Tyne Daly and Larry Hagman, deals with the subject domestic violence and has received positive reviews since its release, acknowledged as "an outstanding social drama" by the TV Guide. Daly received an Emmy Award nomination in the category "Best Supporting Actress".

== Plot ==
Donald Halston loses a sale of an insurance policy at work, leading to a financial setback. He takes out this personal and financial humiliation on his loving wife Janice. After a fight over her daily spending, he accidentally pushes her, causing her to spill coffee over herself. He immediately apologizes, and Janice does not wait long before forgiving him. The next morning, she runs into an old friend Karen Renshaw, who once left town for Florida but is now working as a draftswoman after her divorce. They quickly rekindle their friendship.

Donald, meanwhile, is convinced by his colleague and friend Mort Burns, to have a boys night out with two attractive women. Donald spends the night with one of the women and cheats on his wife. He returns home at night to a worried Janice, though instead of apologizing, he admits to his unloyalty in a rage, and starts beating her when she gets mad at him for the infidelity. The police quickly arrive due to complaints of neighbors, though Janice lies about the situation to protect her husband.

The next morning, Janice's daughter Peggy, confronts her mother with the domestic violence, and Janice assures her that she will stick by her husband. Donald, meanwhile, visits his unloving father, and learns that the rent for his retirement home has not yet been paid. At the local gym, Mort's wife Marilyn, among others, notice that Janice has multiple bruises on her body, but she denies having a problem. After class, she receives a crisis number for battered women. Even though Donald makes a convincing apology about his behavior, promising her to better his life, Janice attends a self-help meeting with other battered women. There, she reacts in denial when others ask about her husband's violent tendencies, and ends up protecting Donald yet again, despite fearing that Donald will someday hit the children as well.

Donald attempts to make up with Janice by accompanying her to one of Karen's parties. As he and Janice talk, Donald admits that his father used to whip him when he was younger, but says that he's better for it. However, when Janice asks that whether his father also beat his mother, Donald stays silent. Donald grows jealous when Janice talks to a younger man, and demands that they leave immediately. At home, Janice gets upset for being humiliated, causing Donald to abuse her yet again. This time, the police show up and arrest Donald. Meanwhile, Janice is in hospital and is visited by an attorney, Shaola Reems, to sue her husband. Karen collects Janice's stuff at her home and tells Donald what a horrible man he is. Donald makes another promise to change, but Janice convinces him that he can't do this without the help of a therapist. Karen criticizes Janice for not leaving Donald, but Janice insists that she does not want to be a divorced woman like Karen.

Janice returns home, only to get into a fight with Donald over Karen, and her son Chris gets thrown across the room. Horrified, Janice takes the children and immediately leaves her husband. She attempts to start a new life, which includes a job, though one night Donald breaks into his former home and both chokes and rapes his wife. Even though Donald can't be sued for rape due to 'connubial rights' despite separation, he will be prosecuted for the abuse charges. Donald is arrested and Mort bails him out. In the bar, Mort and Donald talk, Mort telling Donald he doesn't know him anymore, that he might have occasionally joked or thought about abuse, but he would never actually follow it through.

In the courthouse, Donald is talking with his lawyer, and tells him he's starting to believe that maybe he belongs in prison. Despite his protests, Donald's lawyer is able to talk to Reems to get him a deal that would require him to plead guilty for 6 months' probation without jail time, a $500 fine, and a restraining order from his wife. In the final scenes, Donald has a small conversation in the courthouse with Janice. She tells him she no longer believes he can change for the better, but he tells her that he promises to see Dr. Morgan and asks her whether she could give him another chance once Dr. Morgan declares him mentally okay again, admitting that he was always afraid that he wouldn't live up to his father's or his own expectations and always afraid of losing her. Janice tells him that when she first fell in love with him years ago, she didn't care whether he would one day become wealthy. The film ends ambiguously as Donald and Janice look at each other one last time before Donald and his lawyer prepare to enter the courtroom.

== Cast ==
- Dennis Weaver as Donald Halston
- Sally Struthers as Janice Halston
- Tyne Daly as Karen Renshaw (Emmy nomination Best Supporting Actress)
- Larry Hagman as Mort Burns
- Melvyn Douglas as Donald's father
- Brian Andrews as Chris Halston
- Quinn Cummings as Peggy Halston
- Julian Burton as Dr. James Morgan
- Ellen Travolta as Marilyn Burns
