= The Music Hall (Portsmouth) =

- The Music Hall in 2023 advertising the New Hampshire Film Festival
- Interactive map of The Music Hall
- Address: 28 Chestnut Street
- Location: Portsmouth, New Hampshire
- Coordinates: 43°04′33″N 70°45′35″W
- Capacity: 895
- Type: Theatre

Construction
- Opened: January 30, 1878

Website
- www.themusichall.org

The Music Hall is an 895-seat theater located at 28 Chestnut Street in Portsmouth, New Hampshire, in the United States. Built in 1878, The Music Hall claims to be the oldest operating theater in New Hampshire and the 14th-oldest in the United States. An independent venue that offers music, readings, comedy, and cinema, The Music Hall brings in 130,000 visitors a year. In the past it has hosted musicians such as Tony Bennett and authors such as Dan Brown.

== History ==
In 1878, a group of Seacoast residents, including a banker, a railroad executive, a lawyer, a housewife, and a clergyman—all members of the prominent Peirce family—joined together to rebuild Portsmouth's only venue for entertainment, which had burned to the ground the year before. “The Temple,” as the theater was called, had once been a Baptist meetinghouse and, before that, the site of the country's first almshouse, as well as a prison. The land surrounding the charred lot was owned by the family.

Following the fire on Christmas Eve of 1876, the Peirces knew that “a community is known to some extent by the character and place of its amusements,” a sentiment echoed on the opening night in a speech by Sen. W.H.Y. Hackett. The opening celebration on January 30, 1878, was followed by the sold-out performance of two well-known British farces, Caste and John Wopps, brought up from Boston.

For the next few decades, The Music Hall brought the community opera, drama, dance, and traditional vaudeville fare from as far away as Europe and as close as Portsmouth's own community players. The famed D'Oyly Carte Opera Company (Gilbert and Sullivan) performed The Pirates of Penzance within weeks of its US premiere, and countless Shakespearean actors known around the world graced The Music Hall stage, including Margaret Mather, Thomas W. Keene and John Drew. Buffalo Bill Cody and his Wild West Show performed their smaller indoor show numerous times, and Portsmouth saw its very first moving pictures on Edison's Graphophone here in 1898.

Broadway was well represented, with performances of Peter Pan, The Wizard of Oz and No, No, Nanette among many other shows that came to the theater within the first weeks of leaving “The Great White Way” in New York City. As is true today, The Music Hall was also dedicated to providing support for local organizations to raise money and awareness through the arts. Groups such as the Masons, the Portsmouth Athletic Club, and The Chase Home for Children produced local benefits to raise money for their various causes.

In 1901, The Music Hall's new owner, the politician-brewer-railroad baron Frank Jones, envisioned and executed its first renovation. The theater, now endowed with a proscenium arch and stage house, remained a central feature of the downtown area through the mid-1920s.

Between the world wars, The Music Hall remained the home of community events and high school graduations, but fewer traveling shows were presented. Moving pictures became the primary entertainment draw for residents of Portsmouth. Though adapted for film showing, the theater could not compete with the three venues created in the 1910s expressly for that purpose, and went through a period of partial closings that lasted until a Kittery man purchased the building in 1945 at auction and renamed the hall “The Civic.”

For almost four decades audiences watched the stars of the screen ranging from John Wayne to John Barrymore and were able to catch up on the latest newsreels or episodes of their favorite serial. By the mid-1960s, the Hall had been leased to movie palace mogul E.M. Loew and operated in tandem with his other theatre, The Colonial, in Market Square. Though relegated to showing some of the less popular film titles, The Civic remained a favored venue for the Portsmouth community until it was sold to a holding company in the early 1980s when it was considered “too old” to be of any use to Loew.

After another brief period of closure and trip to the auction block, The Music Hall was once again re-opened. Due to the efforts of a group of concerned residents known as The Friends of The Music Hall, who followed in the footsteps of the Peirce Family of more than a century before, the theater emerged as a non-profit center for the performing arts.

Now the only remaining venue of its kind in Portsmouth, The Music Hall operates as it did in 1878, bringing the region entertainment, both live and on film, and providing a meeting place for members of the community. In recent years the theater has welcomed such stars as Wynton Marsalis, Alan Alda, Patti LuPone, Idina Menzel, John Updike and Crosby & Nash. Grammy, Tony and Pulitzer Prize winners have graced the stage in performances unique to the region.

== Restoration project ==
In 2003, The Music Hall was named an "American Treasure" under a program sponsored by the National Park Service and the National Trust for Historic Preservation, which allowed the organization to collect a large federal grant to begin restoration work. Armed with $395,000 in grant money from the federal government, work began on a multi-phase restoration project designed to return the theater to the way it was during its heyday, circa 1901.

The restoration project's Phase I included the refurbishment of the theater's proscenium arch, auditorium ceiling, and stairs. As of July 2007, more than $910,000 had been fundraised to complete the work. During exploratory work on the water-stained ceiling, elaborate designs including Roman figures were discovered under four coats of paint. Work on the archway was completed during the summer of 2006, and the restored interior of the auditorium was revealed on September 8, 2007.

== Live performances ==
=== Intimately Yours ===
A music series that takes well-known artists such as Bruce Cockburn and Suzanne Vega and puts them in an intimate venue setting.

=== Live at the Loft ===
Located in the smaller Loft venue, this music series includes artists from around the corner and around the world in a collection of discovery acts.

=== Writers on a New England Stage ===
An award-winning series in partnership with New Hampshire Public Radio that interviews bestselling and award-winning authors like Margaret Atwood and John Updike. The Writers in the Loft series offers a similar experience in an intimate setting.

=== Hilarity ===
Stand up, improv troupes, comic dynasties, and discovery acts appear on stage in both venues. These acts include seasoned pros from Comedy Central and up-and-coming fresh faces from YouTube.

=== The Ogunquit Playhouse at The Music Hall ===
Broadway comes to Portsmouth as the legendary Ogunquit Playhouse join forces with The Music Hall, bringing musicals to Seacoast audiences for the holidays. Winter 2018's show is Elf The Musical.

=== School Days Series ===
Actors in children's theater brings books, plays, and music to life in these shows, entertaining children from 80 Seacoast Pre-K to Middle School groups, homeschoolers, and families.

=== Innovation + Leadership ===
Forums, presentations, interviews, and documentaries tackle issues both hyper-local and global about 21st century-living with local experts and international leaders.

== Cinema ==
Mainstream, independent, and foreign films are shown at both the Historic Theater and the Loft. These include weekly Extraordinary Cinema films, one-night-only Wildcard movies, and broadcasts from The Met and National Theatre of London.

=== Telluride by the Sea ===
A three-day film festival featuring movies fresh from Telluride Film Festival that, in the past, has hosted such films as Capote, Finding Neverland, and Bob Dylan: No Direction Home.

=== Clubs ===
There are several clubs and talks series that dive deeper into books and films with expert hosts and discussion leaders. Available to members and the general public alike, these social clubs host film buffs, bookworms, opera fans, and local influencers.
