= Sally Struthers =

American actress and activist (born 1947)

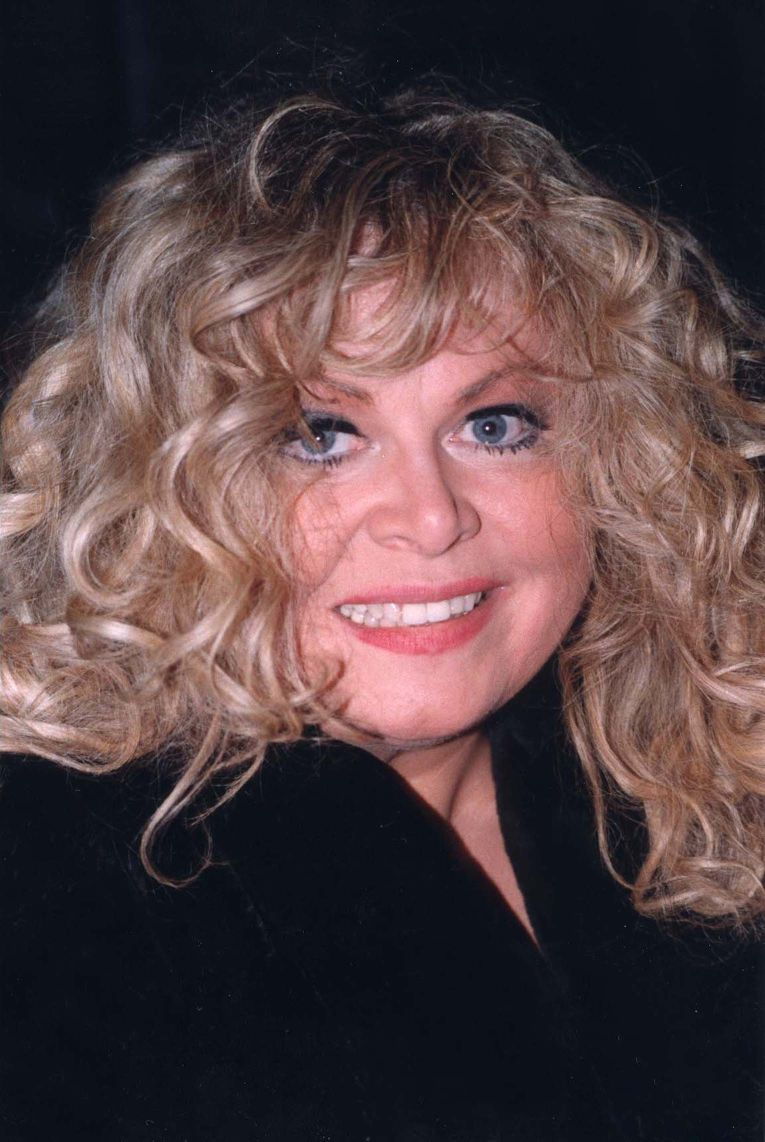
- Struthers in 1996
- Born: Sally Anne Struthers; July 28, 1947 (age 79); Portland, Oregon, U.S.
- Occupations: Actress; activist
- Years active: 1970–present
- Known for: Gloria Stivic in All in the Family; Babette Dell in Gilmore Girls
- Spouse: William C. Rader (m. 1977; div. 1983)
- Children: 1

Sally Anne Struthers (born July 28, 1947) is an American actress and activist. She is known for her portrayal of Gloria Stivic, the daughter of Archie and Edith Bunker on the sitcom All in the Family (1971–1978). For this role, Struthers received numerous accolades, including four Golden Globe Award nominations and five Primetime Emmy Award nominations, two of which she won for Outstanding Supporting Actress in a Comedy Series.

Born and raised in Portland, Oregon, Struthers began her acting career in 1970 appearing on the variety shows The Smothers Brothers Comedy Hour and The Tim Conway Comedy Hour. The same year, she had a supporting role in Bob Rafelson's Five Easy Pieces, followed by another role in the Sam Peckinpah-directed thriller The Getaway (1972). She also worked as a voice actor, portraying Pebbles Flintstone on The Pebbles and Bamm-Bamm Show (1971–1972).

Struthers starred on All in the Family for eight seasons, between 1971 and 1978, as well as appearing in the spin-off series Archie Bunker's Place (1979–1982) and Gloria (1982–1983). She portrayed Marsha McMurray in the sitcom 9 to 5 (1986–1988) before resuming regular work as a voice actor for numerous Hanna-Barbera cartoons, including Yo Yogi! and Droopy, Master Detective, as well as TaleSpin and the ABC series Dinosaurs (1991–1994). Between 2000 and 2007, Struthers portrayed Babette Dell on the series Gilmore Girls. Since 2024, Struthers has played Virginia Foldau on the Netflix series A Man on the Inside.

In addition to her acting work, Struthers is known for her longtime role as a spokesperson and activist for the Christian Children's Fund (later named ChildFund), advocating for impoverished children in developing countries.

== Early life ==
Sally Anne Struthers was born on July 28, 1947, in Portland, Oregon, the second of two daughters born to Portland native Margaret Caroline (née Jernes; 1917–1996) and Robert Alden Struthers (1917–1968), a surgeon originally from Manchester, New Hampshire. Her mother was a first-generation American, born to Norwegian parents who immigrated to the United States and settled in Portland. Struthers was raised a Lutheran. She has an older sister, Susan, as well as a half-sister and two half-brothers through her father.

Struthers' father abandoned the family when she was approximately nine years old. Following her father's departure, Struthers was raised by her single mother in the Concordia neighborhood of northeast Portland. Her mother, who supported herself and her two daughters working at Bonneville Power Administration as a contract auditor, suffered from significant depression during Struthers' childhood.

Struthers graduated from Grant High School in 1965. After graduating, she relocated to Los Angeles, California, where she studied acting at the Pasadena Playhouse College of Theatre Arts.

== Career ==
=== Early film and television roles ===
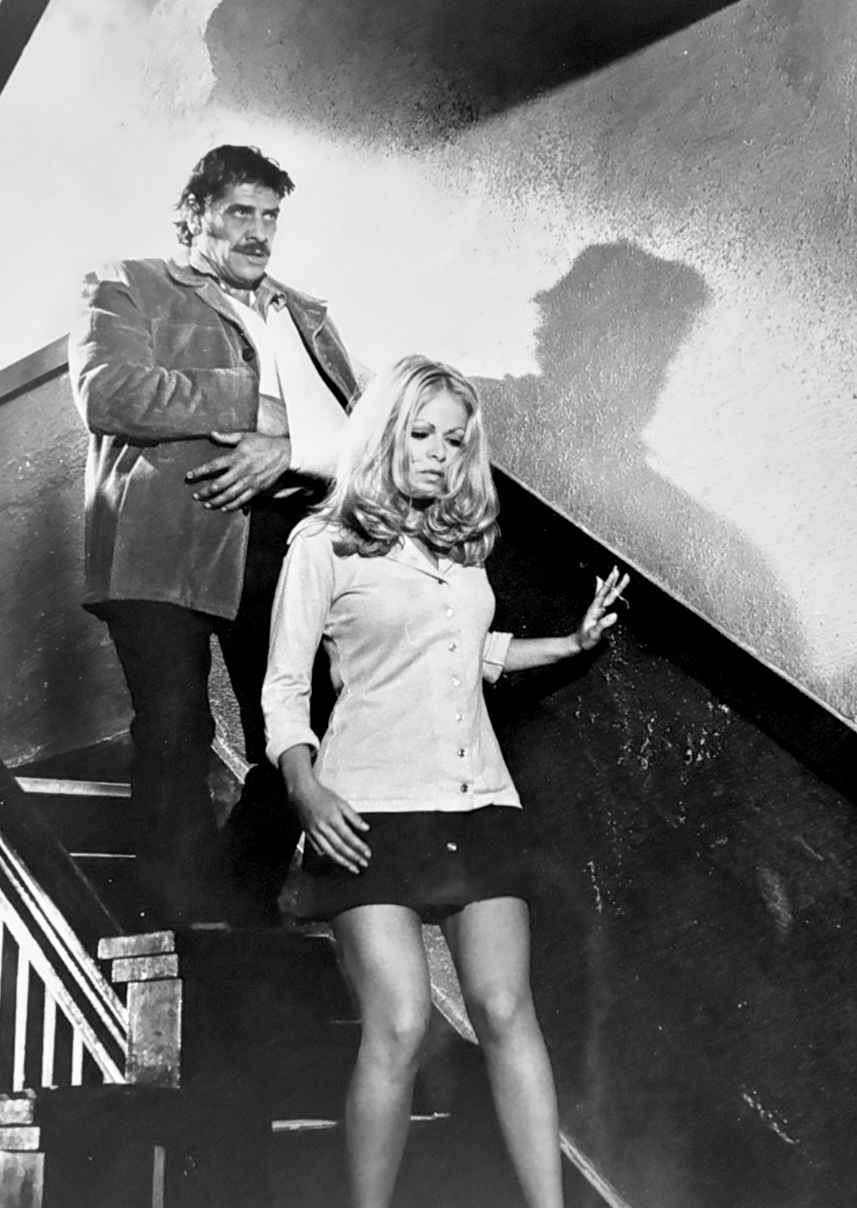
Struthers and Al Lettieri in The Getaway (1972)

Struthers was hired as a regular performer and dancer on both The Smothers Brothers Summer Show and The Tim Conway Comedy Hour in 1970.

She made her feature film debut in a bit part in The Phynx (1970), followed by a supporting role in Bob Rafelson's drama Five Easy Pieces (also 1970), starring Jack Nicholson. She subsequently appeared as the restless wife of a veterinarian in Sam Peckinpah's thriller The Getaway (1972), starring Steve McQueen and Ali MacGraw.

=== All in the Family ===
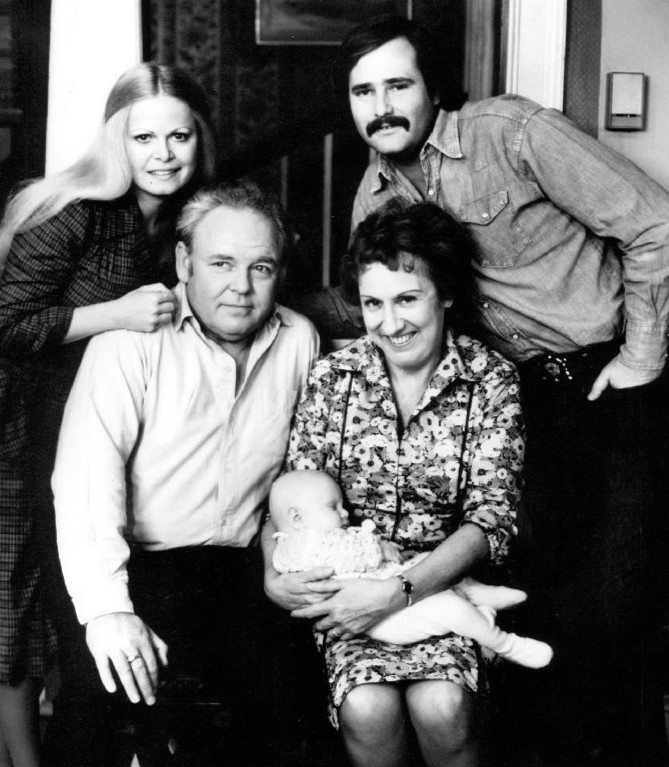
Struthers (upper left) in a 1976 promotional photo of All in the Family

In 1971, Struthers debuted as Gloria Stivic on the sitcom All in the Family, playing the daughter of Archie and Edith Bunker (Carroll O'Connor and Jean Stapleton), and wife of Michael Stivic (Rob Reiner), a dysfunctional working-class family in Queens. Producer Norman Lear had found the actress dancing on The Smothers Brothers Comedy Hour.

According to a WPTT radio interview with Doug Hoerth in 2003, Struthers thought that Rob Reiner's then-fiancée and later wife, Penny Marshall, would get the role of Gloria, as Marshall more resembled Jean Stapleton, who played Edith Bunker. Actress Candice Azzara had played the role of Gloria in a pilot episode, but was soon dropped. After a shaky start, the series became a hit beginning with its summer reruns, giving tens of millions of viewers the chance to see Gloria defending her viewpoints about negative stereotypes and inequality. Struthers won two Emmy Awards (in 1972 and 1979) for her work on the show. In 2012, Struthers recalled the serendipity that helped her land the role:

I had just gotten let go from The Tim Conway Comedy Hour because the suits in New York said that I made the show look cheap. And the producer said, "That's the whole point, we're trying to make it look like the Conway show doesn't have a budget, has no money, and so that's why there's only one Tim Conway dancer instead of a line of them like the June Taylor Dancers on The Jackie Gleason Show, and there's only one musician, and they can't even afford an instrument for him, so he's standing at a music stand, humming the opening theme song." That's funny! And the suits said, "No, it makes the show look cheap." So they let me, the Tim Conway dancer, go. And if they hadn't done that, I wouldn't have been free to read for All in the Family.

Though Struthers has spoken fondly of All in the Family, she was also personally dissatisfied with the static nature of Gloria's character, and regarded only the time between the sixth and eighth seasons of All in the Family, which aired after she made an unsuccessful attempt to sue to get out of her contract with the show, as the best time she had playing Gloria. During the production of All in the Family, Struthers was offered a lead role in John Schlesinger's The Day of the Locust (1975), but was prevented from taking the role because Lear refused to let her out of her contract.

In 2025, Struthers stated that Lear regarded her as the show's "fourth banana" compared to the other three leads, never invited her to any of the dinner parties he held, and told her that he only wanted to cast her in the show because she had "blue eyes and a fat face." The Life and Times of Norman Lear author Tripp Whetsell revealed that Struthers had a tense relationship with Lear and tried to leave All in the Family after the fifth season, spending $40,000 in legal fees in an unsuccessful effort to get out of her contract.

Struthers and her co-star Reiner appeared in eight seasons of the series, with their final appearance on the March 19, 1978 episode.

=== Later work ===
In 1976, she portrayed Bess Houdini opposite Paul Michael Glaser in the Harry Houdini television biopic The Great Houdini. In 1977, she portrayed a housewife who was physically abused by her husband (portrayed by Dennis Weaver) in the made-for-TV movie Intimate Strangers, which was one of the first network features to focus on domestic violence.

On the short-lived Archie Bunker's Place spin-off Gloria (1982–1983), Struthers reprised Gloria as a new divorcée (she became an "exchange student," when husband Mike exchanged her for one of his students). The series co-starred Burgess Meredith as the doctor of an animal clinic with Gloria as his assistant. From 1985 to 1986, Struthers starred as Florence Ungar in the female version of The Odd Couple. Struthers later stated in an interview on Gilbert Gottfried's Amazing Colossal Podcast, that it was an unpleasant experience until Rita Moreno, who was mean-spirited towards Struthers, left the play and was replaced by Brenda Vaccaro.

She was a semi-regular panelist on the 1990 revival of Match Game and an occasional guest on Win, Lose or Draw (even filling in for Vicki Lawrence as host for a week). She also had a recurring role as Bill Miller's manipulative mother, Louise, on Still Standing and regularly appeared on Gilmore Girls as Babette Dell. She also provided voices for a number of animated series such as The Pebbles and Bamm-Bamm Show (as a teenage Pebbles Flintstone), TaleSpin (as Rebecca Cunningham) and was one of the voice stars on ABC's Dinosaurs produced by Walt Disney and Henson Productions (as Charlene Sinclair).

Struthers starred in the stage production of Annie at the Fabulous Fox Theatre in Atlanta, Georgia, and in the national tour of the production in the late 1990s. She has been a regular since the early 2000s at the Ogunquit Playhouse, in Ogunquit, Maine.

In 2014, Struthers toured in the 50th-anniversary production of Hello, Dolly!, playing Dolly Levi. In 2016, she appeared as a guest star in two episodes of the comedy series Maron, as well reprising her role of Babette Dell in the miniseries Gilmore Girls: A Year in the Life.

In 2024, Struthers began playing Virginia Foldau in the Netflix series A Man on the Inside, starring Ted Danson. She would reprise the role in the show's second season.

== Activism ==
Struthers served as a longtime spokesperson for the Christian Children's Fund (later renamed ChildFund), advocating on behalf of impoverished children in developing countries.

In 2009, she participated in a York, Maine fundraising dinner challenging Maine Question 1, a referendum rejecting same-sex marriage in the state. Commenting on her participation, Struthers said: "You have to be without any good conscience to vote against a law that is going to give people the rights we all deserve. God is love and wants us to love one another."

== Commercial work ==
Struthers has been a spokesperson for International Correspondence School (ICS) in television ads, pitching the famous line "Do you want to make more money? Sure, we all do!" ICS was a school with a diverse curriculum that, at the time, had fields of study ranging from brick laying to personal computers.

== Personal life ==
Struthers married psychiatrist William C. Rader on December 18, 1977, in Los Angeles. After having one child, daughter Samantha, the couple divorced on January 19, 1983.

=== Legal issues ===
On September 12, 2012, Struthers was arrested for alleged DUI in Ogunquit, Maine. She was released on the same day with a bail of $160. In 2013, the DUI charge was dropped and she pleaded guilty to a lesser charge of driving to endanger. Her driver's license was suspended for 30 days and she was ordered to pay $1,210 in fines and fees.

== Filmography ==
=== Film ===
Year	Title	Role	Notes	Ref.
1970	The Phynx	World's No. 1 Fan		
1970	Five Easy Pieces	Shirley "Betty"		
1972	The Getaway	Fran Clinton		
1974	Aloha Means Goodbye	Sara Moore	Television film	
1975	Hey, I'm Alive	Helen Klaben	Television film	
1976	The Great Houdini	Bess Houdini	Television film	
1977	Intimate Strangers	Janice Halston	Television film	
1978	My Husband is Missing	Mrs. Katherine Eaton	Television film	
1978	A Different Approach	Cameo	Short film	
1979	...And Your Name Is Jonah	Jenny Corelli		
1981	A Gun in the House	Emily Cates	Television film	
1989	A Deadly Silence	Aunt Marilyn	Television film	
1990	TaleSpin: Plunder & Lightning	Rebecca Cunningham	Voice, television film	
1992	In the Best Interest of the Children	Patty Pepper	Television film	
1997	The Others	Mrs. Zelov		
2001	Out of the Black	Betty		
2001	A Month of Sundays	Onida Roy		
2003	Reeseville	Katie Oakman		
2003	Baadasssss!	Roz		
2005	Hoodwinked!	Granny Abigail Puckett	Unused voice; lines overdubbed by Glenn Close	
2006	What I Did for Love	Aunt Trudy	Television film	
2010	Monster Heroes	Kripta		
2014	Waiting in the Wings: the Musical	Sperm Bank Receptionist		
2015	Hollywood Musical!	Sally		
2016	Still Waiting in the Wings	Lucy		
2017	The Relationtrip	Liam's Mom	Voice	
2017	You & Me	Tilly		
2018	Christmas Harmony	Shirley	Television film	
2023	Evil Sublet	Reena		
2026	Street Smart	Bunny		

=== Television ===
Year	Title	Role	Notes	Ref.
1970	The Smothers Brothers Comedy Hour	Performer	9 episodes	
1970	The Tim Conway Comedy Hour	Performer	8 episodes	
1971–1978	All in the Family	Gloria Stivic	182 episodes	
1971–1972	The Pebbles and Bamm-Bamm Show	Pebbles Flintstone	Voice, 16 episodes	
1971	Love, American Style	Barbara	Episode: "Love and the Triangle"	
1971	Ironside	Sandy Fonda	Episode: "Love, Peace, Brotherhood and Murder"	
1971	The Courtship of Eddie's Father	Katie O'Hara	Episode: "The Blarney Stone"	
1977–1978	Fred Flintstone and Friends	Pebbles Flintstone	Voice, 95 episodes	
1979	The 200th Episode Celebration of All in the Family	Herself	Television special	
1979–1982	Archie Bunker's Place	Gloria Stivic	5 episodes	
1982–1983	Gloria	Gloria Stivic	21 episodes	
1983	The Charmkins	Poison Ivy	Voice, 1 episode	
1985	The Glo Friends	Blanche	Voice, television special	
1985	Alice in Wonderland	Tiger Lily	Miniseries	
1986–1988	9 to 5	Marsha McMurray Shrimpton	52 episodes	
1989	Charles in Charge	Nora Bennington, Nancy Beauman	Episode: "Still at Large"	
1990	Sister Kate	Mrs. Newberry	Episode: "Sweet Sixteen"	
1990	Murder, She Wrote	Nancy La Rue	Episode: "A Body to Die For"	
1990–1991	TaleSpin	Rebecca Cunningham	Voice, 42 episodes	
1991	All in the Family: 20th Anniversary Special	Herself	Television special	
1991	Yo Yogi!	Additional voices	9 episodes	
1991	Tom & Jerry Kids	Jerry's Mother	Voice, episode: "Jerry's Mother"	
1991–1994	Dinosaurs	Charlene Sinclair	Voice, 65 episodes	
1992	The Steadfast Tin Soldier	Narrator	Television special	
1992	Fish Police	Shelly	Voice, episode: "Beauty's Only Fin Deep"	
1992	Wild West C.O.W.-Boys of Moo Mesa	Bessy Bluebell	Voice, episode: "Another Fine Mesa"	
1992	Tiny Toon Adventures	Rhoda's Mom, Witch Sandy	Voice, 2 episodes	
1993–1994	Droopy, Master Detective	Additional voices	13 episodes	
1994	Duckman	Additional voices	Episode: "Cellar Beware"	
1995	The New Adventures of Mother Goose	Mother Goose	Voice, television special	
1998	Cow and Chicken	Girl Enzyme #1	Voice, episode: "Journey to the Center of Cow"	
1998	The Wild Thornberrys	Galapagos Penguin, Iguanas	Voice, episode: "Eliza-cology"	
1999	The Brothers Flub	Additional voices	Voice	
2000–2007	Gilmore Girls	Babette Dell	52 episodes	
2002	General Hospital	Jennifer Smith	6 episodes	
2002	As Told by Ginger	Mrs. Higsby	Voice, episode: "New Girl in Town"	
2003	Sabrina the Teenage Witch	Aunt Lorraine	Episode: "Ping, Ping a Song"	
2003	The Division	Eve Warner	Episode: "Bewitched, Bothered and Bewildered"	
2003–2006	Still Standing	Louise Miller	10 episodes	
2008–2009	Betsy's Kindergarten Adventures	Mrs. O'Connor	Voice, 26 episodes	
2011	American Dad!	Clara	Voice, episode: "A Ward Show"	
2011	Celebrity Ghost Stories	Herself	Episode: "Beverly D'Angelo/Sally Struthers/Melissa George"	
2016	Gilmore Girls: A Year in the Life	Babette Dell	Miniseries	
2016	Maron	Shirley	2 episodes	
2019–2021	Summer Camp Island	Rose / various	Voice, 3 episodes	
2023	Not Quite Narwhal	Mrs. Polypdopoulos	Voice, 10 episodes	
2024–present	A Man on the Inside	Virginia Foldau	10 episodes	

=== Audio dramas ===
Year	Title	Role	Notes	Ref.
2021–2022	Around the Sun	Mrs. Truitt	Voice, 2 episodes	

=== Stage ===
Year	Title	Role	Notes	Ref.
1981	Wally's Cafe	Janet	Brooks Atkinson Theatre, Broadway	
1986	The Female Odd Couple	Florence Ungar	Broadhurst Theatre, Broadway	
1994-1998	Grease	Miss Lynch (Replacement)	Eugene O'Neill Theatre, Broadway	
1998-1999	Annie	Miss Hannigan	20th Anniversary National Tour	
2005	The Best Little Whorehouse in Texas	Mona Stangley	Ogunquit Playhouse, Maine	
2007	The Full Monty	Jeanette Burmeister	Ogunquit Playhouse, Maine	
2008	Nunsense	Mother Superior	25th Anniversary National Tour	
2008	Fiddler on the Roof	Golde	Ogunquit Playhouse, Maine	
2009	All Shook Up	Mayor Matilda Hyde	Ogunquit Playhouse, Maine	
2010	Cinderella	Fairy Godmother	Thousand Oaks Civic Arts Plaza	
2010	Chicago	Matron "Mama" Morton	Ogunquit Playhouse, Maine	
2011	Legally Blonde	Paulette Buonufonte	Ogunquit Playhouse, Maine	
2012	9 to 5	Roz	Ogunquit Playhouse, Maine	
2012	Always, Patsy Cline	Louise Seger	Ogunquit Playhouse, Maine	
2013–2014	Hello Dolly	Dolly Levi	50th Anniversary National Tour	
2013	Thoroughly Modern Millie	Mrs. Meers	Ogunquit Playhouse, Maine	
2014	Witches of Eastwick	Felicia Gabriel	Ogunquit Playhouse, Maine	
2015	Nice Work If You Can Get It	Duchess Estonia Dulworth	Ogunquit Playhouse, Maine	
2016	Anything Goes	Evangeline Harcourt	Gateway Playhouse	
2017	Clue: On Stage	Mrs. Peacock	Bucks County Playhouse	
2017	Bullets Over Broadway	Eden Brent	Ogunquit Playhouse, Maine	
2017	White Christmas	Martha Watson	Ogunquit Playhouse, Maine	
2018	Grumpy Old Men	Punky Olander	Ogunquit Playhouse, Maine	
2019	42nd Street	Maggie Jones	Ogunquit Playhouse, Maine	
2019	Annie	Miss Hannigan	Ogunquit Playhouse, Maine	
2022	Young Frankenstein	Frau Blucher	Ogunquit Playhouse, Maine	
2023	Tootsie	Rita Marshall	Ogunquit Playhouse, Maine	
2024	The Journals of Adam and Eve	Eve	Garry Marshall Theatre	
2024	Crazy for You	Mother/Patricia Fodor	Ogunquit Playhouse, Maine	
2025	An Old-Fashioned Family Murder	Mrs. Peck	George Street Playhouse	

== Accolades ==
Award/association	Year	Category	Nominated work	Result	Ref.
Golden Globe Awards	1972	Best Supporting Actress – Television	All in the Family	Nominated	
Golden Globe Awards	1973	Best Supporting Actress – Television	All in the Family	Nominated	
Golden Globe Awards	1974	Best Supporting Actress – Television	All in the Family	Nominated	
Golden Globe Awards	1977	Best Supporting Actress – Television	All in the Family	Nominated	
Ovation Awards	2010	Featured Actress in a Musical	Cinderella	Won	
Photoplay Awards	1978	Favorite Female Sex Symbol		Nominated	
Primetime Emmy Awards	1972	Outstanding Supporting Actress in a Comedy Series	All in the Family	Won (Note: Tied with Valerie Harper for The Mary Tyler Moore Show.)	
Primetime Emmy Awards	1973	Outstanding Supporting Actress in a Comedy Series	All in the Family	Nominated	
Primetime Emmy Awards	1974	Outstanding Supporting Actress in a Comedy Series	All in the Family	Nominated	
Primetime Emmy Awards	1978	Outstanding Supporting Actress in a Comedy Series	All in the Family	Nominated	
Primetime Emmy Awards	1979	Outstanding Supporting Actress in a Comedy Series	All in the Family	Won	
