= Neil Berg =

American composer

Neil Berg is an American composer/lyricist best known for the hit off-Broadway musical The Prince and the Pauper, as well as the award-winning rock musical The 12, Grumpy Old Men: The Musical, Off- Broadway’s The Sabbath Girl, Charlie Hustle: The Pete Rose Musical, and the upcoming My Cousin Vinny: The Musical., written with original screen writer Dale Launer. He is the creator and co-producer of Neil Berg's 100 Years of Broadway and 50 Years of Rock & Roll, touring and performing over 100 shows a year since 2006. Neil was also one of the lead producers and driving force behind the award-winning 2013 off-Broadway revival of Maltby and Shire's Closer Than Ever at The York Theater. He studied piano/musical composition with Walter Ponce, Robert Printz, and Sue Peters, and is a product of the BMI Workshop, mentored by Maury Yeston and Skip Kennon. His theater songs are featured in various Hal Leonard musical anthologies.

== Professional career ==
=== The 12 ===
Berg is currently the composer/co-lyricist, along with Pulitzer/Tony-winning playwright Robert Schenkkan, of the award-winning rock musical The 12. It opened at the Denver Center in the spring of 2015 to rave reviews, and won the 2015 Henry Award for best new play or musical. In 2018, Tony-award-winning director John Doyle came aboard and directed a successful reading in the fall of 2019 and workshop in the fall of 2019. A national tour was planned for 2021, with a Broadway production to follow, produced by Jersey Boys producer Joseph Grano, Jr. (Sneaky Pete Productions), Jim Orphanidies, Edward Negley, and Leftfield Productions.

In preparation, there was a workshop at the Signature Theater in NYC in June 2013; a showcase at the China Club in NYC, featuring Dan Spitz of Anthrax on lead guitar; a concert world premiere at the Broward Center in Fort Lauderdale, Florida, in April 2010; and a feature at the legendary B.B. King Blues Club in August 2011.

=== The Prince and the Pauper ===
Berg is also the composer/lyricist of the hit off-Broadway musical The Prince and the Pauper, which ran for two years at the Lamb's Theater in New York City. The New York Times said that The Prince and the Pauper "[soars] on wings of theatrical fun,," and AOL Reviews wrote, "A remarkable score [is] sure to delight the young and young at heart!" The original cast CD was released internationally on Jay Records, with sheet music published by Hal Leonard and licensing by Samuel French Inc. Songs from this show are also featured with many other classic songs in the official Off-Broadway Songbook, published by Hal Leonard.

The musical opened at The Lamb's Theater, New York on June 16, 2002. A CD was recorded at Clinton Recording Studios, New York on October 15, 2002. [Dates sourced from the CD's booklet.]

=== Grumpy Old Men ===
Berg is the composer of Grumpy Old Men: The Musical, based on the Warner Brothers movie starring Jack Lemmon and Walter Matthau, which had its US premiere in the summer of 2018 at the Ogunquit Playhouse in Maine to rave reviews. The LA premiere was held in September 2019 at La Mirada Theater, featuring Hal Linden, Cathy Rigby, Ken Page, and Mark Jacoby.

GOM had its original out-of-town tryout at the Royal Manitoba Theatre Centre in Winnipeg in October 2011, starring John Rubenstein and John Conrad Schuck. The developmental readings featured Academy Award-winning actor F. Murray Abraham, Tony Award winner George Hearn, Marilu Henner, Carole Kane, Ken Page, and Vicki Lewis. In May 2017 a new reading was done, featuring Lee Wilkof, John Hilner, Luba Mason, Didi Cohn, Liz Larsen, David Josephsberg, and Rita Harvey. TRW (Theater Rights Worldwide) licenses Grumpy Old Men for professional, stock and amateur productions.

=== Tim and Scrooge ===
Neil's holiday musical Tim and Scrooge, with book and lyrics by Nick Meglin (former editor of Mad Magazine), will be opening December 2015 at the Westchester Broadway Theater in NY. Tim and Scrooge explores what happens ten years after A Christmas Carol, and was voted "one of the best musicals" of the inaugural NYMF festival in NYC, and garnered a glowing review in the NY Times after it opened at The Queens Theater in the Park, starring TONY nominee Bobby Steggert. It was also presented as a special reading at the Criterion Theater in the London's West End. It has been performed regionally across the USA for the past five years.

=== The Man Who Would Be King ===
Neil's musical, The Man Who Would Be King, written with DJ Salisbury, was produced at the NYMF Festival in NYC, and at the University of Buffalo in the fall of 2014. It had a developmental reading/workshop at The Village Theater in Issaquah, WA, directed by Tony Award winner Brian Yorkey (Next To Normal, If/Then). This followed a staged reading at the Rubicon Theater in CA. This show has been developed with dramaturgical guidance by Moises Kaufman of the Tectonic Theater Project. The fully orchestrated CD recording, featuring Brian d'Arcy James, Marc Kudisch and Mandy Gonzalez can be purchased at www.neilberg.com.

=== Neil Berg's 100 Years of Broadway ===
As a Producer, Neil is the creator and co-producer, along with his producing partner, Adam Friedson, of Neil Berg's 100 Years of Broadway, which is now the number one Broadway touring concert in the United States, playing in over 120 cities a year for the past decade. You can find a current schedule at www.neilberg.com.

=== Neil Berg Creator/ Producer ===
Neil's latest concert sensations include Neil Berg’s 50 YEARS OF ROCK & ROLL (currently on National tour in 2019/2020), and Neil Berg’s PIANO MEN (the songs of Elton John and Billy Joel).

=== Other Projects and Awards ===
Neil started his career in his high school years as the leader of "Woody & the Peckers", a comedy rock group, that played original music and lyrics by Neil as well as humorous penned lyrics against some rock standards, e.g. Like Metallica opening with The Ecstasy of Gold - L'Estasi Dell'oro, Neil would open his show with The Peter Gunn Theme with his "long raincoated" - "dark sun-glassed" "Peckers" His creativity shined even then.

Neil is also currently working with writer Jonathan Feldman (Swing Kids movie) and legendary film/ TV Producer Mark Gordon (Grey’s Anatomy, Saving Private Ryan), on a new contemporary fairytale musical called Never Grimm. Never Grimm had its first developmental reading in August 2013 at Santa Rosa Repertory Theater in Northern California. It had its first NYC reading in the fall of 2013, with a developmental workshop scheduled for 2015/16.

Neil also composed the musical Heidi, book by Julia Jordan and commissioned by Douglas Love and the Walden Family Theater. Heidi ran for over eighty performances in its regional premiere in Denver.

His musical Hexed in the City, with book by Tom Mills, played Off-Broadway at the Zipper Theater, produced by The Sonnet Repertory Theater.

Other commissioned works include Percy Penguin for the Penguin Repertory Theater (Joe Brancato, Artistic Director), Threads for the Helen Hayes Theater in Nyack, NY, and False Profits at The Theater Off-Park in NYC.

Many new plays, musicals, and concerts are in the works, including new plays by world renown writer Jordi Galceron.

As a film composer, Neil scored, and was the Musical Supervisor for the 2013 released film Once Upon a Time in Brooklyn, starring Armand Assante, Ice-T and William DeMeo. It was released theatrically by Grindstone, the Independent division of Lions Gate. Neil was also the composer/music supervisor on the feature film Searching For Bobby D featuring Carmen Electra, Sandra Bernhard and Mario Cantone.

Neil was also the recipient of the 1995 Bistro Award for Best Musical for his show Asylum in the Night, a revue of Neil's theater music. Neil had an evening dedicated to his music at Joe's Pub, produced by BroadwayWorld.com, and returned to Feinstein's for a two-week engagement in July 2011 after a sold out performance in 2010. Neil studied musical composition with Robert Printz, Sue Peters, and is a product of The BMI Musical Writer's Workshop, mentored by Maury Yeston and Skip Kennon.

Neil was also one of the lead Producers, and driving force of the Award Winning 2013 Off-Broadway revival of Maltby and Shire's Closer Than Ever, at The York Theater. Neil's guidance brought the show first to Queens Theater in the Park and The Bristol Riverside Theater with original stars, Lynn Wintersteller and Sally Mayes, before recasting the show when it came into NYC, with Christiane Noll, Jenn Colella, George Dvorsky, Sal Viviano, and Rita Harvey. Reviews were some of the strongest in the 2012-2013 NYC theater season, and led to winning the Off-Broadway Alliance Award for Best Musical Revival.

As owner of Leftfield Productions, Inc., an entertainment company based in Nyack, NY, Neil has produced over a thousand Broadway concerts worldwide with such legends as Michael Crawford, Bernadette Peters, Ben Vereen, Audra McDonald, Betty Buckley, Rita Moreno, Donna McKechnie, Brian Stokes Mitchell, Jeremy Jordan, Norm Lewis, Liz Callaway, as well as Alice Ripley, Stephanie Block, Mark Kudisch, Capathia Jenkins and many others.

Neil also produced a concert version of the Broadway musical The Secret Garden, in association with its composer, Lucy Simon. He has also produced concert versions of The Mystery of Edwin Drood (NYC), Chess (John Houseman Theater), and Jesus Christ Superstar.

Neil was the Producing Artistic Director of The Broadway Series at the world-famous China Club in NYC. Over the past 25 years, Neil has been the musical director/entertainment coordinator for such great organizations as Covenant House and The Leukemia Society of America. He has produced countless corporate events all across the world for Goldman Sachs, UBS/Paine Webber, Deloitte Touche, John Hancock, Marriott Corporation, IBM, The United Hospice Organization, The American Red Cross, and many others.

In May 2012, Neil was awarded the Ellis Island Medal of Honor for his artistry and dedication to community service, including helping to raise over $20 million for the homeless youth at Covenant House with his Broadway Concerts. Neil was also honored with the Distinguished Citizen's Award, along with Academy Award Winning actress Ellen Burstyn, by The Rockland Family Shelter, for his efforts on behalf of abused women. Neil was also honored in 2001 as The American Red Cross Man of the Year, and was honored again in 2003 by The United Hospice Foundation. In 2008, Neil was awarded Artist of the Year by the Arts Council of Rockland County.

== Other projects ==
Neil also toured the U.S. with the rock band Joe D'Urso & Stone Caravan and played on their past seven CDs as well as performed with them on the recent 100 Year Anniversary Tour for Harley Davidson. Neil was also heard on radio around the country with his jingle for Shock Coffee.

Neil was the co-owner for many years of the SJR Theater Workshop, a theater camp for students in Montvale, NJ, which instructs over 200 young actors/singers a year. Many actors from his program became notable performers, including Millie Shapiro (TONY Award Winning star of Matilda, and star of film HEREDITARY).

Neil is a member of the Dramatists Guild.

== Personal life ==
Neil was born in the Bronx, but grew up in Rockland County, NY. He attended Tappan Zee High School and SUNY Binghamton, where he was a two-time all SUNYAC baseball player (centerfield). His .416 batting average, from the 1986/87 season, is 5th highest single season batting average in school history. Neil still lives in Rockland County, where he was on the Board of his son’s Little League. Neil recently came out of Baseball “retirement”, and currently plays in an Over 38 Men’s baseball league, and a Sunday morning Softball league. Neil is married to actress and singer Rita Harvey. They have one son, Lucas David Berg.
