= Janet Krupin =

American actress

- Born: October 7, 1987 (age 39); Kennewick, Washington, U.S.
- Education: University of Southern California (BA)
- Occupation: Actress/Singer/Writer/Producer
- Website: janetkrupin.com trilliumtribe.com thejacksonmassive.com

Janet Krupin (born October 7, 1987) is an American actress, singer, writer, and producer. She is best known as a Broadway performer and the original host of the popular web-series "The Click Clique." On Broadway, she originated the role of Kylar in Bring It On: The Musical, and was a swing in the musical If/Then. As a musician, she released her debut EP, Aurora EP, as part of the musical duo Trillium.

== Personal life ==
Krupin was born Janet Ellin Krupin on October 7, 1987, in Kennewick, Washington to Paul and Nancy Krupin. She has a younger sister, Katie.

Krupin graduated from Kennewick High School in 2006 and from the University of Southern California with a Major in Cinematic Arts—Critical Studies and a double minor in Musical Theatre and Philosophy in 2010. Krupin is bisexual and currently resides in Kennewick, WA.

== Career ==
Krupin began performing in community theatres at a young age, and became a 5-time gold medalist and Adjudicators’ Choice at the Northwest Music Festival for her performances. StageSceneLA named her Best Featured Actress In A Musical in 2009 for her performance as Anita in West Side Story and Breakthrough Star of the Year in 2010 for her performances in Bark! The Musical, NeverWonderLand, Janet Krupin at Sterlings Upstairs At Vitello's, and Urinetown (USC). In 2010, she won the LA's Next Great Stage Star competition.

Krupin earned her Equity card in 2010 for her role as the opera-singing poodle, Chanel, in Civic Light Opera of South Bay Cities's Bark! The Musical. Shortly after earning her degree at USC, she was cast in the world premiere production of Bring It On the Musical with music and lyrics by Lin-Manuel Miranda, Tom Kitt, and Amanda Green and book by Jeff Whitty in a lead role, Kylar. Bring It On the Musical premiered at the Alliance Theatre in Atlanta, GA on January 16, 2011, with an opening night of January 28, 2011. It closed on February 20, 2011.

In June 2011, Krupin was named the original host of Teen.com's web-series the Click Clique. After hosting more than twenty episodes of the Click Clique, Krupin briefly left in September 2011 to rehearse for the First National Tour of Bring It On the Musical in New York. While in New York, she continued to contribute remote guest segments. She returned in October 2011 to finish off the first season of the Click Clique as the Bring It On the Musical National Tour opened at the Ahmanson Theatre in Los Angeles on November 11, 2011.

After a five-month tour of the US and Toronto, Canada, Bring It On the Musical transferred to the St. James Theatre on Broadway, where Krupin was one of a record-breaking 30 performers making their Broadway debuts. The Broadway engagement began previews on July 12, 2012, before an August 1, 2012 opening night. The limited engagement was originally scheduled through October 7, 2012 before being extended and finally closing on December 30, 2012.

Just prior to the Bring It On closing, Krupin was cast as the Dance Captain and a Standby for the roles of Heather Stovall and Kelli Mangrum in the Broadway production of Hands on a Hardbody, a new musical with book by Doug Wright, lyrics by Amanda Green, and music by Trey Anastasio and Green. It played at the Brooks Atkinson Theatre from February 23, 2013, to April 13, 2013.

Krupin later appeared in David Cross's feature film directorial debut, Hits, in the role of Megyn after booking the role based on a video taped submission. Hits premiered at the Sundance Film Festival in Park City, UT on January 21, 2014.

Krupin was last seen on Broadway as a swing and understudy for the role of Elena alongside Idina Menzel in the Broadway musical If/Then with book and lyrics by Brian Yorkey and music by Tom Kitt. If/Then played its pre-Broadway premiere at the National Theatre in Washington, DC from November 5, 2013, though December 8, 2013. It played at the Richard Rodgers Theatre, where it began performances on March 5, 2014, prior to a March 30, 2014 opening. If/Then played its final Broadway performance on March 22, 2015.

On July 26, 2014, Krupin released her debut EP, Aurora EP, which she recorded with collaborator Alex Caraballo under the name of Trillium.

From January 27, 2015, through December 18, 2015, Krupin joined the short-run podcast, Backstage with the EDM Assassins where she joined Grant Austin and Nick Pesavento to discuss everything about Electronic dance music.

From August 7, 2015, through August 30, 2015, Krupin was seen as Maureen in the Uncompromising Artistry Productions presentation of Rent at the Edinburgh Festival Fringe in Edinburgh, Scotland. Krupin's If/Then castmate, Anthony Rapp, who originated the role of Mark Cohen, served as a creative consultant for this production.

On October 7, 2016, Krupin released the solo single "Hipster Pinup" on iTunes, Amazon, and other digital music services. Included with the lead track "Ghosted" are "Bradshaw" and "I Don't Wanna."

In 2023, Krupin starred in the musical Lydia and the Troll, which debuted and Seattle's Seattle Rep theater. In 2024, Krupin starred in the indie film Sunset Road, a queer take on Romeo and Juliet.

== Controversies ==
On March 4, 2014, prior to If/Then's final dress rehearsal, Krupin posted to Instagram and Twitter a photo of a satirical insert supposedly intended for the show's Playbills. The insert played on John Travolta's mispronunciation of Idina Menzel's name as "Adele Dazeem" at the Oscars just two days prior. Although the photo was posted as a joke, several news and entertainment outlets picked up the social media posts and reported them as if the insert was genuine. One even erroneously reported that the insert could be seen in "Tweets from the audience," when in fact nothing was handed out to the audience at the invited dress rehearsal, and preview performances did not begin until the next evening.
