= 67th Tony Awards =

2013 US theatrical awards ceremony

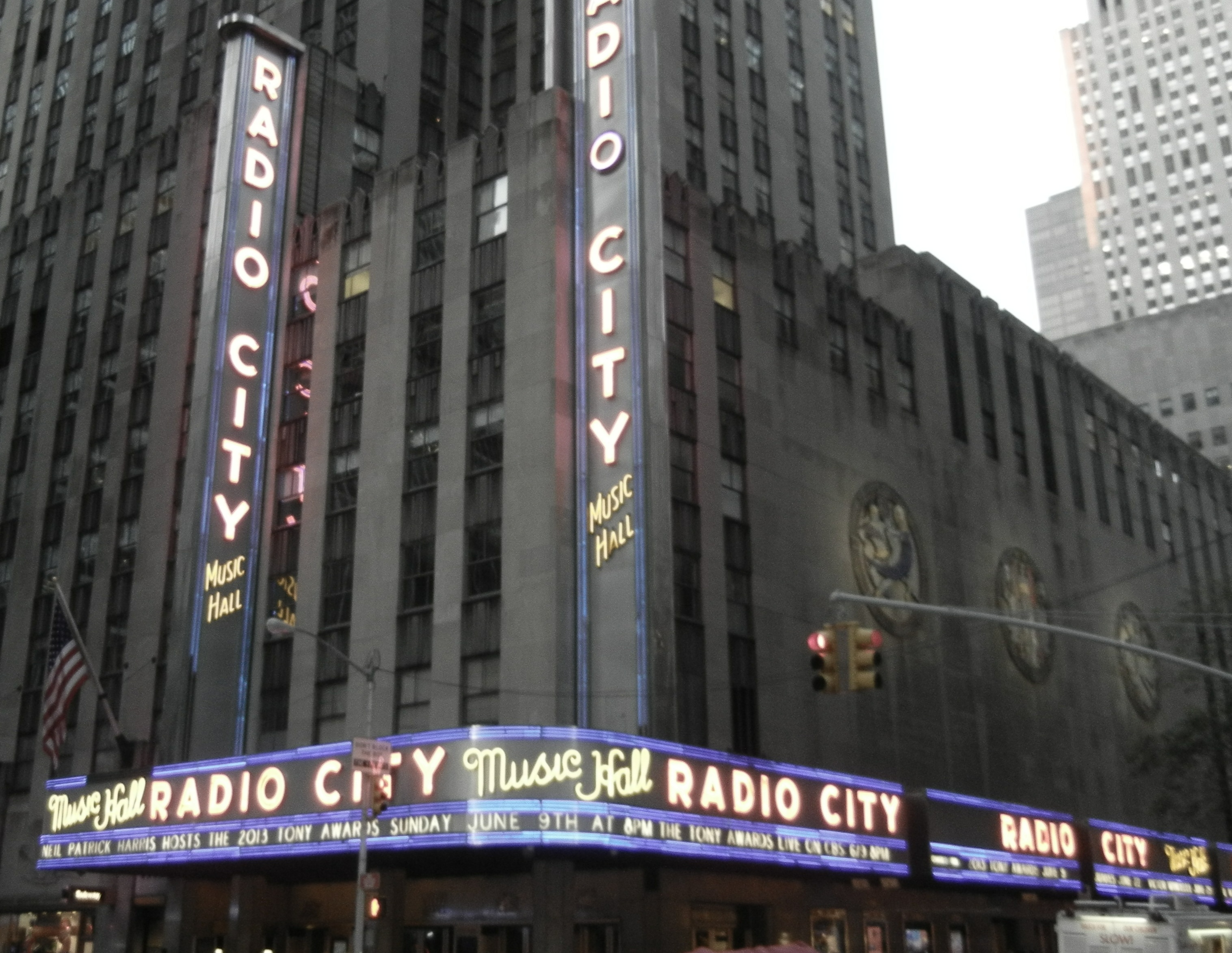
- Date: June 9, 2013
- Location: Radio City Music Hall, New York, New York
- Hosted by: Neil Patrick Harris

Highlights
- Most wins: Kinky Boots (6)
- Most nominations: Kinky Boots (13)
- Website: tonyawards.com

Television/radio coverage
- Network: CBS
- Viewership: 7.2 million
- Produced by: Neil Patrick Harris; Ricky Kirshner; Glenn Weiss
- Directed by: Glenn Weiss

The 67th Annual Tony Awards were held June 9, 2013, to recognize achievement in Broadway productions during the 2012–13 season. The ceremony returned to Radio City Music Hall in New York City, after two years at Beacon Theatre, and was broadcast live on CBS television. Neil Patrick Harris hosted for the third consecutive year, his fourth time as host. Awards in four of the eight acting categories, (Best Actress in a Play, Best Actor in a Musical, Best Actress in a Musical, Best Featured Actor in a Play) were given to African-American performers. Furthermore, it is the second time in Tony history that both directing prizes went to women. Garry Hynes and Julie Taymor had previously won in 1998. Kinky Boots had a season best 13 nominations and 6 awards. Cyndi Lauper, composer of the score for Kinky Boots, is the first solo female winner for Best Original Score.

== Eligibility ==
Shows that opened on Broadway during the 2012–13 season before April 25, 2013 were eligible for consideration.

Original plays

- The Anarchist
- Ann
- The Assembled Parties
- Breakfast at Tiffany's
- Dead Accounts
- Grace
- I'll Eat You Last: A Chat with Sue Mengers
- Lucky Guy
- The Nance
- The Other Place
- The Testament of Mary
- Vanya and Sonia and Masha and Spike

Original musicals

- Bring It On: The Musical
- Chaplin
- A Christmas Story: The Musical
- Hands on a Hardbody
- Kinky Boots
- Matilda the Musical
- Motown: The Musical
- Scandalous: The Life and Trials of Aimee Semple McPherson

Play revivals

- The Big Knife
- Cat on a Hot Tin Roof
- Cyrano de Bergerac
- An Enemy of the People
- Glengarry Glen Ross
- Golden Boy
- Harvey
- The Heiress
- Macbeth
- Orphans
- Picnic
- The Trip to Bountiful
- Who's Afraid of Virginia Woolf?

Musical revivals

- Annie
- Jekyll & Hyde
- The Mystery of Edwin Drood
- Pippin
- Rodgers + Hammerstein's Cinderella

== The ceremony ==
The ceremony featured performances from Tony-nominated musicals in this season:

- Matilda the Musical – medley; "Naughty," "Revolting Children," and "When I Grow Up"
- Bring It On: The Musical – "It's All Happening"
- Rodgers and Hammerstein's Cinderella – "In My Own Little Corner," "Impossible," and "Ten Minutes Ago"
- Motown: The Musical – medley
- Annie – "It's the Hard Knock Life" and "Little Girls"
- A Christmas Story: The Musical – "You'll Shoot Your Eye Out"
- Pippin – medley; "Corner of the Sky" and "Magic to Do"
- Kinky Boots – "Everybody Say Yeah"

The casts of musicals currently running on Broadway introduced the musical nominees, including Chicago; Jersey Boys; Newsies; Once; Mamma Mia!; Rock of Ages; Spider-Man: Turn Off the Dark; and The Lion King. The casts of Once, The Phantom of the Opera, and The Rascals performed.

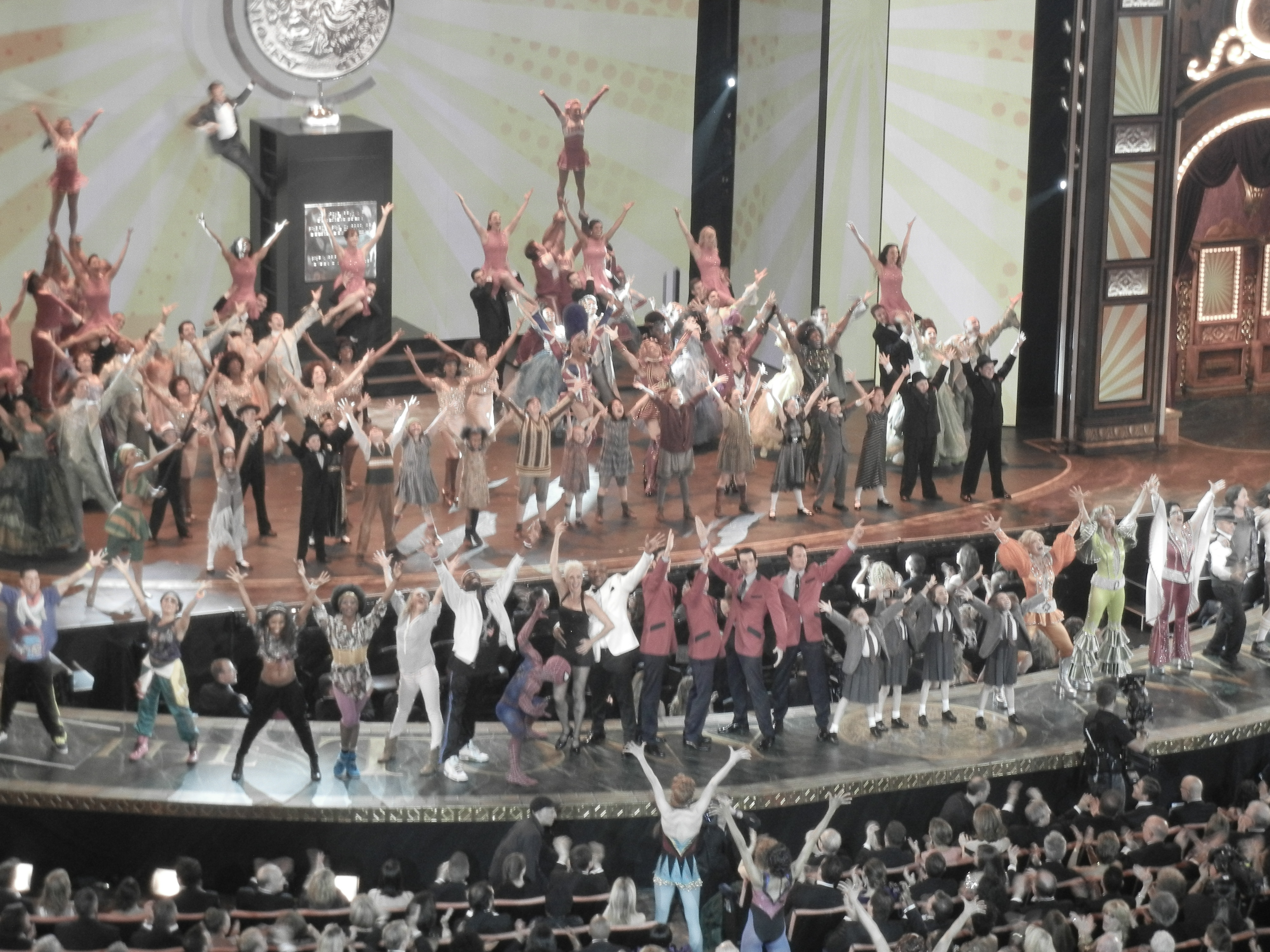
Opening number finale

The Emmy-winning opening number "Bigger!", written by Lin-Manuel Miranda and Tom Kitt, starred Neil Patrick Harris and "featured neophyte cheerleaders, contortionists, chirpy newsies, a scene-hogging Mike Tyson and, in a Broadway season notable for the number of children in its shows, enough pint-size performers to fill, as Harris aptly quipped, a Chuck-E-Cheese." During the ceremony, three Broadway performers, Andrew Rannells, Megan Hilty, and Laura Benanti, whose television shows have been cancelled, sang a comic "failed TV career" medley with Harris. The song was based on several familiar Broadway melodies, including "America", "What I Did For Love", and "The Ladies Who Lunch", with lyrics by Michael John LaChiusa.

During the "In Memoriam" tribute, Cyndi Lauper performed her 1986 hit "True Colors".

The closing number featured Harris and Audra McDonald singing special lyrics to Empire State of Mind, mentioning the winners.

== Nominees and winners ==
The nominees were announced on April 30, 2013. Source for winners: Playbill

Best Play	Best Musical
Vanya and Sonia and Masha and Spike – Christopher Durang; The Assembled Parties – Richard Greenberg; Lucky Guy – Nora Ephron; The Testament of Mary – Colm Tóibín	Kinky Boots; Bring It On: The Musical; A Christmas Story: The Musical; Matilda the Musical
Best Revival of a Play	Best Revival of a Musical
Who's Afraid of Virginia Woolf?; Golden Boy; Orphans; The Trip to Bountiful	Pippin; Annie; The Mystery of Edwin Drood; Rodgers + Hammerstein's Cinderella
Best Performance by a Leading Actor in a Play	Best Performance by a Leading Actress in a Play
Tracy Letts – Who's Afraid of Virginia Woolf? as George; Tom Hanks – Lucky Guy as Mike McAlary; Nathan Lane – The Nance as Chauncey; David Hyde Pierce – Vanya and Sonia and Masha and Spike as Vanya; Tom Sturridge – Orphans as Phillip	Cicely Tyson – The Trip to Bountiful as Miss Carrie Watts; Laurie Metcalf – The Other Place as Juliana Smithton; Amy Morton – Who's Afraid of Virginia Woolf? as Martha; Kristine Nielsen – Vanya and Sonia and Masha and Spike as Sonia; Holland Taylor – Ann as Ann Richards
Best Performance by a Leading Actor in a Musical	Best Performance by a Leading Actress in a Musical
Billy Porter – Kinky Boots as Lola; Bertie Carvel – Matilda the Musical as Miss Trunchbull; Santino Fontana – Rodgers + Hammerstein's Cinderella as Prince Topher; Rob McClure – Chaplin as Charlie Chaplin; Stark Sands – Kinky Boots as Charlie Price	Patina Miller – Pippin as The Leading Player; Stephanie J. Block – The Mystery of Edwin Drood as Edwin Drood / Miss Alice Nutting; Carolee Carmello – Scandalous as Aimee Semple McPherson; Valisia LeKae – Motown: The Musical as Diana Ross; Laura Osnes – Rodgers + Hammerstein's Cinderella as Ella
Best Performance by a Featured Actor in a Play	Best Performance by a Featured Actress in a Play
Courtney B. Vance – Lucky Guy as Hap Hairston; Danny Burstein – Golden Boy as Tokio; Richard Kind – The Big Knife as Marcus Hoff; Billy Magnussen – Vanya and Sonia and Masha and Spike as Spike; Tony Shalhoub – Golden Boy as Mr. Bonaparte	Judith Light – The Assembled Parties as Faye; Carrie Coon – Who's Afraid of Virginia Woolf? as Honey; Shalita Grant – Vanya and Sonia and Masha and Spike as Cassandra; Judith Ivey – The Heiress as Lavinia Penniman; Condola Rashad – The Trip to Bountiful as Thelma
Best Performance by a Featured Actor in a Musical	Best Performance by a Featured Actress in a Musical
Gabriel Ebert – Matilda the Musical as Mr. Wormwood; Charl Brown – Motown: The Musical as Smokey Robinson; Keith Carradine – Hands on a Hardbody as JD Drew; Will Chase – The Mystery of Edwin Drood as John Jasper / Mr. Clive Paget; Terrence Mann – Pippin as King Charles	Andrea Martin – Pippin as Berthe; Annaleigh Ashford – Kinky Boots as Lauren; Victoria Clark – Rodgers + Hammerstein's Cinderella as Marie/Fairy Godmother; Keala Settle – Hands on a Hardbody as Norma Valverde; Lauren Ward – Matilda the Musical as Miss Jennifer "Jenny" Honey
Best Book of a Musical	Best Original Score (Music and/or Lyrics) Written for the Theatre
Matilda the Musical – Dennis Kelly; A Christmas Story: The Musical – Joseph Robinette; Kinky Boots – Harvey Fierstein; Rodgers + Hammerstein's Cinderella – Douglas Carter Beane	Kinky Boots – Cyndi Lauper (music and lyrics); A Christmas Story: The Musical – Benj Pasek and Justin Paul (music and lyrics); Hands on a Hardbody – Trey Anastasio (music) and Amanda Green (music and lyrics); Matilda the Musical – Tim Minchin (music and lyrics)
Best Scenic Design of a Play	Best Scenic Design of a Musical
John Lee Beatty – The Nance; Santo Loquasto – The Assembled Parties; David Rockwell – Lucky Guy; Michael Yeargan – Golden Boy	Rob Howell – Matilda the Musical; Anna Louizos – The Mystery of Edwin Drood; Scott Pask – Pippin; David Rockwell – Kinky Boots
Best Costume Design of a Play	Best Costume Design of a Musical
Ann Roth – The Nance; Soutra Gilmour – Cyrano de Bergerac; Albert Wolsky – The Heiress; Catherine Zuber – Golden Boy	William Ivey Long – Rodgers + Hammerstein's Cinderella; Gregg Barnes – Kinky Boots; Rob Howell – Matilda the Musical; Dominique Lemieux – Pippin
Best Lighting Design of a Play	Best Lighting Design of a Musical
Jules Fisher and Peggy Eisenhauer – Lucky Guy; Donald Holder – Golden Boy; Jennifer Tipton – The Testament of Mary; Japhy Weideman – The Nance	Hugh Vanstone – Matilda the Musical; Kenneth Posner – Rodgers + Hammerstein's Cinderella; Kenneth Posner – Kinky Boots; Kenneth Posner – Pippin
Best Sound Design of a Play	Best Sound Design of a Musical
Leon Rothenberg – The Nance; John Gromada – The Trip to Bountiful; Mel Mercier – The Testament of Mary; Peter John Still and Marc Salzberg – Golden Boy	John Shivers – Kinky Boots; Jonathan Deans and Garth Helm – Pippin; Peter Hylenski – Motown: The Musical; Nevin Steinberg – Rodgers + Hammerstein's Cinderella
Best Direction of a Play	Best Direction of a Musical
Pam MacKinnon – Who's Afraid of Virginia Woolf?; Nicholas Martin – Vanya and Sonia and Masha and Spike; Bartlett Sher – Golden Boy; George C. Wolfe – Lucky Guy	Diane Paulus – Pippin; Scott Ellis – The Mystery of Edwin Drood; Jerry Mitchell – Kinky Boots; Matthew Warchus – Matilda the Musical
Best Choreography	Best Orchestrations
Jerry Mitchell – Kinky Boots; Andy Blankenbuehler – Bring It On: The Musical; Peter Darling – Matilda the Musical; Chet Walker – Pippin	Stephen Oremus – Kinky Boots; Christopher Nightingale – Matilda the Musical; Ethan Popp and Bryan Crook – Motown: The Musical; Danny Troob – Rodgers + Hammerstein's Cinderella

=== Multiple nominations ===
- 13: Kinky Boots and Matilda the Musical
- 10: Pippin
- 9: Rodgers + Hammerstein's Cinderella
- 8: Golden Boy
- 6: Lucky Guy, Vanya and Sonia and Masha and Spike
- 5: The Mystery of Edwin Drood, The Nance, Who's Afraid of Virginia Woolf?
- 4: Motown: The Musical, The Trip to Bountiful
- 3: The Assembled Parties, A Christmas Story: The Musical, Hands on a Hardbody, The Testament of Mary
- 2: Bring It On: The Musical, The Heiress, Orphans

=== Multiple wins ===
- 6: Kinky Boots
- 5: Matilda the Musical
- 4: Pippin
- 3: The Nance, Who's Afraid of Virginia Woolf?
- 2: Lucky Guy

Note: The four child actresses who created the title role in Matilda the Musical were recognized with a special Tony Honor for Excellence in the Theatre giving Matilda the Musical the mentioned 5 wins.

== Non-competitive awards ==
The Special Tony Award for Lifetime Achievement in the Theatre was awarded to Bernard Gersten, executive producer of Lincoln Center Theater; scenic designer Ming Cho Lee; and Paul Libin, executive vice president of Jujamcyn Theaters.

The Tony Honors for Excellence in Theatre was awarded to New York City Mayor Michael Bloomberg, Career Transition For Dancers, William "Bill" Craver, Peter Lawrence (Production Stage Manager) and The Lost Colony (Roanoke Island, Manteo, North Carolina).

The Tony Honors for Excellence in Theatre was given jointly to Sophia Gennusa, Oona Laurence, Bailey Ryon and Milly Shapiro, who share the lead role in Matilda, The Musical. They were not eligible in the Best Performance by an Actress in a Musical category. The Tony Awards Administration Committee stated that they "recognize their outstanding performances this season." The awards were presented at the Tony Eve Cocktail Party, a private cocktail reception, held on June 8, 2013, one day prior to the main ceremony.

Larry Kramer received the Isabelle Stevenson Award. He was "recognized for his work as the co-founder of Gay Men's Health Crisis".

The Huntington Theater Company in Boston, Massachusetts received the Regional Theatre Tony Award.

== In Memoriam ==
During the tribute Cyndi Lauper sang the song True Colors.

- Jean Stapleton
- Richard Adler
- Richard Briers
- Hal David
- Nora Ephron
- Charles Durning
- Bonnie Franklin
- Joan Stein
- Milo O'Shea
- Jack Klugman
- Martin Richards
- Martin Pakledinaz
- Porter Van Zandt
- Virginia Gibson
- Arthur Storch
- Andy Griffith
- Victor Spinetti
- Richard Griffiths
- Gore Vidal
- John Kerr
- Roy Miller
- Mark O'Donnell
- Larry L. King
- Celeste Holm
- Eugene V. Wolsk
- Larry Payton
- Gloria Hope Sher
- Manheim Fox
- Albert Marre
- James Grout
- Sam Crothers
- Marvin Hamlisch

== Broadcast ratings ==
The ceremony's original live broadcast on CBS was watched by 7.3 million viewers and received a 1.2/4 rating/share in the 18-49 demographic. The 2013 viewers increased over the 2012 Tony Awards broadcast, which had approximately 6.01 million viewers.

== See also ==
- Drama Desk Awards
- 2013 Laurence Olivier Awards – equivalent awards for West End theatre productions
- Obie Award
- New York Drama Critics' Circle
- Theatre World Award
- Lucille Lortel Awards
