= Elle McLemore =

American actress

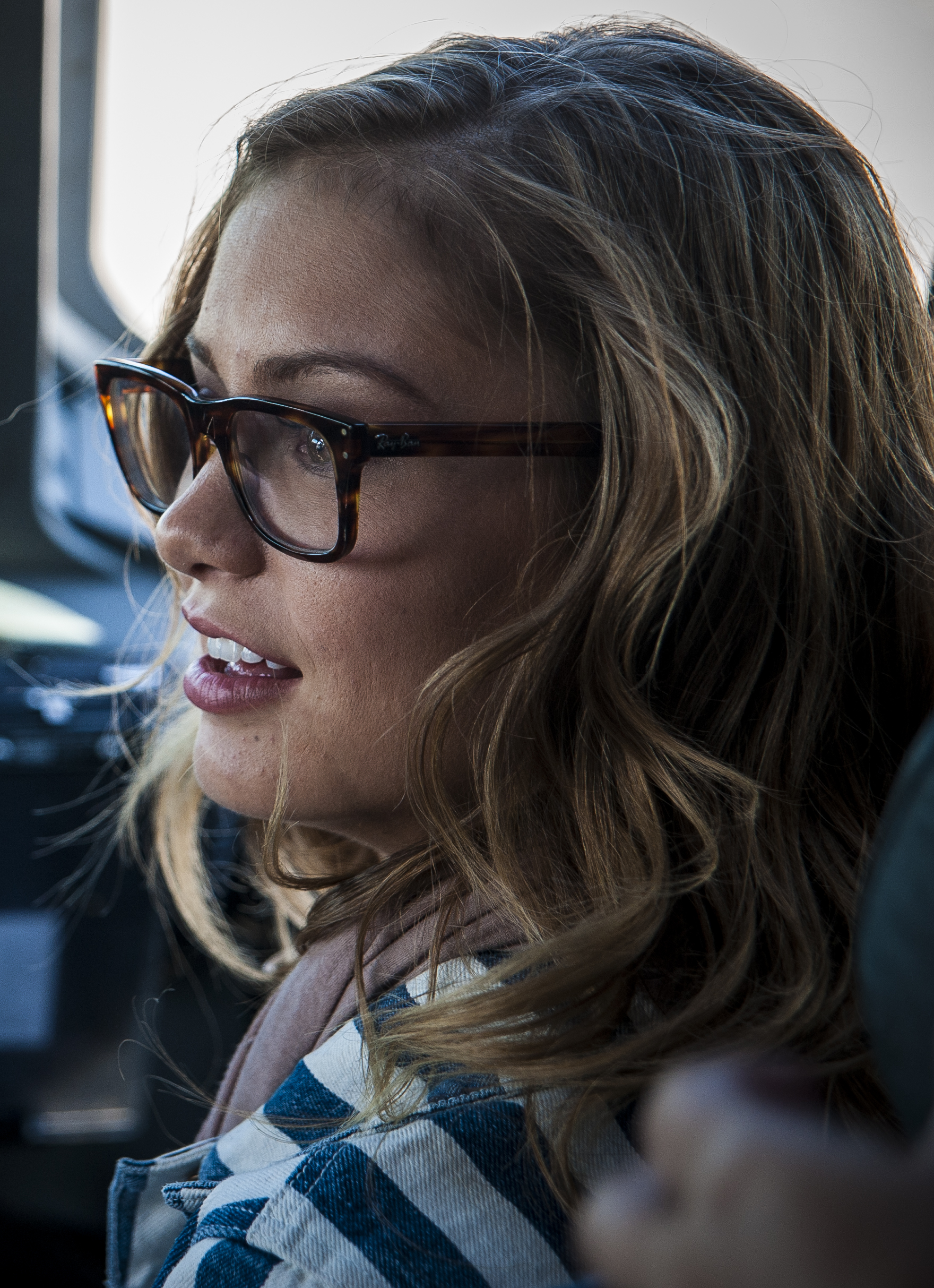
- Elle McLemore in 2013
- Born: Honolulu, Hawaii, U.S.
- Occupation: Actress
- Years active: 2010–present

Elle McLemore is an American actress. She originated the roles of Eva in the Tony-nominated Broadway musical production Bring It On and Heather McNamara in Heathers: The Musical. She also starred in the final season of the television series Army Wives. In 2016, she played Patty Simcox in the TV special Grease: Live.

== Early life ==
McLemore was born in Honolulu, Hawaii to Gail Van Dervoort, a dancer, and Todd Vandervoort, a pyrotechnician. She grew up in Las Vegas, Nevada. She has Irish and Japanese roots. At age four, she toured for 18 months with her family for the Melinda: First Lady of Magic show. Her mother danced on the show and was the magician's assistant while her father did pyrotechnics. She attended Palo Verde High School, where she performed in the school productions Grease and Peter Pan and in the benefit concert God Lives in Glass. She graduated in 2009 and moved to Los Angeles to pursue an acting career.

== Career ==
In 2010, she made her television debut with a guest appearance on Disney Channel's The Suite Life on Deck. She later starred as Jamie Parker in the feature film At the Top of the Pyramid, alongside Dean Cain and Steve Guttenberg.

In 2011, McLemore was cast as Eva, the show's villain, in the first national tour of Bring It On: The Musical. The production, directed and choreographed by Andy Blankenbuehler, featured music by Tom Kitt (musician) and Lin-Manuel Miranda and lyrics by Amanda Green. The 13-city national tour transferred to Broadway's St. James Theatre in 2012, with McLemore continuing in the role, making her broadway debut. McLemore's performance as Eva received positive critical attention. She was described as “outstanding” as well as a “singing, acting, dancing dynamo." Other reviews called her a standout and praised her ability to transform Eva from an innocent character into a villain. McLemore appeared on the original Broadway cast recording of Bring It On: The Musical, performing "Killer Instinct", and "Eva's Rant". The cast also performed in the 2012 Macy's Thanksgiving Day Parade.

McLemore was cat as a series regular Holly Truman for the seventh and final season of Lifetime's Army Wives. Her husband was played by Jesse McCartney.

In 2013, McLemore was cast as Heather McNamara in the Los Angeles production of Heathers: The Musical, before reprising the role in the 2014 Off-Broadway production at New World Stages. She originated the role in the world-premiere production and was featured on the original cast recording, including the solo "Lifeboat". Her performance received positive reviews, with critics highlighting her comedic timing and vocals. The world-premiere cast recording was later certified Gold by the Recording Industry Association of America (RIAA).

In 2016, McLemore was cast as Patty Simcox in Fox's live television musical Grease: Live!. McLemore's performance as Patty was praised by critics, with Variety describing her performance as “simply terrific.”

In 2024, McLemore expanded into digital media, producing and directing the travel documentary series Lost & Found in Japan, which follows her travels through Tokyo, Kyoto, and Okinawa and explores her Japanese heritage.

In 2026, McLemore launched a digital talk show The Elle McLemore Show! featuring interviews and entertainment segments. Its debut guest was her former Heathers: The Musical co-star Barrett Wilbert Weed, marking a reunion of original Heathers cast members more than a decade after the show's original production. The show has also featured McLemore's former Bring It On: The Musical co-star Taylor Louderman.

== Stage credits ==
Year	Title	Role	Theatre	Notes
2011–2012	Bring It On	Eva	Various	Pre-Broadway National Tour
2012	Bring It On	Eva	St. James Theatre	Broadway Debut
2013	Heathers	Heather McNamara	Hudson Backstage Theatre	LA Premiere
2014	Heathers	Heather McNamara	New World Stages	Off-Broadway

== Personal life ==
McLemore married Josh Levinson in September 2021 in the Santa Ynez Valley, Santa Barbara County, California in a wedding featured in People Magazine.

== Filmography ==
Year	Title	Role	Notes
2010	The Suite Life on Deck	Gina	Episode "My Oh Maya"
2010	The Middle	Denise	Episode "Halloween"
2011	Los Americans	Courtney	Episodes "Happy Birthday", "The Legacy"
2013	Army Wives	Holly Truman	Series regular (Season 7)
2014	At the Top of the Pyramid	Jamie Parker	
2016	Grease: Live	Patty Simcox	Television musical
