= Ryann Redmond =

American actress and singer

- Born: Georgia, U.S.
- Education: NYU Tisch School of the Arts
- Occupations: Actress; singer
- Years active: 2009–present
- Website: ryannredmond.com

Ryann Kirby Redmond is an American actress and singer known for originating the role of Bridget in Bring It On: The Musical. She performed on Broadway in the musical If/Then, which closed on March 22, 2015, and became the first female actor to portray Olaf in Frozen on Broadway in 2019.

== Personal life ==
Born and raised in Alpharetta and Cumming, Georgia, she is the daughter of Andrea (Elvey) and Webb Redmond, a former marine and police officer. Her parents are divorced, both remarried, and she has six siblings/step siblings between them. She attended South Forsyth High School where she was involved with theatre. In 2006, she won a Breakthrough Performance Award at the Georgia One-Act competition. After graduating, she studied musical theatre in the CAP21 program at New York University's Tisch School of the Arts on a full scholarship, but she left college when she was cast in Bring It On: The Musical.

== Career ==
In 2010, Redmond performed as Alice in the Elizabeth Swados musical Alice at the Palace. Meryl Streep had played Alice in the original Off-Broadway production. She also performed in Swados' musical Books Cook!, earning standout reviews. Redmond continued to participate in Broadway Dreams Foundation workshops, and in 2011 while she was performing at a NY Benefit, Bernie Telsey admired her talent and asked her to come in the next day to read for Bridget in Bring It On: The Musical. Redmond landed the role and participated in the initial reading, NY Workshop, World Premiere in Atlanta, and the National Tour across the US and Canada.

In 2012, she made her Broadway debut in Bring It On: The Musical, which opened August 1, 2012, and closed December 30, 2012. The musical was nominated for the Tony Award for Best Musical. While touring with the show, Redmond was nominated for various awards for her performance, including Best Featured Performer in a Musical by the Los Angeles Drama Critics Circle. In 2014, she originated the role of Paulette in the musical If/Then which opened March 30, 2014 on Broadway starring Idina Menzel.

In 2015, Redmond starred in the Vineyard Theatre's Off-Broadway production of Gigantic, which premiered on December 3, 2015.

She has held multiple sold-out concerts at 54 Below.

It was announced on January 15, 2019 that Redmond would take over the role of Olaf in the Broadway production of Frozen as of February 19. She is the first woman to perform the role. However, due to the COVID-19 pandemic, all Broadway theatres were closed on March 12, 2020. Disney later announced Frozen would not reopen after the lockdown was lifted.

In April 2023, it was announced that Redmond would be playing Belinda in the original Broadway cast of Once Upon a One More Time.

== Credits ==
=== Film ===
- Borderlands - Ellie (2024), dir. Eli Roth

=== Theatre ===
Broadway

- Bring It On - Bridget (2012), dir. Andy Blankenbuehler
- If/Then - Paulette and others (2014–2015), dir. Michael Greif
- Escape to Margaritaville - Ensemble/Tammy (understudy) (2018), dir. Christopher Ashley
- Frozen (musical) - Olaf, (2019), dir. Michael Grandage
- Once Upon a One More Time - Belinda (2022), dir. Keone Madrid and Mari Madrid

Off-Broadway

- Gigantic, Taylor (2015)

Tour/Regional

- Bring It On - Bridget (2011), dir. Andy Blankenbuehler, National Tour
- Hairspray - Tracy Turnblad (2015), dir. Dan Knechtges, at The Muny
- Legally Blonde - Enid Hoopes (2016), dir. Michael Heitzman, at Music Circus
- Escape to Margaritaville - Ensemble/Tammy (understudy) (2017), dir. Christopher Ashley
- Regency Girls - Petunia (2025) dir. Josh Rhodes

Other Theatre

- String, Clotho (Reading)
- Zombies on Broadway, Gertrude/Melissa (Reading)
- Girls Just Wanna Have Fun, Harriet (Reading)
- City Of, Cammie (Reading)
- If/Then, Paulette and others, (2013), Washington D.C. tryout
- Too True to Be Good, Mops, workshop
- High Fidelity Reunion, Singer
- Coney Island Christmas, Evie Slotnik (Reading)
- Rockwell: Life on a Palette, Jill (Reading)
- Bring it On, Bridget, Atlanta tryout
- Books Cook! A Children's Vaudeville, Pigeon, Atlantic Theatre Company
- The House of Bernarda Alba, Prudencia, Playwrights Horizons

=== TV ===
- Local Attraction, Tracy (web series), dir. Connor Hines
- Cheer Factor Video Blog, Self (Broadway.com Show)
- Younger, Dora, 1 episode

=== Concerts ===
- 54 Below, March/September 2015

== Awards and nominations ==
- 2011 Atlanta Theatre Fan Award for Best Featured Actress in a Musical for Bring It On (nominated)
- 2011 Suzi Bass Award for Best Featured Actress in a Musical for Bring It On (nominated)
- 2011 Los Angeles Drama Critics Circle Award for Best Featured Actress in a Musical for Bring It On (nominated)
- 2011 BroadwayWorld Atlanta Award for Best Actress in a Musical (Professional) for Bring It On (won)
- 2011 LA Ticketholder Award for Best Supporting Actress in a Musical for Bring It On (won)
- 2012 Back Stage Garland Award for Best Performance in a Musical for Bring It On (won)
