= Jon Rua =

American actor, singer, and choreographer (born 1983)

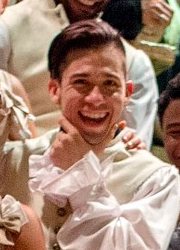
- Rua in 2015
- Born: August 14, 1983 (age 43); Elizabeth, New Jersey, USA
- Education: Rutgers University
- Occupation: Actor • choreographer • singer • dancer • writer
- Movement: TheGrit
- Parents: Elibanier 'Marco' Rua (father); Maria Nohelia Castañeda Cano (mother)

Jonathan Rua is an American actor, dancer, choreographer, singer, and writer, best known for his roles in Broadway musicals such as Hamilton, In the Heights, The SpongeBob Musical, and Hands on a Hardbody.

Rua was the choreographer for dance sequences in the 2025 Lincoln Center Theater Broadway production of Floyd Collins and served as an associate choreographer for the 2025 Broadway musical Boop! the Musical.

== Early life ==
Rua was born in Elizabeth, New Jersey and grew up in nearby Linden. His parents, Maria Nohelia Castañeda Cano and Elibanier "Marco" Rua, were both immigrants from Colombia.

Rua graduated in 2001 from Linden High School, where he participated in the marching band and musical theatre. He received a B.A. in Communication and Public Relations from Rutgers University. During Rua's college years, he attended his first dance class, and later started teaching dance to younger students.

== Career ==
After college, Rua joined a dance company as an unpaid commitment, and eventually became a professional dancer doing live performance, music video work. He danced for Mariah Carey, Don Omar, Soulja Boy, Target, Billboard, Puma, Reebok, IBM, and Panasonic. Rua then transitioned into musical theatre and acting.

Rua made his Broadway debut in 2008 as a swing in Lin-Manuel Miranda's musical In the Heights, later becoming the replacement for Sonny and Graffiti Pete. He stepped into the leading role of Usnavi several times as understudy.

As an original Broadway cast member of Hamilton in 2015, Rua originated the role of Charles Lee and performed in the ensemble, which he plays in the Hamilton movie on Disney+. On December 20, 2015, Rua became the third performer to take on the title role of Alexander Hamilton on Broadway, as Miranda's understudy. Rua left Hamilton on June 29, 2016, and briefly returned in February 2017 again as the understudy. Jon also originated the roles of 'Jesus Pena' in Hands on a Hardbody and 'Patchy the Pirate' in The SpongeBob Musical. Rua's off-Broadway and regional theater credits include: The Hombres, ¿ Kung Fu, Elaborate Entrance of Chad Deity, Somewhere, West Side Story, Pirates, In the Heights, and Damn Yankees at NYCC Encores.

His film & television credits include guest star and supporting roles in Smile 2, The Blacklist, Blue Bloods, Law & Order. He also appeared in the televised version of the SpongeBob SquarePants: The Broadway Musical, which is currently on the Paramount+ streaming app. In 2025, Rua joined the original cast of Hamilton to perform on the 78th Tony Awards.

Rua's choreographer career has focused on originating new work as well as reinvigorating past musicals. He has choreographed the world premieres of The Unauthorized Untitled Hunter S. Thompson Musical, 3 Summers of Lincoln, The Hombres, as well as regional producer for Macbeth, Rent, Godspell, Aida, Jesus Christ Superstar, amongst other workshops of developmental musicals. He worked as the specialty choreographer/assistant for Broadway's The Cher Show and The SpongeBob Musical, as well as the rom-com Isn't it Romantic.

Rua became a co-creative director, and a choreographer for PHISH New Year's Eve Show at Madison Square Garden in 2019-2020 with 'Send in the Clones'. He has also made music videos and commercials for Coheed & Cambria ("Old Flames"), Lawrence ('More"), and the New York Lotto.

Rua is an associate choreographer for Boop! The Musical, which started performances on March 11, 2025, and officially opened on April 5th. As well as the choreographer for dance sequences for Floyd Collins, which started performances on March 18th, 2025, and officially opened on April 21st.

== Educator/"movement director" career ==
Rua teaches dancers of all levels through workshops. Most recently, Rua put on a dance workshop in 2021 as a "movement director" on the SS Neverender, a cruise for the band Coheed & Cambria, to the song In Keeping Secrets of Silent Earth 3. Rua also led an advanced hip hop workshop at BroadwayCon in 2016.

== Awards and recognitions ==
Other awards:

- 2025 nominee Tony Awards for Best Choreography for Boop! The Musical as an Associate Choreographer
- 2022 SDCF Breakout Award
- 2019 nominee Chita Rivera Awards for Film Nominations as Assistance Choreographer in "Isn't it Romantic"
- 2018 nominee Fred Astaire Awards for Outstanding Ensemble in SpongeBob SquarePants
- 2016 nominee Fred Astaire Awards for Outstanding Ensemble in Hamilton
- 2016 Winner Tony Awards for Best Musical for Hamilton
- 2016 Winner Grammy Awards for Best Musical Album for Hamilton
- 2014 finalist for the Capezio Award for Choreographic Excellence
- 2011 nominee for the Craig Noel Award for "Outstanding Lead Performance in a Play, Male" in Somewhere (Old Globe)

== Credits ==
=== Theatrical credits ===
==== Broadway ====
Title	Role	Details	Notes
Floyd Collins	-	Vivian Beaumont Theatre	Choreographer
Boop! The Musical	-	Broadhurst Theatre	Associate Choreographer
The Cher Show	-	Neil Simon Theatre	Co-Choreographer for "Believe"
SpongeBob SquarePants: The Broadway Musical	Patchy the Pirate and Ensemble (2017–2018)	Palace Theatre	Actor, Co-Choreographer for "WTGGT"
Hamilton	Charles Lee and Ensemble (2015-2016); Alexander Hamilton (s/b 2017; u/s 2015–2016)	Richard Rodgers Theatre, Thomas Kail, Andy Blankenbuehler	Actor
Hands on a Hardbody	Jesus Peña	Neil Pepe, Sergio Trujillo	Actor
In the Heights	Graffiti Pete Sonny, Usnavi (u/s)	Richard Rodgers Theatre, Thomas Kail, Andy Blankenbuehler	Actor

==== Off-Broadway ====
Title	Role	Details	Notes
Hamilton	Charles Lee / Ensemble	Public Theatre/Thomas Kail	Actor
Kung Fu	Matthew, Barry, Fung Fung, etc.	Signature Theatre, Leigh Silverman	Actor
The Elaborate Entrance of Chad Deity	Mace (understudy)	Second Stage Theatre, Eddie Torres	Actor
In The Heights	Sonny/Graffiti Pete; u/s Usnavi	Tommy Kail/A. Blankenbuehler	Actor
Damn Yankees	Ensemble	New York City Center, John Rando	Actor

==== Regional ====
Title	Role	Details	Notes
Hands on a Hardbody	Jesus Peña	La Jolla Playhouse, Neil Pepe	Actor, Choreographer
3 Summers of Lincoln	Co-Choreographer	La Jolla Playhouse	World Premier
BOOP! The Musical	Associate Choreographer	CIBC Theater	World Premier
Hunter S. Thompson Musical	Choreographer	La Jolla Playhouse	World Premier
Macbeth	Choreographer	Oregon Shakespeare Festival	
Rent	Choreographer	Oregon Shakespeare Festival	
The Hombres	Beto/Choreographer	Two River Theater	World Premier
Godspell	Choreographer	POLO	
Jesus Christ Superstar	Choreographer	The	
Aida	Choreographer	The Muny	
Hands on a Harbody	Jesus Pena	La Jolla Playhouse	Actor, World Premier
Somewhere	Alejandro Candelaria	The Old Globe, Giovanna Sardelli	Actor (Craig Noel Leading Actor Nominee)
Bring It On: The Musical	Twig	Universal Studios and Beacon Pictures, Andy Blankenbuehler	World Premier
West Side Story	Chino	The Muny, Gordon Greenberg	Actor
Pirates	Samuel	The Muny, Gordon Greenberg	Actor

=== Film ===
Title	Role	Details	Notes
Smile 2	Anton	Directed by Parker Finn	Actor
Hamilton	Charles Lee / Ensemble	Directed by Thomas Kail	Actor
Fall to Rise	Magic	Directed by Jayce Bartok	Actor
First Reformed	Repairman	Directed by Paul Schrader	Actor
The Things We Do They Don't Understand	Eduardo	Directed by Ashley Michel Hoban	Actor
Isn't It Romantic	Dancer	Directed by Todd Strauss-Schulson	Assistant Choreographer
In the Heights	Background vocals	Directed by Jon M. Chu	

=== Television ===
Title	Role	Details	Notes
The Blacklist	Guest-Star	NBC/Dir. Bill Roe	Actor
Blue Bloods	Guest-Star	CBS/Dir. Alex Zakrzewski	Actor
The SpongeBob Musical: Live on Stage	Krabby Patty	Nickelodeon	Actor
Law & Order: "Bailout"	Co-Star	NBC Universal, Dir. Jean De Segonzac	Actor
Celebrity Wife Swap	Self	ABC Network	Choreographer
Marcy Place feat. Don Omar	Co-Star	Orfanato Music Group, Chor. Bam Bam	Actor
Verizon Commercial	Security Guard	National Television	Actor

=== Stage and concerts ===
Title	Role	Details	Notes
Lawrence	Choreographer, Dancer	Terminal 5	performance of "More"
T.A.B.	Creative Director/Choreographer	The Beacon Jams 2020	The Beacon Theater
Phish	Choreographer, Dancer	Fall Tour 2013, Atlantic City	
Mariah Carey	Dancer	NBC Universal, Chor. Bam Bam	Dancer
Soulja Boy	Dancer	Chor. Mark Martinez, YouTube NYC	Dancer

=== Commercials and music videos ===
Title	Role	Details	Notes
Old Flames	Choreographer, Dancer	Roadrunner Records, Coheed and Cambria	Music Video
Hands on a Hardbody	Jesus Peña	LSerino, Coyne Productions	Actor, Commercial
Bring It On: The Musical	Twig	Universal Studios and Beacon Pictures	Commercial
Marcy Place feat. Don Omar	Dancer, Featured Actor	Orfanato Music Group, Chor. Bam Bam	Music Video
Target Industrial	Principal Dancer, Actor	Dir: Vivian Rosenthal	Industrial
In the Heights	Dancer	Bunker Prod. Co., Warren Fischer	Broadway Commercial

Readings and Workshops

Title	Role	Details
Eighty Sixed	Richard	Sam Salmond, Jeremy King
Rivers/Cross: What Becomes An Urban Legend Most?	Oscar	Lonny Price, David Parr
Magic Mike	Tito	Brian Yorkey, Tom Kitt
American Pop	As cast	New York Stage & Film, Michael Friedman
The Solid Sand Below	Flores	Atlantic Theatre Company, Martin Zimmerman
Queen of the Stardust Ballroom	Fernando	Jerry Mitchell, Marvin Hamlisch
Ever After	Gustave	Dir. Susan V. Booth
Bread and Roses	Ruben	NYMF FESTIVAL 2016
Hamilton	As Cast, Jefferson/Burr	Public Theater/Dir. Tommy Kail
Hands on a Hardbody	Jesus	Neil Pepe, Doug Wright
Kingdom	Andres	Public Theater
Fly	Lotty	Jeffrey Seller, Bill Sherman
Paperdolls	Jiorgio	Sundance Theater, Mark Brokaw
Stuck Elevator/Like Water for Chocolate	Principal	Sundance Theater Lab
Bare	Lucas	Stafford Arima, Lynne Shanke
