= Steve Guttenberg on screen and stage =

Steve Guttenberg
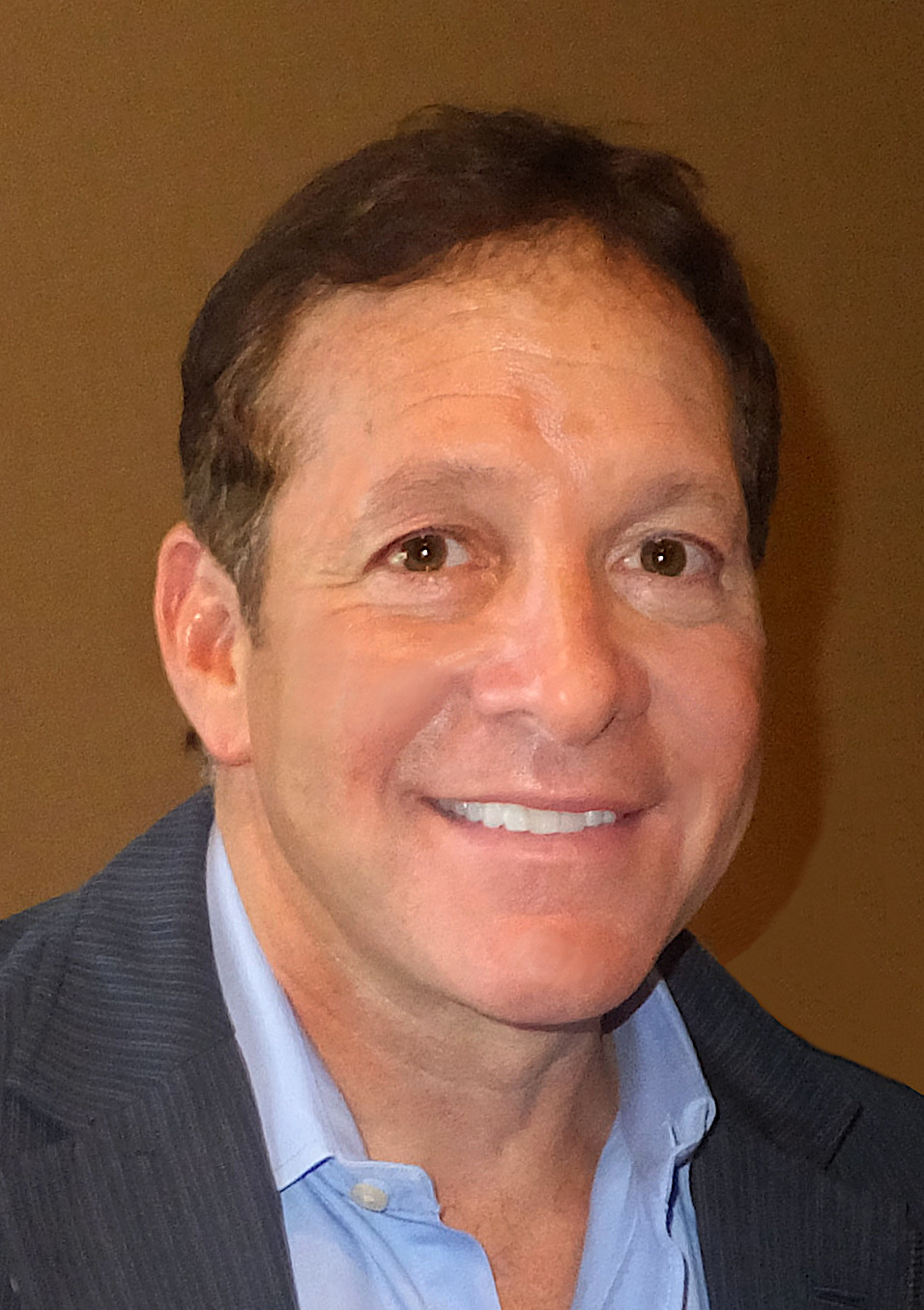
- Guttenberg in October 2013
- Born: Steven Robert Guttenberg; August 24, 1958 (age 68); Brooklyn, New York City, U.S.
- Years active: 1977–present

Steve Guttenberg is an American actor, author, businessman, producer, and director. He is known for his lead roles in Hollywood films of the 1980s and 1990s, including Cocoon, Police Academy, Three Men and a Baby, Diner, The Bedroom Window, Three Men and a Little Lady, The Big Green, and Short Circuit.

== Filmography ==
=== Film ===
Year	Title	Role	Notes	Ref.
1977	Rollercoaster	Messenger	Uncredited	
1977	The Chicken Chronicles	David Kessler	Credited as Steven Guttenberg	
1978	The Boys from Brazil	Barry Kohler	Credited as Steven Guttenberg	
1979	Players	Rusty	Credited as Steven Guttenberg	
1980	Can't Stop the Music	Jack Morell		
1982	Diner	Edward 'Eddie' Simmons		
1983	The Man Who Wasn't There	Sam Cooper		
1984	Police Academy	Carey Mahoney		
1985	Police Academy 2: Their First Assignment	Carey Mahoney		
1985	Cocoon	Jack Bonner		
1985	Bad Medicine	Jeff Marx		
1986	Police Academy 3: Back in Training	Sergeant Carey Mahoney		
1986	Short Circuit	Newton Crosby		
1987	The Bedroom Window	Terry Lamdbert		
1987	Police Academy 4: Citizens on Patrol	Carey Mahoney		
1987	Amazon Women on the Moon	Jerry	Credited as Steven Guttenberg	
1987	Surrender	Marty Caesar		
1987	Three Men and a Baby	Michael Kellam		
1988	High Spirits	Jack Crawford		
1988	Cocoon: The Return	Jack Bonner		
1990	Don't Tell Her It's Me	Gus Kubicek		
1990	Three Men and a Little Lady	Michael Kellam		
1995	The Big Green	Sheriff Tom Palmer		
1995	Home for the Holidays	Walter Wedman		
1995	It Takes Two	Roger Callaway		
1997	Zeus and Roxanne	Terry Barnett		
1997	Casper: A Spirited Beginning	Tim Carson		
1998	Airborne	Bill McNeil		
1998	Overdrive	Matt Stricker		
1998	Home Team	Henry Butler		
2002	P.S. Your Cat Is Dead!	Jimmy Zoole	Also director, producer, and writer	
2003	The Stranger	The Stranger	Short film	
2005	Domino One	Casey		
2006	Mojave Phone Booth	Barry		
2008	Jackson	Businessman		
2008	Private Valentine: Blonde & Dangerous	Sidney Green		
2009	Fatal Rescue	Jacob Jones		
2009	Shannon's Rainbow	Ed		
2009	The Gold Retrievers	Wade Black		
2009	Heidi 4 Paws	Sebastian	Voice	
2009	Help Me, Help You	Steve		
2009	Cornered!	Morty		
2010	Ay Lav Yu	Christopher		
2010	Duckwalls	Mickey Beasn	Short film	
2011	A Novel Romance	Nate Shepard	Also executive producer	
2012	Highway to Hell	JJ		
2012	I Heart Shakey	Stubbs		
2012	Making Change	Trafton	Also executive producer	
2013	Quick to Duck	Mickey Beans		
2014	Affluenza	Philip Miller		
2014	At the Top of the Pyramid	Principal Dickson		
2015	A Man Before His Time	Narrator	Documentary; voice	
2015	Running on Empathy		Short film	
2016	Lookin' Up	Edgar		
2016	Alternative Universe: A Rescue Mission	Verstag		
2017	Ay Lav Yu Tuu	Christopher		
2017	Chasing the Blues	Dan McKenna		
2017	After Party	Alan		
2018	Miss Arizona	Gary		
2018	Bigger	Louis Weider		
2018	Lez Bomb	Mike		
2018	Hangover in Death Valley	JJ		
2019	Heckle	Ray Kelly		
2019	Trauma Center	Dr. Jones		
2020	Rifkin's Festival	Jake Rifkin		
2020	Original Gangster	Jean-Baptiste Philippe		
2020	Roe v. Wade	Justice Powell		
2026	Broad Trip	Wayne		
2026	American Summer	Older Mikey		
TBA	The Decline of Fucking Western Civilization		Filming	
TBA	The Dybbuk	Rabbi Azrael	Post-production	

=== Television ===
Year	Title	Role	Notes	Ref.
1977	Something for Joey	Mike Cappelletti	Television film	
1979	Family	Philip	Episode: "An Apple for the Teacher"	
1979	Billy	Billy Fisher	8 episodes	
1980	To Race the Wind	Harold Krents	Television film	
1980	Magic Night	Himself	Television film	
1981	Miracle on Ice	Jim Craig	Television film	
1982	No Soap, Radio	Roger	5 episodes	
1983	The Day After	Stephen Klein	Television film; credited as Steven Guttenberg	
1984	The Ferret	Sam Valenti	Television film	
1986	Tall Tales & Legends	Pecos Bill	Episode: "Pecos Bill"	
1986	Saturday Night Live	Himself (host)	Episode: "Steve Guttenberg/The Pretenders"	
1988	CBS Schoolbreak Special		Executive producer (episode: "Gangs")	
1990	The Joan Rivers Show	Himself (guest)	Episode: "9.18.1990"	
1991	48th Golden Globe Awards	Himself (host)	TV special	
1993	CBS Schoolbreak Special	Tom Hardgrove	Also director Episode: "Love Off Limits"	
1997	Tower of Terror	Buzzy Crocker	Television film	
2004	Rocket Power	Billie Joe	Voice, episode: "Island of the Menehune"	
2004	Single Santa Seeks Mrs. Claus	Nick Claus	Television film	
2005	The Poseidon Adventure	Richard Clarke	Television film	
2005	Meet the Santas	Nick Claus	Television film	
2005–2006	Veronica Mars	Woody Goodman	8 episodes	
2007	Law & Order: Criminal Intent	Clay Darren, Sr.	Episode: "Courtship"	
2008	Dancing with the Stars	Himself (contestant)	7 episodes (season 6)	
2008	According to Jim	Himself	Episode: "Two for the Money"	
2010	Party Down	Himself	Episode: "Steve Guttenberg's Birthday"	
2012	Watch What Happens: Live	Himself (guest)	Episode: "Steven Guttenberg/Joey Lawrence"	
2015	Sons of Liberty	Jack Bonner	Miniseries; Episode: "A Dangerous Game"	
2015	Community	Maury	Episode: "Intro to Recycled Cinema"	
2015	The Mysteries of Laura	Himself	Episode: "The Mystery of the Deceased Documentarian"	
2015	Lavalantula	Colton West	Television film	
2016	Sharknado 4: The 4th Awakens	Colton West	Television film	
2016	2 Lava 2 Lantula!	Colton West	Television film	
2017	The Other F Word	Professor George Mueller	2 episodes	
2017	Ballers	Wayne Hastings, Jr.	8 episodes	
2019–2023	The Goldbergs	Dr. Katman	7 episodes	
2019	Schooled	Dr. Katman	Episode: "Hakuna Matata"	
2020	Last Week Tonight with John Oliver	Himself	1 episode	
2020	Into the Dark	Don	Episode: "Good Boy"	
2023	How to Murder Your Husband: The Nancy Brophy Story	Daniel Brophy	Television film	
2025	High Potential	Phil Elko	Episode: "The RAMs"	
2025	Paper Empire	Saul	Pilot	
2025	Kidnapped by a Killer: The Heather Robinson Story	John Edward Robinson	Television film	
2025	Now We Know!	Himself (host)		

=== Music videos ===
Year	Title	Role	Notes	Ref.
1989	"Liberian Girl"	Himself	artist: Michael Jackson	

=== Dancing with the Stars ===
==== Season 6 performances ====
Week#	Dance / Song	Judge's scores			Result	Ref.
Week#	Dance / Song	Inaba	Goodman	Tonioli	Result	Ref.
1	Foxtrot / "(Up a) Lazy River"	6	6	6	No Elimination	
2	Mambo / "I Got a Girl"	6	5	5	Safe	
3	Tango / "Jalousie"	7	7	7	Eliminated	

== Theatre ==
Year	Title	Role	Notes	Ref.
1990	Prelude to a Kiss	Peter Hoskins	Helen Hayes Theatre	
1990	The Boys Next Door	Jack Palmer	Comedy Theatre in London, England	
1990	Furthest From the Sun	Zach		
2011–2012	Relatively Speaking	Jerry Spector	Brooks Atkinson Theatre	
2023	Gutenberg! The Musical!	Producer	James Earl Jones Theatre	
