= Bring It On: The Musical =

Musical

Bring It On
- The Musical
- Official Playbill for the Broadway production
- Music: Tom Kitt; Lin-Manuel Miranda
- Lyrics: Amanda Green; Lin-Manuel Miranda
- Book: Jeff Whitty
- Basis: Bring It On by Jessica Bendinger
- Productions: 2011 Atlanta; 2011 US National Tour; 2012 Broadway; 2014 Non-Equity Tour; 2018 Off West End; 2021 UK Tour

Bring It On: The Musical is a musical with music by Tom Kitt and Lin-Manuel Miranda, lyrics by Amanda Green and Miranda, and book by Jeff Whitty. The musical, loosely based on the 2000 film of the same name written by Jessica Bendinger, focuses on the competitive world of cheerleading and over-the-top team rivalries.

The musical premiered at the Alliance Theatre in Atlanta, Georgia in January 2011. The cast included Amanda Lea LaVergne as Campbell, Adrienne Warren as Danielle, Nick Blaemire as Randall, Ryann Redmond as Bridget, and "award-winning competitive cheerleaders from across the country". A national tour of the musical played in major U.S. cities from November 2011 to June 2012.

The touring stage production began previews on Broadway in July 2012 at the St. James Theatre, before opening for a limited engagement on August 1, 2012, to December 30, 2012.

== Summary ==
=== Act One ===
On her last day of junior year, Campbell Davis prays to be named the captain of the Truman High School cheerleading squad ("What I Was Born to Do"). She gets the job, and her first duty is to replace the graduating members. Campbell's boyfriend, Steven calms her down with a song the two of them made to ease her from her new stress as captain ("Happy Kitties"). Her friend Skylar looks forward to tryouts ("Tryouts"). Other members of the squad include Kylar, Skylar's all-time follower, and Steven - Campbell's cute and worshipping boyfriend. Nerdy, chubby outcast Bridget doesn't make the cut, but Campbell takes a risk on adorable sophomore Eva. As the rest of the squad heads off to celebrate, Campbell reflects on the difficulties to come and dreams of "One Perfect Moment".

At summer Cheer Camp, Eva's nervousness threatens the squad's chance to win the coveted Spirit Stick, an honor that indicates an upcoming Nationals win. To boost Eva's confidence, Campbell takes her aside and names her the Sophomore Spirit Leader – which means if Campbell were to lose her position, Eva would be third in the "line of succession" after Skylar and Kylar. After Campbell lifts Eva's spirits, Truman triumphs and celebrates their Spirit Stick win. ("What I Was Born To Do (Reprise)") Two weeks before the end of summer Campbell receives a letter with terrible news: she's been redistricted to inner-city Jackson High School. A horrified Kylar informs her that "they don't even have a squad!" Despite her attempts to stay at Truman, Campbell's fate is sealed. Her dream is gone. Even Steven cannot console his girlfriend. So, Campbell heads to her new school with nervousness and sadness. ("One Perfect Moment (Reprise)")

Campbell arrives ("Welcome to Jackson") and discovers that Bridget has been redistricted as well. Intimidated and amazed, the pair is wowed by an impromptu performance by Jackson's resident dance crew ("Do Your Own Thing"). The day continues, as Campbell feels out of place and intimidated by everyone at Jackson. Campbell and Bridget meet the Queen Bees of Jackson High: Nautica, La Cienega and the head of the crew, Danielle. Bridget is an unexpected hit at Jackson – especially with the hormonal Twig who loves her curves. Campbell offers her talents to the crew, but a verbal slip-up turns the Jackson women against her. Danielle firmly explains that they are dancers and not cheerleaders ("We Ain't No Cheerleaders") – and the group lets Bridget in the crew.

Skylar, Kylar, Eva, and Steven all call Campbell from Truman. Eva talks about how Campbell's old uniform fits perfectly and how she thinks Truman can win Nationals under Skylar's leadership. Steven tries to sing the Happy Kitties song over the phone, but is sent to voicemail.

Later, Bridget consoles a discouraged Campbell and takes her to the Burger Pagoda where Danielle works. Campbell tries to make amends, but Danielle is unmoved and is still furious with Campbell, despite her attempts to explain. As she's leaving the Pagoda, Campbell confronts a pair of entitled rich girls harassing Danielle. Impressed and amused by Campbell's fire, Danielle reconsiders and offers Campbell a one-time chance to dance with the crew, dressed in an old leprechaun mascot suit ("Friday Night, Jackson"). After a shaky start, Campbell kills it as the leprechaun – and catches the eye of Randall, the smooth school D.J. An impressed Danielle gives Campbell an official spot on the Jackson crew.

Later that night, Skylar and Kylar share shocking news, a slip-up in Skylar's grades means she can't be captain, and Kylar has contracted mono. By the rules of succession, Eva is now captain. Campbell grows suspicious ("Something Isn't Right Here") – and a visit to Eva's house seems to confirm her suspicions. Eva has taken on Campbell's appearance, and Campbell discovers Steven 'studying' there as well. Unconvinced by their explanations, Campbell breaks up with Steven and feverishly goes to Skylar and Kylar, who accuse her of paranoia and jealousy. Assessing the situation with Bridget, Campbell learns that Eva's mother is on the school board that decided on the redistricting. Outraged and certain of a conspiracy, Campbell decides to get back at Eva by assembling a squad at Jackson and crushing her at Nationals ("Bring It On").

=== Act Two ===
Campbell approaches a reluctant Danielle about creating a cheerleading squad at Jackson. When Campbell lies and says that a Nationals win includes college scholarships for each winning member and a chance to be on live television, Danielle agrees to join her and assemble a squad. Using some convincing, they assemble of squad of girls and boys all to be on the squad, including Twig and Cameron. ("It's All Happening").

The Jackson Cheerleading Team has their first practice. Before, Campbell has a vision where she is back at Truman suddenly and Eva turns into a demon. Randall snaps her out of it, and they begin. Danielle informs Campbell they have a routine planned, which involves many moves the judges would deduct points for.

Weeks later at the Regional Competition, Truman watches Jackson perform. While Eva, Steven, and Kylar are wowed, Skylar is smugly convinced that Truman will win ("Better"). Though Jackson wins enough points for a Nationals slot, they take second to Truman. Campbell meets up with Eva and Truman after the competition, and she has another vision in which all of the team turn into demons.

Back at school, Twig asks Bridget on a date and Bridget shyly declines. This calls for an intervention from Nautica and La Cienega, who argue that it's no big deal when it comes to her insecurities ("It Ain't No Thing"). Her self-esteem boosted, Bridget chases after Twig. Randall asks Campbell on a picnic date on the cliffs above their town. She happily accepts, but moments later runs into a furious Jackson crew. Danielle has discovered that Campbell lied about the college scholarships as a Nationals prize and breaks up the squad. It's over, and so is their friendship. ("What Was I Thinking?")

Upset and disgusted with herself, Campbell shows up for the date with Randall. After some pointed and playful ribbing, he encourages her to enjoy her high school years and stop worrying so much about her past mistakes ("Enjoy the Trip"). Meanwhile, Skylar, Kylar, and Eva discuss the dissolution of the Jackson cheerleading team, and Eva privately celebrates being made captain and the diabolical means she used to make it happen, revealing to the audience that she had orchestrated the entire change of leadership — blackmailing her mother into transferring Campbell, hacking into the school system to give Skylar a failing grade, and intentionally infecting Kylar with mono — confirming that Campbell was right about her suspicions ("Killer Instinct").

At Jackson, Bridget sports a hickey courtesy of her new boyfriend Twig. Campbell pulls Danielle aside and offers a profuse, pained apology. Danielle is still hurt by the lie, but acknowledges the joy their work brought her. Campbell explains that the experience changed her to the point where she no longer felt any ambition to go to Nationals – their friendship should have always been the most important thing. Despite her conflicting feelings, Danielle confesses that she misses Campbell and her friendship as well and decides to continue working together, meaning Nationals is back on ("We're Not Done").

At Nationals, Truman performs their routine exceptionally ("Legendary"). As the squad recovers, Eva runs into Campbell – Jackson is on deck to perform. Shocked at Campbell's presence, Eva tries — and fails — to undermine her confidence. Eva's efforts escalate as the rest of Jackson looks on, and she eventually reveals her villainous behavior, justifying her actions by claiming that they got Truman first place, which, in her mind, is more important than sportsmanship ("Eva's Rant").

Now on the mat, Jackson offers an exuberant, mind-blowing routine that breaks many of the fundamental rules of cheerleading, but inspires wild applause from the arena ("Cross the Line"). Jackson is sure they won, before being told by Bridget that they had broken many rules and gone outside of bounds multiple times. As the results are read, Campbell holds hands with everyone in Jackson, wondering if this is her moment.

The hopes of winning are quickly shattered as the results say that Truman High School has won Nationals once again. After Eva comes in with the trophy, celebrating in her own insane way, Randall surprises Campbell, offering her his Pinewood Derby trophy from Cub Scouts, which he has repurposed with a Sharpie to credit her with "first place for everything that matters." With Eva gone, the Truman and Jackson squads celebrate their true victory: friendship ("I Got You").

== Principal roles and cast ==
Character	Atlanta	US tour	Broadway	Off West End	UK tour
Character	2011		2012	2018	2021
Campbell Davis	Amanda LaVergne	Taylor Louderman	Taylor Louderman	Robyn McIntyre	Amber Davies
Danielle	Adrienne Warren	Adrienne Warren	Adrienne Warren	Chisara Agor	Vanessa Fisher
Eva	Kelly Felthous	Elle McLemore	Elle McLemore	Sydnie Hocknell	Alicia Belgarde
Randall	Nick Blaemire	Jason Gotay	Jason Gotay	Haroun Al-Jeddal	Connor Carson
Bridget	Ryann Redmond	Ryann Redmond	Ryann Redmond	Kristine Kruse	Chelsea Hall
La Cienega	Gregory Haney	Gregory Haney	Gregory Haney	Matthew Brazier	Jal Joshua
Nautica	Ariana DeBose	Ariana DeBose	Ariana DeBose	Mary Celeste	Georgia Bradshaw
Skylar	Kate Rockwell	Kate Rockwell	Kate Rockwell	Isabella Pappas	Chloe Pole
Kylar	Janet Krupin	Janet Krupin	Janet Krupin	Clair Gleave	Biancha Szynal
Twig	Jon Rua	Nick Womack	Nick Womack	Ashley Daniels	Marvin Charles
Cameron	Dominique Johnson	Dominique Johnson	Dominique Johnson	Clark James	Louis Smith
Steven	Brandon Espinoza	Neil Haskell	Neil Haskell	Samuel Witty	Samuel Wilson-Freeman

Multiple profiles of the cast appeared when the show debuted on Broadway.

== Musical numbers ==
Act I

- "Overture" – Orchestra
- "What I Was Born to Do" – Campbell, Skylar, Kylar, Steven, Bridget and Truman Ensemble
- "Tryouts" – Skylar
- "One Perfect Moment" – Campbell
- "What I Was Born to Do (Reprise)” – Campbell, Eva and Truman Ensemble †
- "One Perfect Moment (Reprise)” – Campbell †
- "Welcome to Jackson" – Orchestra
- "Do Your Own Thing" – Campbell, Bridget, Twig, Randall, Cameron, Danielle, Nautica, La Cienega and Jackson Ensemble
- "We Ain't No Cheerleaders" – Danielle, Nautica and La Cienega
- "Friday Night, Jackson" – Cameron, Twig, Danielle, Randall and Jackson Ensemble
- "Something Isn't Right Here" – Campbell, Eva, Steven, Skylar and Kylar
- "Bring It On" – Campbell and Jackson Ensemble

Act II

- "Entr’acte" – Orchestra †
- "It's All Happening" – Campbell, Danielle, Twig, Cameron, Nautica, La Cienega and Jackson Ensemble
- "Better" – Skylar, Kylar, Eva, Steven, and Truman Ensemble
- "It Ain't No Thing" – Bridget, Nautica, La Cienega
- "What Was I Thinking?" – Campbell and Jackson Ensemble †
- "Enjoy the Trip" – Campbell and Randall
- "Killer Instinct" – Eva and Truman Ensemble
- "We're Not Done" – Danielle and Campbell
- "Legendary" – Truman Ensemble
- "Eva's Rant" – Eva
- "Cross the Line" – Jackson Ensemble
- "I Got You" – Company

Notes
†Not included on the cast recording.

Orchestration

The pit orchestra consists of:

- Two Keyboards (one of these players being the conductor)
- 1st Electric Guitar/Steel String Acoustic Guitar
- 2nd Electric Guitar/Nylon String Acoustic Guitar
- Electric bass
- Drum kit & Drum pads (various): Piccolo Snare, Popcorn Snare, School Bell (SFX), Tambourine, Temple blocks, Triangle
- Percussion: Caxixi, China Cymbal, Concert Bass Drum, Crash Cymbal, Djembe, Drum kit, Drum pads (various): Finger cymbals, Floor tom, Glockenspiel, Gran Casa, Gym whistle, March snare, Mark tree, Piccolo snare, Plastic maraca, Popcorn snare, Shaker, Small shaker, Suspended Cymbal, Tambourine, Timbale and Triangle

== Production history ==
=== Atlanta (2011) ===
The show premiered at the Alliance Theatre, Atlanta, Georgia on January 15, 2011, running until February 20, 2011. The production was directed and choreographed by Andy Blankenbuehler, with set design by David Korins, costume design by Andrea Lauer, lighting design by Jason Lyons and sound design by Brian Ronan. The original cast featured Amanda LaVergne as Campbell, Adrienne Warren as Danielle and Nick Blaemire as Randall, as well as many cheerleaders from across the country who were selected in collaboration with Varsity.

=== US National Tour (2011) ===
After the Atlanta engagement, the musical embarked on a national tour, starting at the Ahmanson Theatre, Los Angeles in November 2011. New cast members for the tour were Taylor Louderman as Campbell, Neil Haskell as Steven, Nick Womack as Twig, Elle McLemore as Eva, and Jason Gotay as Randall.

The cast of the show took part in a celebration to kick off the start of the national tour, featuring performances from the show as well as cheer and dance squads from across the country taking part in a competition.

After travelling to Chicago, San Francisco, Denver, Houston, and Toronto, the tour closed on June 2, 2012.

=== Broadway (2012) ===
The touring stage production premiered on Broadway at the St. James Theatre on July 12, 2012, in previews and officially opened on August 1, 2012, for a limited engagement to October 7, 2012. The tour cast appeared in the Broadway production.

The production extended its run on Broadway until December 30, 2012, closing after 21 previews and 173 performances.

=== Non-Equity Tour (2014) ===
A Non-Equity National/International tour previewed in New Haven, Connecticut at the Shubert Theatre from January 16 to 18, 2014, opened in Macon, Georgia at the Grand Opera House on January 21, 2014, and ended in Tokyo, Japan on July 27, 2014. The tour featured Nadia Vynnytsky and Zuri Washington.

=== UK Tour (2017) ===
The musical was due to make its UK and European première with a UK tour starting at the Palace Theatre in Manchester from 6 September 2017. However, in August 2017 it was announced that the tour has been postponed until 2019

=== Legal battle over production rights ===
The screenwriter of the original movie, Jessica Bendinger, sued in 2011, arguing that she had rights in the licensing of the theater production. She said she would allow the Bring It On musical to proceed if she was properly credited and compensated. In November 2011, an out-of-court settlement was made.

=== London (2018) ===
Bring It On opened at Southwark Playhouse on 2 August to 1 September 2018 produced by the British Youth Theatre Academy. The show was directed and choreographed by Ewan Jones, musically directed by Chris Ma and cast by Anne Vosser. The show starred Robyn McIntyre as Campbell, Chisara Agor as Danielle, Kristine Kruse as Bridget, Isabella Pappas as Skylar, Mary Celeste as Nautica, Matthew Brazier as La Cienega and Clark James as Cameron.

=== UK Tour (2021) ===
In January 2020 a UK Tour of Bring It On: The Musical was announced, with rehearsals from April 2020. The production was postponed to 2021 due to the COVID-19 pandemic. Preview performances began at Peterborough's New Theatre in November 2021. The show then moved to the Queen Elizabeth Hall at London's Southbank Centre between 8 December and 22 January 2022. The show was scheduled to tour 17 cities in UK, but the impact of self-isolation requirements among cast members resulted in 13 London shows cancelled, and made the tour financially unsustainable. The touring shows were cancelled and the cast performed the remaining dates in London. The final production show was 22 January 2022.

=== Canadian Premiere (2025) ===
In May 2025, Bring It On: The Musical had its Canadian regional premiere at the Globe Theatre in Regina, Saskatchewan. The creative team included Jennifer Brewin as director, two-time Sterling Award winner Julio Fuentes as choreographer, and Mateo Chavez Lewis as music director.

== Critical response ==
The musical received positive reviews, with the dance numbers being praised. The New York Times reviewer wrote that the opening number of the Ahmanson Theatre production "truly dazzles" and noted the cast's "impressive gymnastic prowess". The News Observer review praised the cast of the musical and called the production a "high-energy stage spectacle". The Charlotte Observer review noted the show's "witty dialogue, zingily clever songs and inventive visuals" and praised the "high-energy" performances by the cast.

The Huffington Post positively reviewed the show, writing that it had been "a long time since [he] enjoyed a new musical quite as much as Bring It On: The Musical". The review praised the musical's set and "sassy" libretto. Entertainment Weekly gave a more mixed review of the musical, stating that while the performances are energetic, "none are particularly memorable". The reviewer did however note that the "acrobatic cast impressively manage to tumble, dance, and sing at the same time" and gave a "special nod" to Gregory Haney.

In his review of the Broadway production, Charles Isherwood of The New York Times wrote: "The cast of this alternately snarky and sentimental show about rival high school cheer squads often seems to be in constant motion, tumbling and flipping across the stage in elaborate routines that culminate in towering formations of human pyramids.... While it has its moments of memorable wit and some appealing rhythmic Broadway-pop songs, Bring It On is by no means in the same league as those musicals [Next to Normal and In the Heights], and has the feel of a daffy lark embarked upon as a summer-vacation goof."

== Awards and nominations ==
=== Original Atlanta production ===
Year	Award	Category	Nominee	Result
2011	Suzi Bass Award	Best Production		Nominated
2011	Suzi Bass Award	Best World Premiere (Play or Musical)		Won
2011	Suzi Bass Award	Outstanding Director of a Musical	Andy Blankenbuehler	Nominated
2011	Suzi Bass Award	Best Choreography	Andy Blankenbuehler	Won
2011	Suzi Bass Award	Outstanding Featured Actress in a Musical	Ryann Redmond	Nominated
2011	Suzi Bass Award	Outstanding Costume Design for a Musical	Andrea Lauer	Nominated
2011	Suzi Bass Award	Outstanding Lighting Design for a Musical	Jason Lyons	Nominated
2011	Suzi Bass Award	Outstanding Sound Design for a Musical	Brian Ronan	Won

=== Original Broadway production ===
Year	Award	Category	Nominee	Result
2013	Tony Award	Best Musical		Nominated
2013	Tony Award	Best Choreography	Andy Blankenbuehler	Nominated
2013	Drama Desk Award	Outstanding Director of a Musical	Andy Blankenbuehler	Nominated
2013	Drama Desk Award	Outstanding Lyrics	Amanda Green and Lin-Manuel Miranda	Nominated
2013	Drama Desk Award	Outstanding Sound Design	Brian Ronan	Nominated
2013	Drama Desk Award	Outstanding Choreography	Andy Blankenbuehler	Nominated
2013	Drama Desk Award	Outstanding Book of a Musical	Jeff Whitty	Nominated

== In other media ==
On June 19, 2012, the cast performed "It's All Happening" and "It Ain't No Thing" on The Today Show. The company performed "I Got You" in the Macy's Thanksgiving Day Parade on November 22, 2012, and "Cross the Line" on America's Got Talent in August 2012.

Two music videos were released showing the creation of the original Broadway cast recording, "Do Your Own Thing" and "I Got You".

Lin-Manuel Miranda has released two early demos of songs from during the development of the show, "Cross The Line Early Demo, December 2009" and "Don't Drop Demo", which was an intro tune to The National Competition finale that was cut later in development.

A collection of photos from the Broadway cast party were published online.

== Audio recordings ==
On April 24, 2012, Sh-K-Boom Records released a three-song sampler from the national tour of the musical, including the songs "It's All Happening", "It Ain't No Thing" and "Enjoy the Trip". A full cast recording was released digitally on September 25, 2012. A CD was released in stores on October 16, 2012.

== Transgender character ==
Bring It On was the first Broadway musical to feature a transgender high school character, La Cienega, originally played by Gregory Haney. Book writer Jeff Whitty said, "In creating a universe of characters, I always try to find as many differing perspectives as possible, because that's where comedy comes from most often." Jal Joshua was the first transgender actor to play the role of La Cienega within a professional production, as part of the 2021 UK production.

== Cheerleading choreography ==
Due to the many complex cheerleading routines in the show, about half of the cast of the Broadway musical were actual cheerleaders and not musical theater performers. Jessica Colombo, a cheerleading judge and consultant, served as a technical advisor to the musical.

The cheerleading competition company Varsity Spirit was involved in the musical and a Varsity Nationals banner hangs during the national competition scenes at the end of the second act.

In the 2018 London production, cast member and dance captain Matthew Brazier was a trained gymnast and cheerleader. Brazier taught the cast how to perform cheerleading moves such as stunts, jumps and tumbles.
