= Hands on a Hardbody: The Documentary =

- Theatrical release poster
- Directed by: S.R. Bindler
- Produced by: Kevin Morris; S.R. Bindler; Chapin Wilson
- Cinematography: S.R. Bindler; Chapin Wilson; Michael Nickles
- Edited by: S.R. Bindler
- Music by: Neal Kassanoff
- Production company: Providence Entertainment
- Distributed by: Legacy Releasing
- Release date: June 1997
- Running time: 98 minutes
- Country: United States
- Language: English

Hands on a Hardbody: The Documentary is a 1997 film directed by S. R. Bindler documenting an endurance competition that took place in Longview, Texas. The yearly competition pits twenty-four contestants against each other to see who can keep their hand on a pickup truck for the longest amount of time. Whoever endures the longest without leaning on the truck or squatting wins the truck. Five-minute breaks are issued every hour, and fifteen-minute breaks every six hours.

== Plot ==
The documentary follows the 1995 competition which lasted for seventy-seven continuous hours. The film garnered the audience award for best documentary at the 1997 Los Angeles Film Festival. Filmmaker Quentin Tarantino referred to Hands on a Hardbody as one of his go-to movie recommendations.

Large portions of the film's audio were included on the "Something for Nothing" episode of the public radio show This American Life in 1997.

At the time of his death in 2006, film director Robert Altman was developing a feature film based on the documentary.

In 2013, the film was digitally re-mastered and released for sale online.

== Stage musical ==
The documentary was adapted into a musical, Hands on a Hardbody, commissioned by La Jolla Playhouse, La Jolla, California. The book is by Doug Wright, music by Amanda Green and Trey Anastasio, lyrics by Amanda Green, musical staging by Sergio Trujillo and direction by Neil Pepe. After a run at La Jolla in 2012, the musical had a brief engagement on Broadway at the Brooks Atkinson Theater with previews beginning February 23, 2013, opening on March 21, 2013, and closing on April 13, 2013, playing 28 previews and 28 performances. The musical received three Tony Award nominations.

== See also ==
- Touch the Truck
- Nissan Hardbody
