= Regency Girls =

Stage musical comedy

- Music: Curtis Moore
- Lyrics: Amanda Green
- Book: Jennifer Crittenden; Gabrielle Allan
- Productions: Old Globe Theatre, 2025.

Regency Girls is a stage musical comedy with a book by Jennifer Crittenden and Gabrielle Allan and a score by Curtis Moore and Amanda Green.

The musical is set in the English countryside, 1810. It follows Elinor Benton, a young woman who becomes pregnant before marriage, and must now deal with society stereotypes and criticism toward unwed pregnant women. With help of her sister Jane and their friends Petunia and Dabney, they embark on a carriage trip to London that changes their lives forever. The title comes from the Regency time period in British history.

== Synopsis ==
Elinor Benton, a young English woman in 1810, becomes engaged to Stanton. Before Elinor and Stanton can marry, Stanton goes off to sea, and soon after Elinor finds herself pregnant. Initially distraught, she embarks on a road trip to London with her sister Jane and their friends Dabney and Petunia to visit Madame Restell, who runs an abortion clinic.

== Production history ==
The show was initially workshopped at the Bucks County Playhouse as a part of their Oscar Hammerstein Summer Festival in 2022. The original title was Female Troubles. The show was developed with support by the Orchard Project and Aged in Wood productions. In 2023, the creative team was awarded the Edgerton Foundation New Play Award.

The musical had its world premiere at the Old Globe Theatre on April 2, 2025 and ran until May 11, 2025. The show was directed and choreographed by Josh Rhodes.

The show was previewed at The Festival, a musical theatre outdoor festival, in August 2026.

== Original cast and characters ==
Character	Old Globe (2025)
Elinor Benton	Isabelle McCalla
Jane Benton	Kate Rockwell
Dabney	Krystina Alabado
Petunia Percy	Ryann Redmond
Lady Catherine / Madame Restell	Janine LaManna
Stanton	Nik Walker
Galloping Dick / Dingley	Gabe Gibbs
Earl of Lenwich	Benjmain Howes
Scutter	Sav Souza

== Musical numbers ==
Act I

- "A Happy Ending Beginning" – Company
- "Useful" – Elinor, Jane
- "Ruined" – Dabney, Elinor, Jane, Petunia
- "Female Troubles" – Dabney, Ensemble
- "Carriage Trip" - Company
- "Galloping Dick" – Galloping Dick
- "Take A Letter" – Lady Catherine, Scutter, Gretchen, Gertrude
- "Man Things/Patiently Waiting" – Elinor, Petunia, Jane, Dabney, Ensemble
- "What Does That Make Me?" – Elinor, Stanton, Dabney
- "We Got This" – Company

Act II

- "Leave It To The Men" – Earl of Lenwhich, Judge, Priest, Doctor
- "How Long (In 1810)?” - Madame Restell, Elinor, Dabney, Jane, Petunia
- "Jane Finds Her Tingle" - Petunia, Jane, Elinor, Dabney
- "My Apologies" – Stanton
- "Patiently Waiting At The Ball" – Earl of Lenwich, Ensemble
- "Brains and Booty" – Company
- "Flaws" – Jane, Galloping Dick
- "Useful (reprise)" – Elinor, Stanton
- "We Got This (reprise) – Company
- "A Woman Knows" – Elinor, Dabney
- "Let That Someday Be Now" – Elinor
- "We Are Never Going Back There Again" - Company
