= New Line Theatre =

American musical theater company

- Formation: December 6, 1991
- Type: Alternative musical theatre
- Location: St. Louis, Missouri
- Artistic director: Scott Miller
- Website: www.newlinetheatre.com

New Line Theatre is an alternative musical theatre company in St. Louis, Missouri, producing challenging, adult, politically and socially relevant works of musical theatre. The company was created in 1991 and has produced world premieres such as Love Kills, Johnny Appleweed, Woman with Pocketbook, She's Hideous, In the Blood, Attempting the Absurd, and The AmberKlavier; lesser known Broadway and off Broadway shows such as High Fidelity, Passing Strange, bare, The Wild Party, Floyd Collins, A New Brain, March of the Falsettos, Passion, The Robber Bridegroom, The Nervous Set, and Bat Boy; abstract musicals such as Hair, Jacques Brel is Alive and Well and Living in Paris, and Songs for a New World; absurdist musicals such as Reefer Madness, Attempting the Absurd, The Cradle Will Rock, and Anyone Can Whistle; concept musicals such as Company, Assassins, Urinetown, Chicago, Sunday in the Park with George, and Cabaret; and reinterpretations of more mainstream works, such as Evita, Man of La Mancha, Camelot, Pippin, Sweeney Todd, Grease, and Into the Woods.

New Line claims to take philosophical and practical inspiration from theatre models of the 1960s, including Caffé Cino, Café La MaMa ETC, Judson Poets Theatre, Joan Littlewood's People's Theatre Workshop in London, and to a lesser extent from the Living Theatre, the Open Theatre, and various theatre collectives in the US and Europe.

New Line has produced the first productions after Broadway of the musicals High Fidelity, Cry-Baby, and Hands on a Hardbody, to reviews, redeeming them after their brief New York runs and giving them new lives in regional theatre.

New Line Theatre has been honored by the St. Louis Theater Circle with a special award for the company's body of work over the years, and feature stories in American Theatre magazine and The Riverfront Times.

== Past shows ==
=== 1991–1992 ===
- A Tribute to the Rock Musicals *
- Attempting the Absurd *

=== 1992–1993 ===
- Smokin' Santa *
- A Tribute to Stephen Sondheim *

=== 1993–1994 ===
- A Tribute to the Dark Side *
- Breaking Out in Harmony *
- Assassins **

=== 1994–1995 ===
- Pippin
- In the Blood *

=== 1995–1996 ===
- Company
- Out on Broadway *
- Sweeney Todd: The Demon Barber of Fleet Street

=== 1996–1997 ===
- Passion **
- Jacques Brel is Alive and Well and Living in Paris
- The Ballad of Little Mikey **

=== 1997–1998 ===
- Extreme Sondheim *
- March of the Falsettos
- Woman with Pocketbook *
- Assassins

=== 1998–1999 ===
- Songs for a New World **
- Camelot
- Into the Woods

=== 1999–2000 ===
- Floyd Collins **
- Out on Broadway 2000 *
- Hair

=== 2000–2001 ===
- Cabaret
- Anyone Can Whistle
- Hair

=== 2001–2002 ===
- The Cradle Will Rock
- A New Brain **
- Chicago

=== 2002–2003 ===
- The Rocky Horror Show
- Bat Boy: The Musical **
- The Best Little Whorehouse in Texas

=== 2003–2004 ===
- Sunday in the Park with George
- The Nervous Set
- Reefer Madness **
- Hedwig and the Angry Inch

=== 2004–2005 ===
- Man of La Mancha
- She's Hideous *
- The Robber Bridegroom
- Kiss of the Spider Woman

=== 2005–2006 ===
- The Fantasticks
- The AmberKlavier *
- Bat Boy: The Musical
- Jesus Christ Superstar

=== 2006–2007 ===
- Johnny Appleweed *
- Grease
- Urinetown

=== 2007–2008 ===
- Sex, Drugs, and Rock & Roll *
- Assassins
- High Fidelity **

=== 2008–2009 ===
- Hair
- Return to the Forbidden Planet **
- The 25th Annual Putnam County Spelling Bee

=== 2009–2010 ===
- Love Kills *
- The Wild Party **
- Evita

=== 2010–2011 ===
- I Love My Wife **
- Two Gentlemen of Verona
- Bare: A Pop Opera **

=== 2011–2012 ===
- Passing Strange **
- Cry-Baby **
- High Fidelity

=== 2012–2013 ===
- Bloody Bloody Andrew Jackson
- Next to Normal
- Bukowsical **

=== 2013–2014 ===
- Night of the Living Dead: A Musical Thriller **
- Rent
- Hands on a Hardbody **

=== 2014–2015 ===
- Bonnie & Clyde **
- Jerry Springer: The Opera
- The Threepenny Opera

=== 2015–2016 ===
- Heathers: The Musical **
- American Idiot
- Atomic **
- Tell Me on a Sunday **

=== 2016–2017 ===
- Celebration (revised 2016)
- Zorba
- Sweet Smell of Success **
- Out on Broadway: The Third Coming *

=== 2017–2018 ===
- Lizzie **
- Anything Goes
- Yeast Nation

=== 2018–2019 ===
- The Zombies of Penzance*
- La Cage aux Folles
- Be More Chill

=== 2019-2020 ===
- Cry-Baby
- Head Over Heels **
- Urinetown

An asterisk denotes world premiere; a double asterisk denotes regional premiere
