= Janine LaManna =

American actress (born 1966)

- Born: June 14, 1966 (age 60); Rochester, New York, U. S.
- Other name: Janine McDermott
- Education: Wagner College
- Occupations: Actress; singer; voice actress; vocal coach
- Years active: 1988 – present
- Spouse: Mike McDermott (m. 2005)
- Children: 2

Janine LaManna (born June 14, 1966) is an American actress, singer, and vocal coach. She is best known for her extensive career in Broadway musicals, most notably originating the role of Gertrude McFuzz in Seussical, which earned her a Drama Desk Award nomination, and for being the first actress to portray the live-action character of Carmen Sandiego on the PBS children's television series Where in Time Is Carmen Sandiego?.

== Early life and education ==
She was born in Rochester, New York. She attended Wagner College in Staten Island, graduating with a degree in theater. She was later honored by the institution with the Wagner College Fellows Award in recognition of her professional achievements in the performing arts.

== Career ==
=== Theater ===
LaManna began her professional stage career in the early 1990s. From 1994 to 1996, she served as an original standby for Chita Rivera in the Broadway production and subsequent national tour of Kiss of the Spider Woman. She followed this by joining the first national tour of Chicago, performing the role of Velma Kelly.

Throughout the late 1990s and 2000s, LaManna became a steady fixture on Broadway. Her notable credits during this period include playing Evelyn Nesbit in Ragtime (1998–2000), appearing in the ensemble musical Swing! (1999–2001), and portraying Lois Lane/Bianca in the revival of Kiss Me, Kate.

In 2000, LaManna originated the role of Gertrude McFuzz in the Broadway musical Seussical. Her performance received critical praise and earned her a 2001 Drama Desk Award nomination for Outstanding Featured Actress in a Musical. In 2003, she appeared in the short-lived musical revue The Look of Love, celebrating the songs of Burt Bacharach and Hal David. Two years later, she originated the role of Nickie in the 2005 Broadway revival of Sweet Charity alongside Christina Applegate. In April 2007, she stepped into the principal role of Janet Van De Graaff in the Tony Award-winning musical The Drowsy Chaperone, playing the character until July of that year.

In addition to Broadway, LaManna has worked in regional and Off-Broadway theater. Her regional roles include Amneris in Aida at the North Shore Music Theatre, which earned her an Independent Reviewers of New England (IRNE) nomination. In 2023, she starred in the J2 Spotlight Musical Theater Company's Off-Broadway revival of Woman of the Year and debuted a solo cabaret concert titled Black & Gold at The Green Room 42 in New York City. In 2025, she appeared as Lady Catherine and Madame Restell in Regency Girls at The Old Globe.

=== Television and film ===
In 1996, LaManna was cast as the titular character in the PBS geography game show Where in Time Is Carmen Sandiego?, becoming the first live-action actress to portray the character on screen.

Her other television work includes a performance as Paquette in the New York Philharmonic's production of Candide, broadcast on PBS's Great Performances. She also provided the voice for the Sirens in an episode of the animated series Samurai Jack and made a guest appearance in the television drama Devious Maids. On film, she appeared in the 2002 romantic comedy Two Weeks Notice starring Sandra Bullock and Hugh Grant.

LaManna has also performed as a concert soloist. In May 2007, she performed at the White House during a National Military Spouse Appreciation Day event.

== Personal life ==
She married Michael McDermott, a retired U.S. Army Major. The couple has two children, a daughter Mia McDermott and a son Liam McDermott. Because of her husband's military career, LaManna balanced her theatrical pursuits with relocations to various military bases, including residing near Fort Liberty (formerly Fort Bragg) in North Carolina. Outside of acting, she operates a private vocal coaching studio.

== Filmography ==
=== Television ===
Year	Title	Role	Notes
1996	Where in Time Is Carmen Sandiego?	Carmen Sandiego	PBS series
2005	59th Tony Awards	Herself	TV special
2005	Great Performances	Paquette	Episode: Leonard Bernstein's Candide, a Comic Operetta in Two Acts
2015	Devious Maids	Party Goer	Episode: Awakenings
2020	Wait in the Wings	Gertrude McFuzz	Episode: The Fall & Redemption of Seussical

=== Animation ===
List of voice performances in animation
Year	Title	Role(s)	Notes
2003	Samurai Jack	The Siren	Episode: The Scotsman Saves Jack: Part II

=== Web series ===
Year	Title	Role	Notes
2020	Stars in the House	Janine	Episode: Seussical Cast Reunion

=== Film ===
Year	Title	Role	Notes
2002	Two Weeks Notice	Elaine Cominsky	
2004	Flops 101: Lessons from the Biz	Janine	

== Stage ==
=== Theatre ===
Year	Title	Role(s)	Venue(s)	Notes
1993	Evita	Eva Perón	Pittsburgh Musical Theater	
1994	Kiss of the Spider Woman	Spider Woman / Aurora	Broadhurst Theatre	
1997	Chicago	Velma Kelly / June	West End	
1998	Ragtime	Evelyn Nesbit	Broadway	
1999	Swing!	Ms. Callaway & Ms. Benanti	St. James Theatre	
2000	Seussical	Gertrude McFuzz	Boston Tryout	Drama Desk Award nomination
2001	Kiss Me, Kate	Lois Lane / Bianca	Victoria Palace Theatre	
2003	Harmony	Performer	Forrest Theatre	
2003	The Look of Love	Performer	Brooks Atkinson Theatre	
2004	Candide	Paquette	Philharmonic concert	
2004	Aida	Amneris	North Shore Music Theatre	
2005	Sweet Charity	Nickie	Al Hirschfeld Theatre	
2007	The Drowsy Chaperone	Janet Van De Graaff	West End production	
2019	Noises Off	Belinda Blair	The Cape Playhouse	
2022	The Prom	Dee Dee Allen	White Plains Performing Arts Center	
2023	Black & Gold	Performer	The Green Room 42	
2024	In the Spotlight	Seussical	354 West 54th Street	
2025	Regency Girls	Lady Catherine / Madame Restell	The Old Globe	
2026	Oedipus!	Jocasta	54 Below	

== Awards and nominations ==
Year	Award	Category	Result	Title	Ref.
2001	Drama Desk Awards	Drama Desk Award for Outstanding Featured Actress in a Musical	Nominated	Seussical	
2002	44th Annual Grammy Awards	Best Musical Show Album	Nominated	Seussical	
2004	Independent Reviewers of New England (IRNE)	Outstanding Actress in a Musical	Nominated	Aida	
2006	Wagner College	Wagner College Fellows Awards	Honoured	For Professional Achievement	
2019	BroadwayWorld Jackson Awards	Best Lead Actress in a Musical	Won	The Sweet Potato Queens	
2023	BroadwayWorld Regional Awards	Best Performer In A Musical	Nominated	The Prom	
2025	San Diego Theater Critics Circle Awards	Outstanding Featured Performance in a Musical	Nominated	Regency Girls	
2026	Leonidas A. Nickole Award of Distinction	Standout Performance	Honoured	Seussical and Sweet Charity	
