= Nik Walker =

American stage actor (born 1987)

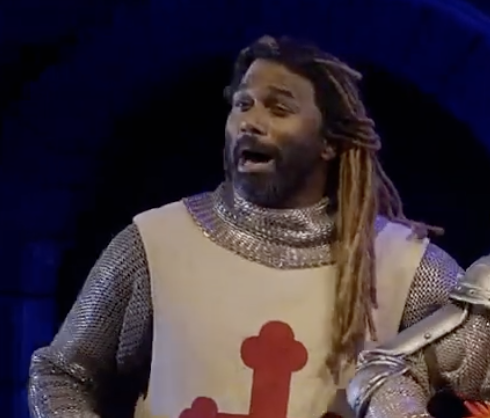
- Walker in Spamalot
- Born: November 29, 1987 (age 38)
- Education: NYU Tisch School of the Arts
- Occupations: Actor, Writer
- Known for: Hamilton, The Phantom of the Opera

Nik Walker (born 29 November 1987) is an American actor and performer. He has co-starred in the Broadway productions of Hamilton, Chicago, and Spamalot playing Aaron Burr, Billy Flynn, and Sir Dennis Galahad, respectively.

== Early life and education ==
Walker was raised in Boston, Massachusetts, and has spoken publicly about how the city's history and culture influenced him as an artist. His mother, Liz Walker, was a popular news anchor for WBZ-TV in Boston before becoming a minister. Having never married, her pregnancy with Nik became headlines and drew criticism from religious leaders who felt she was setting a negative example for youth.

Walker attended NYU Tisch School of the Arts and graduated in 2010.

== Career ==
Walker's early Broadway credits include Hamilton (understudy for several supporting male roles and later as Aaron Burr), Ain't Too Proud, and Motown the Musical.

In 2008, Walker portrayed the Balladeer in the Boston Center for the Arts production of Assassins. The following year he was Benjamin Coffin III in Rent at the Hangar Theatre. He returned to Rent as Tom Collins in 2011 with the Pioneer Theatre Company. Later that year he portrayed John in Miss Saigon at the Ogunquit Playhouse. He starred as the Wolf and Cinderella's Prince opposite Danielle Ferland in the Westport Country Playhouse and Center Stage production of Into the Woods.

Walker made his Broadway debut in 2013 when he joined the cast of Motown: The Musical. He then joined the Broadway cast of Hamilton as an ensemble member and understudy for Aaron Burr, George Washington, and Hercules Mulligan/James Madison. He performed in national touring companies for both Motown the Musical (as Ensemble) and Hamilton (as Burr).

In 2020, he joined the Broadway cast of Ain't Too Proud, taking over the role of Otis Williams. He remained with the production until it closed.

In summer 2021, Walker starred as Sweeney Todd in the Hangar Theatre production of Sweeney Todd: The Demon Barber of Fleet Street.

Walker returned to the Broadway production of Hamilton on March 1, 2022, in the role of Aaron Burr. He starred in the production through February 26, 2023.

Walker performed as Sir Galahad in the Washington, D.C., production of Spamalot at the Kennedy Center in May 2023. He continued in the role when the production moved to Broadway in the fall of that same year.

In the summer of 2024, Walker played Count Carl-Magnus in A Little Night Music at Ogunquit Playhouse. He also appeared in the Apple TV+ movie The Instigators starring Matt Damon.

In addition to his career as a performer, Walker teaches at New York University.

== Personal life ==
Walker is married to Sarah Joyce.

== Theatre credits ==
Year	Production	Role	Category
2008	Assassins	The Balladeer	Regional
2009	Rent	Bejamin Coffin III	Regional
2011	Rent	Tom Collins	Regional
2011	Miss Saigon	John Thomas	Regional
2012	Into the Woods	The Wolf / Cinderella’s Prince	Regional
2013	Motown: The Musical	Ensemble u/s Marvin Gaye	Broadway
2013–2014	Peter and the Starcatcher	Captain Scott	Off-Broadway
2014	Motown: The Musical	Ensemble u/s Marvin Gaye	Broadway
2015–2016	Motown: The Musical	Ensemble u/s Berry Gordy u/s Marvin Gaye	US National Tour
2016	Motown: The Musical	Ensemble u/s Berry Gordy u/s Marvin Gaye	Broadway
2016–2017	Hamilton	Ensemble u/s Aaron Burr u/s George Washington u/s Hercules Mulligan / James Madison	Broadway
2018–2020	Hamilton	Aaron Burr	US National Tour
2020	Ain't Too Proud	Otis Williams	Broadway
2021	Sweeney Todd: The Demon Barber of Fleet Street	Sweeney Todd	Hangar Theatre
2021–2022	Ain't Too Proud	Otis Williams	Broadway
2022–2023	Hamilton	Aaron Burr	Broadway
2023	Spamalot	Sir Dennis Galahad / The Black Knight / Prince Herbert's Father	Kennedy Center
2023–2024	Spamalot	Sir Dennis Galahad / The Black Knight / Prince Herbert's Father	Broadway
2024	A Little Night Music	Count Carl-Magnus Malcolm	Regional
2025	The Phantom of the Opera	The Phantom of the Opera	Off-Broadway
2025	Bull Durham	Crash Davis	Paper Mill Playhouse
2025	Regency Girls	Stanton	Old Globe Theatre
2025–2026	The Phantom of the Opera	The Phantom of the Opera	Off-Broadway
2026	Chicago	Billy Flynn	Broadway
2026	Shrek the Musical	Shrek	The Muny
2026	The Phantom of the Opera	The Phantom of the Opera	Off-Broadway
2026	Begin Again	Saul	Old Globe Theatre
