= The Look of Love (musical) =

2003 musical revue of the songs of Burt Bacharach and Hal David

The Look of Love is a musical revue of the songs of Burt Bacharach and Hal David. The revue was conceived by David Thompson, Scott Ellis, David Loud and Ann Reinking. It had a limited engagement on Broadway in 2003.

== Production ==
The revue was a Roundabout Theatre Company production, scheduled for a limited engagement. It opened on Broadway at the Brooks Atkinson Theatre on April 4, 2003 in previews and officially on May 4, 2003 and closed on June 15, 2003 after 49 performances and 35 previews. The cast was: Liz Callaway, Kevin Ceballo, Jonathan Dokuchitz, Eugene Fleming, Capathia Jenkins, Janine LaManna, Shannon Lewis, Rachelle Rak and Desmond Richardson, with Farah Alvin and Nikki Renee Daniels. The show was directed by Scott Ellis and choreographed by Ann Reinking, scenic design was by Derek McLane, costume design was by Martin Pakledinaz, and orchestrations by Don Sebesky.

An earlier revue featuring the works of Bacharach and David, Back to Bacharach and David, opened in New York in 1992.

== Background ==
David Thompson, in an interview published by the Roundabout Theatre, said that "the challenge was to figure out how to make the songs theatrical...Each lyric's narrative is usually a character singing about a situation...With the Roundabout we had the opportunity to do a couple of workshops, play with the music, and find out what works. We brought in musical director David Loud to give it its musical sensibility and Ann Reinking to give it a style and a sexiness."

== Concept ==
There is no story or unifying theme; songs are staged like skits or dance routines. "I'll Never Fall in Love Again" has a ballet solo; "What's New Pussycat?" has a dance tribute to Bob Fosse, "Do You Know the Way to San Jose?" is done as a variation on a barbershop quartet. "Raindrops Keep Falling on My Head," is a tap number.

== Songs ==
- The Look of Love – Capathia Jenkins and Entire Company
- (There's) Always Something There to Remind Me – Eugene Fleming, Jonathan Dokuchitz and Kevin Ceballo
- You'll Never Get to Heaven (If You Break My Heart) – Janine LaManna
- I Say a Little Prayer – Capathia Jenkins, Janine LaManna and Liz Callaway
- Promise Her Anything – Jonathan Dokuchitz, Rachelle Rak and Shannon Lewis
- I Just Don't Know What to Do With Myself – Liz Callaway
- My Little Red Book / Anyone Who Had a Heart – Kevin Ceballo
- Raindrops Keep Falling on My Head – Desmond Richardson and Eugene Fleming
- Are You There (with Another Girl) – Capathia Jenkins
- Another Night – Janine LaManna
- Yo Nunca Volveré Amar (I'll Never Fall in Love Again) – Kevin Ceballo and Shannon Lewis
- She Likes Basketball – Eugene Fleming
- What's New Pussycat? – Janine LaManna, Rachelle Rak and Shannon Lewis
- Walk On By – Capathia Jenkins
- A House Is Not a Home – Jonathan Dokuchitz
- One Less Bell to Answer – Liz Callaway
- Casino Royale – Farah Alvin, Nikki Renée Daniels and The Orchestra (performed from the orchestra pit)
- Half as Big as Life – Liz Callaway
- Wishin' and Hopin' – Janine LaManna, Rachelle Rak and Shannon Lewis
- Trains and Boats and Planes – Desmond Richardson
- Do You Know the Way to San Jose – Desmond Richardson, Eugene Fleming, Jonathan Dokuchitz and Kevin Ceballo
- Twenty Four Hours from Tulsa – Rachelle Rak
- This Guy's in Love with You / This Girl's in Love – Capathia Jenkins and Eugene Fleming
- Alfie – Liz Callaway
- Close to You – Jonathan Dokuchitz and Janine LaManna
- Wives and Lovers – Desmond Richardson, Kevin Ceballo and Shannon Lewis
- What the World Needs Now Is Love – Janine LaManna, Jonathan Dokuchitz, Kevin Ceballo, Liz Callaway and Rachelle Rak
- Make It Easy on Yourself – Capathia Jenkins
- Check-Out Time – Janine LaManna
- Knowing When to Leave – Liz Callaway
- Promises, Promises – Capathia Jenkins, Janine LaManna and Liz Callaway, Entire Company
- Beginnings – Entire Company

== Critical reaction ==
The production was reviewed by Bruce Weber in The New York Times: "Hearing 29 Bachrach-David songs one after another only makes you realize how limited their range has been, how bland their musical and lyrical palettes are and how little interest they have shown in venturing away from a commercially viable blueprint. With rare exceptions, like 'Walk on By', their substance is all style."

Elysa Gardner in her USA Today review wrote: "...there also are moments when pop savvy and theatrical razzle-dazzle meet harmoniously, and most of them owe at least as much to Reinking's perfect pitch as they do to the vocalists or musicians. The alternately wistful and exuberant dance routines accompanying instrumental versions of 'Wives and Lovers' and 'Raindrops Keep Falling on My Head' are among the show's peaks, while a naughty reinterpretation of 'What's New, Pussycat?' nods stylishly to Reinking's mentor, Bob Fosse."

The Talkin' Broadway reviewer wrote: "A few good moments do prevent The Look of Love from being entirely dreary. The self-mocking choreography in 'I Say a Little Prayer' is amusing and Shannon Lewis's jaw-droppingly sexy and sinewy dancing transcends the rather pedestrian choreography she must frequently cope with. An interesting bar scene combining 'Do You Know the Way to San Jose' and 'Twenty-Four Hours from Tulsa' is central to the second act...one of the show's finest moments is its last, when the entire cast assembles onstage for one of Bacharach and David's most enduring anthems, 'What the World Needs Now'. They're able to lift the spirits and the heart just when they're needed most by standing and singing."
