= High Fidelity (musical) =

2006 musical

- Original Broadway promotional poster
- Music: Tom Kitt
- Lyrics: Amanda Green
- Book: David Lindsay-Abaire
- Basis: High Fidelity by Nick Hornby
- Productions: 2006 Broadway; 2008 St. Louis; 2009 Chicago; 2010 Washington D.C. 2011 Fullerton, CA; 2011 Clinton, IA; 2012 St. Louis, Kansas City; 2015 Canberra, Australia; 2016 Perth, Australia; 2017 Sydney, Australia; 2019 London, UK

High Fidelity is a musical with music by Tom Kitt, lyrics by Amanda Green, and a book by David Lindsay-Abaire.

Based primarily on the 1995 Nick Hornby novel of the same name, the plot focuses on Rob Gordon, a Brooklyn record shop owner in his thirties obsessed with making top five lists for everything, always observing rather than participating in life. When his girlfriend Laura leaves him, he goes through a painful re-evaluation of his life and lost loves (with a little help from his music) and he slowly learns that he has to grow up and let go of his self-centered view of the world before he can find real happiness.

Premiering in Boston in 2006, the musical eventually moved to Broadway, opening on December 7, 2006, at the Imperial Theatre. The show received mixed reviews, and closed on December 17, 2006, after 18 previews and 13 performances.

Upon closing, Broadway Licensing acquired the rights for stock and amateur performance rights.

== Background ==
Kitt recognized the material's potential for musical adaptation when he first read the book, long before the film was released and became a cult hit. He approached Green, with whom he had attended the BMI Lehman Engel Musical Theater Workshop, with the idea, and she too saw the possibilities. Their score runs the gamut from pop music to rhythm and blues to romantic ballads, with each song in the style and musical vocabulary of a different pop or rock artist, including Bruce Springsteen, Beastie Boys, Indigo Girls, Talking Heads, Aretha Franklin, The Who, Guns N' Roses, Billy Joel, George Harrison, Percy Sledge, and others. However, all of the songs in the musical were original compositions, and none of the music by the classic artists spoken about by the characters is actually heard in the show — although (in a fantasy sequence) "Bruce Springsteen" shows up to advise the lead character of Rob on how to be like The Boss.

== Productions ==
The musical had a month long out-of-town tryout at the Colonial Theatre in Boston. It premiered on Broadway on December 7, 2006, at the Imperial Theatre, where it closed on December 17, 2006, after 13 performances and eighteen previews. Directed by Walter Bobbie, the cast included Will Chase, Jenn Colella, Christian Anderson, Kirsten Wyatt, Rachel Stern, Anne Warren, Emily Swallow, J.B. Wing, and Jay Klaitz.

=== Regional and international productions ===
The show was first produced regionally in 2008 by New Line Theatre in St. Louis, MO, with Jeffrey M. Wright (Rob), Kimi Short (Laura), Zachary Allen Farmer (Barry), Aaron Lawson (Dick), Robb Kennedy (Ian), Nikki Glenn (Liz/Jackie), Margeau Steinau (Marie), Mary Crouch (Charlie), Amanda Densmore (Penny), Patrick Donnigan (Futon Guy), Joel Hackbarth (Klepto-Boy), Andrew Hampton (Hipster/Neil Young), Todd Micali (TMPMITW/Bruce Springsteen), Katie Nestor (Anna/Alison), and Lori White (Sarah); directed by Scott Miller, with scenic design by David Carr and Jeffrey Breckel, lighting design by Michael Bergfeld, and costumes by Amy Kelly. New Line Theatre brought the show back in 2012 for another successful run, featuring some of the 2008 cast, Jeffrey M. Wright (Rob), Kimi Short (Laura), Zachary Allen Farmer (Barry), Mike Dowdy (Dick), Aaron Allen (Ian), Talichia Noah (Liz), Margeau Baue Steinau (Marie LaSalle), Terrie Carolan (Anna/Alison), Ryan Foizey (Hipster/Neil Young), Nicholas Kelly (Klepto-Boy), Todd Micali (TMPMITW, Bruce Springsteen), Taylor Pietz (Penny), Sarah Porter (Sarah), Keith Thompson (Futon Guy), and Chrissy Young (Charlie); directed by Scott Miller, with choreography by Robin Michelle Berger, costumes by Amy Kelly, lighting design by Kenneth Zinkl, and scenic design by Scott L. Schoonover.

Productions followed in Chicago, Washington D.C., and other United States' cities.

The Canadian premiere was produced by Hart House Theatre (Toronto) in January 2010, directed by Mark Selby.

The musical was produced at the Roleystone Theatre, Perth, in March 2016, directed by Kristen Twynam-Perkins.

In May, 2018, Minneapolis Musical Theatre created an immersive production of the show inside an actual record store, the Electric Fetus.

== Musical numbers ==
Act I

- The Last Real Record Store – Rob, Pale Young Men, Dick, Barry
- Desert Island Top 5 Break-Ups – Rob, Top 5 Girls
- It's No Problem – Dick
- She Goes – Liz, Rob
- Ian's Here – Ian, Laura
- Number Five with a Bullet – Laura, Top 5 Girls
- Ready to Settle – Marie, Back-Up Singer
- Terrible Things – Marie
- The Last Real Record Store (Reprise) – Barry, Dick, Rob, Pale Young Men
- Nine Percent Chance – Rob, Barry, Dick, Pale Young Men

Act II

- I Slept with Someone – Rob, Laura
- Exit Sign – Neil
- Cryin' in the Rain – Rob, Top 5 Girls
- Conflict Resolution – Rob, Dick, Barry, Pale Young Men, Company
- Goodbye and Good Luck – Bruce, Rob
- It's No Problem (Reprise) – Dick Anna
- Ian's Prayer – Ian
- Laura, Laura – Rob
- Saturday Night Girl – The Skids
- Turn the World Off (And Turn You On) – Barry, Tmpmitw, Klepto Boy, Rob, Laura, Liz, Company

An original cast album was recorded on January 13, 2007, three weeks after the show closed. The album omitted several songs, including "Terrible Things", "Exit Sign", Ian's Prayer", "Saturday Night Girl" and the reprise version of "The Last Real Record Store". Included, however, was "Too Tired", a song cut from the show during rehearsals.

== Critical reception ==
Reviews were mixed, though Amanda Green's lyrics drew particular praise. The Associated Press' Michael Kuchwara wrote that "High Fidelity's charms are considerable and don't be surprised if you fall under its spell", while the review in Entertainment Weekly claimed that "High Fidelity is the unique show that charms both your drinking buddy and your mother." However, Ben Brantley in The New York Times called High Fidelity one of Broadway's "all-time most forgettable musicals."

Clive Barnes of the New York Post was mostly dismissive of the show, but did write that Green's "razzle-dazzle lyrics have a style and grace that zing in the ear."
