= At the Top of the Pyramid =

- Film poster
- Directed by: Lawrence Jordan
- Written by: Richard Willis Jr.
- Story by: Mark A. Peterson; Richard Willis Jr.
- Produced by: Karen T. Bolt
- Starring: Dean Cain; Steve Guttenberg; Elle McLemore
- Cinematography: Philip Alan Waters
- Edited by: Josh Muscatine
- Music by: Chay Alexander Wright; Noriko Olling-Wright
- Production company: Slamgate Productions
- Release date: 2014
- Running time: 88 minutes
- Country: United States
- Language: English

At the Top of the Pyramid is a 2014 American teenage drama film directed by Lawrence Jordan and starring Steve Guttenberg, Dean Cain, and Elle McLemore.

== Premise ==
A young cheerleader attempts to overcome her inner demons after being traumatized by a tragic incident at a cheer leading competition.

== Cast ==
- Elle McLemore as Jamie Parker
- Jessica Luza as Diana Price
- Najla Bashirah as Pam Wilson
- Michael Peterson as CW
- Isaac J. Sullivan as Marcuss Brown
- Miguel Jarquin-Moreland as Miguel Guerro
- Patrick James Lynch as Andrew
- Dean Cain as Jefferson Parker
- Steve Guttenberg as Principal Dickson

== Production ==
The film was shot in Centreville, Virginia, Arlington County, Virginia and Fairfax, Virginia.

== Reception ==
Frank Scheck of The Hollywood Reporter gave the film a negative review, writing that it "doesn't manage to attack the crowd."
