= Hands on a Hardbody (musical) =

2012 musical by Doug Wright

- Music: Trey Anastasio; Amanda Green
- Lyrics: Amanda Green
- Book: Doug Wright
- Basis: Hands on a Hard Body: The Documentary by S.R. Bindler
- Productions: 2012 La Jolla Playhouse; 2013 Broadway; 2014 St. Louis; 2014 Albany, NY; 2014 Chicago

Hands on a Hardbody is a musical based on S.R. Bindler's 1997 documentary film Hands on a Hardbody. The book is by Doug Wright, music by Trey Anastasio and Amanda Green, lyrics by Amanda Green. The documentary was adapted into a musical commissioned by La Jolla Playhouse, La Jolla, California.

== Production history ==
Hands on a Hardbody had a private reading in April 2011 in New York City. The musical had its world premiere at the La Jolla Playhouse, California, running from April 2012 through June 2012. Broadway previews began February 23, 2013 at the Brooks Atkinson Theater, with the official opening on March 21, 2013. Directed by Neil Pepe, the cast featured Allison Case, Keith Carradine, Jon Rua, Hunter Foster, Keala Settle and Mary Gordon Murray. Musical staging is by Sergio Trujillo, scenic design by Christine Jones, costumes by Susan Hilferty and lighting by Kevin Adams. The entire original La Jolla cast performed on Broadway. Sergio Trujillo replaced Benjamin Millepied, who had choreographed the reading and La Jolla production. The musical closed on April 13, 2013, playing 28 previews and 28 performances.

The first regional production was mounted by New Line Theatre in St. Louis, MO in May and June 2014. In June 2014, Theatre Under the Stars in Houston produced the show. Artistic Director Bruce Lumpkin substantially rewrote the show without permission, reassigning songs and lyrics, adding new incidental music, cutting sections of songs, and rearranging the order of the songs, therefore changing the order of when contestants dropped out of the contest. Shortly after opening, licensing agent Samuel French sent TUTS a cease-and-desist letter, and the production was closed prematurely.

== Synopsis ==
Ten contestants vie for a "hardbody" truck in Longview, Texas. The last contestant who has his or her hands on the truck wins it. The truck is a Nissan "hardbody" pickup (on stage). The lives of each contestant, along with the car dealer and a radio announcer are revealed during the "hardbody" contest.

=== Act One ===
The show opens with a pickup truck on stage and Benny Perkins explaining how a 'hands on a hardbody' contest works. The rest of the contestants and contest runners join the stage and all sing about the truck and the contest ("Human Drama Kind of Thing"). The song ends as the contest begins. As the contestants begin to bond they talk about what a truck means to a Texan and why the contestants want the truck and what difference it would make in their life ("If I Had This Truck"). The news crew covering the competition start interviewing the contestants and Janis Curtis and her husband Don catch their attention. Even though he isn't participating in the contest, he is forcing himself to go through everything that his wife has to go through because they're in it together. ("If She Don't Sleep").

It's a ways into the competition now and no one has fallen yet. Benny has been teasing many of the contestants, trying to intimidate them, as he is the only one of them who has won the contest in the past or even participated. He begins belittling Ronald McCowan, who has been snacking on candy bars the whole time. Thusly, he isn't doing so well. He illustrates such with his song "My Problem Right There" while the girls, Kelli, Heather, and Norma are rooting for him because they don't like Benny. The song ends with him taking his hands off and giving up. Benny says that once the first person drops, more people will soon follow.

Benny and the older man in the competition, J.D. Drew have taken to an unlikely partnership. J.D.'s wife, Virginia, keeps visiting and checking up on him, taking care of him during their 15-minute breaks. J.D., however, doesn't like being coddled and pushes her away, saddening her, and she sings about how they used to be when they were young ("Alone With Me"). Then it is revealed that Heather, the Southern beauty in the competition, was chosen by Mike Ferris, one of the people running the competition to win, because she would look good in the advertisements and bring Floyd King Nissan more revenue. He's promised to do what he can to make the competition easier. As he brings lets her sit in the air conditioning they sing ("Burn That Bridge").

Meanwhile, Kelli Mangrum and Greg Wilhote have been bonding. They decide that if either of them wins they will go together to LA ("I'm Gone"). Norma, who's been using her walkman and her faith in God to get her by, begins to crack and breaks into uncontrollable laughter. This bothers Janis immensely and Benny says that it's essentially the beginning of the end. The laughter transitions into a joyful gospel hymn ("Joy of the Lord") that everyone joins in singing, save for Chris Alvaro, the stoic veteran who's been unmoving and unspeaking for the whole competition until he cuts off the song, yelling for everyone to shut up. Everyone's unhappy with Chris's cynical nature and foul language, none more so than Benny, whose son also served. The two exchange nasty words before Chris sings about what it was really like to serve overseas ("Stronger"). By the end he's crying and runs offstage, the second to lose the contest. Benny's lack of respect for Chris and overall nasty attitude infuriates the other contestants. Fueled by their anger, Benny claims that if they can't "Hunt with the Big Dogs" they should stay on the porch with the pups.

=== Act Two ===
Act II begins almost like a commercial with Mike Ferris and Frank Nugent, another host, singing the title song, "Hands on a Hardbody". Cindy Barnes, the female host, approaches Jesus Pena, a Mexican contestant and says to him that if he wins she's going to have to see his green card. She repeats what she can in extremely broken Spanish, though he has told her repeatedly that he speaks English and was born in Texas ("Born in Laredo"). Later, J.D. reflects on his and Virginia's marriage ("Alone With Me (Reprise)").

Janis suddenly pipes up and claims that Heather has taken her hands off the truck to put some lipstick on. Mike does his best to defend Heather but Janis becomes enraged claiming that the competition is fixed ("It's a Fix") and leaves the contest in a blaze of fury, becoming the third contestant eliminated. As J.D. and Benny bond further, they begin talking about where they live and J.D., Benny, and Norma become wistful about how the town has been taken over by industry and has none of the personality that it had when they were young ("Used to Be").

Contestants begin dropping like flies as Jesus, Kelli, and Greg all fall quickly. Jesus hallucinates he's playing with his dog and takes his hands off as if to throw a ball. Kelli is in a daze and walks right off the stage. Greg is hesitant to follow her and give up the competition, but decides it's more important that she doesn't hurt herself and runs after her. Heather is completely jacked up on the uppers she has been taking and begins complaining about how uncomfortable the gloves they have to wear for the contest are. They begin driving her crazy and she confesses that she was set up to win the competition and forfeits ("It's a Fix (Reprise)"). Benny confesses to J.D. that his legs are going numb, which he said at the beginning is when it's all over. J.D. encourages him to hold on, but Benny loses faith quickly and recounts what life has done to him when he hoped and prayed ("God Answered My Prayers") and reveals that his son killed himself while he was overseas. He lets go, saying that God finally answered his prayers with a "yes."

Ronald comes back to see how the competition is going, and to support Norma. Norma loses her faith when her Walkman runs out of juice, so Ronald as well as Chris, who never went back home after losing, begin to sing ("Joy of the Lord (Reprise)") to bring back her spirit, but it works too well, as she takes her hands off to clap along to the music. That leaves J.D. as the last man standing and he wins the competition, giving the truck he won to his wife, Virginia. In the end, all the characters recount what happens for them after the competition and how the competition changed their lives ("Keep Your Hands on It").

== Musical numbers ==
Act 1

- Human Drama Kind of Thing - Benny and Company
- If I Had This Truck - Company
- If She Don't Sleep - Don, Janis
- My Problem Right There - Ronald & Women
- Alone With Me - Virginia, JD
- Burn That Bridge - Heather, Mike, and Company
- I'm Gone - Kelli, Greg
- Joy of the Lord - Norma and Company
- Stronger - Chris and Company
- Hunt with the Big Dogs - Benny and Company

Act 2

- Hands on a Hardbody - Frank, Mike
- Born in Laredo - Jesus and Company
- Alone With Me (Reprise) - JD
- It's a Fix - Janis, Don
- Used to Be - JD, Benny, Norma, and Company
- It's a Fix (Reprise) - Heather
- God Answered My Prayers - Benny and Company
- Joy of the Lord (Reprise) - Ronald, Chris, Norma
- Keep Your Hands on It - JD and Company

== Critical response ==
The New York Times reviewer wrote that the musical "sings sincerely and with a rough-edged humor of the dusty margins of American life.... features a wry, economical book by the Pulitzer Prize-winning playwright Doug Wright..., along with a soulful score by Amanda Green and Trey Anastasio".

The Time reviewer called the musical "engaging", writing:

Trey Anastasio... and lyricist Amanda Green have contributed a flavorful country-Western score that is tuneful, well integrated and evocative of the setting. And choreographer Sergio Trujillo had found inventive ways to keep the stage active, despite the obvious restrictions.

== Awards and nominations ==
On April 30, the musical received three Tony Award nominations for the 67th Tony Awards. The musical received nine 58th Drama Desk Award nominations including Outstanding Musical, and won in the Outstanding Sound Design category. The production received three Outer Critics Circle Award nominations, including Outstanding New Broadway Musical, but did not win any awards.

Keala Settle received a Theatre World Award for Outstanding Broadway or Off-Broadway Debut Performance. The musical received one nomination for the 31st Annual Fred and Adele Astaire Awards but did not win.

=== Original Broadway production ===
Year	Award	Category	Nominee	Result
2013	Outer Critics Circle Award	Outstanding New Broadway Musical		Nominated
2013	Outer Critics Circle Award	Outstanding New Score (Broadway or Off-Broadway)		Nominated
2013	Outer Critics Circle Award	Outstanding Featured Actress in a Musical	Keala Settle	Nominated
2013	Fred and Adele Astaire Awards	Outstanding Choreographer of a Broadway Show	Sergio Trujillo	Nominated
2013	Drama Desk Award	Outstanding Musical		Nominated
2013	Drama Desk Award	Outstanding Featured Actor in a Musical	Keith Carradine	Nominated
2013	Drama Desk Award	Outstanding Featured Actress in a Musical	Keala Settle	Nominated
2013	Drama Desk Award	Outstanding Choreography	Sergio Trujillo	Nominated
2013	Drama Desk Award	Outstanding Music	Trey Anastasio and Amanda Green	Nominated
2013	Drama Desk Award	Outstanding Lyrics	Amanda Green	Nominated
2013	Drama Desk Award	Outstanding Book of a Musical	Doug Wright	Nominated
2013	Drama Desk Award	Outstanding Orchestrations	Trey Anastasio and Don Hart	Nominated
2013	Drama Desk Award	Outstanding Sound Design	Steve Canyon Kennedy	Won
2013	Tony Award (67th)	Best Original Score	Trey Anastasio and Amanda Green	Nominated
2013	Tony Award (67th)	Best Featured Actor in a Musical	Keith Carradine	Nominated
2013	Tony Award (67th)	Best Featured Actress in a Musical	Keala Settle	Nominated
2013	Theatre World Award		Keala Settle	Won
