= Jeff Whitty =

American screenwriter, playwright, performer (born 1971)

Jeffrey Whitty
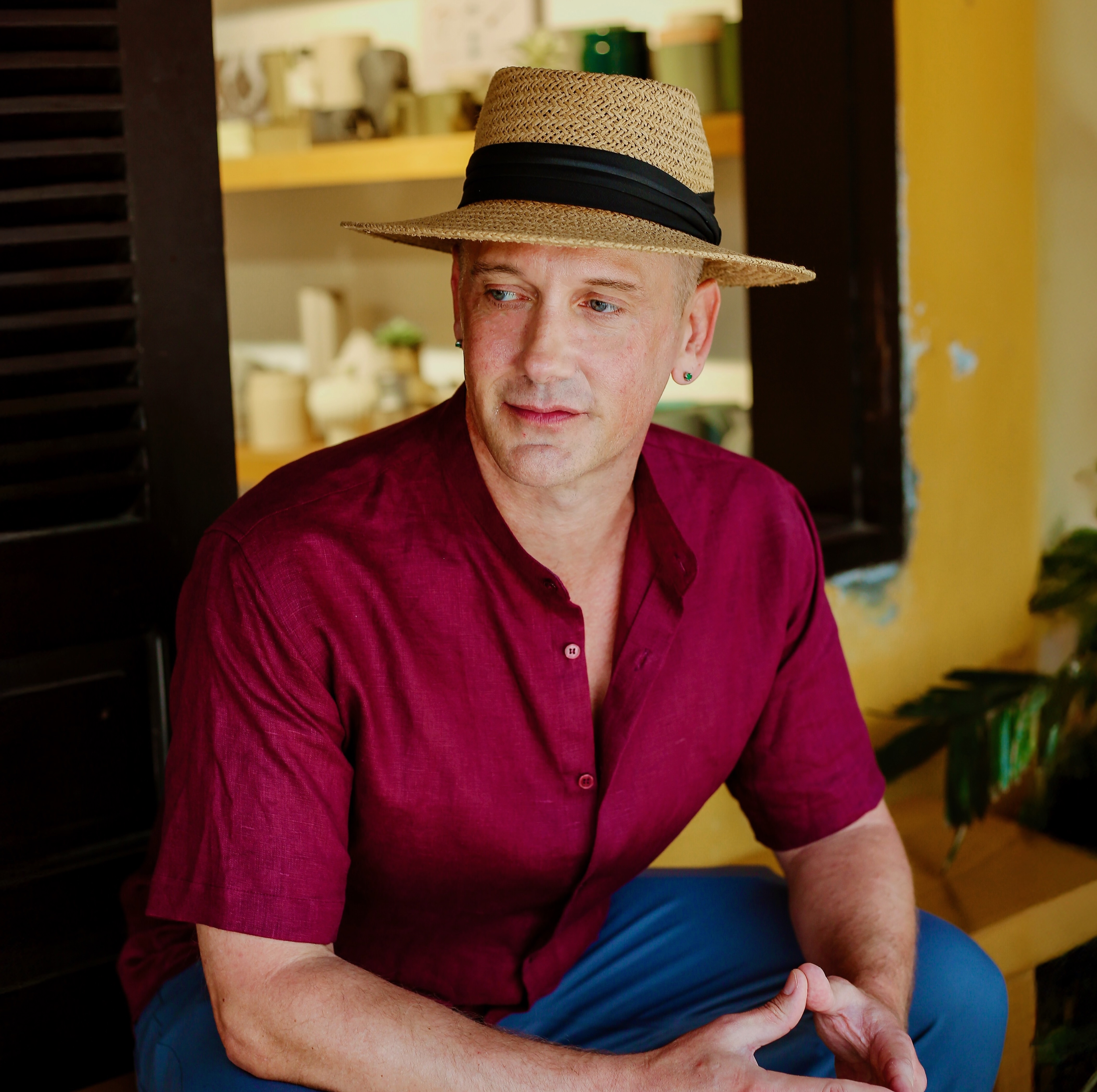
- Born: Jeffrey Daniel Whitty; September 30, 1971 (age 54); Coos Bay, Oregon, United States
- Education: University of Oregon (BA); New York University (MFA)
- Occupations: Screenwriter, playwright, actor
- Writing career
- Notable works: Avenue Q, The Further Adventures of Hedda Gabler, Can You Ever Forgive Me?
- Notable awards: Tony Award for Best Book of a Musical, Writers Guild of America Award for Best Adapted Screenplay, the Los Angeles Film Critics Association Award for Best Screenplay, AARP's Movies for Grownups, the Satellite Awards, and the Film Independent Spirit Awards. Nominations: BAFTA and Academy Award for Best Adapted Screenplay

Jeffrey Daniel Whitty (born September 30, 1971) is an American playwright, actor, and screenwriter.

For the stage musical Avenue Q, he won the Tony Award for Best Book of a Musical.

For his work on the Fox Searchlight film Can You Ever Forgive Me? (2018), he was nominated for the BAFTA and Academy Award for Best Adapted Screenplay and won numerous awards including the Writers Guild of America Award for Best Adapted Screenplay, the Los Angeles Film Critics Association Award for Best Screenplay, AARP's Movies for Grownups, the Satellite Awards, and the Film Independent Spirit Awards.

Avenue Q was his first produced musical and Can You Ever Forgive Me his first produced screenplay.

== Early life and education ==
Whitty was born September 30, 1971, in Coos Bay, Oregon, where he was raised as the fifth of six children. After graduating from the University of Oregon in 1993, he moved to New York City and received a master's degree from New York University's Graduate Acting Program in 1997. After two decades in New York he moved to Los Angeles in 2013.

== Career ==
He won the 2004 Tony Award for Best Book of a musical for Avenue Q, written with composers Robert Lopez and Jeff Marx, which opened at Broadway's John Golden Theatre in 2003 and ran commercially in New York City for sixteen years. Among dozens of international productions and two national tours, the musical ran for six years on London's West End, as produced by Cameron Mackintosh.

Whitty wrote the libretto to the musical adaptation of Armistead Maupin's Tales of the City novels, with music by Jake Shears and John Garden of the musical group Scissor Sisters. The musical was workshopped at the Eugene O'Neill Theater Center's 2009 National Music Theater Conference. It opened in a limited run at American Conservatory Theater in San Francisco on May 18, 2011, and, after extending twice, closed on July 10. It was directed by Jason Moore with a cast that featured Judy Kaye, Betsy Wolfe, Mary Birdsong and Wesley Taylor. Whitty won the 2011 Bay Area Critics Circle award for his work.

Whitty wrote the libretto for Bring It On: The Musical, a "free adaptation" of the popular film series with an original story by Whitty, with music by Tom Kitt and Lin-Manuel Miranda and lyrics by Amanda Green and Miranda. Direction was by Andy Blankenbuehler with music direction by Alex Lacamoire. The musical premiered at the Alliance Theatre, Atlanta, Georgia on January 16, 2011. The musical subsequently went on a multi-city national tour beginning at the Ahmanson Theatre in Los Angeles on October 30, 2011. A revised version opened for a limited run at Broadway's St. James Theatre on August 1, 2012, and was nominated for the 2013 Tony Award for Best Musical.

In 2015, Whitty premiered his original vision of Head Over Heels at the outdoor 1100-seat Allen Elizabethan Theatre at the Oregon Shakespeare Festival. His co-writer and music supervisor was Carmel Dean. Whitty devised the jukebox musical as a hybrid of Sir Philip Sidney's The Countess of Pembroke's Arcadia and the back catalog of 80's pop stars The Go-Go's. After it opened on June 13, Whitty's version of the musical sold out its five-month run within two weeks. New York Times drama critic Charles Isherwood praised Whitty's book as "deliciously witty, bawdy and full of loopy appeal — and written mostly in skillfully wrought iambic pentameter yet."

In 2016, Whitty left the production when director Michael Mayer took over directing duties, installing Tom Kitt as music supervisor and firing all of Whitty's collaborators. A statement from the producers read: “Jeff Whitty’s original book was tied to specific language and arrangements of the Go-Go’s music. Incoming director Michael Mayer had a different vision for ‘Head Over Heels’ and Whitty chose to leave the production. All concerned wish one another success in their future endeavors.” Mayer and Kitt's quite different version of Head Over Heels opened at the Curran Theatre in San Francisco, bound for a Broadway run that opened July 26th, 2018, with a script "substantially revised" by James MacGruder. In March 2023, Whitty published an essay entitled "Grand Theft Musical" alleging severe mistreatment on the part of the producers of Head Over Heels, his agent, and his lawyer, including—variously—exploitation, threats, harassment, and theft of royalties.

In 2018, Fox Searchlight Pictures released Can You Ever Forgive Me, with a screenplay by Whitty and Nicole Holofcener, adapted from a memoir by Lee Israel. The film was directed by Marielle Heller and starred Melissa McCarthy as Israel and Richard E. Grant as Jack Hock, Israel's accomplice. The movie, its creative team and cast won a multitude of awards, with Whitty and Holofcener's screenplay garnering awards from the Writers Guild of America, the Independent Spirit Awards, the Satellite Press Association, the Los Angeles Critic Circle and many more, as well as BAFTA and Oscar nominations for Best Adapted Screenplay.

Whitty's plays include The Further Adventures of Hedda Gabler which was commissioned by and received its world premiere at South Coast Repertory in January, 2006; The Plank Project (a parody of documentary theater pieces like The Laramie Project); the multi-play cycle Balls; The Hiding Place, a romantic Manhattan comedy which received its New York debut at the Atlantic Theater Company; the dark comedy Suicide Weather.

Whitty is an occasional actor, having appeared in New York productions of plays by Amy Freed, including The Beard of Avon and Freedomland, as well as small roles in the films Garmento, Lisa Picard is Famous, and a cameo in Shortbus. Among his theatrical credits include stints at the Goodman Theater in Chicago, Philadelphia Theatre Company, and Playwrights Horizons and New York Theatre Workshop in New York City. In 2012 for a 25-performance run he played the title role in his own The Further Adventures of Hedda Gabler in a production by New York company Exit, Pursued by a Bear, with Billy Porter playing the co-leading role of Mammy. Both roles had been created for and played by women until this production.

== Personal life ==
His older brother George Whitty is a noted jazz musician and producer, and the winner of multiple Grammy and Emmy Awards.

Jeff Whitty now lives on Cape Cod.

== See also ==
- Broadway musical
- LGBT culture in New York City
- List of LGBT people from New York City
