= Andy Blankenbuehler =

Broadway dancer and choreographer

- Born: March 7, 1970 (age 56); Cincinnati, Ohio, U.S.
- Education: Southern Methodist University
- Occupations: Dancer; choreographer; director
- Spouse: Elly Blankenbuehler
- Awards: Tony Award for Best Choreography (2008, 2016, 2017)

Andy Blankenbuehler (born March 7, 1970) is an American dancer, choreographer and director primarily for stage and concerts. He has been nominated for the Tony Award for Best Choreography five times, and has won three times: for In the Heights (2008), Hamilton (2016), and Bandstand (2017). Blankenbuehler's other Broadway choreography work includes 9 to 5, Bring it On: The Musical, and the 2016 Cats revival. Blankenbuehler was awarded the Kennedy Center Honor in 2018 for his work on Hamilton. He also choreographed the movie adaptation of Cats. Most recently he choreographed, directed and co-wrote Only Gold - a new musical with Music by Kate Nash at MCC Theater.

== Life and career ==
Blankenbuehler was born in Cincinnati, Ohio, and is a 1988 graduate of St. Xavier High School and 1984 graduate of Nativity School in Cincinnati. He received his bachelor's degree from Southern Methodist University in Dallas, Texas.

As a performer, he has appeared on Broadway in many musicals, from Guys and Dolls (1992–1995) to Fosse (1999–2001).

His Broadway work as a choreographer includes the musicals In the Heights (2007–08) and 9 to 5 (2008–09). He won the Tony Award and Drama Desk Award for his choreography for In the Heights. Other New York work includes choreography for the "Broadway By The Year:1930, 1938 and 1978" series, and the City Center Encores! productions of The Apple Tree (2006) and The Wiz (2009). He is the director and choreographer of Bring It On: The Musical, written by Jeff Whitty, with music by Lin-Manuel Miranda and Tom Kitt and lyrics by Lin-Manuel Miranda and Amanda Green, which premiered at the Alliance Theatre, Atlanta, Georgia, on January 16, 2011. This production also performed at the Ahmanson Theater in Los Angeles where Blankenbuehler won the 2011 L.A. Drama Critics Circle Award for Best Choreography.

Additionally, Blankenbuehler choreographed the Frank Wildhorn world premiere production of Waiting for the Moon. The show featured 6 full-length dance sequences, including one that lasted over 10 minutes. He was nominated for a Barrymore Award for Choreographing the show.

Blankenbuehler has choreographed for Bette Midler and directed, choreographed, and co-conceived the production "Nights On Broadway" at Caesars Palace.

Blankenbuehler appears briefly in the 2008 documentary Every Little Step about the 2006 Broadway revival of A Chorus Line, with his Polaroid shown as one of the people being cut from a callback for the show.

He choreographed the 2012 Broadway revival of Annie. He is the choreographer for the musical Hamilton (2015), both Off-Broadway and on Broadway. He received a special 2015 Drama Desk Award for Hamilton. The award was described: "For his inspired and heart-stopping choreography in Hamilton, which is indispensable to the musical's storytelling. His body of work is versatile, yet a dynamic and fluid style is consistently evident. When it's time to 'take his shot,' Blankenbuehler hits the bull's-eye." His choreography for Hamilton won the Tony Award for Best Choreography in 2016.

He both directed and choreographed a new musical, Bandstand, which premiered at the Paper Mill Playhouse (New Jersey) in October 2015. The music is by Richard Oberacker and book and lyrics by Robert Taylor and Oberacker. He directed and choreographed a developmental lab of this musical in August and September 2014, then titled Bandstand: A Musical.

In 2016, Blankenbuehler choreographed the revival of the movie Dirty Dancing starring Abigail Breslin and Shane Harper. He also choreographed the revival of the Broadway musical Cats with previews beginning July 14 and an August 2 opening.

Beginning in 2027, Blankenbuehler is set to co-direct and choreograph the new musical Warriors.

== Awards and nominations ==
Year	Award	Category	Nominated work	Result	Ref.
2006	Barrymore Award	Outstanding Choreography/Movement	Waiting for the Moon	Nominated	
2007	Drama Desk Award	Outstanding Choreography	In the Heights	Won	
2008	Tony Award	Best Choreography	In the Heights	Won	
2009	Tony Award	Best Choreography	9 to 5	Nominated	
2009	Drama Desk Award	Outstanding Choreography	9 to 5	Nominated	
2011	Los Angeles Drama Critics Circle Award	Best Choreography	Bring It On	Won	
2013	Tony Award	Best Choreography	Bring It On	Nominated	
2015	Drama Desk Award	Special Award	Hamilton	Won	
2016	Tony Award	Best Choreography	Hamilton	Won	
2017	Tony Award	Best Choreography	Bandstand	Won	
2017	Drama Desk Award	Outstanding Choreography	Bandstand	Won	
2017	Chita Rivera Award	Outstanding Choreography in a Broadway Show	Bandstand	Won	
2017	Outer Critics Circle Award	Outstanding Choreographer	Bandstand	Nominated	
2018	Olivier Award	Best Theatre Choreographer	Hamilton	Won	
2018	Kennedy Center Honors (shared with Lin-Manuel Miranda, Alex Lacamoire and Thomas Kail)		Hamilton	Won	
2023	Chita Rivera Award	Outstanding Choreography in an Off-Broadway Show	Only Gold	Won	
