= Amanda Green =

American actress, singer, and songwriter (born 1963)

- Born: December 29, 1963 (age 62); New York City, U.S.
- Education: Brown University; Circle in the Square Theatre School
- Occupation: lyricist
- Spouse: Jeffrey Kaplan
- Parent(s): Phyllis Newman; Adolph Green

Amanda Green (born December 29, 1963) is an American lyricist, known for her work in musical theatre. She has written the lyrics for four Broadway musicals, High Fidelity, Mr. Saturday Night, Hands on a Hardbody, and Bring It On: The Musical, and has been nominated twice for the Tony Award for Best Original Score.

In 2021, she was elected president of the Dramatists Guild of America, the first woman to hold the role in the Guild's 100-year history.

== Early life and education ==
Born in New York City, Green was raised on the Upper West Side with her brother Adam by their parents Phyllis Newman, an actress and singer, and Adolph Green, a lyricist and playwright.

From an early age, she was exposed to major talents of musical theatre, including Leonard Bernstein, Jule Styne, and Cy Coleman, all of whom were regular guests in her home.

After graduating from Brown University in Rhode Island, Green attended an actors' training program at the Circle in the Square Theatre School in New York City and then spent two seasons at the Williamstown Theatre Festival in Williamstown, Massachusetts. She began writing songs and performing in Manhattan cabarets, like Joe's Pub.

== Career ==
In the mid-1990s, inspired by Lyle Lovett's writing, she moved to Nashville, Tennessee to write country music.

In Los Angeles, Green wrote the lyrics for the musicals Once Upon a Primetime (2002) and Up the Week Without a Paddle (2000), which earned her a nomination from the Los Angeles Drama Critics Circle.

In New York City, a concert of Green's original revue Put a Little Love in Your Mouth!, was performed at Second Stage Theatre in March 2003, and featured Jessica Molaskey, Mario Cantone and Billy Stritch. A recording of a live performance was released on compact disc.

She wrote the lyrics for and co-starred with Nancy Opel in For the Love of Tiffany: A Wifetime Original Musical, which had a sold-out run at The Wings Theater as part of the New York International Fringe Festival in August 2003.

In July 2004, Green and her mother co-hosted a concert titled Bernstein, Comden and Green: A Musical Celebration at the Venetian Theatre at the Caramoor Center for Music and the Arts in Katonah, New York, with performers Sylvia McNair, Judy Kaye, Jason Graae and Hugh Russell.

In 2009, Green appeared in concert at Feinstein's at the Loews Regency, in New York City, with performers Jenn Colella, Ann Harada and Norm Lewis.

Green enrolled in the BMI Lehman Engel Musical Theatre Workshop, where she met Tom Kitt, who suggested the two collaborate on a musical stage adaptation of the comedy-drama film High Fidelity (2000). The show had a one-month run at Boston's Colonial Theatre, then went to New York City. The production opened on December 7, 2006, at the Imperial Theatre in New York City where, hampered by poor reviews, it closed after 14 performances.

The musical Bring It On: The Musical, with music and lyrics by Lin-Manuel Miranda, Tom Kitt and Green and book by Jeff Whitty, premiered at the Alliance Theatre in Atlanta, Georgia on January 16, 2011. Green has written a number of songs with Phish leader Trey Anastasio, one of which ("Burn That Bridge") was performed live by Anastasio in May 2010.

Green and Anastasio wrote the music, with lyrics by Green and the book by Doug Wright, for Hands on a Hardbody, which is a stage musical version of the documentary film Hands on a Hard Body: The Documentary (1997). The musical had its world premiere at the La Jolla Playhouse in San Diego, California in April 2012, and it ran on Broadway in April 2013. Green and Anastasio received a nomination for the Tony Award for Best Original Score.

Green is the recipient of a 2004 Jonathan Larson Award and grant for excellence in songwriting, and is a contributing writer to Playboy magazine.

In 2021, Green became the first woman president of the Dramatists Guild of America.

In 2022, Green wrote the lyrics for the Broadway musical Mr. Saturday Night, starring Billy Crystal. She received a Tony Award nomination for Best Score, with composer Jason Robert Brown. She also was nominated for the 2022 Drama Desk Award for Outstanding Lyrics for the show.

== Personal life ==
Green and her husband, Jeffrey Kaplan, who is an orthopedic surgeon, reside in Manhattan.

== Theatre ==
- Mr. Saturday Night (2022) – Lyricist (Tony Award nomination for Best Original Score)
- Kiss Me, Kate (2019 Revival) – Additional Material
- On the Twentieth Century (2015 Revival) – Additional Lyrics
- Hands on a Hardbody (2013) – Composer and Lyricist (Tony Award nomination for Best Original Score)
- Bring It On: The Musical (2012) – Co-Lyricist
- High Fidelity (2006) – Lyricist
- Regency Girls (2025) – Lyricist
- Peter Pan (2023 National Tour) – Additional Lyrics
- Bob & Carol & Ted & Alice (2020) – Additional Lyrics
- Hallelujah, Baby! (2004 Revival, Arena Stage) – Additional Lyrics
- For the Love of Tiffany: A Wifetime Original Musical (2003, NY International Fringe Festival) – Lyricist and Co-star
- Once Upon a Primetime (2002) – Lyricist
- Up the Weeki Without a Paddle (2000) – Lyricist (Los Angeles Drama Critics Circle Award nomination for Best Score)
- Put A Little Love In Your Mouth! The Songs Of Amanda Green (Off-Broadway Revue, Second Stage Theater & Joe's Pub)
- Crazy Rich Asians (In development) – Co-lyricist

== Filmography ==
=== Film ===
Year	Title	Role	Notes
1991	The Refrigerator	Secretary #2	
2021	Tick, Tick... Boom!	Aspiring Composer and Lyricist	

=== Television ===
Year	Title	Role	Notes
1989	Great Performances	Mrs. Newsome	episode: "Our Town"
2014	Peter Pan Live!	television film; soundtrack	

== See also ==
- List of Brown University people
- List of people from New York City
