= Grease: The New Broadway Cast Recording =

Cast recording by Cast of Grease
- Released: October 2, 2007
- Recorded: August 16, 2007
- Genre: Musical theatre, rock and roll
- Length: 59:50
- Label: Sony Records
- Producer: Kathleen Marshall

Grease: The New Broadway Cast Recording is the cast album for the 2007 Broadway production of the hit musical, Grease. The show, directed by Tony Award-winner Kathleen Marshall, played at the Brooks Atkinson Theatre in New York City. This recording features performances from the cast of Grease including Jenny Powers, Matthew Saldivar, and Grease: You're the One That I Want winners, Laura Osnes and Max Crumm as Sandy Dumbrowski and Danny Zuko, respectively.

== Track listing ==
All tracks are written by Jim Jacobs and Warren Casey, except where noted

Act One
No.	Title	Writer(s)	Performer(s)	Length
1.	"Prologue"		Orchestra	1:07
2.	"Grease"	Barry Gibb	Grigsby	3:18
3.	"Summer Nights"		Max Crumm; Laura Osnes	3:27
4.	"Those Magic Changes"		Ryan Patrick Binder	2:44
5.	"Freddy, My Love"		Robyn Hurder; Lindsay Mendez; Kirsten Wyatt; Jenny Powers	2:46
6.	"Greased Lightnin'"		Matthew Saldívar	3:48
7.	"Rydell Fight Song"		Allison Fischer; Osnes	0:41
8.	"Mooning"		Daniel Everidge; Mendez	2:11
9.	"Look At Me, I'm Sandra Dee"		Powers	1:29
10.	"We Go Together"		Crumm; Hurder	2:35
Total length:				24:06

Act Two
No.	Title	Writer(s)	Performer(s)	Length
1.	"Shaking At the High School Hop"		Cast	2:11
2.	"It's Raining On Prom Night"		Mendez; Osnes	2:18
3.	"Born to Hand-Jive"		Jeb Brown; Cast	3:17
4.	"Hopelessly Devoted to You"	John Farrar	Osnes	2:52
5.	"Beauty School Dropout"		Stephen R. Buntrock	4:43
6.	"Sandy"		Crumm	2:14
7.	"Rock 'n' Roll Party Queen"		Binder; Everidge	1:32
8.	"There Are Worse Things I Could Do"		Powers	2:16
9.	"Look At Me, I'm Sandra Dee (Reprise)"		Osnes	1:49
10.	"You're the One That I Want"	Farrar	Crumm; Osnes	2:26
11.	"We Go Together (Reprise)"		Crumm; Osnes	2:54
12.	"Grease (Karaoke Version)"		Orchestra	3:23
13.	"Greased Lightnin' (Karaoke Version)"		Orchestra	3:49
Total length:				35:44

== Personnel ==
Cast

- Max Crumm – Danny Zuko
- Laura Osnes – Sandy Dumbrowski
- Ryan Patrick Binder – Doody
- Jeb Brown – Vince Fontaine
- Stephen R. Buntrock – Teen Angel
- Daniel Everidge – Roger
- Allison Fischer – Patty Simcox
- Robyn Hurder – Marty
- Lindsay Mendez – Jan
- Jenny Powers – Betty Rizzo
- Jose Restrepo – Sonny
- Matthew Saldívar – Kenickie
- Kirsten Wyatt – Frenchy

Production

- David Lai – production, A&R, audio engineering, audio production
- David Leonard – production, audio production, engineer mixing
- Isaiah Abolin – audio engineering, mixing
- Ian Kagey – audio engineering
- Hyomin Kang – audio engineering
- Seamus Tyson - audio engineering
- Andrew Mendelson – mastering
- Howard Joines – music coordination
- Kimberly Grigsby – music direction
- Randy Cohen – synthesizer programming

Musicians

- Kimberly Grigsby – conducting, synthesizer
- Chris Fenwick – associate conducting, piano, synthesizer
- Jim Hershman – acoustic guitar, electric guitar
- Michael Blanco – acoustic bass, electric bass, double bass
- John Clancy – conga, drums
- John Scarpulla – tenor saxophone, woodwind
- Jack Bashkow – baritone saxophone, woodwind

== See also ==
- Grease (musical)
- Grease (film)
