= Freddy, My Love =

Song

Freddy, My Love is a song written by Jim Jacobs and Warren Casey for the 1971 musical Grease. The song was largely derived from the 1956 hit, "Eddie My Love", by The Teen Queens. Music writer Scott Miller described the song as being "closely based on "Eddie, My Love"", while "also slyly parodying" "I Met Him on a Sunday" by the Shirelles and "Be My Baby" by Ronnie Spector. Miller states:

"Freddy, My Love" is a song about early feminism, about women being sexual and aggressive. But it's also about the materialism of the 1950s, a mindset in which money is better than sex, and gifts are the only true expression of love.

== Recording history ==
The song appeared on the 1972 soundtrack of the musical, and was later recorded by Cindy Bullens for Grease: The Original Soundtrack from the Motion Picture. On the 2007 revival album, Grease: The New Broadway Cast Recording, the song is performed with Robyn Hurder in the lead, backed by Lindsay Mendez, Kirsten Wyatt, and Jenny Powers.

In the musical, the song is performed in the first act, when the character Marty, one of the Pink Ladies, tells about her long-distance courtship with a Marine named Freddy; it is implied that she only maintains this relationship because of the lavish gifts he sends her from Japan. One early review described the tone of the song as "mocking", contrasted with the sentimentality of "Summer Nights" and the contagious excitement of "Born to Hand Jive", while another singled it out as one of the outstanding numbers in the musical, and another identified it as "one of the tuneful rock numbers of the era", and describing the scene introducing the song as "one of the highlights of the first act".

"Freddy My Love" was not included in the 1978 film Grease, although it is listed in the end credits and included on the soundtrack along "Alone at a Drive-in Movie (instrumental)" and "Mooning", which are also songs from the musical not present in the film. Songs in the musical performed by characters other than Danny, Rizzo, Sandy, Johnny Casino, or the Teen Angel were either taken out of the film or given to other characters, including Marty Maraschino's number "Freddy My Love". It was performed by Keke Palmer for the 2016 live television performance, Grease: Live, one of only two songs from the musical to be excluded from the film but included in that performance. It was also included in the Grease: Live soundtrack album.
