= The Last Five Years (film) =

2014 musical film directed by Richard LaGravenese

- Theatrical release poster
- Directed by: Richard LaGravenese
- Screenplay by: Richard LaGravenese
- Based on: The Last Five Years by Jason Robert Brown
- Produced by: Janet Brenner; Kurt Deutsch; Richard LaGravenese; Lauren Versel
- Starring: Anna Kendrick; Jeremy Jordan
- Cinematography: Steven Meizler
- Edited by: Sabine Hoffman
- Music by: Jason Robert Brown
- Production companies: Grand Peaks Entertainment; Lucky Monkey Pictures
- Distributed by: Radius-TWC
- Release dates: September 7, 2014 (TIFF); February 13, 2015 (United States)
- Running time: 94 minutes
- Country: United States
- Language: English
- Budget: $2 million
- Box office: $145,427

The Last Five Years is a 2014 American musical romantic comedy drama film written and directed by Richard LaGravenese. Based on Jason Robert Brown's musical of the same name, the film stars Anna Kendrick and Jeremy Jordan as married couple Cathy Hiatt and Jamie Wellerstein.

It presents their relationship out of chronological order, in a nonlinear narrative. Cathy's songs begin after they have separated and move backwards in time to the beginning of their courtship, while Jamie's songs start when they have first met and proceeds through their crumbling marriage.

The film premiered on September 7, 2014, in the Special Presentations section of the 2014 Toronto International Film Festival. The film was released in select theaters and on video on demand on February 13, 2015.

== Adaptation ==
The musical, as presented on stage, is a two-person show, with no other actors besides the ones playing Jamie and Cathy. It consists almost exclusively of solo numbers; Jamie and Cathy alternate songs, do not share the other's time frame, almost never sing together and frequently are not even present while the other character unburdens themselves. This gives each character space to present their side of the story, biases and all. In adapting for film, LaGravenese made the decision to have the other character present for each monologue, and a few extra pieces of dialogue were added to certain scenes. Apart from this, as well as a few of the lyrics being slightly altered, most of the music is exactly the same, and the order in which the songs are performed is identical to the stage show, with an addition of a drum track added to the original band lineup, which does not appear in the stage lineup. Additionally, a number of other actors appear in other parts, with cameos from both Betsy Wolfe and the composer of the show Jason Robert Brown, though Jordan and Kendrick still provide the bulk of the dialogue and all of the singing.

== Plot ==
The story is told through song and takes place over a five-year period, from the beginning of Jamie and Cathy's relationship in 2009 to their divorce in 2014. It alternates between Cathy's songs and Jamie's songs. Cathy's songs start at the moment she finds out Jamie has left her and move backwards in time until the beginning of their relationship, while Jamie's songs start at the point when they first start dating and proceed forward to when he leaves her. The two timelines converge temporarily at their wedding for the duet "The Next Ten Minutes," and continue past each other for the remainder of the story.

=== "Still Hurting" (Cathy) ===
In 2014, Cathy returns home to find a letter from Jamie declaring their marriage over. She removes her wedding rings, as well as her wristwatch and bracelet.

=== "Shiksa Goddess" (Jamie) ===
In 2009, Jamie is an up-and-coming writer who has just met Cathy. He is overjoyed to be dating outside his Jewish heritage and declares, "I could be in love with someone like you."

=== "See I'm Smiling" (Cathy) ===
During the summer of 2013, Jamie visits Cathy in Ohio, where she is working in summer stock. It is her birthday, and he has come to visit her. She is anxious to fix any problems in their marriage but she becomes angry when Jamie tells her he has to return early to New York in order to attend a Random House party. She accuses him of egotism, claiming he values his career more than his relationship with her.

=== "Moving Too Fast" (Jamie) ===
In 2010, Jamie receives a phone call from a Random House agent, who wants to make a deal for his manuscript. Overjoyed, he calls Cathy and agrees to move in with her. He comments on how lucky he feels to be so successful at only 23. Elsewhere at an audition, Cathy makes a call to her disinterested agent. It seems her career is not going the way she planned as she does not move on to the dance audition.

=== "A Part of That" (Cathy) ===
In late 2010 and early 2011, Cathy attends multiple social functions for the promotion of Jamie's novel and for celebrating its success (63 weeks as a bestseller). She sings about how his newfound fame and success in writing have changed their lives and jokes about how focused or "catatonic" he becomes in his writing process. She expresses that she feels the best way to love Jamie is to focus on him and his growing career. She chooses to "follow in his stride" and put herself and her dreams second to his new success.

=== "The Schmuel Song" (Jamie) ===
After a horrible day working as a bartender during the holiday season, Cathy comes home to an excited Jamie. He tells her a Christmas story he has written about an old tailor named Schmuel, who had given up on his dreams but is able to turn back time and undo his past regrets. After the story, Jamie encourages Cathy to take more risks and continue to pursue her own dreams. For her Christmas present, Jamie gives her an appointment for new headshots, a Backstage magazine, and a wristwatch, as well as the promise to support her as she pursues acting.

=== "A Summer in Ohio" (Cathy) ===
In the summer of 2010, Cathy is in Ohio doing summer stock and videochatting with Jamie. She describes to Jamie her disappointing life in Ohio, her dysfunctional and eccentric colleagues, and her desire to achieve success as an actress in New York, never to return to Ohio. It is revealed they have gotten married.

=== "The Next Ten Minutes" (Jamie and Cathy) ===
Jamie and Cathy's timelines converge as they walk to a gazebo in Central Park, where Jamie proposes. Sometime later, they marry in the same spot.

=== "A Miracle Would Happen/When You Come Home to Me" (Jamie and Cathy) ===
Jamie, now a bestselling author, struggles to resist an increasing number of advances from other women, though he expresses his desire to remain faithful to Cathy. Cathy, meanwhile, has a seemingly successful audition for an off-Broadway show. She calls Jamie to tell him the good news, while he struggles to get a moment away from work to speak with her.

=== "Climbing Uphill" (Cathy) ===
Sometime earlier, Cathy is struggling with poor auditions and repeated rejection. She attends a book reading for Jamie's novel "Light out of Darkness," where she realizes she is not content to put Jamie's career before her own.

=== "If I Didn't Believe in You" (Jamie) ===
Jamie wants Cathy to attend a party to celebrate the publishing of his book, but she refuses, stating she has been to so many of them only to be ignored by her husband. He decides he will go alone, but questions Cathy about why she really refuses to go with him, suggesting she is jealous of his career success. Jamie promises her that he still believes in her and their relationship, but she walks away.

=== "I Can Do Better Than That" (Cathy) ===
Cathy and Jamie are traveling to Cathy's hometown, where he will be meeting her parents for the first time. She expresses her dissatisfaction with suburban life, as well as with her past failed relationships. Upon arriving at her parents' house, she asks Jamie to move in with her.

=== "Nobody Needs to Know" (Jamie) ===
Jamie wakes up in his apartment beside multiple women, including his editor, Alise, and the receptionist at Random House. About to leave for Ohio to visit Cathy, he tries to defend his actions and blames Cathy for destroying his privacy and their relationship. Jamie promises not to lie to Alise and tells her, "I could be in love with someone like you," just as he did to Cathy.

=== "Goodbye Until Tomorrow/I Could Never Rescue You" (Cathy and Jamie) ===
In 2009, Cathy is ecstatic after her first date with Jamie. She proclaims that she has been waiting for Jamie her whole life. Back in 2014, Jamie writes a farewell letter to Cathy, claiming he tried all he could to save their marriage. As a hopeful Cathy waits for a tomorrow with Jamie, a discouraged Jamie tells Cathy "goodbye". He leaves behind his keys and wedding ring. Later that evening, we see Cathy return to the apartment and open the front door to find Jamie's letter waiting for her.

== Cast ==
- Anna Kendrick as Cathy Hiatt
- Jeremy Jordan as Jamie Wellerstein
- Natalie Knepp as Alise Michaels
- Marceline Hugot as Mrs. Linda Whitfield
- Rafael Sardina as Richard
- Allison Macri as Carole Ann
- Alan Simpson as Ryan James
- Nic Novicki as Karl
- Ashley Spencer as Receptionist
- Laura Harrier as Manuscript Woman
- Betsy Wolfe (uncredited) as Cathy's former stripper roommate
- Sherie Rene Scott (uncredited) as a woman in one of Cathy's auditions
- Kurt Deutsch (uncredited)
- Jason Robert Brown (uncredited) as a pianist in one of Cathy's auditions
- Georgia Stitt (uncredited) as a pianist in one of Cathy's auditions

== Production ==
Principal photography began on June 17, 2013 in New York City. The film wrapped on July 16, 2013 in Harlem. It inked foreign distribution deals with countries in Eastern Europe and Asia in August 2014.

Betsy Wolfe, who played Cathy in the 2013 Off-Broadway revival, plays the former stripper that Cathy rooms with in Ohio. Composer Brown plays one of the accompanists during Cathy's auditions in "Climbing Uphill". Sherie Rene Scott, who originated the role of Cathy in the Off-Broadway production, also appears in one of the audition scenes with her husband Kurt Deutsch. Additionally, Jordan's wife Ashley Spencer portrays one of Jamie's affairs in "Nobody Needs to Know".

== Release ==
Radius-TWC announced a release date in the United States of February 13, 2015, simultaneously releasing it in select theatres and on VOD. It was previously set for release in the United Kingdom on December 12, 2014, but was later pushed back to February 6, in line with its US release. Icon Film Distribution then pushed the release date back indefinitely, and they have not yet announced a new date.

=== Box office ===
In its opening weekend in North America, the film grossed $42,042, opening in limited release in three theaters. By the end of its run, the film had grossed $145,427 in the domestic box office.

=== Critical response ===
The review aggregator website Rotten Tomatoes reported a 59% approval rating, based on 101 reviews, with an average rating of 6.1/10. The site's critical consensus states, "The Last Five Years hits a few awkward notes in its transition from stage to screen, but its freshness and sincere charm – and well-matched stars – offer their own rewards." Metacritic, which assigns a weighted average score, calculated an average score of 60 out of 100, based on 28 critics, indicating "mixed or average reviews".

Kendrick's performance was met with widespread critical acclaim, with many citing it as the best performance of her career. In The Observer, Jonathan Romney found the film to be "an enjoyable anomaly. The Last Five Years is not just a romcom for people who hate romcoms, it's also a musical – although people who devoutly hate those may not click with its literate wit and knowing, more-bitter-than-sweet poignancy". Less positively, he wrote: "It's not as cinematically confident as it might be: director Richard LaGravenese isn't always the most imaginative at providing visual settings", before adding, "this does feel like an organic film rather than a show forced into movie glad rags". Romney found the songs to be "unfailingly sharp, though one or two take on clunky rock colourings; even then, they're only as bad as, say, Billy Joel on one of his better days". He concluded, "It's a film to bring tears to the eyes of a cynic – in fact, a cynic might relish it more than anyone, since it's the counterpointing of exuberance with unashamed bleakness that makes The Last Five Years so rich. You may even, just possibly, come out humming the tunes."

In February 2025, The Washington Post ranked the film at number 19 on its list of "The 25 best movie musicals of the 21st century," with Ty Burr writing "A pretty good film adaptation of a pretty good stage musical, but what puts it on this list is Anna Kendrick, a woman who was put on this Earth to sing and is arguably the greatest movie-musical star of her generation."

=== Accolades ===
Year	Award	Category	Recipient	Result
2014	Chicago International Film Festival	Audience Choice Award	Richard LaGravenese	Nominated
2015	Traverse City Film Festival	Founders Prize Special Awards	Richard LaGravenese	Won
2015	Indiana Film Journalists Association Awards	Best Actress	Anna Kendrick	Nominated
