= Kate Rockwell (actress) =

Theatre actress (born 1984)

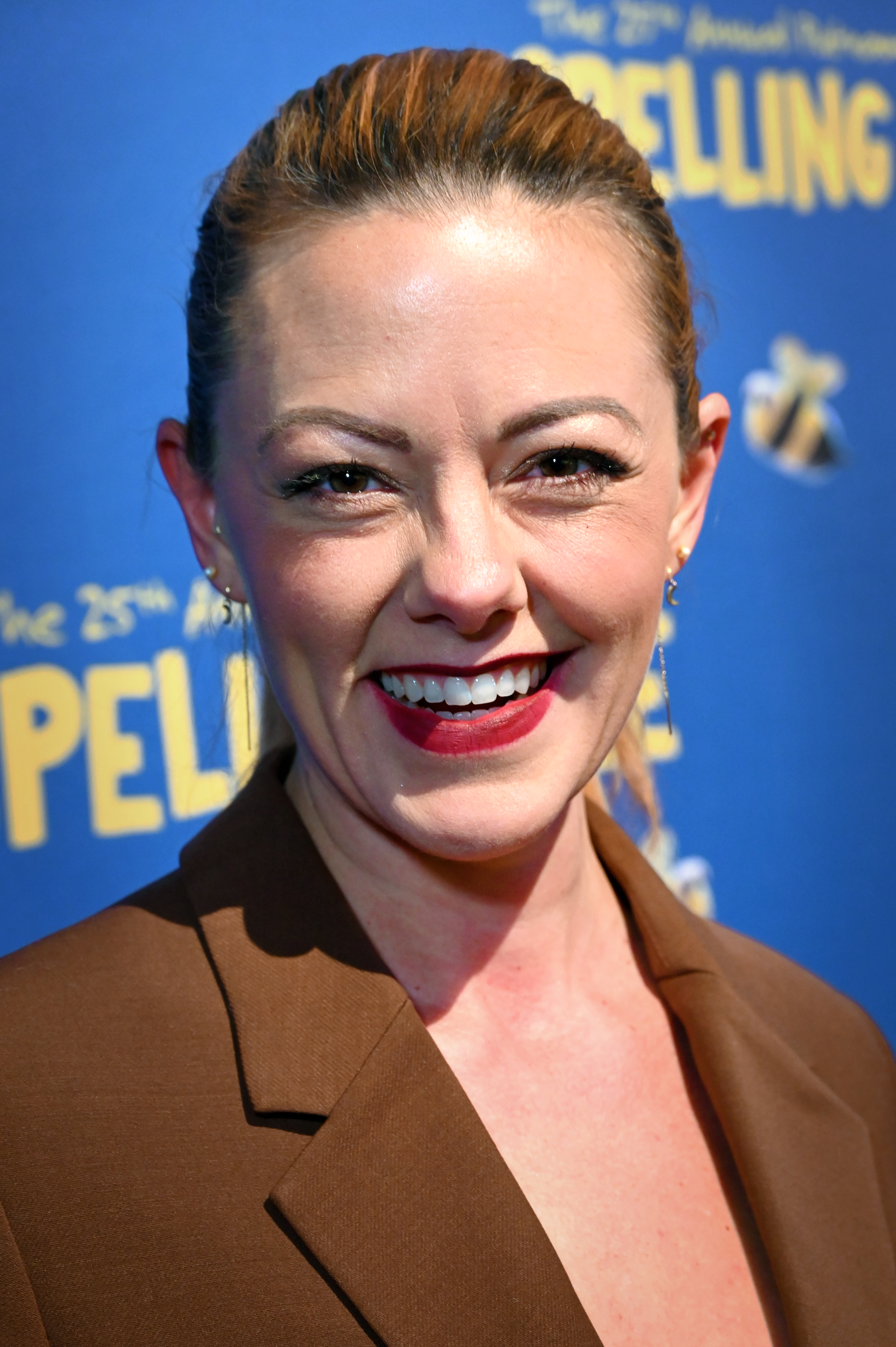
- Rockwell in 2025
- Born: Katherine Rockwell Wilfong; August 4, 1984 (age 42)
- Education: Baldwin Wallace University (BM)
- Occupations: actress; dancer; singer
- Years active: 2002–present
- Spouse: Spencer Howard (m. 2014)
- Children: 1
- Website: https://www.katerockwell.com/

Kate Rockwell (born Katherine Rockwell Wilfong; August 4, 1984) is an American theatre actress, dancer, and singer. She is known for her work on Broadway and for originating the roles of Skylar in Bring It On: The Musical in 2011 and of Karen Smith in the 2018 musical Mean Girls, for the latter of which she received Drama Desk Award and Helen Hayes Award nominations.

== Early life and education ==
Rockwell was born in Connecticut and raised in Cincinnati, Ohio. She is the eldest child born to Charles Wilfong and Linda Warner (née Rockwell). She has two younger siblings, Elizabeth (who goes by "Libet") and William (who goes by "Bear").

She graduated from Sycamore High School in 2002. During her first year, Rockwell was cast as Grandma Tzeitel in her high school's staging of Fiddler on the Roof, her first on-stage theatre experience. She has said in interviews that this production made her realize her desire to pursue musical theatre as a career. In 2002, during her time at Sycamore High School, she helped found the New Stage Collective, a local Cincinnati theater company (later closed in 2009 due to lack of funding). Rockwell then attended Baldwin Wallace University and earned a BM in musical theatre in 2006.

== Career ==
Soon after graduating from college, Rockwell was cast in her first professional production as Philia in A Funny Thing Happened on the Way to the Forum at the Idaho Shakespeare Festival in Boise, Idaho, under the direction of her former Baldwin Wallace professor Victoria Bussert. The production later transferred to the Great Lakes Theater with Rockwell continuing her role as Philia.

In 2007, Rockwell was one of the final 12 contestants on NBC's Grease: You're the One That I Want!, a televised reality competition designed to cast the lead roles of Sandy Dumbrowski and Danny Zuko for the Broadway revival of Grease directed by Kathleen Marshall. She was nicknamed "Serious Sandy" and ultimately eliminated, placing fifth to winner Laura Osnes.

Rockwell made her Broadway debut as Margot in Legally Blonde on May 15, 2008, replacing Haven Burton. She later joined the U.S. national touring production of Legally Blonde for three months as a replacement for the role of Margot (after Rhiannon Hansen broke her leg during a performance). In March 2010 Rockwell joined the cast of the 2009 Broadway production of Hair and remained with the production until its closing on June 27, 2010. Rockwell then continued to play a Member of the Tribe in the U.S. national touring production of the musical.

In January 2011 at the Alliance Theatre, Rockwell starred as Skylar in the world premiere of Bring It On: The Musical, a musical loosely based on the 2000 film of the same name. She remained part of the production through its national tour in 2011 and limited engagement on Broadway from August to December 2012. In January 2013, she returned to Broadway as Sherrie in Rock of Ages, replacing fellow Grease: You're the One That I Want! competitor Ashley Spencer. During the days surrounding her debut as Sherrie, Rockwell filmed a series of video blogs for Broadway.com titled "Oh, Sherrie! Backstage at Rock of Ages with Kate Rockwell." She left the production on April 20, 2014, and was replaced by Carrie St. Louis.

After completing her run in Rock of Ages, Rockwell "left the business" for about two years, stating in interviews, "I needed perspective. I needed some change. I needed to see what it was like to do something else." During this time, she worked at a wine shop on the Lower East Side and earned an advanced certification from the Wine & Spirit Education Trust in 2016. She grew to miss performing and the theater community and began auditioning occasionally.

In the summer of 2014, Rockwell portrayed Jane opposite Nicholas Rodriguez in The Muny's production of Tarzan. She returned to The Muny the following summer, starring as Belle in the company's production of Beauty and the Beast.

In the fall of 2016, Rockwell appeared in the Arena Stage's regional production of Carousel as Carrie Pipperidge. She was later nominated for a Helen Hayes Award in the Outstanding Supporting Actress in a Musical category for this role. After the closing of Carousel, Rockwell decided to pursue musical theatre as her sole career for one year, "to see if it [felt] right." It was during this time that she booked the role of Karen Smith in Mean Girls.

Beginning in 2017, Rockwell starred as Karen Smith in the Tony Award-nominated Broadway musical Mean Girls, written by Tina Fey with music and lyrics by Jeff Richmond and Nell Benjamin, respectively. The show had its world premiere as an out-of-town tryout at the National Theatre in Washington, D.C., from October 31, 2017, to December 3, 2017, in which Rockwell originated the role of Karen Smith. The musical, which is based on the film of the same name, began previews on March 12, 2018, and officially opened on Broadway on April 8, 2018, at the August Wilson Theatre in New York City. For this role Rockwell received a nomination for the Helen Hayes Award in the Outstanding Performer in a Visiting Production category (for her performance in the D.C. production) and a nomination for the Drama Desk Award for Outstanding Featured Actress in a Musical. Rockwell left the production on March 8, 2020, and was replaced by Laura Leigh Turner.

Rockwell released her solo album, "Back to My Roots," in 2018 with Broadway Records.

== Personal life ==
In 2008, Rockwell met actor Spencer Howard when he (as dance captain) was preparing Rockwell for her entry into the Legally Blonde national tour as a replacement for an injured performer. In February 2009, they began a relationship. Rockwell and Howard then married on September 8, 2014, in Marblehead, Massachusetts. The couple now resides in New York City with their two dogs, Mabel and Bessie. Rockwell and Howard welcomed their first child in October 2022.

== Theatre credits ==
| Year | Title | Role | Theatre | Director(s) | Ref. |
|---|---|---|---|---|---|
| 2006 | A Funny Thing Happened on the Way to the Forum | Philia | Idaho Shakespeare Festival | Victoria Bussert | |
| 2006 | A Funny Thing Happened on the Way to the Forum | Philia | Great Lakes Theater | Victoria Bussert | |
| 2007 | Big Tent | Jessica Hahn | New World Stages | Ryan J. Davis | |
| 2007 | High School Musical | Sharpay Evans | North Shore Music Theatre | Barry Ivan | |
| 2007–08 | Phantom | Christine Daaé | Westchester Broadway Theatre | Tom Polum | |
| 2008 | Legally Blonde | Margot (replacement) | Palace Theatre | Jerry Mitchell | |
| 2008 | High School Musical 2 | Sharpay Evans | North Shore Music Theatre | Barry Ivan | |
| 2008–10 | Legally Blonde | Margot (u.s Elle Woods) | U.S. National Tour | Jerry Mitchell | |
| 2009 | Factory Girls | Martha | New World Stages | Victoria Bussert | |
| 2009 | F#@king Up Everything | Juliana | 45th Street Theater | Stephen Brackett | |
| 2010 | Hair | Member of the Tribe/Black Boys Trio (replacement) | Al Hirschfeld Theatre | Diane Paulus | |
| 2010–11 | Hair | Member of the Tribe | U.S. National Tour | Diane Paulus | |
| 2011-12 | Bring It On: The Musical | Skylar | Alliance Theatre | Andy Blankenbuehler | |
| 2011-12 | Bring It On: The Musical | Skylar | U.S. National Tour | Andy Blankenbuehler | |
| 2012 | Bring It On: The Musical | Skylar | St. James Theatre | Andy Blankenbuehler | |
| 2012 | The Circus in Winter | Irene | New World Stages | Victoria Bussert | |
| 2013–14 | Rock of Ages | Sherrie Christian (replacement) | Helen Hayes Theatre | Kristin Hanggi | |
| 2014 | A Confederacy of Dunces | Darlene | Pearl Studios | David Esbjornson | |
| 2014 | Tarzan | Jane | The Muny | John Tartaglia | |
| 2015 | Beauty and the Beast | Belle | The Muny | Matt Lenz | |
| 2016 | Hollywood | Mabel Normand | La Jolla Playhouse | Christopher Ashley | |
| 2016 | Carousel | Carrie Pipperidge | Arena Stage | Molly Smith | |
| 2017 | Mean Girls | Karen Smith | National Theatre (out-of-town tryout) | Casey Nicholaw | |
| 2018–20 | Mean Girls | Karen Smith | August Wilson Theatre | Casey Nicholaw | |
| 2021 | The Sound of Music | Maria Rainer | The Muny | Matt Kunkel | |
| 2022 | The Griswolds' Broadway Vacation | Ellen Griswold | 5th Avenue Theatre | Donna Feore | |
| 2023 | Love All | Marilyn Barnett | La Jolla Playhouse | Marc Bruni | |
| 2025 | Regency Girls | Jane | Old Globe Theatre | Josh Rhodes | |
| 2025 | Heathers: The Musical | Ms. Fleming (temporary replacement) | New World Stages | Andy Fickman | |

== Filmography ==
=== Film ===
| Year | Title | Role | Ref. |
|---|---|---|---|
| 2008 | Sex and the City | Twenty-Something Girl No. 2 | |
| 2014 | Russian Broadway Shut Down | Lesbian | |
| 2021 | Tick, Tick... Boom! | Lauren | |

=== Television ===
| Year | Title | Role | Notes | Ref. |
|---|---|---|---|---|
| 2007 | Grease: You're the One That I Want! | Herself | 3 episodes | |
| 2015 | Deadbeat | Jen | Episode: "The Ghost of Christmas Presents" | |
| 2015 | The Battery's Down | Blonde Girl | Episode: "Reunion" | |
| 2018 | High Maintenance | | Episode: "Globo" | |
| 2018 | Saturday Night Live | Herself (uncredited) | Episode: "Tina Fey" | |
| 2019–20 | Almost Family | Nina Bennett | 3 episodes | |
| 2021 | Harlem | Anna | 5 episodes | |
| 2021 | Blue Bloods | Claire Gilmore | Episode: "The New Normal" | |

== Discography ==
=== Solo recordings ===
- Back to my Roots (2018)

=== Cast recordings ===
- Bring It On: The Musical – Original Broadway Cast Recording (2012)
- Like You Like It – Original Studio Cast RADcording (2016)
- Mean Girls – Original Broadway Cast Recording (2018)
- tick, tick... BOOM! - Soundtrack from the Netflix Film (2021)

=== Collaborative projects ===
- Broadway's Carols for a Cure, Volume 14 (2012)
- Broadway's Carols for a Cure, Volume 20 (2018)

=== As featured artist ===
- "Rockin' Around the Pole" by The Hot Elves (2018)

== Awards and nominations ==
| Year | Award | Category | Nominated work | Result | Ref. |
|---|---|---|---|---|---|
| 2017 | Helen Hayes Award | Outstanding Supporting Actress in a Musical | Carousel | Nominated | |
| 2018 | Helen Hayes Award | Outstanding Performer – Visiting Production | Mean Girls | Nominated | |
| 2018 | Drama Desk Awards | Outstanding Featured Actress in a Musical | Mean Girls | Nominated | |
