= Jenny Powers =

American actress

Jennifer Diane Powers (born August 29, 1979) is an American actress, singer, and beauty pageant contestant. She won the title of Miss Illinois in 2000, and has had major roles in Broadway productions such as Little Women and Grease.

== Early life ==
Powers was raised in Andover, Massachusetts, and attended Northwestern University in Evanston, Illinois, where she earned a bachelor's degree. She was a member of the Upsilon chapter of Delta Delta Delta.

Powers is the granddaughter of David Powers (1912–1998), who served as Special Assistant to President John F. Kennedy and later served as Curator of the John F. Kennedy Library and Museum from 1964 until his retirement in May 1994. David Powers, a close personal friend of Kennedy, rode in the Dallas motorcade when he was assassinated.

Power has a sister, Jacqueline, and a brother, David III. Her father, David Powers, Jr, is an attorney. Her mother, Mary Ellen (Dee) Powers is a Professor of Nursing.

== Beauty pageant ==
In 2000, Jenny Powers was crowned Miss Illinois. She went on to win the talent competition during the Miss America competition. An ardent Democrat, she was asked by Massachusetts Senator John Kerry to sing the national anthem during the 2000 Democratic National Convention.

== Stage career ==
Powers appeared on Broadway as Meg, the eldest March sister, in Little Women, the musical version of the novel Little Women in 2005.

She garnered critical accolades for her performance as Diana Devereaux in May 2006 during an Encores! series production of Of Thee I Sing. In his review in The New York Times, Charles Isherwood wrote Powers "gives a breakthrough performance here as the outraged Southern belle who sashays in and out of the proceedings, quivering with outrage in her slinky red satin."

Powers appeared in the 2007 revival of Stephen Sondheim's "Follies," the story of aging chorus girls confronting their past lives and unwise choices at a reunion. Ben Brantley, The New York Times chief theater critic wrote: ..."you believe in the connections between these characters and their younger selves, who are embodied by a first-rate team of newcomers: Jenny Powers, Colin Donnell, Katie Claus and Curtis Holbrook." He goes on to single out the performances of Donna Murphy and Powers: "To understand what “Follies” is meant to be — and too rarely is — you need only look at Ms. Murphy’s expression when she first sees the actress [Powers] playing her 19-year-old self."

In August 2007, Powers opened in the role of Rizzo in the Broadway revival of "Grease". The casting of the two lead roles in this revival was subject of the reality television show "Grease: You're The One That I Want:" the roles were won in March 2007 by Laura Osnes (Sandy) and Max Crumm (Danny). While panning the show overall, Variety noted: "Jenny Powers' Rizzo seems more hard and bitter than tough and trashy but she plays it with the requisite jaded attitude and delivers the show's best song, the rueful yet unapologetic "There Are Worse Things I Could Do," with conviction." Associated Press theater critic, Michael Kuchwara echoed this sentiment: "Dramatic and vocal honors go to Jenny Powers as Rizzo, the quintessential tough girl who refuses to let the other Pink Ladies see her cry. Rizzo's philosophy is explained in "There Are Worse Things I Could Do," the one song in "Grease" that attempts to define character. Powers makes it work."

She has appeared at The Muny, St. Louis in numerous productions, including: Jerome Robbins’ Broadway (Hildy/Monotony Singer), An Evening with the Stars, Mary Poppins (Mary Poppins), The Addams Family (Morticia Addams), Mamma Mia! (Tanya) in 2016, Oliver! (Nancy), Seven Brides for Seven Brothers (Milly) in 2011 and Camelot (Guenevere). She and Cavanaugh appeared in the concert at the Muni "Muny Magic at The Sheldon" in October 2018.

Powers appeared in the musical Little Dancer at the Kennedy Center in 2014 as Antoinette and will appear in the musical (again as Antoinette Van Goethem) when it runs at the 5th Avenue Theatre, Seattle in March 2019.

== Personal life ==
In August 2009 she married Broadway leading man Matt Cavenaugh. In June 2010, she starred with Cavenaugh in a revival of the musical It's a Bird, It's a Plane, It's Superman at the Dallas Theater Center.

The couple had a baby boy, George Cavenaugh, in July 2012.

== Additional sources ==
- USA Today Review of Grease {dead link}
