= Austin Miller =

American actor, dancer, and singer

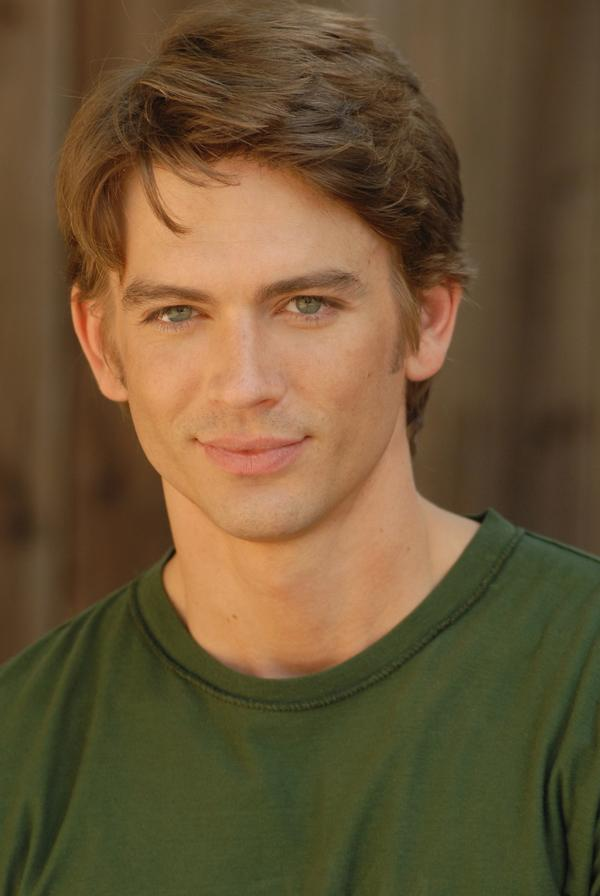
- Born: United States
- Occupations: Actor; dancer; singer
- Website: http://www.thegentlemancaller.net

Austin Miller is an American actor, singer and dancer frequently seen on screen and on stage.

== Biography ==
Miller was raised in the small town of Alvin, Texas (population 21,000), to a conservative Catholic family. Miller started performing at the age of 7, graduating from Alvin High School. He studied dance in Houston and under the tutelage of Patsy Swayze, and then briefly attended Texas's Baylor University on a vocal scholarship, where he joined Delta Tau Delta fraternity. But he dropped out to join a Las Vegas show, "Enter the Night," later performing in Starlight Express. The 19-year-old Miller then went on a national tour with the Grease musical, playing the character of Kenickie (Rizzo's boyfriend, played by Jeff Conaway in the film). He also performed in Smokey Joe's Cafe, playing the character of Michael, and the National Tour of "Victor/Victoria".

After various musical theatre roles, he moved to Los Angeles, obtaining a part as the character, Hawk, on the popular soap opera Days of Our Lives, and also being cast in some small movie roles. He played Link Larkin in the First National touring production of Hairspray. He also took on the same role in the short-lived Las Vegas production of Hairspray, which ran from February to June 2006 at the Luxor Hotel. Miller starred in 2015/2016 as Adam in Trip of Love, the multimillion-dollar spectacle at Stage 42 in New York City. Miller is developing The Gentleman Caller, a lifestyle entertainment brand.

=== Grease ===
Although he had performed in the national tour of Grease, when he auditioned for the same role on Broadway, he was turned down as not "blue collar" enough. At the audition, however, he heard of and applied for the upcoming televised competition, Grease: You're the One that I Want! whose winners were to be cast in the lead roles of Danny and Sandy in the next Broadway production. Thousands of applicants were considered, with a few dozen then chosen to go to a "Grease Academy" bootcamp for one week. Miller proceeded through that step as well, and in 2007 was chosen to be one of the 12 contestants to go on to the live show, where call-in votes by the viewing audience were combined with judges' opinions to eliminate a different contestant each week. On both the February 11 and February 18, 2007, broadcasts one of the judges, influential producer David Ian, chose Miller as the "best Danny of the night." On March 18, 2007, Miller was named as one of the two finalists in the competition, and was told that there was only a 1% difference in voter opinion between him and the other finalist, "Slacker Danny" Max Crumm.

In September 2007, Miller performed in the New York Musical Theatre Festival, in a show called Tully (in no particular order). Since Grease, Miller has starred in the pre-Broadway run of "Trip of Love", and NYMF's Jerusalem Syndrome, as well as the symphony series "Elvis-from Broadway to Memphis". He also played Billy Lawlor in Goodspeed's production of "42nd Street" through July 3, 2009, as well as the National Tour that followed. Several stage appearances have followed, including starring as Joseph in Andrew Lloyd Webber's Joseph and the Amazing Technicolor Dreamcoat in multiple venues, DC's Arena Stage's award-winning production of Sophisticated Ladies with Maurice Hines, and starring as Joe Hardy in Damn Yankees with Andre De Sheilds.

=== Recent shows, writing and producing ===
Branching into more creative areas, Miller most recently had an original screenplay picked up at Rocklin/Faust, a feature production company in Los Angeles that won the Oscar in 2016 for producing Spotlight. Miller is signed at Rocklin / Faust as a writer producer. As far as on stage exploits, in 2013 Miller co-produced the vocal group Del Mundo starring Joel Perez (Sweet Charity) Daniel Torres (Beautiful - The Music Man) and founded, performed and choreographed the male vocal group The Matinee Idols featuring Nicholas Rodriguez, Telly Leung and Brian Justin Crumb.

In 2015 Miller starred in the series Mess and the new USA series Donny!. Mess will be released spring 2017 on HERE! network

In 2015–2016, Miller stars in the multimillion-dollar production Trip of Love at Stage 42 (formerly Little Shubert) in New York City.

In 2018 Miller starred in the feature film Trade, as Michael Lewis, a conflicted lawyer leading a double life. TRADE is available on many streaming platforms and has been streamed over 1 million hours. https://www.imdb.com/title/tt7905148/?ref_=fn_al_tt_2 In 2022 Miller won Best Actor in a Feature for this performance.

Miller is primarily working on a lifestyle concept show called The Gentleman Caller www.austininhouston.com . It features Miller in DIY scenarios, decorating, cooking, building, gardening, and "living his most gracious life". www.TheGentlemanCaller.net Pilot is slated to be produced by Gimme Sugar Productions in 2022 based on an existing YouTube channel.

On November 11, 2020, Double Exposure, a film Miller wrote and co-produced, premiered at Coronado Island Film Festival and will subsequently show at Big Apple Film Festival and many others. The film stars Krysta Rodriguez as a conflicted photo essayist who can't separate life behind her lens and reality while looking for love. The creative team includes choreography by Emmy winner Al Blackstone and music by Hamilton writer and four time Tony and Grammy winner Alex Lacamoire. The film has gone on to win numerous laurels in festivals all over the world as well as acting awards for its stars and cinematography awards for Matt Simpkins - On the Rocks films.

== Performances ==
=== Stage ===
- Smokey Joe's Cafe (Michael)
- Grease (Kenickie)
- Hairspray (Link)
- Tully (In No Particular Order) (Claude Beautee)
- Disney's When You Wish - Theatre Under The Stars, Houston, Texas
- Trip of Love - Japan pre-Broadway run
- The Jerusalem Syndrome (Mickey)
- Go-Go Beach (Woody)
- 42nd Street (Billy)
- Joseph and the Amazing Technicolor Dreamcoat (Joseph, Pharaoh)
- "Sophisticated Ladies" (Lead)
- "Damn Yankees" (Joe Hardy)
- "Idaho!" premier (Whip Masters)
- "Urban Cowboy" (Bud)

=== Television ===
- Days of Our Lives ("Hawk," 2001–2003)
- Grease: You're the One that I Want! ("Hot Danny," 2007)
- Mad TV (numerous episodes, 2001–2003)
- Donny! ("Marcus," USA Network, 2015)

=== Film ===
- Puerto Vallarta Squeeze 2004
- America's Sweethearts 2001
- Dude Where's My Car 2001
- TRADE 2018
- Double Exposure 2020
