= Kurt Deutsch =

American actor (born 1966)

Kurt Deutsch (born Jul 26, 1966, St. Louis, Missouri) is an actor, director, record producer and film producer. He is the president and co-founder, with then-wife Sherie Rene Scott, of Sh-K-Boom Records. In 2017, the company became a division of Warner Music Group's Arts Music, he and Scott divorced, and he became Senior Vice President for Theatrical & Catalog Development for Warner Chappell Music.

== Sh-K-Boom/Ghostlight Records ==
In 2000, Deutsch founded Sh-K-Boom Records, an independent record label that aimed to bridge the gap between pop/rock and theater. In 2004, a new musical theater subsidiary of Sh-K-Boom, Ghostlight Records, was created to focus on more traditional scores and cast recordings. As of 2015, the label has over 150 albums in its catalog, including The Book of Mormon, In the Heights, Beautiful: The Carole King Musical, The 25th Annual Putnam County Spelling Bee and many more Broadway and Off-Broadway shows.

Sh-K-Boom/Ghostlight Records, under Deutsch's leadership, produced and released the debut solo albums of Broadway stars, including Adam Pascal, Sherie Rene Scott, Patti LuPone, Sutton Foster and Kelli O'Hara.

Under the name Sh-K-Boom Entertainment, Deutsch was the driving force for and a producer of the 2014 film adaptation of Jason Robert Brown's The Last Five Years, written and directed by Richard LaGravenese and starring Anna Kendrick and Jeremy Jordan.

As of 2017, Deutsch joined Warner Music Group as a Senior Vice President for Warner/Chappell Publishing, and executive for Warner Arts on the label side.

== Awards and honors ==
As producer, Deutsch received his first Grammy Award for Best Musical Show Album in 2009 for The Original Broadway Cast Album In The Heights along with fellow producers Alex Lacamoire, Andrés Levin, Lin-Manuel Miranda, Joel Moss & Bill Sherman. He has since received two more Grammy Awards for Best Musical Show Album for The Book of Mormon: Original Broadway Cast Recording and Beautiful: The Carole King Musical.

A full list of Grammy Award wins and nominations for Sh-K-Boom/ Ghostlight Records are as follows:

2003

- Great Joy: A Gospel Christmas

2005

- Hair – The Actors’ Fund of America Benefit Recording
- The 25th Annual Putnam County Spelling Bee – Original Broadway Cast Recording
- Dirty Rotten Scoundrels – Original Broadway Cast Recording

2006

- The Drowsy Chaperone – Original Broadway Cast Recording

2008

- (winner) In The Heights – Original Broadway Cast Recording

2009

- Hair – 2009 Broadway Revival Cast Recording

2011

- (winner) The Book of Mormon – Original Broadway Cast Recording
- Anything Goes – 2011 Broadway Cast Recording

2014

- (winner) Beautiful: The Carole King Musical – Original Broadway Cast Recording
- A Gentleman's Guide to Love and Murder – Original Broadway Cast Recording
- Aladdin (musical) – Original Broadway Cast Recording

Sh-K-Boom and Ghostlight were awarded a special 2006 Drama Desk Award for dedication to the preservation of musical theatre through original cast albums.

== Acting ==
As an actor Deutsch appeared on Broadway in Broadway Bound, A Few Good Men and has appeared Off-Broadway and in regional theaters around the country. One of his most notable stage roles was the titular character in Randy Newman's Faust where he performed opposite his wife, Sherie Renee Scott.

He was a series regular on the television series The Human Factor and Winnetka Road, and he guest starred on Sex and the City, Law & Order, Quantum Leap, Matlock, and Models Inc. His film roles included The Eye of the Storm, The First To Go, and Labor Pains. Deutsch also had an uncredited cameo appearance alongside his wife in the film version of The Last Five Years in a casting session scene. (Scott originated the role of Cathy, played in the film by Anna Kendrick, in the original 2001 off-Broadway cast.)
