= Rock of Ages (musical) =

Jukebox musical featuring 1980s rock songs

- Cover art for the cast recording
- Music: Various
- Lyrics: Various
- Book: Chris D'Arienzo
- Productions: 2005 Los Angeles; 2006 Las Vegas; 2008 Off-Broadway; 2009 Broadway; 2010 Toronto; 2010 US Tour; 2011 Australia; 2011 West End; 2012 Manila; 2012 Las Vegas; 2014 UK Tour; 2018 UK Tour; 2018 US 10th Anniversary Tour; 2019 Off-Broadway; 2025 Puerto Rico

Rock of Ages is a jukebox musical built around classic rock songs from the 1980s, especially from the famous glam metal bands of that decade. The musical features songs from Styx, Journey, Bon Jovi, Pat Benatar, Twisted Sister, Steve Perry, Poison and Europe, among other well-known rock bands. It was written by Chris D'Arienzo, directed by Kristin Hanggi and choreographed by Kelly Devine with music supervision, arrangements and orchestrations by Ethan Popp.

During the show, the performers frequently break the "fourth wall", directly addressing the audience and seemingly forgetting (or perhaps reminding the audience) that they are actors in a musical. Despite the musical's title, the Def Leppard song of the same name was not included in the musical during its original Broadway incarnation, though it now often appears in revivals, tours, and regional productions.

The original Broadway production ran for 2,328 performances, closing on January 18, 2015 tied as the 34th-longest running show in Broadway history. Since debuting in 2009, it has spawned replica productions in Japan, Australia and the United Kingdom, as well as several touring productions.

== Synopsis ==
=== Act I ===
Lonny Barnett, who serves as the show's narrator, sets up the story: In 1987, an aspiring rocker named Drew Boley works as a busboy in the Hollywood bar/club called the Bourbon Room, owned by Dennis Dupree and assisted by Lonny ("Just Like Paradise/Nothin' But a Good Time"). He falls instantly for a girl, Sherrie Christian, who just arrived from Paola, Kansas, hoping to make it big in acting ("Sister Christian"). Drew convinces Dennis to hire Sherrie as a waitress.

A pair of German developers, Hertz Klinemann and his son Franz, persuade the city's mayor to abandon the "sex, drugs and rock-n-roll" lifestyle of the Sunset Strip and introduce "clean living" into the area, much to the anger of the City Planner, Regina ("We Built This City"). When Dennis learns that part of the plan involves demolishing The Bourbon Room, he believes the club can generate more money by having rock star Stacee Jaxx and his band Arsenal, who recently announced their break-up, perform their last show at the Bourbon ("Too Much Time on My Hands"). He calls Stacee and convinces him to play the band's last show in the club where he had begun. As Drew struggles to write new lyrics, Sherrie urges him to go after his dreams ("I Wanna Rock"). Regina begins protesting Hertz and Franz's redevelopment plans ("We're Not Gonna Take It").

Later, after arguing with her parents during a phone call, Sherrie begins to discover feelings for Drew, who supports her dream. Also, Drew, auditioning to open for Arsenal, finds the lyrics he has been searching for and realizes that they have come from his feelings for Sherrie ("More Than Words/Heaven/To Be with You"). After obtaining the opening slot for Arsenal, Drew invites Sherrie to have a picnic in the hills overlooking Los Angeles ("Waiting For a Girl Like You"). There, he suggests that the two are merely friends to calm their nerves, disappointing both of them and ruining the date.

Stacee Jaxx arrives at the Bourbon and gives an interview about his life ("Wanted Dead or Alive"). Sherrie is immediately smitten with him, and believing she means nothing to Drew, has sex with Stacee in the men's room ("I Want to Know What Love Is"). While Stacee and Sherrie are copulating, Drew opens for Stacee and Arsenal, not knowing a record producer is in the audience. After their tryst, Stacee tells Dennis to dismiss Sherrie before the concert begins. His guitarist realizes what Stacee did and knocks him out. A record producer, Ja'Keith Gill, in the club was impressed with Drew's performance and suggests he take over for Stacee. He then offers Drew a contract, which he accepts. Sherrie seeks comfort from Drew after she is fired, but having seen her go into the men's room with Stacee, he dismisses her ("Cum on Feel the Noize"). In the midst of these events, Regina continues her protest ("We're Not Gonna Take It [Reprise]").

An upset and unemployed Sherrie meets Justice Charlier, the owner of the nearby Venus Club, which Justice prefers to call a "gentleman's club." She relates to Sherrie's story, saying that many of the small-town girls hoping to hit it big in LA end up making a living as strippers. Grudgingly, Sherrie accepts Justice's offer to work in her club ("Harden My Heart/Shadows of the Night"). As the act closes, everyone is alone – Drew, as a soon-to-be rock star; Sherrie, fending for herself as an exotic dancer; Regina protesting the redevelopment; and Dennis, trying to save his club ("Here I Go Again").

=== Act II ===
Hertz and Franz begin demolition on the Sunset Strip, alienating them from each other as Franz falls for Regina and sees "the error of their ways." Dennis and Lonny join the fight with little success ("The Final Countdown"). Drew's rocker image is upsetting Ja'Keith, and Sherrie is learning how things work at the Venus Club ("Any Way You Want It/I Wanna Rock [Reprise]"). When they meet on the street, Sherrie is embarrassed about her job and Drew is upset that his record company is attempting to reshape him into part of a hip-hop boy band, "Street Boyz," as Joshy J. They argue and Sherrie admits that she was crazy about Drew, but failed to make a move because he said they were friends. They part ways more troubled by these new revelations ("High Enough").

A drunken Stacee arrives at the Venus Club and is pleased to see Sherrie. After being forced to give him a lap-dance, she beats him up while dancing ("I Hate Myself for Loving You/Heat of the Moment"). Drew arrives to admit his feelings to her, but becomes angry when he sees the two in a suggestive position and storms off. Justice later tells Drew that as soon as he left, Sherrie punched Stacee in the jaw.

Regina continues her protest against the destruction of the Strip, but it yields no success. She convinces Franz to stand up to his father if he does not believe in his father's vision. Franz admits that he has his own dream: to open a confectioner's store in Germany. He rebels against his father and admits his love for Regina ("Hit Me with Your Best Shot"). Meanwhile, Dennis and Lonny, upset at the loss of The Bourbon Room, admit that they have feelings for each other ("Can't Fight This Feeling").

Sherrie decides to leave the Venus Club after the scene with Drew, and Justice tells her that she had a similar experience with her first love. Everyone is in turmoil as they attempt to move on with their lives ("Every Rose Has Its Thorn"). Franz leaves for Germany and Hertz begins to regret the hurtful way he treated his son ("Keep on Loving You"). Regina arrives and explains to Hertz that Franz does not hate him; he simply wants his father to support his dream. Hertz decides to return the deed to the Bourbon Room to Dennis and invest in Franz's confectionery store.

Drew, now a pizza delivery boy, realizes none of his dreams have come true—he still is not a rock star, and Sherrie is leaving on a midnight train. Lonny arrives and breaks the fourth wall by explaining to Drew that his life is so miserable because they are all characters in a musical and that it was their book writer who made it so. He also reveals to Drew that he serves as the show's "dramatic conjurer" and that if Drew wants a happy ending, it is up to him to "get the girl." After hearing this, Drew realizes that he does not need fame to make him happy, only Sherrie ("Oh Sherrie"). He reaches her at the train station in time, where they realize that their love has survived all their trials and reconcile ("The Search Is Over").

In the epilogue, The Bourbon Room is spared from demolition and Stacee Jaxx, now a washed-up has-been who has been charged with statutory rape, flees to Uruguay ("Renegade"). Franz opens his confectionery store in Germany and has a long-distance relationship with Regina, who becomes the new mayor of West Hollywood. Dennis passes away, leaving the Bourbon Room to Lonny, and Sherrie and Drew move to Glendale and start a family. Lonny notes that on The Strip, sometimes the dreams with which you enter are not always the dreams with which you leave, but they still rock ("Don't Stop Believin'").

== Productions ==
Original Los Angeles Cast
Role	Actor
Stacee Jaxx	Chris Hardwick
Sherrie Christian	Laura Bell Bundy
Drew Boley	James Snyder
Lonny Barnett	Dan Finnerty
Dennis Dupree	Kyle Gass
Franz Klinemann	Tom Lenk
Regina McKaig	Patty Wortham
Justice Charlier	Michele Mais
Mayor	Jeremy Rabb
Hertz Klinemann	David Holladay

=== Pre-Broadway ===
Los Angeles (2005, 2006)

The musical premiered on July 27, 2005 in Los Angeles at King King, a club on Hollywood Boulevard where it ran for a limited engagement. It later moved to the Vanguard Hollywood in January 2006 for a second short run.

Following the successful run at the Vanguard, the show then moved to Ren-Mar Studios where it played to sold-out crowds. In May 2006 there was a short run at the Flamingo in Las Vegas.

Off-Broadway (2008–2009)

The musical opened Off-Broadway at New World Stages on October 16, 2008 and ran through January 4, 2009. Kelly Devine was the new choreographer, and Ethan Popp was brought in to music supervise, as well as create new arrangements and orchestrations for the production.

=== Broadway ===
(2009–2015)

The musical then transferred to Broadway. Previews began March 17, 2009 at the Brooks Atkinson Theatre, officially opening on April 7, 2009. The Broadway production temporarily closed on January 9, 2011 and moved to the Helen Hayes Theatre, where it resumed performances March 24, 2011.

The show's band had significant stage time compared to other musicals' bands and orchestra members. The band dressed in typical metalhead costumes, fitting with their role as Stacee's back up band, and always on-stage. The drummer played inside a cage with a sign on it that read "Please don't feed the drummer". One of the original guitarists in the stage band, Joel Hoekstra, is a former member of Night Ranger (whose hit "Sister Christian" was performed in the show) and current member of Whitesnake (whose song "Here I Go Again" was also performed in the show). Another guitarist Tommy Kessler is also a member of the band Blondie.

The show closed on January 18, 2015 after 22 previews and 2,328 regular performances, placing Rock of Ages in a tie with Man of La Mancha as Broadway's 32nd-longest running show of all-time.

=== UK productions ===
London's West End (2011–2013)

The UK premiere of the show began previews on August 31, 2011 at the Shaftesbury Theatre in the West End. Opening night took place on September 27, 2011. Amy Pemberton was originally cast as Sherrie but due to illness was forced to withdraw from the show. She performed for the first week of previews and at West End Live 2011. She remained on extended leave while her understudy Natalie Andreou played the role. Pemberton later decided that she would not be returning to the role and Andreou was given it permanently. Andreou performed on opening night.

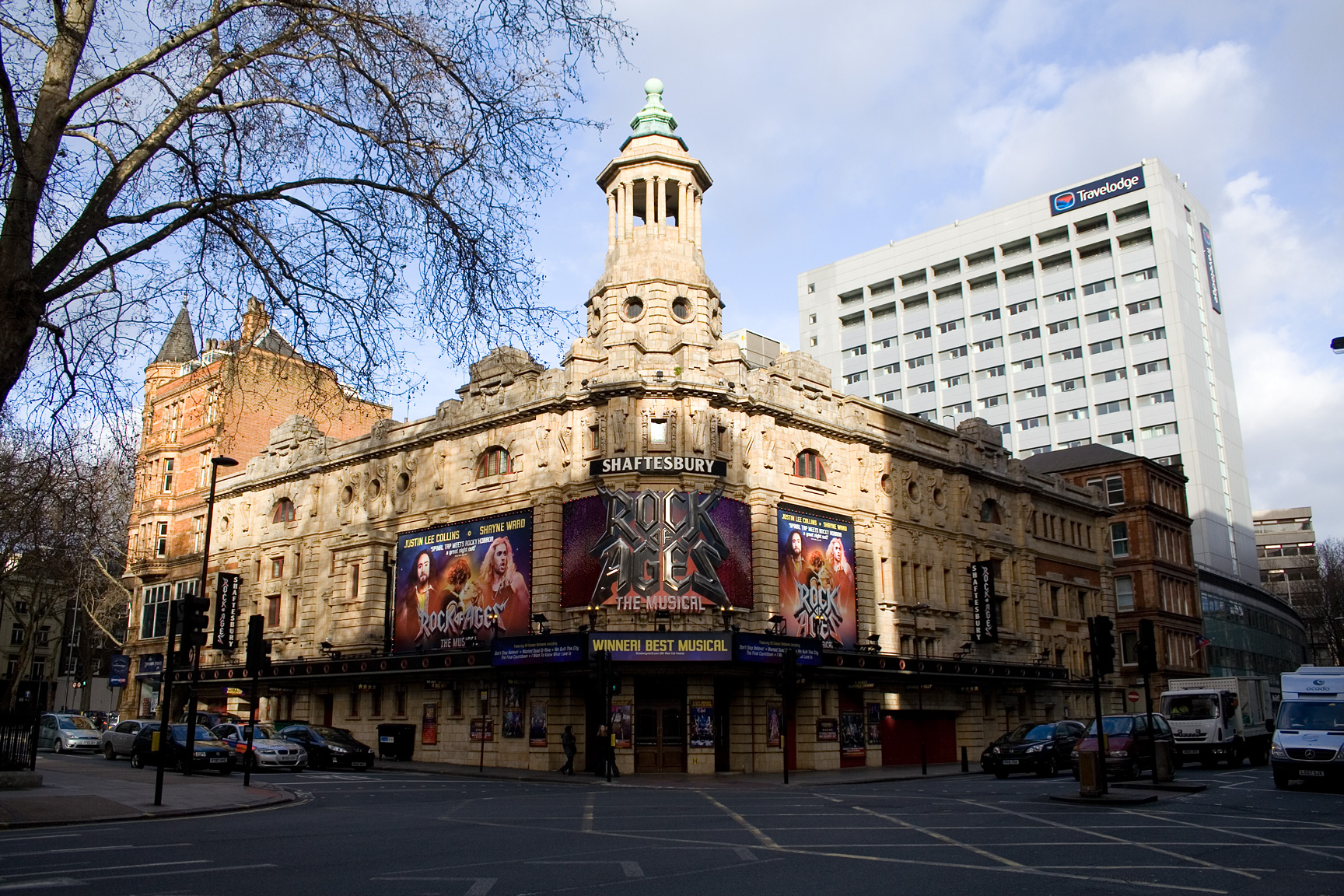
Rock of Ages at the Shaftesbury Theatre, January 2012

The show transferred to the Garrick Theatre in January 2013, where it closed on November 2, 2013 concluding a two-year West End run.

First National UK Tour (2014)

Following its West End closure, the musical began a national tour of the U.K. and Ireland. Performances began at the Palace Theatre, Manchester on May 3, 2014. It was scheduled to visit 27 venues, before concluding at the New Theatre, Wimbledon, London on November 22, 2014.

Second National UK Tour (2018-2021)

A second national tour began on 25 September 2018 in Manchester and was supplied to finish on 27 July 2019, with the final shows in Sunderland. Instead, the tour extended by one week and went to Leeds and the tour concluded there on 3 August 2019. A return tour was slated to start on 6 May 2021 in Portsmouth at the Kings Theatre, Southsea

=== Other notable productions ===
==== Toronto (2010–2011) ====
Previews for the Canadian production began April 20, 2010 at the Royal Alexandra Theater in Toronto, Ontario, with the official opening on May 11, 2010. An open casting call was held to find new talent. The run lasted for eight months, with closing night taking place on January 2, 2011.

==== First North American tour (2010–2011) ====
The first national touring production of North America began performances at the Bank of America Theatre in Chicago, Illinois on September 21, 2010 and ran for ten months, closing at the National Theater in Washington, D.C., on July 24, 2011. The tour visited sixty additional venues.

==== Second North American tour (non-equity) (2011–2014) ====
A second national tour launched on October 4, 2011 in Providence, Rhode Island. It features a Non-AEA cast.

At the second national tour's 2012 stop in Austin, Texas, critic Jeff Davis of BroadwayWorld.com gave the show a glowing review, calling it "the funniest, and often filthiest, jukebox musical" and gave high praise to the entire cast, saying "In addition to a stellar cast of principals, Rock of Ages features one of the hardest-working ensembles I’ve ever seen. They have more energy than a cokehead groupie, and they clearly have fun as they belt out rock standards, making the six-year-old show still feel fresh and new".

After nearly three years touring the United States, Canada, and Puerto Rico, the Second National tour closed at Resorts World Sentosa in Singapore. The two-and-a-half-week sit ran from August 6, 2014 through August 24, 2014.

==== Melbourne & Brisbane, Australia (2011) ====
The musical made its Australian premiere in April 2011 at the Comedy Theatre in Melbourne, with previews from March 2011. The production moved to the Lyric Theatre, QPAC in Brisbane from November 2011, where it closed on December 4, 2011.

==== Manila (2012, 2013, 2014) ====
Rock of Ages made its Asian English-language premiere with Atlantis Productions in Manila, Philippines. In this production, Mig Ayesa reprised the role of Stacee Jaxx, along with Nyoy Volante as Drew and Vina Morales as Sherrie. Also of note was Aiza Seguerra as Regina. The initial production was performed in the Carlos P. Romulo Theater at the RCBC Plaza in Makati from June 15, 2012 to July 8, 2012.

In 2013, Rock of Ages returned to Manila for a repeat run. Most of the original cast returned with the most notable exception being Rachel Alejandro replacing Jinky Llamanzares as Justice. This second run was also performed at the Carlos P. Romulo Theater from July 12, 2013 to July 28, 2013.

==== Las Vegas (2012–2017) ====
At the June 1, 2012, opening of the Bourbon Room on the casino floor at The Venetian, Las Vegas, it was announced that Rock of Ages would be coming to one of the resort's theaters beginning in December 2012. A “surprise” flashmob was deployed at the grand opening as the Venetian's president, John Caparella, announced the musical's new residency. The Venetian features an actual replica of “The Bourbon Room” complete with 1980s video music hosted by VJ Marvellous Mark and professional dancers, known as The Bourbon Babes. Rock of Vegas closed at Venetian on January 3, 2016 and transferred to the Rio Hotel and Casino. The show played its final performance at the Rio on January 1, 2017.

==== Tenth anniversary US national tour and off-Broadway revival (2019) ====
In 2019, It was announced that Rock of Ages would celebrate its tenth anniversary by going on a North American Tour in the U.S. and Canada for the first time since 2011. An off-Broadway revival production premiered on June 19, 2019, at New World Stages. Originally slated for a 16-week run, the show became an open-ended production on November 13, 2019. The anniversary production off-Broadway featured Dot-Marie Jones as the first female Dennis. As of March 12, production was suspended through June 7, 2020, due to the COVID-19 pandemic. This suspension was extended and the show was closed permanently on June 7, 2021.

== Film adaptation ==
The film rights for Rock of Ages were sold to Warner Bros. Pictures and New Line Cinema. The film is directed by Adam Shankman and was originally expected to begin production in the summer of 2010, but started shooting in May 2011, for a June 15, 2012, theatrical release. Tom Cruise plays Stacee Jaxx in the film. Shankman knew Cruise was in when he heard him during a voice lesson, confirming he "has a fantastic voice." Cruise sang five hours a day to prepare for his role. "It's this brilliant mashup, it seems, of Axl Rose, Keith Richards and Jim Morrison." Shankman said of Cruise's performance.

On February 14, 2011, it was announced that Mary J. Blige had signed on to play Justice Charlier in the film. On March 3, 2011, it was confirmed that Julianne Hough would play the role of Sherrie. On March 6, 2011, it was confirmed that Alec Baldwin would play the role of Dennis Dupree. On March 24, 2011, it was announced that Paul Giamatti would be in the film, playing the manager of Stacee Jaxx.

Constantine Maroulis, Broadway's original Drew, makes a cameo appearance in the film. Joel Hoekstra and David Gibbs also make appearances, as do Broadway producers Matt Weaver and Barry Habib.

== Casts of major productions ==
Role	Original Off-Broadway Cast	Original Broadway Cast	First National Tour Cast	Original Australian Cast	Original West End Cast	UK Tour Cast	Original Las Vegas Cast	10th Anniversary US National Tour Cast	10th Anniversary UK Tour Cast	Toronto Cast 2023
Drew Boley	Constantine Maroulis	Constantine Maroulis	Constantine Maroulis	Justin Burford	Oliver Tompsett	Noel Sullivan (Stephen Rolley, alternate)	Justin Mortelliti	Anthony Nuccio	Luke Walsh	Trevor Coll
Sherrie Christian	Kelli Barrett	Amy Spanger	Rebecca Faulkenberry	Amy Lehpamer	Amy Pemberton	Cordelia Farnworth	Carrie St. Louis	Katie LaMark	Danielle Hope / Jodie Steele	AJ Bridel
Lonny/Record Executive	Mitchell Jarvis	Mitchell Jarvis	Patrick Lewallen	Brent Hill	Simon Lipkin	Stephen Rahman-Hughes	Mark Shunock	John-Michael Breen	Lucas Rush	Dave Comeau
Dennis/Record Executive	Adam Dannheisser	Adam Dannheisser	Nick Cordero	Anthony Harkin	Justin Lee Collins	Daniel Fletcher	Troy Burgess	Ryan M. Hunt	Kevin Kennedy	Kent Sheridan
Franz	Wesley Taylor	Wesley Taylor	Travis Walker	Lincoln Hall	Sandy Moffat	Cameron Sharp	Kevin Hegmann	Chris Renalds	Andrew Carthy	Tyler Pearse
Regina/Candi	Lauren Molina	Lauren Molina	Casey Tuma	Francine Cain	Jodie Jacobs	Jessie May	Aly Bloom	Kristina Walz	Rhiannon Chesterman	Steffi D
Stacee Jaxx/Mr. Christian	Will Swenson	James Carpinello	MiG Ayesa	Michael Falzon	Shayne Ward	Ben Richards	Kyle Lowder	Sam Harvey	Sam Ferriday / Kevin Clifton / Antony Costa	Jonathan Cullen
Justice Charlier/Mrs. Christian	Michele Mais	Michele Mais	Teresa Stanley	Rachel Dunham	Rachel McFarlane	Rachel McFarlane	Markesha McCoy	Kenya Hamilton	Zoe Birkett	Louise Camilleri
Hertz	Paul Schoeffler	Paul Schoeffler	Bret Tuomi	David Whitney	Rohan Tickell	Jack Lord	Robert Torti	Andrew Tebo	Vas Constanti	Larry Mannell
Joey Primo	Jeremy Woodard	Jeremy Woodard	Joey Calveri	Alexander Ellis	Dylan Turner	Tom Andrew Hargreaves	Patrick Joyce	Mark Laduke	Alexander Day	
Mayor/Ja'Keith (Paul) Gill	Brian Munn	Andre Ward	Rashad Naylor	Thern Reynolds	Nathan Amzi	Rakesh Boury	Robert Peters	Darrell Percell Jr.	Adam Strong	
Waitress #1	Savannah Wise	Savannah Wise	Angela Brydon	Samantha Hagen	Twinnie-Lee Moore	Abigail Climer	Amanda Miller	Brenna Wahl	Sinead Kenny	
Constance Sack	Nova Bergeron	Katherine Tokarz	Lauralyn McClelland	Melanie Hawkins	Zizi Strallen	Imogen Brooke	Amy Ryerson	Emily Croft	Erin Bell	
Young Groupie (Angel)	Angel Reed	Angel Reed	Lindsay Janisse	Ellen Sutton	Amy Thornton	Kylie Michelle Smith	Allie Meixner	Carlina Parker	Saran Webb	

Notable Broadway replacements

- Drew – Jeremy Jordan
- Sherrie – Savannah Wise, Kerry Butler, Emily Padgett, Becca Tobin, Rebecca Faulkenberry, Ashley Spencer, Kate Rockwell, Katie Webber, Ericka Hunter, Lauren Zakrin
- Franz – Tom Lenk, Frankie Grande
- Stacee Jaxx – Chester See
- Dennis – Dee Snider, Nick Cordero
- Regina – Randi Zuckerberg (Regina only)
- Hertz – Don Stephenson

== Musical numbers ==
Act I

Song	Performer(s)	Original artist
"Cum On Feel the Noize (Pre-Reprise) / Just Like Paradise / Nothin' but a Good Time"	Lonny, Dennis, Drew, Entire Company	Slade / David Lee Roth / Poison
"Sister Christian"	Sherrie, Mrs. Christian, Mr. Christian, Drew, Ensemble	Night Ranger
"We Built This City/Too Much Time on My Hands"	Drew, Dennis, Lonny, Stacee, Regina, Mayor, Franz, Hertz, Company	Starship / Styx
"I Wanna Rock"	Drew, Ensemble	Twisted Sister
"We're Not Gonna Take It"	Regina, Ensemble	Twisted Sister
"More Than Words / To Be with You / Heaven"	Sherrie, Drew, Company	Extreme / Mr. Big / Warrant
"Waiting for a Girl (Boy) Like You"	Drew, Sherrie, Ensemble	Foreigner
"Wanted Dead or Alive"	Stacee, Sherrie, Ensemble	Bon Jovi
"I Want to Know What Love Is"	Stacee, Sherrie, Drew, Ensemble	Foreigner
"Cum On Feel the Noize/We're Not Gonna Take It (Reprise)"	Stacee, Dennis, Sherrie, Regina, Drew, Company	Quiet Riot / Twisted Sister
"Harden My Heart/Shadows of the Night"	Sherrie, Justice, Lonny, Company	Quarterflash / Pat Benatar
"Here I Go Again"	Sherrie, Drew, Stacee, Dennis, Lonny, Regina, Franz, Company	Whitesnake

Act II

Song	Performer(s)	Original artist
"The Final Countdown/We Built This City (Reprise)"	Hertz, Franz, Dennis, Lonny, Regina, Ensemble	Europe / Starship
"Any Way You Want It/I Wanna Rock (Reprise)"	Justice, Sherrie, Drew, Record Executives, Ensemble	Journey / Twisted Sister
"High Enough"	Sherrie, Drew, Company	Damn Yankees
"I Hate Myself for Loving You/Heat of the Moment"	Sherrie, Stacee, Drew, Company	Joan Jett and the Blackhearts / Asia
"Hit Me with Your Best Shot"	Franz, Regina, Hertz, Ensemble	Pat Benatar
"Can't Fight This Feeling"	Dennis, Lonny, Ensemble	REO Speedwagon
"Every Rose Has Its Thorn"	Justice, Sherrie, Drew, Franz, Hertz, Dennis, Lonny, Stacee, Ensemble	Poison
"Keep On Loving You" †	Hertz	REO Speedwagon
"Oh Sherrie"	Drew, Sherrie, Ensemble	Steve Perry
"The Search Is Over"	Drew, Sherrie, Company	Survivor
"Renegade" †	Stacee, Company	Styx
"Don't Stop Believin'"	Sherrie, Drew, Stacee, Lonny, Dennis, Justice, Full Company	Journey

† Not on Original Broadway Cast Recording
‡ The song "Rock of Ages" by Def Leppard is not in the musical because Universal Music Group refused to grant the license. However, the original recording is often played after curtain call.

== Instrumentation ==
The songs are played in the 80s rock music style by the house band, Arsenal, appearing at the back of the stage rather than in the more traditional pit.

== Awards and nominations ==
=== Original Broadway production ===
Year	Award	Category	Nominee	Result
2009	Tony Award	Best Musical		Nominated
2009	Tony Award	Best Performance by a Leading Actor in a Musical	Constantine Maroulis	Nominated
2009	Tony Award	Best Direction of a Musical	Kristin Hanggi	Nominated
2009	Tony Award	Best Costume Design of a Musical	Gregory Gale	Nominated
2009	Tony Award	Best Sound Design of a Musical	Peter Hylenski	Nominated
2009	Outer Critics Circle Award	Outstanding New Broadway Musical		Nominated
2009	Outer Critics Circle Award	Outstanding Featured Actor in a Musical	Wesley Taylor	Nominated
2009	Drama League Award	Distinguished Production of a Musical		Nominated
2009	Theatre World Award		Wesley Taylor	Won

== See also ==
- We Will Rock You
