= The Griswolds' Broadway Vacation =

Musical by David Rossmer and Steve Rosen

- The Musical
- Music: David Rossmer and Steve Rosen
- Lyrics: David Rossmer and Steve Rosen
- Book: David Rossmer and Steve Rosen
- Basis: National Lampoon's Vacation films
- Premiere: September 22, 2022: Seattle, Washington (state), United States

The Griswolds' Broadway Vacation is a musical with a book, music, and lyrics by David Rossmer and Steve Rosen. It is based on the characters from the National Lampoon's Vacation film series.

== Productions ==
Originally titled Broadway Vacation, the musical had an industry reading in November 2019, starring Kerry Butler and Will Swenson.

The musical's world premiere was planned for fall 2020 at the 5th Avenue Theatre in Seattle, but the production was delayed due to the COVID-19 pandemic and rescheduled for fall 2022. It opened on September 22, 2022, after beginning previews on September 13, and closed on October 2. Directed and choreographed by Donna Feore, the premiere production starred Megan Reinking as Ellen and Hunter Foster as Clark. Kate Rockwell was originally slated to play Ellen, but she left the production because of her pregnancy.

The production was expected to move to Houston for a brief engagement at Theatre Under The Stars after its premiere in Seattle, but the production company's creative director announced the cancellation of the Houston run in July 2022.

As of May 2026, the production is awaiting an available Broadway theater. Producer Ken Davenport described the show "waiting for our runway (which is our Broadway theater) to open up," with no opening date, cast, or venue yet confirmed. During the wait, the production team has been conducting script rewrites, reducing the show's budget, and pursuing corporate sponsorships.

== Concept Album ==
In 2025, The Griswolds' Broadway Vacation: Original Concept Album was released digitally on Joy Machine Records, produced by Sonny Paladino and Greg Anthony Rassen with Ken Davenport serving as executive producer. The first single, "We Are the Griswolds," featuring Tony Award winner Santino Fontana as Clark Griswold, was released September 12, 2025, ahead of the full album's release on November 14, 2025. The album also features Kerry Butler as Ellen Griswold, Livvy Marcus as Audrey Griswold, Nathan Levy as Rusty Griswold, Jennifer Cody as Madame Sherie, Alan H. Green as Naked Commando, and Andy Grotelueschen as Cousin Eddie.

Track list (per the same source): Prologue; Vacation; We Are The Griswolds; The Battle of Ellen Hill; Go For It; Get On The Bed; The F Word; You Can Tell Me Anything; Doofus.
