= Six by Sondheim =

- Genre: Documentary
- Directed by: James Lapine; Todd Haynes; Autumn de Wilde
- Starring: Stephen Sondheim; Jarvis Cocker; Audra McDonald; Darren Criss; Jeremy Jordan; Laura Osnes; Jackie Hoffman; America Ferrera; Will Swenson
- Theme music composer: Stephen Sondheim
- Country of origin: United States
- Original language: English

Production
- Editor: Miky Wolf

Original release
- Release: December 9, 2013

Six by Sondheim is an HBO television documentary which pays tribute to Broadway composer and lyricist Stephen Sondheim. The film was directed and co-produced by James Lapine, based on an idea by Frank Rich and "centers on the backstory of six great Sondheim songs".

== Film ==
The film has performances of six of Sondheim's signature songs:

1. "Something's Coming" (West Side Story),
2. "Opening Doors" (Merrily We Roll Along),
3. "Send in the Clowns" (A Little Night Music),
4. "I'm Still Here" (Follies),
5. "Being Alive" (Company) and
6. "Sunday" (Sunday in the Park with George).

In the documentary, Sondheim himself performs along with Audra McDonald, Jeremy Jordan, Darren Criss, America Ferrera, Jackie Hoffman and Laura Osnes. The documentary contains archival footage as well as footage shot for a revue of Sondheim's music that played on Broadway in 2010 titled Sondheim on Sondheim.

The documentary consists of both original short films of several of the songs plus existing material. For example, Lapine directed the part on "Opening Doors" which features Criss, Jordan, Ferrera, and Osnes; Todd Haynes directed the film on "I'm Still Here" which has Jarvis Cocker; and Autumn De Wilde directed McDonald and Will Swenson in "Send in the Clowns." The film was edited by Miky Wolf who gave an interview to The Red Room Podcast on episode 68. This interview was then published in the Summer 2014 The Sondheim Review.

== Reception ==
National Public Radio highly recommended the documentary stating that Six is "a superbly compiled work, overseen by two of the people most intimately familiar with the composer himself...If you're new to the works of Stephen Sondheim, this TV special should entice you. If you're already a fan, it should delight you." TV Guide stated, "Sondheim exults in the 'agonizing fun' of his craft. We can only marvel at the results." The documentary was one of several Peabody Award winners in 2014.
