= Megan Reinking =

American actress

- Occupation(s): Actress, singer
- Years active: 2004–present
- Website: www.meganreinking.com

Megan Reinking is an American stage and television actress. She has appeared on Broadway in multiple shows including Dracula, Lestat, the acclaimed revival of Hair, The People in the Picture and most recently Million Dollar Quartet at New World Stages, as well as featuring in the first season of Boardwalk Empire.

== Career ==
Theatre
Start year	Production	Role	Notes
2004	Bye Bye Birdie	Teenager	Off Broadway Encores! Concert
2004	Dracula, the Musical	Ensemble/First Vampire	Original Broadway production; October 2004 – January 2005
2005	Footloose	Ariel Moore	Marriott Lincolnshire Theatre; August – October 2005
2005	Lestat	Ensemble/Beautiful Woman	Original Broadway production; October 2005 – May 2006
2006	The Children	Suzie	New York Musical Theatre Festival production
2008	Hair	Tribe member Suzannah	Off Broadway, Shakespeare in the Park Revival; June 2008 – September 2008
2009	Hair	Tribe Member Suzannah/Jeanie (Understudy)	Broadway revival; January 2009 – March 2010
2010	Hair	Tribe Member Suzannah/Jeanie (Understudy)/Sheila (Understudy)	West End revival; March – September 2010
2010	Les Enfants de Paris	Fleur de Lys	New York Musical Theatre Festival production; 2010–2011
2011	The People in the Picture	Dobrisch/Ensemble	Original Broadway production; February – June 2011
2011	Million Dollar Quartet	Dyanne (understudy)	Off-Broadway, New World Stages; July 2011 – July 2012
2022	The Griswolds' Broadway Vacation	Ellen	World premiere production, 5th Avenue Theatre; September – October 2022

Concerts
Start year	Production	Role	Notes
2010	Birdland	Performer	Off-Broadway concert

Film
Year	Title	Role	Notes
2014	My Man Is a Loser	Hippie	

Television
Year	Title	Role	Notes
2009	CBS Cares	Tribe Member	1 episode (1 January 2009)
2009	Late Show With David Letterman	Tribe Member	1 episode (Episode 16.131)
2010	Boardwalk Empire	Annabelle	5 episodes (Season 1)
2020	Law and Order: SVU	Maggie Quigley	1 episode (Season 21, Episode 14, 'I Deserve Some Loving Too')
