= Valley Youth Theatre =

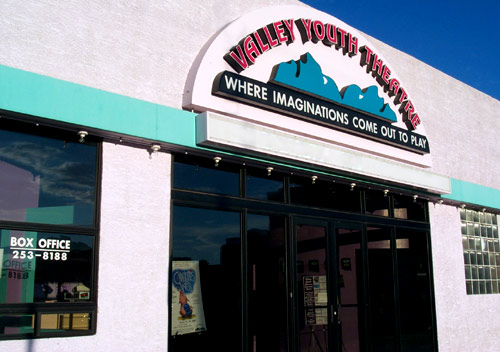
The front of the Valley Youth Theater

Valley Youth Theatre (VYT) is a community theatre located in Phoenix, Arizona, United States. Established in 1989, VYT produces six mainstage shows each season, two of which are produced at the Herberger Theater Center.

An old storefront was gutted in 1998 and rebuilt to include a 30-foot-wide (9.1 m) proscenium stage with orchestra pit, 202-seat continental-style audience seating, a lobby with box office, and "backstage" areas: a lighting and sound booth, small scene and costume shops, and rehearsal and dressing rooms.

== Notable alumni ==
- Emma Stone, Academy Award winner
- Jordin Sparks, Grammy Award nominee
- Chelsea Kane, actress
- Max Crumm, actor
