= Jeremy Jordan (actor, born 1984) =

American actor and singer (born 1984)

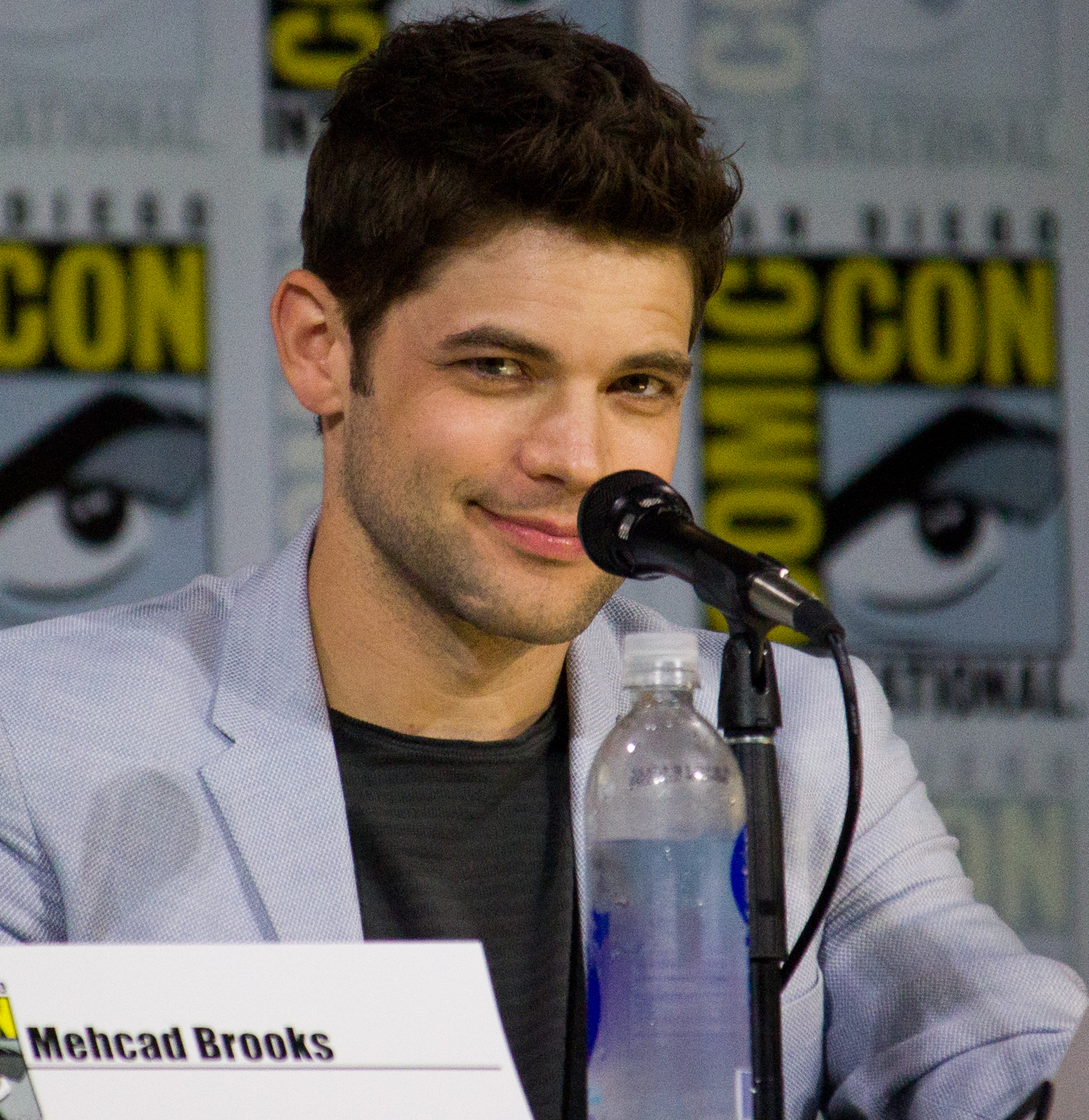
- Jordan in 2017
- Born: Jeremy Michael Jordan; November 20, 1984 (age 41); Corpus Christi, Texas, U.S.
- Education: Ithaca College (BFA)
- Occupations: Actor, singer
- Years active: 1996–present
- Known for: Newsies, The Great Gatsby, Floyd Collins, Supergirl
- Spouse: Ashley Spencer (m. 2012)
- Children: 1

Jeremy Michael Jordan (born November 20, 1984) is an American actor and singer. He has performed on Broadway, in television and film, in concert, as well as in other theatrical productions.

Jordan made his Broadway debut in 2009 as part of Rock of Ages. Subsequently, he went to star in the original Broadway musicals Bonnie & Clyde (2011) as Clyde Barrow and Newsies (2012) as Jack Kelly, the latter of which he gained him nominations for a Tony Award and a Grammy Award. He played the titular character in the Broadway premiere of Floyd Collins in 2025, which earned him his second Tony Award nomination. He also starred in the Broadway casts of the musicals West Side Story (2009) as Tony, Waitress (2019) as Dr. Jim Pomatter, The Great Gatsby (2024) as Jay Gatsby, and Just in Time (2026) as Bobby Darin. He additionally appeared in the 2018 Broadway play American Son. In 2021 and 2023, he starred as Seymour Krelborn in the Off-Broadway revival of Little Shop of Horrors.

On screen, he starred opposite Anna Kendrick in the 2014 musical film The Last Five Years and as Jimmy Collins in the NBC series Smash (2013). From 2015 to 2021, he played Winslow "Winn" Schott Jr. on the CBS/CW DC Comics-based superhero drama series Supergirl. From 2017 to 2020, he voiced Varian in the Disney Channel animated series Rapunzel's Tangled Adventure. Since 2024, he has voiced Lucifer Morningstar in the adult animated musical series Hazbin Hotel, for which he received an Annie Award nomination for Best Voice Acting - TV/Media.

== Early life and education ==
Jordan was born on November 20, 1984, in Corpus Christi, Texas, where he was raised. His parents divorced when he was young, and he lived in low-income housing, with his brother, Joey, sister, Jessa, and mother, Debbie (née Stone). His stepmother died in a car crash when he was in 7th grade. Jordan was injured in the same crash and started to pursue singing when he had to take a break from sports during his recovery.

His father is of British and German descent, while his mother's descent is from Jewish emigrants from Eastern Europe. He is Jewish. He was an excellent student, graduating from Mary Carroll High School, where he was active in choir. He graduated from Ithaca College, in Ithaca, New York, with a Bachelor of Fine Arts in musical theatre.

== Stage career ==
=== 2008–2010: Early career, Broadway debut and West Side Story ===
Jordan sang as a teenager and began acting in high school. In 2008, he starred as Alex in The Little Dog Laughed at Hartford Theatreworks, for which he received a Connecticut Critics Circle nomination. Later that year, he played Tom Sawyer in Big River at the Goodspeed Opera House in Connecticut. He appeared in the Broadway cast of Rock of Ages in 2009.

Jordan was an alternate for the leading role of Tony in the 2009 Broadway revival of West Side Story. He also starred as Clyde Barrow in the 2010 pre-Broadway Sarasota, Florida, tryout of the new musical Bonnie & Clyde by Frank Wildhorn and Don Black. He also played the role of Jason Dean (J.D) at Joe’s Pub for the concert performance of Heathers: The Musical from September 13 to 14, 2010.

=== 2011–2018: Newsies, Bonnie & Clyde, Tony nomination and further success ===
He reprised the role of Clyde when Bonnie & Clyde opened on Broadway on December 1, 2011. The show closed on December 30, 2011, after 36 performances.

Jordan played Jack in the stage version of Newsies at the Paper Mill Playhouse in New Jersey in September and October 2011. Jordan reprised the lead role as Jack Kelly in Disney's Newsies on Broadway, with music by Alan Menken, lyrics by Jack Feldman, and book by Harvey Fierstein. Newsies opened at the Nederlander Theatre on March 29, 2012. For the role, Jordan was nominated for the 2012 Tony Award for Best Performance by a Leading Actor in a Musical. He was nominated for a 2013 Grammy Award for Best Musical Theatre Album as a principal soloist on the Newsies original cast album.

He appeared in the Stephen Sondheim and Wynton Marsalis staged concert A Bed and A Chair for Encores! at New York City Center from November 13 to 17, 2013, along with Norm Lewis and Bernadette Peters. In December 2013, Jordan appeared in Hit List, a concert presentation of the fictional musical created for the second season of Smash. He has performed at 54 Below in New York City many times as both a soloist and with his Smash costars. On February 16, 2015, Jordan starred as Leo Frank, opposite Laura Benanti as Lucille Frank, Joshua Henry as Jim Conley, and Ramin Karimloo as Tom Watson, in the concert production of Parade, also written by Jason Robert Brown, at the Lincoln Center's Avery Fisher Hall. Jordan was featured as Light Yagami in the 2014/2015 English concept album of Death Note: The Musical.

In June 2016, Jordan reprised his role as Tony in the Hollywood Bowl concerts of West Side Story, alongside Karen Olivo and George Akram.

In October 2018, Jordan appeared in the play American Son, on Broadway alongside Kerry Washington and Steven Pasquale, a role he and the others reprised in the play's 2019 Netflix film adaptation.

=== 2019–present: West End debut, further Broadway leading credits, and second Tony nomination ===
In summer 2019, Jordan starred in the musical Waitress on Broadway as Dr. Pomatter alongside Shoshana Bean as Jenna. In April 2021, he gave an interview on The Theatre Podcast with Alan Seales, discussing his 54/Below cabaret show "Carry On". The show was released digitally in 2020, and went on to be acclaimed by both critics and audiences.

In 2021, Jordan played Seymour in the reopening cast of the Off-Broadway revival production of Little Shop of Horrors after the COVID-19 pandemic. In January 2022, he reprised his role of Clyde in Bonnie & Clyde for a one night only concert in London's West End. He reprised his role in Little Shop of Horrors for an eight-week engagement in 2023 beginning on July 25 with his final performance on September 17.

In July 2023, it was announced that Jordan and Eva Noblezada will star in a new musical adaptation of F. Scott Fitzgerald's The Great Gatsby. The show features music and lyrics by Jason Howland and Nathan Tysen and a book by Kait Kerrigan. The musical premiered at the Paper Mill Playhouse on October 12 of the same year, with a planned Broadway transfer that started previews on March 29, 2024, at the Broadway Theatre with an official opening night scheduled for April 25. Jordan left the cast in January 2025 with Ryan McCartan taking over the role, and from November 2025 to March 2026, he rejoined the cast.

In November 2024, it was announced Jordan would star in the Broadway premiere of Floyd Collins in the title role at the Vivian Beaumont Theatre, which ran from March 2025 to June 2025. His performance received acclaim and earned him multiple award nominations, including his second Tony Award nomination.

On April 21, 2026, he replaced Matthew Morrison as Bobby Darin in Just in Time on Broadway at the Circle in the Square Theatre. His run will extended until October 18, 2026, when he was replaced by Matthew Morrison for a limited run.

== Film and television career ==
=== 2008–2012: Early success and Smash ===
Jordan made a 2008 television appearance, guest-starring on NBC's Law & Order: Special Victims Unit in the episode "Streetwise". He starred in the Warner Bros. film Joyful Noise, opposite Queen Latifah, Keke Palmer, and Dolly Parton. The film opened on January 13, 2012. It was announced in June 2012 that Jordan would join the cast of NBC's Smash for season two playing Jimmy. He filmed episodes for Smash while performing in Newsies until his final performance in the musical on September 4.

=== 2013–2022: The Last Five Years, Supergirl and Rapunzel's Tangled Adventure ===
Jordan played Jamie Wellerstein in The Last Five Years, a film adaptation of the musical of the same name, written by Jason Robert Brown, costarring Anna Kendrick as Cathy Hiatt. The film was shot over three weeks in June 2013, and released in February 2015. In 2015, Jordan was cast as Winslow "Winn" Schott Jr. on Supergirl. The premiere on CBS was watched by 12.96 million viewers and received a full season order on November 30, 2015. Jordan received praise for his performance on the show, which would move to The CW after the first season. He stayed on as series regular for two subsequent seasons. In early 2016, Benj Pasek and Justin Paul approached Jordan to sing the part of Phillip Carlyle in a read through of The Greatest Showman, since Jordan recorded demos for the film in 2015. The day before the read-through, the star Hugh Jackman underwent nasal surgery and was ordered by his doctor not to sing. Pasek and Paul asked Jordan to also sing the leading part of PT Barnum while Jackman acted out the scenes, to which Jordan agreed (though Jackman did break in to sing “From Now On”).

From 2017 to 2020, he voiced Varian in Disney's Rapunzel's Tangled Adventure.

On June 20, 2019, it was reported that Jordan would be starring as Casablanca Records founder Neil Bogart in the upcoming biopic Spinning Gold.

On July 15, 2020, it was announced that Jordan would star in the upcoming Hallmark Channel film Holly and Ivy, alongside Janel Parrish and Marisol Nichols. The film was released on November 1, 2020, on Hallmark Movies & Mysteries. On January 3, 2021, it was announced that Jordan would star in another Hallmark Channel film Mix Up in the Mediterranean, alongside Jessica Lowndes. The film was released on February 20, 2021. Jordan announced via social media that he would be starting a band, Age of Madness, which released their first album in spring 2022.

=== 2023–present: Hazbin Hotel and success in voice acting ===
In 2023, in the wake of the October 7 attacks, Jordan collaborated with other artists in support of Israeli hostages with a rendition of "Bring Him Home" from Les Misérables.

Since 2024, Jordan has voiced Lucifer Morningstar, King of Hell, in the SpindleHorse Toons/A24 adult animated musical comedy-drama series Hazbin Hotel, airing on Amazon Prime Video, alongside Erika Henningsen as Lucifer's daughter Charlie. He reprised the role in Hazbin Hotel on Broadway for a one-night only concert at the Majestic Theatre on October 20, 2025.

He also voices Steve Harrington in the series Stranger Things: Tales from '85 (2026).

== Personal life ==
Jordan married Broadway actress and singer Ashley Spencer at the Basilica of Saint John the Baptist in Canton, Ohio, on September 8, 2012. They have a daughter, born in 2019.

== Filmography ==
=== Film ===
Year	Film	Role	Notes
2007	Common Change	Joel	Short film
2012	Joyful Noise	Randy Garrity	
2013	Six by Sondheim	Charley Kringas	
2014	The Last Five Years	Jamie Wellerstein	
2015	Emily & Tim	Raymond Phayer	
2017	Newsies: The Broadway Musical	Jack Kelly	Filmed stage production
2019	American Son	Paul Larkin	
2023	Spinning Gold	Neil Bogart	
2024	Bonnie and Clyde: The Musical	Clyde Barrow	Filmed stage production

=== Television ===
Year	Title	Role	Notes
2008	Law & Order: Special Victims Unit	Doug Walshen	Episode: "Streetwise"
2011	Submissions Only	Levi Murney	Episode: "The Miller/Hennigan Act"
2013	Smash	Jimmy Collins	Lead role (season 2)
2013	Elementary	Joey Castoro	Episode: "Solve for X"
2015	Law & Order: Special Victims Unit	Skye Adderson	Episode: "Agent Provocateur"
2015–2018, 2020–2021	Supergirl	Winslow "Winn" Schott, Jr.	Series regular (seasons 1–3); Guest (seasons 5 and 6)
2017–2020	Tangled: The Series	Varian (voice)	Recurring role
2017	The Flash	Grady, General Winslow "Winn" Schott, Jr. (Earth-X)	2 episodes
2020	A Killer Party	Himself	Web series
2020	Holly and Ivy	Adam Yeager	Television film
2021	Mix Up in the Mediterranean	Josh and Julian Northrup	Television film
2022	Hanukkah on Rye	Jacob	Television film
2023	SuperKitties	Otto (singing voice)	Episode: "Roboctopus"
2024–present	Hazbin Hotel	Lucifer Morningstar (voice)	8 episodes
2024	Megamind Rules!	Bennett Schlurg-Peterman (voice)	3 episodes
2026	Stranger Things: Tales from '85	Steve Harrington (voice)	Series regular
2026	Sofia the First: Royal Magic	Sage (voice)	Guest role

== Stage credits ==
Year	Title	Role	Venue	Notes
2008	The Little Dog Laughed	Alex	Hartford TheatreWorks	Regional
2008	Big River	Tom Sawyer	Goodspeed Musicals; September 26 - November 30, 2008	Regional
2009	Rock of Ages	Swing u/s Drew u/s Franz u/s Joey Primo u/s Stacee Jaxx	Brooks Atkinson Theatre; March 17, 2009 – December 13, 2009	Broadway debut; original cast
2009	West Side Story	Tony (alternate)	Palace Theatre; December 16, 2009 – October 10, 2010	Broadway replacement
2010	Heathers: The Musical	Jason “J.D.” Dean	Joe's Pub; September 13 - 14, 2010	Workshop
2010	Bonnie & Clyde	Clyde Barrow	The Mertz Theatre; November 12 – December 19, 2010	Regional, pre-Broadway
2011	Newsies	Jack Kelly	Paper Mill Playhouse; September 15 – October 16, 2011	Regional, pre-Broadway
2011	Bonnie & Clyde	Clyde Barrow	Gerald Schoenfeld Theatre; November 4, 2011 – December 30, 2011	Original Broadway cast
2012	Newsies	Jack Kelly	Nederlander Theatre; March 15, 2012 – September 4, 2012	Original Broadway cast
2013	A Bed and a Chair: A New York Love Affair	Male 2	New York City Center; November 13 - 17, 2013	Off-Broadway
2014	Children of Eden	Cain / Japheth	Kennedy Center; May 19, 2014	Concert
2014	Finding Neverland	J. M. Barrie	A.R.T Theatre; July 23, 2014 – September 28, 2014	Regional, pre-Broadway
2014	Death Note: The Musical	Light	-	English concept album
2015	Parade	Leo Frank	Lincoln Center; February 16, 2015	Concert
2015	Bombshell	Performer	The Actors Fund	Concert
2016	West Side Story	Tony	Hollywood Bowl; July 14–19, 2016	Staged Concert
2016	Newsies	Jack Kelly	Pantages Theatre; September 11, 2016	Filmed
2018	Tarrytown	Brom	MCC Theater	Reading
2018	American Son	Paul Larkin	Booth Theatre; November 4, 2018 – January 27, 2019	Original Broadway cast
2019	Waitress	Dr. Jim Pomatter	Brooks Atkinson Theatre; April 8 – June 2, 2019	Broadway replacement
2021	Little Shop of Horrors	Seymour Krelborn	Westside Theatre; September 21, 2021 – January 9, 2022	Off-Broadway replacement
2022	Bonnie & Clyde	Clyde Barrow	Theatre Royal, Drury Lane; January 17–18, 2022	West End debut
2023	Little Shop of Horrors	Seymour Krelborn	Westside Theatre; July 25 – September 17, 2023	Off-Broadway replacement
2023	The Great Gatsby	Jay Gatsby	Paper Mill Playhouse; October 12 – November 12, 2023	Pre-Broadway Tryout
2024	The Great Gatsby	Jay Gatsby	Broadway Theatre; March 29, 2024 – January 19, 2025	Original Broadway cast
2025	Floyd Collins	Floyd Collins	Vivian Beaumont Theatre; March 27 – June 22, 2025	Original Broadway cast
2025	The Great Gatsby	Jay Gatsby	Broadway Theatre; November 10, 2025 – March 7, 2026	Broadway replacement
2026	Just In Time	Bobby Darin	Circle in the Square Theatre; April 21 – October 18, 2026	Broadway replacement

== Awards and nominations ==
Year	Award	Category	Nominated work	Result
2012	Drama League Award	Distinguished Performance	Bonnie & Clyde	Nominated
2012	Theatre World Awards	Outstanding Debut	Bonnie & Clyde	Won
2012	Tony Award	Best Actor in a Musical	Newsies	Nominated
2012	Drama Desk Award	Outstanding Actor in a Musical	Newsies	Nominated
2012	Drama League Award	Distinguished Performance	Newsies	Nominated
2012	Outer Critics Circle Award	Outstanding Actor in a Musical	Newsies	Nominated
2015	IRNE Awards	Large Theater: Best Actor (Musical)	Finding Neverland	Won
2025	Annie Awards	Best Voice Acting - TV/Media	Hazbin Hotel episode "Dad Beat Dad"	Nominated
2025	Outer Critics Choice Awards	Outstanding Lead Performer in a Musical	Floyd Collins	Nominated
2025	Drama Desk Awards	Outstanding Lead Performance in a Musical	Floyd Collins	Nominated
2025	Tony Awards	Best Actor in a Musical	Floyd Collins	Nominated
