= Max Crumm =

American actor and singer (born 1985)

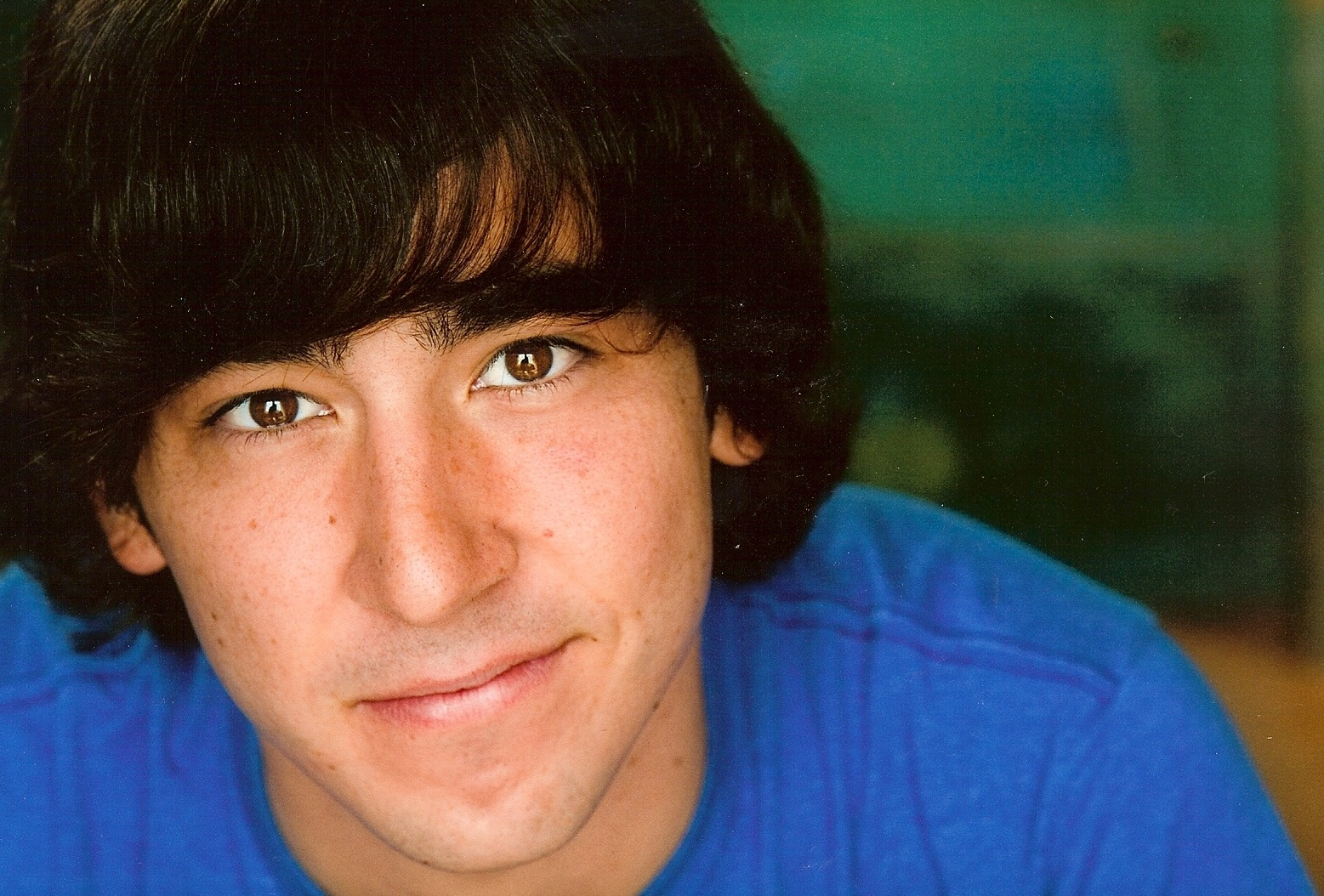
- Crumm in 2006
- Born: Aaron Maximillian Crumm; October 8, 1985 (age 40); Pasadena, California, U.S.
- Occupations: Actor; singer
- Years active: 1992–present

Aaron Maximillian Crumm (born October 8, 1985) is an American actor and singer known for their work on the New York City stage. They have originated starring roles on Broadway in both the revival of Grease as Danny Zuko, after winning NBC's talent search competition, Grease: You're the One That I Want!, and in Seth Rudetsky's Disaster! as Scott, after playing the role Off-Broadway. Crumm also played starring roles in The Fantasticks as Matt, The Evolution Of Mann as Henry Mann, Hot Mess as Max, Brooklyn Crush as Christian Mohammed Schwartzelberg, and in Jersey Shoresical as The Situation.

== Early life and education ==
Crumm was born in Pasadena, California and grew up in Phoenix, Arizona. They were cast in their first musical, Anything Goes, at the age of 6, as a tap dancing sailor with their parents' theatre company, Ahwatukee Foothills Theatre. Also with their parents' company, Crumm played Jack in Into the Woods and the Wizard in The Wizard of Oz.

Once they were older, Crumm ventured into children's theatre in Downtown Phoenix, and started out in a children's sketch comedy group at Valley Youth Theatre. Crumm then went on to be cast in Grease (twice; once as Doody, once as Kenickie), Titanic and The Wiz in the main stage productions at The Herberger, also with Valley Youth Theatre. At Desert Stages Theatre, they played the Grinch in How the Grinch Stole Christmas!, the Prince in Cinderella, Linus van Pelt in You're a Good Man, Charlie Brown and numerous roles in original musicals created by owner Gerry Cullity. Crumm was also part of a traveling group of performers affiliated with Desert Stages.

They graduated from Desert Vista High School in 2003 and then moved to Los Angeles, with their best friend Kelly May, to pursue a career in acting, by attending the American Academy of Dramatic Arts in Hollywood.

== Career ==
In March 2006, Crumm landed a principal role in the indie-film Echoboom. On July 24, 2007, they made their Broadway debut in Grease as Danny Zuko, alongside the female winner Laura Osnes as Sandy. After a year on Broadway, Crumm and Osnes played their final performances as Danny and Sandy on July 20, 2008. They were both replaced by Grease: You're the One that I Want! runner-up Ashley Spencer and Derek Keeling.

While in Los Angeles, they took a temporary hiatus from theatre to appear in several films. Crumm appeared in the Screen Gems comedy, Easy A, as Pontius; the film co-starred Max's childhood friend Emma Stone and Amanda Bynes, and was released in the fall of 2010.

Shortly after returning to New York City in 2011, Crumm starred in the original musical JERSEY SHOREsical: A Frickin' Rock Opera as "The Situation". The musical was written by Daniel Franzese, Hanna LoPatin and directed by Drew Droege. The cast also featured RuPaul's Drag Race star Derrick Barry. Shoresical ran from September 21 to 24, 2011, at the New York Fringe festival.

In March 2013, Crumm originated the lead role of Christian Mohammed Schwartzelberg in the off-Broadway rock musical F#%king Up Everything.

On July 29, 2013, Crumm took part in the reading of new comedy play, You're Really Not Helping alongside Daphne Rubin-Vega, Kevin Spirtas, and Aaron Simon Gross. Crumm appeared on the popular web series "It Could Be Worse", created by fellow Broadway actors, Wesley Taylor and Mitchell Jarvis.

In February 2014, Crumm joined the cast of the Off-Broadway production of the musical, Disaster! for 2 months until it closed in April 2014. On April 27, 2014, Crumm was cast as Hoover in the reading of "Brave New World: The Musical", which was adapted from the classic Aldous Huxley novel of the same name. The reading took place in Manhattan. The cast at this private reading included Colin Hanlon as Director Thomas Mond, Andrew Keenan-Bolger as Bernard, Andrew Kober as John, Julia Mattison as Lenina and Keala Settle as Linda. Also, in April 2014, it was announced that Crumm would play Linus, a new series regular on season 2 of the popular web series WALLFLOWERS, shown on www.Stage17.tv (a new website for Broadway themed television shows).

On July 8, 2014, Crumm took over the lead male role of Matt in The Fantasticks Off-Broadway at the Snapple Theater Center complex in the heart of Times Square.

They continued with Disaster! as Scott through its Broadway production, which opened in March 2016.

== Personal life ==
In January 2021, Crumm publicly came out as non-binary, using the pronouns they/them.

== Filmography ==
=== Film ===
Year	Title	Role	Notes
2006	Echoboom	Goldberg	
2008	Ornaments	Douglas	
2010	Easy A	Pontius	
2020	Killing Diaz	Rubin/Rubi	
2021	Burning Man: The Musical	Chadwick Edmund Wickowski	

=== Television ===
Year	Title	Role	Notes
2007	Grease: You're the One That I Want!	Themself	Won the role of Danny Zuko on Broadway
2011	Darla	Dean Prickett	comedy web series
2013	Wallflowers	Linus	6 episodes; web series
2018	Deception	Stevie	Episode: "The Unseen Hand"
2018	Ray Donovan	Parker	Episodes: "Ellis Island" and "He Be Tight. He Be Mean."
2019	Emergence	David	Episode: "Camera Wheelbarrow Tiger Pillow"
2024	Elsbeth	Lonny	Episode: "One Angry Woman"
