= Kirsten Wyatt =

American singer and stage actress (born c. 1975)

- Born: c. 1975 (age 50–51)
- Education: University of Cincinnati College-Conservatory of Music
- Occupations: Actress, singer
- Years active: 1999-present
- Spouse: Sean Nowell

Kirsten Wyatt (born c. 1975) is an American singer and stage actress. She portrayed Frenchy in the 2007 Broadway revival of Grease.

== Biography ==
Wyatt grew up in Clarksburg, West Virginia. Since completing her training at the University of Cincinnati College-Conservatory of Music in 1997, Wyatt has appeared in a number of Broadway productions. She played the Shoemaker's Elf in Shrek The Musical replacing Jennifer Cody on July 14, 2009. Her Broadway premiere was as the understudy for Kristin Chenoweth (Sally Brown) and Ilana Levine (Lucy van Pelt) in the 1999 revival of You're a Good Man, Charlie Brown. Other notable Broadway roles include Little Becky Two Shoes in Urinetown and Allison and Anna in High Fidelity. She appeared in the ensemble of the musical adaptation of Elf: The Musical on Broadway in 2010 and in 2013 joined the Broadway revival of Annie as "Lily St. Regis".

Wyatt has also been a member of the national touring casts of Urinetown and The Boy Friend (directed by Julie Andrews). Her regional credits include Peter in Peter Pan and Eponine in Les Misérables. She also performed in The Joe Iconis Rock 'n Roll Jamboree. She also hosts "Broadway Nosh", a Broadway themed cooking vlog, on Broadway.com.

She is married to musician Sean Nowell.
