= Grease: You're the One That I Want! =

NBC TV Series

- Created by: BBC Worldwide; David Ian
- Presented by: Billy Bush; Denise van Outen
- Judges: Kathleen Marshall; Jim Jacobs; David Ian
- Country of origin: United States
- Original language: English
- No. of seasons: 1
- No. of episodes: 11

Production
- Running time: 42 minutes
- Production companies: BBC Worldwide; Nederlander Television & Film Productions; Phoenix Productions

Original release
- Network: NBC
- Release: January 7 – March 25, 2007

Grease: You're the One That I Want! is an NBC reality television series designed to cast the lead roles of Sandy Dumbrowski and Danny Zuko in a $10 million Broadway revival of the 1971 musical Grease directed and choreographed by two-time Tony Award-winner Kathleen Marshall. The Broadway production began previews at the Brooks Atkinson Theatre on July 24, 2007, and officially opened on August 19.

The TV show, from the producers of Dancing with the Stars, was patterned after an original format created by Andrew Lloyd Webber for the BBC series How Do You Solve a Problem Like Maria?, which selected the lead in the successful 2006 West End revival of The Sound of Music. The show's title was taken from the song "You're the One That I Want" from the 1978 screen adaptation of Grease. Although the song was not part of the original Broadway production, the revival added the songs written for the film to those written for the original Broadway production.

The first episode opened with 11.59 million viewers, which put it in fourth place amongst U.S. network viewing. The television program was usually last in its time slot, but it was effective at generating advance sales of US$8 Million by the finale.

== Tryouts, competition, and casting ==
The show held open auditions in Chicago, New York City and Los Angeles in October and November 2006. The show followed the successes and failures of performers of varying quality and experience through the audition process. The show's hosts, Access Hollywood anchor Billy Bush and British actress/presenter Denise van Outen, encouraged and interviewed the auditioners.

The applicants were whittled down to 50, who attended "Grease Academy" for intensive training and testing, particularly in voice and dance. From these, 12 contestants were selected by the judges. The panel of three judges consisted of director/choreographer Kathleen Marshall, Grease co-writer Jim Jacobs, and British producer David Ian. In addition, later episodes of the show featured guest judges Olivia Newton-John, Andrew Lloyd Webber, Jon Secada, and Rob Marshall, as well as guest performer Frankie Avalon. The number of contestants rose to 14 in the fourth episode when two previously eliminated contestants, Matt Nolan and Ashley Anderson, were brought back and given a second chance.

The first episode aired in a 90-minute format at 8:00 pm Eastern U.S. time on January 7, 2007. Subsequent episodes of the limited-run series were one hour long. After the judges had selected the contestants, viewer voting began at the end of the first live show, which aired on January 28. Each week, the contestants were coached on a performance skill – singing, dancing or acting. The contestants' performances were then critiqued by the judges, after which the viewers voted for their favorite performers. The two lowest vote recipients in each group from the previous week were required to compete in a "sing-off", on the next episode, where the judges chose which two should be allowed to remain in the competition, and which two would be eliminated. At the end of each episode, the eliminated Danny sang "Sandy" as his grand exit, and the eliminated Sandy sang "Goodbye to Sandra Dee" as her grand exit with the remaining contestants singing backup.

In the season finale on March 25, 2007, judge Kathleen Marshall stated that if she would have had to choose two performers at the end of the "Grease Academy" section, she would have chosen Julianna and Derek. However, by the time of the finale she was quite vocal in wanting Max and Laura as her "Danny" and "Sandy". Fortunately for her, it was announced that the program's viewing audience agreed as they had chosen contestants Laura Osnes and Max Crumm to star, respectively, as Sandy and Danny. The runners up were, respectively, Ashley Spencer and Austin Miller. Osnes and Crumm stayed with the Broadway company till July 20, 2008. Two days later Ashley Spencer and Derek Keeling took over the roles of Sandy and Danny. Allie Schulz understudied the roles of Sandy, Cha-Cha, and Patty on Broadway and originated the role Rizzo in the national tour of Grease with Eric Schneider as Danny and Emily Padgett as Sandy. Season 5 American Idol winner Taylor Hicks performed as the Teen Angel. The Broadway production ended on January 4, 2009, after 31 previews and 554 performances.

== Contestants ==
=== The Sandys ===
Name	Color	Nickname	Status
Laura Osnes	Yellow	Small Town Sandy	Winner
Ashley Spencer	Green	Ballerina Sandy	Second place
Allie Schulz	Pink	Baby Sandy	Third place
Kathleen Monteleone	Orange	Spiritual Sandy	Eliminated March 4, 2007
Kate Rockwell	Light Blue	Serious Sandy	Eliminated February 25, 2007
Juliana Hansen	Lavender	Rock Chick Sandy	Eliminated February 18, 2007
Ashley Anderson	Hot Pink	Emotional Sandy	Eliminated February 11, 2007

=== The Dannys ===
Name	Color	Nickname	Status
Max Crumm	Orange	Slacker Danny	Winner
Austin Miller	Red	Hot Danny	Second place
Derek Keeling	Blue	Wholesome Danny	Third place
Chad Doreck	Turquoise	Ambitious Danny	Eliminated March 11, 2007
Kevin Greene	Green	Bellhop Danny	Eliminated February 25, 2007
Jason Celaya	Purple	Boy Band Danny	Eliminated February 18, 2007
Matt Nolan	Grey	Second Chance Danny	Eliminated February 11, 2007

== Solo performances ==
- "All By Myself" by Celine Dion
- "All That Jazz" from Chicago
- "Burning Love" by Elvis Presley
- "Can You Feel the Love Tonight?" from The Lion King
- "Can't Help Fallin' in Love" by Elvis Presley
- "Don't Know Much" by Aaron Neville and Linda Ronstadt
- "Don't Leave Me This Way" by Thelma Houston
- "Ease on Down the Road" from The Wiz
- "Endless Love" by Lionel Richie and Diana Ross
- "Faith" by George Michael
- "The First Cut is the Deepest" by Sheryl Crow
- "Fun, Fun, Fun" by The Beach Boys
- "Hard to Handle" by Otis Redding
- "Heaven" by Bryan Adams
- "(I've Had) The Time of My Life" by Bill Medley and Jennifer Warnes
- "I Love Rock and Roll" by Joan Jett
- "It's in His Kiss (The Shoop Shoop Song)"
- "It Takes Two" by Marvin Gaye and Tammi Terrell
- "Mony Mony" by Billy Idol
- "Phantom of the Opera" from The Phantom of the Opera
- "Pretty Woman" by Roy Orbison
- "Signed, Sealed, Delivered" by Stevie Wonder
- "Suddenly I See" by KT Tunstall
- "Summer of '69" by Bryan Adams
- "Superstar" from Jesus Christ Superstar
- "Suspicious Minds" by Elvis Presley
- "Take that Look Of Your Face" from Tell Me on a Sunday
- "These Boots are Made for Walking" by Nancy Sinatra
- "Walkin' in Memphis" by Marc Cohn
- "Why Do Fools Fall in Love" by Diana Ross
- "You Keep Me Hangin' On" by The Supremes
- "(You Make Me Feel Like) A Natural Woman" by Aretha Franklin
- "You're Still the One" by Shania Twain
- "(You're the) Devil in Disguise" by Elvis Presley

== Group performances ==
- Week 1: "You're The One That I Want!"/"We Go Together"
- Week 2: "Summer Nights"
- Week 3: "Born to Hand Jive"
- Week 4 (Sandy Night): "Look at Me, I'm Sandra Dee"
- Week 5 (Danny Night): "Greased Lightning"
- Week 6: "Grease (is the Word)"
- Week 7: "Rock and Roll is Here to Stay"
- Week 8:

- "We Go Together"/"You're The One That I Want!" (finalists only)
- "Born to Hand Jive" (eliminated contestants only)
- "Greased Lightning" (winner only; Danny)
- "Hopelessly Devoted to You" (winner only; Sandy)
- "Summer Nights" (group reunion)
- "You're The One That I Want!" (finale)

== Sing-off performances ==
- Week 2: "Tears on My Pillow"
- Week 3: "Those Magic Changes"
- Week 4 (Sandy Night): "Blue Moon"
- Week 5 (Danny Night): "It's Raining on Prom Night"
- Week 6: "Rock and Roll Party Queen"

== Reception ==
The first episode was watched by 11.59 million viewers, but was unfavorably reviewed by critics. Viewership declined, and the critics' favorites were not the final winners.

East Bay Times reporter Susan Young compared the show unfavorably to American Idol, noting the differences in viewership of 8 million to Idol's 40 million, as well as not "humiliating people" as the American Idol judges do. The Washington Post television critic Tom Shales said, "To call this "reality television" is truly stretching the term to the outer limit of meaninglessness. To call it "good television" would be to risk being struck by lightning." The New York Post television writer Austin Smith attacked the format and stock characters of the show, "...Then there's the stereotype of the plucky fat girl – two of them in tomorrow's show - ... Although it's a foregone conclusion that neither will land the role of Sandy, at least the chubbettes don't shed any tears. That's more than I can say about some of the male contestants on this show, who blubber as if their lives had ended." The New York Post theater critic Michael Riedel posted negative reviews after the second episode stating, "Working actors think it demeans their profession, while the industry’s movers and shakers say it makes the theater business look tacky and cheap." After the finale, Riedel again gave a negative review, stating, "The rest of Broadway was put off by the cheesy production values, poorly staged musical numbers and cookie-cutter nobodies who auditioned to play Danny and Sandy. Crumm ... and Osnes are notable only because they were the least attractive of the lot." Although Riedel did admit that the show did better numbers than the Tony Awards, the otherwise most important television show about the New York Broadway scene.

By the time rehearsals were underway in July 2007, and advance sales had reached US$14.2 million, Gordon Cox of Variety reported the TV show had achieved the goal of promoting a Broadway show.

== Other versions ==
=== United Kingdom ===
A similar show was broadcast in the United Kingdom during the first half of 2007. Grease Is the Word was broadcast on ITV, with judges David Ian (the producer and man behind the revival), David Gest, 1980s singer Sinitta, and American dance icon Brian Friedman. Starting on 7 April 2007 the show followed a similar format to that of the American one. On 11 June 2007, Danny Bayne and Susan McFadden were named as the new Danny and Sandy, to act in the West End revival at the London's Piccadilly Theatre from Wednesday, 8 August 2007.

=== Israel ===
A similar show was broadcast in Israel in 2008. Grease was broadcast on Channel 2, with judges Hanny Nahmias and Assaf Amdursky.

=== Netherlands ===
A similar format has been used as well in The Netherlands in 2022, with the show Op zoek naar Danny & Sandy (Looking for Danny & Sandy) taking 2 unknown singers and placing the winners in the 2 lead roles for the 2023 performance of Grease in The Netherlands. Contestants included Melissa Peters, Jeffrey Zwaan, Wendela van Sprundel, Lya Luca, Dylan Meischke, Davy Reedijk, Jarno Korf, Imahni Tsolakis, Shay Lachman, Aimée de Pater, Paul Morris, Dominique de Bont, Victor Lammertijn, Magtel de Laat, Tristan van der Lingen and Danique Graanoogst. In the final, on 3 February, Tristan van der Lingen and Danique Graanoogst were announced as the winners of the series.
