= Ashley Spencer (actress) =

American actress, singer, and dancer

- Born: March 8, 1985 (age 40)
- Occupations: Actress, singer, dancer
- Years active: 2007–present
- Spouse: Jeremy Jordan (m. 2012)
- Children: 1

Ashley Marie Spencer (born March 8, 1985) is an American actress, singer, and dancer. Spencer was a contestant on the 2007 NBC show Grease: You're the One that I Want! She was the understudy for Barbie in the Barbie in Fairytopia tour, in which she sang and danced ballet.

== Career ==
=== Grease: You're the One that I Want! ===
Spencer was known as "Ballerina Sandy" because of her ballet background. She made it to the finals, where she came in second place behind Laura Osnes.

=== Hairspray ===
Spencer made her Broadway debut in July 2007 as Amber Von Tussle in Hairspray, replacing Brynn O'Malley. She played her final performance as Amber in the Broadway company on July 13, 2008, after being in the production for a year. She was succeeded by Aubrey O'Day. She reprised the role of Amber in The Muny production of Hairspray in St. Louis which ran from August 3–9, 2009. She played the role again at Pittsburgh CLO's production of Hairspray, which ran from July 20 to August 1, 2010.

=== Grease ===
It was announced on June 25, 2008, that Spencer would replace Laura Osnes as Sandy in the Broadway production of Grease. She began her run on July 22, 2008, and co-starred opposite Derek Keeling as Danny. Keeling was also a runner-up on Grease: You're the One that I Want. The production closed on January 4, 2009.

=== Regional work ===
Spencer played the role of Éponine in Les Misérables at the Pittsburgh Civic Light Opera which ran from July 7–19, 2009.

She reprised her role of Amber in the 2009 Summer production of Hairspray at The St. Louis Muny.

She returned to Pittsburgh CLO in 2010 to play the role of Niki Harris in Curtains from June 22–27, 2010. Spencer then played the role of Ulla in their production of The Producers, as well as at Paper Mill Playhouse, and then reprised her role as Amber in their production of Hairspray.

In 2014, Spencer returned to CLO for their production of Singin' in the Rain where she played the role of Lina Lamont.

From November 7, 2017, to January 14, 2018, Spencer held the role of Polly Baker in Crazy for You at Signature Theatre (Arlington, Virginia).

=== Priscilla, Queen of the Desert ===
Spencer played one of the Divas in the Broadway production of Priscilla, Queen of the Desert, which opened in March 2011 at the Palace Theatre. The show also had a pre-Broadway tryout beginning October 12, 2010, at the Princess of Wales Theatre in Toronto.

=== Rock of Ages ===
She took over the role of Sherrie in the Broadway production of Rock of Ages from Emily Padgett on May 10, 2012, and was succeeded by fellow "You're The One That I Want" contestant, Kate Rockwell, in January 2013.

== Personal life ==
She married fellow theatre actor Jeremy Jordan on September 8, 2012. They have a daughter together, Clara Eloise Jordan, born April 21, 2019.
