= Laura Osnes =

American actress (born 1985)

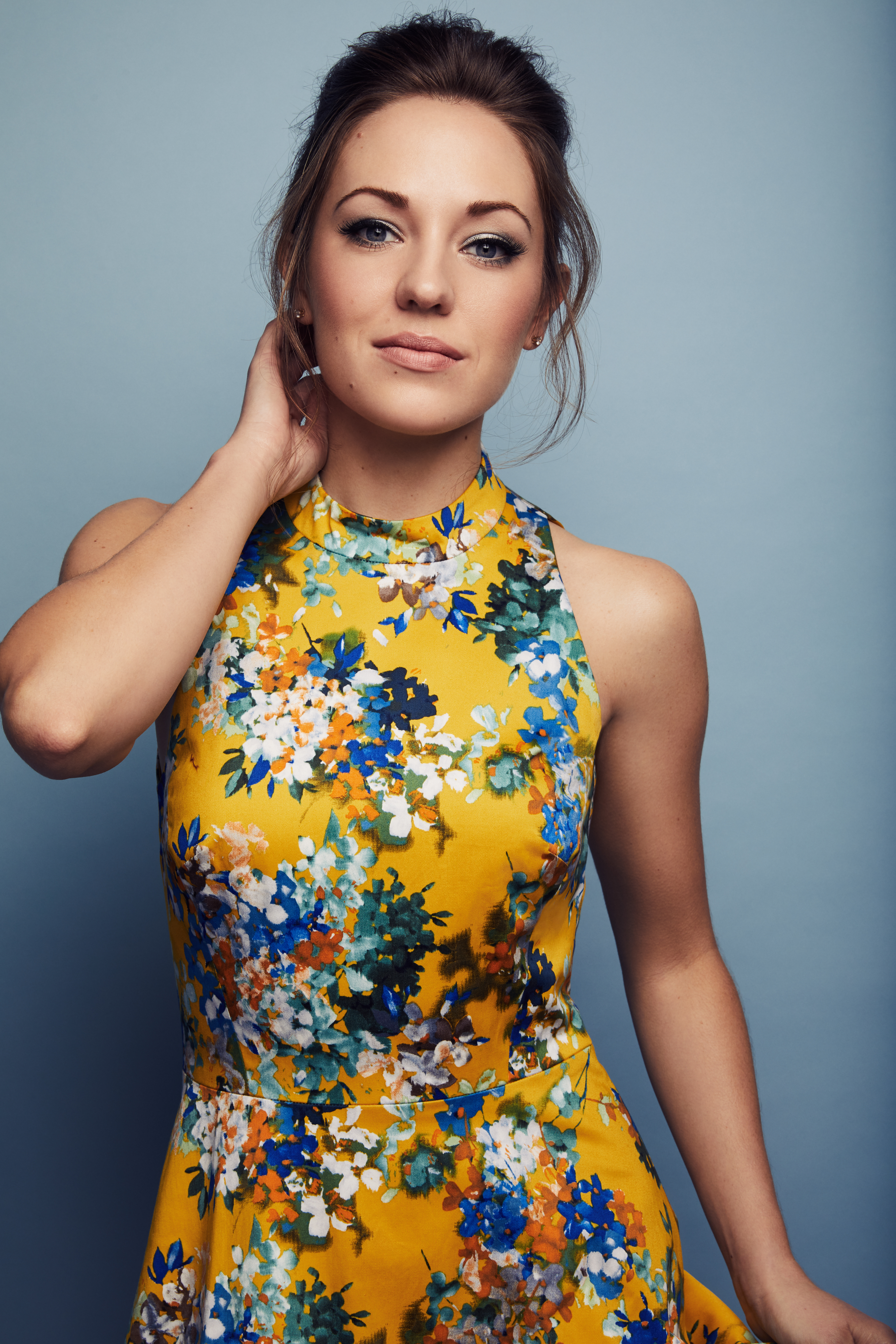
- Osnes in 2017
- Born: Laura Ann Osnes; November 19, 1985 (age 40); Burnsville, Minnesota, U.S.
- Education: University of Wisconsin-Stevens Point
- Occupations: Actress; singer
- Years active: 2007–present
- Spouse: Nathan Johnson (m. 2007)

Laura Ann Osnes (born November 19, 1985) is an American actress and singer known for her work on the Broadway stage. She has played starring roles in Grease as Sandy, South Pacific as Nellie Forbush, Anything Goes as Hope Harcourt, and Bonnie and Clyde as Bonnie Parker, for which she received a Tony Award nomination for Best Actress in a Musical. She also starred in the title role of Rodgers & Hammerstein's Cinderella on Broadway, for which she received a Drama Desk Award and her second Tony Award nomination for Best Actress in a Musical. She left New York and her Broadway career in 2021, moving to Nashville.

== Early life ==
Osnes was born in Burnsville, Minnesota, raised in nearby Eagan, a suburb of Saint Paul, and is a Christian. Her first acting performance was in the second grade, where she played a munchkin in The Wizard of Oz. She attended Eagan High School. Osnes attended the University of Wisconsin–Stevens Point for one year as a Musical Theatre major, before dropping out to pursue a professional career.

== Early career ==
In 2005–2006 she returned to Minneapolis to be a performing apprentice at the Children's Theatre Company, performing in Working, Aladdin Jr., Prom, and Pippi Longstocking. She also played the lead of Sandy in Grease at the nation's largest dinner theatre, the Chanhassen Dinner Theatres, but her run was cut short when she was chosen to compete in the nationally televised Broadway talent competition Grease: You're the One that I Want!.

In 2015, Osnes was a judge and mentor for the Songbook Academy, a summer intensive for high school students operated by the Great American Songbook Foundation and founded by Michael Feinstein.

== Career ==
=== Grease: You're the One that I Want! ===
Laura Osnes was nicknamed "Small Town Sandy" in the show. She was a favorite to win during the entire course of the show, never showing up in the "sing-off" bottom two during the show's run. She was named the winner on March 25, 2007, which meant she would perform the lead character of Sandy opposite Max Crumm, who won the role of "Danny".

Osnes and Crumm played their final performances as Sandy and Danny on July 20, 2008, and they were succeeded by Ashley Spencer and Derek Keeling, two of the runners-up of Grease: You're the One that I Want!.

=== Post-Grease ===
Osnes starred in the Kennedy Center for the Performing Arts' Broadway: Three Generations, a three-act evening featuring condensed versions of Girl Crazy, Bye Bye Birdie, and Side Show. The show was presented at the Kennedy Center's Eisenhower Theater October 2–5, 2008. She then played Elizabeth (Lizzy) Bennet for the concert version of the new Broadway-aimed musical Pride & Prejudice that was presented October 21, 2008, at the Eastman Theatre in Rochester, New York. In early December Osnes returned home to Minneapolis and performed in a local Christmas pageant. On January 11, 2009, she took part in the Rock Tenor Showcase, a showcase of a new concert experience that melds classical and Broadway music with rock-n-roll songs, at the Florence Gould Hall in Manhattan, and then sang at Dreamlight Theatre Company's "Bright Lights" concert series on the evening of January 26 entitled A Night with The Ladies.

=== Stage career ===
In March 2009, Osnes took over the role of Ensign Nellie Forbush in the Lincoln Center Theater Broadway revival of South Pacific. She stayed with the show through October 4, 2009, when the production's original star, Kelli O'Hara, returned from maternity leave. She then starred as Bonnie Parker in the world premiere of Bonnie & Clyde at the La Jolla Playhouse from November 10 to December 20, 2009. Osnes returned to the role of Nellie in South Pacific on Broadway on January 5, 2010. She played her final performance on August 8, 2010. She reprised the role of Bonnie in Bonnie & Clyde at the Asolo Repertory Theatre, Sarasota, Florida, in November and December 2010.

Osnes then played Hope Harcourt in the Broadway revival of Anything Goes, which began previews on March 10, 2011, and officially opened on April 7, 2011, starring Sutton Foster and Joel Grey. For this role Osnes received nominations for the Outer Critics Circle Award for Outstanding Featured Actress in a Musical as well as the Drama Desk Award for Outstanding Featured Actress in a Musical. She was also nominated for an Astaire Award for excellence in dance. Osnes departed the production on September 11, 2011.

Beginning previews on November 4, 2011, with a December 1 opening night, Osnes once again played Bonnie, this time in the Broadway debut of Bonnie and Clyde at the Gerald Schoenfeld Theatre. She was joined by her Asolo Rep castmate Jeremy Jordan as Clyde. The show received negative reviews, had lackluster ticket sales and closed on December 30, 2011. However, despite the critics' distaste for the production, Osnes received rave reviews for her performance as well as her first Tony Award nomination for Best Leading Actress in a Musical.

Osnes next performed at the 2011 Kennedy Center Honors in a tribute to Barbara Cook alongside Sutton Foster, Rebecca Luker, Kelli O'Hara, Patti LuPone, Glenn Close and Audra McDonald.

In January 2012, she played the title character in a reading of a reworked adaptation of the Rodgers and Hammerstein musical, Cinderella. She then led the Encores! stage concert production of Rodgers and Hammerstein's Pipe Dream, based on John Steinbeck's novel Sweet Thursday. Under the direction of Marc Bruni, the production ran from March 28 to April 1, 2012. On April 24, 2012, Osnes headlined a concert performance of The Sound of Music at Carnegie Hall (New York City) as Maria. Also featured were Tony Goldwyn as Captain von Trapp, Brooke Shields as Elsa Schraeder and Patrick Page as Max Detweiler.

Osnes starred in the title role of Cinderella on Broadway, which began previews at the Broadway Theatre on January 25 and opened on March 3, 2013. Osnes received positive reviews, won a 2013 Drama Desk award and was nominated for a Tony Award for her performance. She left the production on January 26, 2014, and was replaced by Carly Rae Jepsen.

Osnes starred as Polly Peachum in the Atlantic Theatre Company's Off-Broadway revival of The Threepenny Opera from March to May 2014. For this role, Osnes received her second nomination for the Drama Desk Award for Outstanding Featured Actress in a Musical. Osnes starred as Julie Jordan in the Lyric Opera of Chicago's production of Carousel, alongside Steven Pasquale, in spring 2015. The production closed on May 3, 2015. The production received positive reviews.

She took part in the world premiere of the new original musical, Bandstand, directed and choreographed by Andy Blankenbuehler, which premiered at the Paper Mill Playhouse, New Jersey from October 8 through November 8, 2015. The musical has music by Richard Oberacker and book and lyrics by Robert Taylor and Oberacker. Osnes most recently starred in the musical on Broadway at the Jacobs Theatre, with her co-star Corey Cott. It opened on April 26, 2017, with previews beginning March 31. The production closed on Broadway on September 17, 2017, after 24 previews and 166 regular performances.

Following the closing of Bandstand, Osnes has performed frequently in the Broadway Princess Party show that premiered at Feinstein's/54 Below, which she also hosts and co-developed with music director Benjamin Rauhala. The Princess Party has become a recurring live event at that venue that gathers both popular and up-and-coming stage actresses; at these performances, each actress assumes the identity of a Disney Princess and performs a song from stage or screen in character as that princess, with Osnes typically emceeing and performing as Cinderella. She also performed in this show on the road with fellow Broadway actresses Susan Egan (Beauty and the Beast, Hercules) and Courtney Reed (Aladdin).

In August 2021, Osnes exited a concert production of Crazy For You at the Guild Hall in East Hampton, NY after the producers mandated COVID-19 vaccinations for performers, though she denied the initial reports that said she was fired and said she chose to exit, defending her decision to not get vaccinated.

“In 2021 I faced some cancel culture with a tabloid news article in the paper,” said Osnes. “The community disowned me and deserted me, and we definitely felt a need for a change. We felt we had to get out. It wasn’t even safe for me to remain in New York anymore.”

Osnes began performing with Shiners, a musical circus in Nashville following her departure from New York City.

On February 27, 2026, Osnes performed at an event hosted by the National Endowment for the Humanities and Task Force 250 in the Indian Treaty Room of the Eisenhower Executive Office Building near the White House.

=== Television and film ===
In 2011, Osnes was cast in the pilot for HBO's The Miraculous Year, starring Lee Pace, Susan Sarandon, Patti LuPone, Eddie Redmayne and Norbert Leo Butz; the show was not picked up by the network. In 2013, she voiced a guest spot for the Nickelodeon children's show Team Umizoomi as "Sunny the Sunshine Fairy." In 2013 she appeared in an episode of the CBS television series Elementary.

In 2015, she was the guest artist for the annual Pioneer Day Concert of the Tabernacle Choir at Temple Square, Music for a Summer Evening, broadcast on BYUtv. She also performed with the Tabernacle Choir, the Orchestra at Temple Square, and the Bells on Temple Square for the annual Christmas Concerts of the Tabernacle Choir in December (2015), broadcast on PBS. On July 4, 2017, she performed in PBS's A Capitol Fourth, which was broadcast live from the west lawn of the U.S. Capitol.

Osnes starred in the Hallmark Channel film In the Key of Love, starring alongside Scott Michael Foster, as Maggie Case. The movie was released on the network on August 11, 2019. She also starred as Charlotte in Hallmark Movies & Mysteries' A Homecoming for the Holidays and as Anna in Hallmark Channel's One Royal Holiday alongside Aaron Tveit and Victoria Clark. Osnes has gone on to star in several more Hallmark Channel and Great American Family made-for-television films.

=== Songwriting ===
In October 2022, Osnes released original music for the first time on an extended play (EP) titled On the Other Side, Part 1. The EP includes five songs that Osnes co-wrote. She has since released several more songs individually and a music video for the song "Getaway".

== Filmography ==
=== Film ===
Year	Title	Role	Notes
2018	Bandstand: The Broadway Musical on Screen	Julia Trojan	Professional musical recording, aired in theaters
2020	Between the Black	Lucy	Short film

=== Television ===
Year	Title	Role	Notes
2012–2013	City of Dreams	Laura Osnes	Web series; 2 episodes
2013	Late Show with David Letterman	Herself	Performer; season 20, episode 125
2013	Live! with Kelly and Michael	Herself	Performer; season 25, episode 230
2013	Minute Motivations		Episode: "Holiday Special"
2013	Team Umizoomi	Sunny the Sunshine Fairy (Voice)	Episode: "The Sunshine Fairy"
2013	Elementary	Celia Carroll	Episode: "We Are Everyone"
2013	Six by Sondheim	Beth	HBO television documentary
2017	A Capitol Fourth	Herself	Performer
2018	The Marvelous Mrs. Maisel	Lizzie	Episode: "Midnight at the Concord"
2019	A Capitol Fourth	Herself	Performer
2019	Fosse/Verdon	Shirley MacLaine	Episode: "Life Is a Cabaret"
2019	In the Key of Love	Maggie Case	Hallmark Channel Television Film
2019	A Homecoming for the Holidays	Charlotte Quinn	Hallmark Channel Television Film
2020	Dynasty	Donna	Episode: "You Make Being a Priest Sound Like Something Bad"
2020	A Killer Party	Vivika Orsonwelles	7 episodes; also associate producer
2020	One Royal Holiday	Anna Jordan	Hallmark Channel Television Film
2021	A Capitol Fourth	Herself	Performer
2021	Raise a Glass to Love	Jenna	Hallmark Channel Television Film
2021	Christmas in Tahoe	Claire Rhodes	Hallmark Channel Television Film
2023–2024	Chip Chilla	Chinny Chilla	First animated kids' series from The Daily Wire
2023	A Dash of Christmas	Megan Blake	Great American Family Television Film
2024	Just in Time	Hannah	Great American Family Television Film
2024	A Little Women's Christmas	Beth March	Great American Family Television Film
2026	National Memorial Day Concert	Herself	Performer
2026	Silver Bells at Christmas	Ginny Nolan	Great American Family Television Film

=== Online videography ===
Year	Title	Role	Notes
2013	The Princess Diary	Herself	Broadway.com video blog
2017	With the Band	Herself	Broadway.com video blog

== Theatre credits ==
Year	Title	Role	Theatre	Notes
2007–08	Grease	Sandy	Brooks Atkinson Theatre	Broadway
2008	Pride and Prejudice	Elizabeth Bennett	Eastman Theatre	Rochester Concert
2008–09	South Pacific	Nellie Forbush	Vivian Beaumont Theater	Broadway
2009	Bonnie and Clyde	Bonnie Parker	La Jolla Playhouse	Regional
2010	Bonnie and Clyde	Bonnie Parker	Asolo Repertory Theatre	Regional
2011	Anything Goes	Hope Harcourt	Stephen Sondheim Theatre	Broadway
2011	Bonnie and Clyde	Bonnie Parker	Gerald Schoenfeld Theatre	Broadway
2012	The Sound of Music	Maria Von Trapp	Carnegie Hall	New York Concert
2012	Pipe Dream	Suzy	Encores!	New York Concert
2013–14	Rodgers and Hammerstein's Cinderella	Cinderella	Broadway Theatre	Broadway
2014	Threepenny Opera	Polly Peachum	Atlantic Theater Company	Off-Broadway
2014	Randy Newman's Faust	Margaret	Encores!	New York Concert
2014	The Band Wagon	Gabriella	Encores!	New York Concert
2014	Death Note: The Musical	Sayu Yagami	English concept album	
2015	Carousel	Julie Jordan	Civic Opera House	Regional
2015	The Bandstand	Julia Trojan	Paper Mill Playhouse	Out-of-town tryout
2017	Crazy For You	Polly Baker	David Geffen Hall	New York Concert
2017	Bandstand	Julia Trojan	Bernard B. Jacobs Theatre	Broadway
2018	On The Town	Claire DeLoone	Symphony Hall	Boston Concert
2018	Show Boat	Magnolia Hawkes	Bucks County Playhouse	Philadelphia Concert
2019	The Scarlet Pimpernel	Marguerite St. Just	David Geffen Hall	New York Concert
2022-23	Shiners	Violet	Woolworth Theater	Nashville comedy, music, and cirque act show

== Discography ==
Cast recordings
Year	Title	Music & Lyrics	Role
2007	Grease	Jim Jacobs and Warren Casey	Sandy Dumbrowski
2010	Pride and Prejudice (Demo)	Amanda Jacobs, Lindsay Warren Baker	Elizabeth Bennet
2011	Bonnie & Clyde (Demo)	Lyrics by Don Black, Music by Frank Wildhorn	Bonnie Parker
2011	Anything Goes	Cole Porter	Hope Harcourt
2012	Bonnie & Clyde	Lyrics by Don Black, Music by Frank Wildhorn	Bonnie Parker
2012	Encores! Pipe Dream (Live Recording)	Music by Richard Rodgers, Lyrics by Oscar Hammerstein II	Suzy
2013	Rodgers & Hammerstein's Cinderella	Music by Richard Rodgers, Lyrics by Oscar Hammerstein II	Ella
2014	Death Note: The Musical	Lyrics by Jack Murphy, Music by Frank Wildhorn	Sayu Yagami
2017	Bandstand	Music by Richard Oberacker, Lyrics by Richard Oberacker and Robert Taylor	Julia Trojan

Collaborations
Year	Title	Main Artist	Contribution
2007	Carols for a Cure, Vol. 7	Holiday songs; sold to benefit BC/EFA	"Jolly Old St. Nicholas/Up on the Housetop" with Grease cast
2009	Untitled (Demo)	Kait Kerrigan, Bree Lowdermilk	"How to Return Home"
2010	What I Wanna Be When I Grow Up	Scott Alan	"Easy"
2011	Our First Mistake	Kait Kerrigan, Bree Lowdermilk	"My Heart is Split" with Meghann Fahy
2012	Scott Alan: Live	Scott Alan	"Now"
2013	K-L Live	Kait Kerrigan, Bree Lowdermilk	"The Girl Who Drove Away"
2013	Carols for a Cure, Vol. 15	Holiday songs; sold to benefit BC/EFA	"Happy Christmas, Little Friend" with Santino Fontana & Ann Harada
2014	Songs of Daniel and Laura Curtis	Daniel and Laura Curtis	"When You Smile"
2014	Where the Sky Ends: The Songs of Michael Mott	Michael Mott	"Dare to Dream"
2016	Hallelujah!	Mormon Tabernacle Choir	"Oh, Come, All Ye Faithful", "Do You Hear What I Hear?", "The Secret of Christmas", "Christmas Bell Fantasy", "Angels from the Realms of Glory"
2022	Magic: Disney Through Time	BYU Vocal Point	"I See The Light"

Solo Albums
Year	Title	Notes
2012	Dream a Little Dream: Live at the Cafe Carlyle	Featuring Jeremy Jordan, Tom Wopat and husband Nathan Johnson
2013	If I Tell You (Songs of Maury Yeston)	Based on Osnes' 2012 Maury Yeston concert at 54 Below
2022	On the Other Side, Part 1	Extended Play (EP) Digital Download
2026	Let Your Heart Be Light	Christmas album; Extended Play (EP) Digital Download

== Awards and nominations ==
Year	Award Ceremony	Category	Production	Result
2003	Star Tribune Theatre Award	Outstanding Youth Performer of the Year	The Wizard of Oz	Won
2009	San Diego Theatre Critics Circle	Lead Performance in a Musical	Bonnie & Clyde	Won
2009	Broadway.com Audience Award	Favorite Replacement	South Pacific	Won
2011	Drama Desk Award	Outstanding Featured Actress in a Musical	Anything Goes	Nominated
2011	Outer Critics Circle Award	Outstanding Featured Actress in a Musical	Anything Goes	Nominated
2011	Astaire Award	Excellence in Dance	Anything Goes	Nominated
2012	Tony Award	Best Lead Actress in a Musical	Bonnie & Clyde	Nominated
2012	Broadway.com Audience Award	Favorite Lead Actress in a Musical	Bonnie & Clyde	Won
2012	Broadway.com Audience Award	Favorite Onstage Pair (with co-star Jeremy Jordan)	Bonnie & Clyde	Nominated
2013	Tony Award	Best Lead Actress in a Musical	Rodgers & Hammerstein's Cinderella	Nominated
2013	Outer Critics Circle Award	Best Lead Actress in a Musical	Rodgers & Hammerstein's Cinderella	Nominated
2013	Drama Desk Award	Best Lead Actress in a Musical	Rodgers & Hammerstein's Cinderella	Won
2013	Drama League Award	Distinguished Performance	Rodgers & Hammerstein's Cinderella	Nominated
2013	Astaire Award	Excellence in Dance	Rodgers & Hammerstein's Cinderella	Nominated
2013	Broadway.com Audience Award	Favorite Lead Actress in a Musical	Rodgers & Hammerstein's Cinderella	Won
2013	Broadway.com Audience Award	Favorite Onstage Pair (with co-star Santino Fontana)	Rodgers & Hammerstein's Cinderella	Won
2014	Drama Desk Award	Outstanding Featured Actress in a Musical	The Threepenny Opera	Nominated
2017	Drama Desk Award	Outstanding Actress in a Musical	Bandstand	Nominated
2017	Drama League Award	Distinguished Performance	Bandstand	Nominated
2017	Broadway.com Audience Award	Favorite Leading Actress in a Musical	Bandstand	Nominated
2017	Broadway.com Audience Award	Favorite Diva Performance	Bandstand	Nominated
2017	Broadway.com Audience Award	Favorite Onstage Pair (with co-star Corey Cott)	Bandstand	Nominated

== Personal life ==
Nathan Johnson proposed to Osnes on December 23, 2006. They were married on May 11, 2007. They lived in Manhattan with their dog, Lyla, for over a decade once Laura started her Broadway career. Since October 2021, the couple has resided in Nashville.
