= Jeffrey Finn =

American theatrical producer

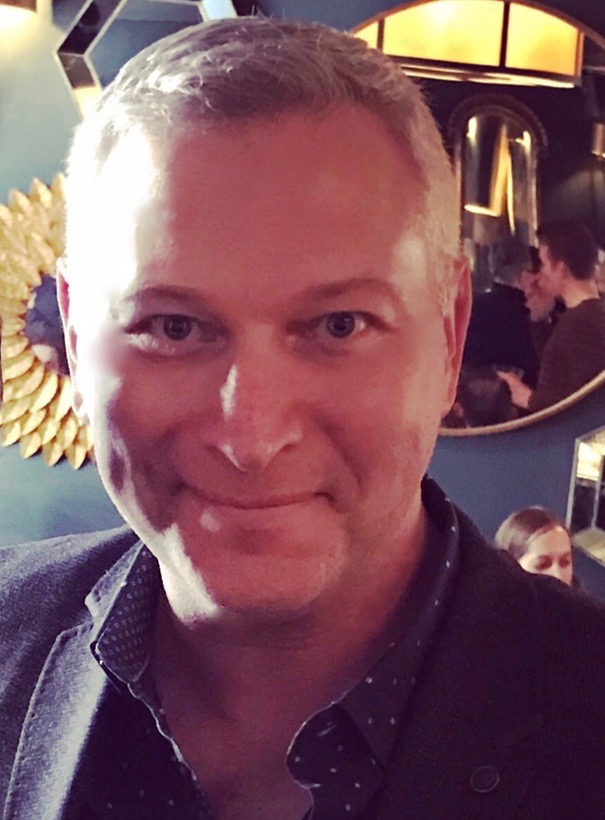
- Born: June 3, 1970 (age 56); Boston, Massachusetts, U.S.
- Education: Connecticut College (BA)
- Occupations: Broadway/Theater Producer

Jeffrey Finn is a three-time Tony Award-winning American theatrical producer. From 2016 until his resignation in September 2025, he served as Senior Vice President of Artistic Programming and as Vice President/Executive Producer of Theater at The John F. Kennedy Center for the Performing Arts, where he founded and oversaw and the Broadway Center Stage. His departure was among a series of senior-staff resignations at the Kennedy Center following President Donald Trump's assumption of its board chairmanship in 2025. He received the Commercial Theater Institute's 2013 Robert Whitehead Award for outstanding achievement in commercial theatre producing. Finn is the President of Jeffrey Finn Productions and Hot On Broadway. He attended Connecticut College, where he received his bachelor's degree in 1992. He attended Beaver Country Day School from 1984 to 1988. He is a member of the executive committee and Board of Governors of The Broadway League and is a part of The Independent Presenters Network.

== Broadway ==
- Schmigadoon, a new musical based on the Emmy-Award winning Apple TV series. The production won four Tony Awards, including the 2026 Tony Award for Best Musical.
- Smash, a new musical based on the hit NBC series about the production of a new Broadway musical.
- The Outsiders, a musical based on the 1967 novel by S.E Hinton. The production won four Tony Awards, including the 2024 Tony Award for Best Musical.
- Spamalot, the 2005 musical lovingly ripped off from the motion picture, Monty Python and the Holy Grail. Spamalot is the first musical from the popular Broadway Center Stage series to transfer from the Kennedy Center to Broadway, opening on November 16, 2023, at the St. James Theatre to rave reviews, including a New York Times' Critics Pick. The revival was nominated for 2024 Outer Critics Circle Award for Best Revival of a Musical, as well as a nomination for a Drama League Award for Best Revival of a Musical.
- Macbeth, a classic Shakespeare tragedy starring Daniel Craig and Ruth Negga. Macbeth opened on April 28, 2022, and ran on Broadway at the Longacre Theatre until July 10, 2022, for a total of 79 performance. Amber Grey and Asia Kate Dillon also starred. The production was directed by Sam Gold.
- Company, a 1970 musical comedy with music and lyrics by Stephen Sondheim and book by George Furth. The Broadway transfer of the 2018 West End revival was scheduled to open at the Bernard B. Jacobs Theatre on March 22, 2020, with previews beginning on March 2. The production starred Patti LuPone as Joanne, and Katrina Lenk as Bobbie. The production also featured Jennifer Simard, Matt Doyle, Christopher Fitzgerald, Nikki Renee Daniels, and Christopher Sieber, with direction by Marianne Elliott. The production featured choreography by Liam Steel, music supervision and direction by Joel Fram, scenic and costume designs by Bunny Christie, lighting design by Neil Austin, sound design by Ian Dickinson (for Autograph Sound), and illusions by Chris Fisher. After COVID-related delays, the musical officially opened on Broadway December 9, 2021 and ran for 265 performances before closing on July 10, 2022. The revival was nominated for nine Tony awards, winning Best Revival of a Musical, Best Performance by a Featured Actress for Patti Lupone, best Performance for a Featured Actor for Matt Doyle, Best Direction of a Musical for Marianne Elliott, and Best Scenic Design of a Musical for Bunny Christie.
- Plaza Suite, a comedy play by Neil Simon. The revival played at the Hudson Theatre beginning in previews on February 25, 2022, and officially opened on March 28, 2022, following a brief pre-Broadway run at the Emerson Colonial Theatre in Boston in February 2020, two years prior to its opening. The production starred Matthew Broderick and Sarah Jessica Parker and was directed by John Benjamin Hickey. The production ran for 110 performances and closed on July 10, 2022.
- Ain't Too Proud, book by Dominique Morisseau, music and lyrics by The Temptations. It is directed by two-time Tony Award winner Des McAnuff and choreographed by Olivier Award winner Sergio Trujillo. The production opened at the Imperial Theatre on March 21, 2019. On April 30, 2019, Ain't Too Proud was nominated for 12 Tony Awards, including Best Musical.
- Sunday in the Park with George, starring Jake Gyllenhaal. Written by Stephen Sondheim, the production opened at the Hudson Theatre on February 23, 2017.
- Hughie, starring Forest Whitaker. Written by Eugene O'Neill, the production began previews at the Booth Theatre on February 8, 2016. The director is Michael Grandage.
- An Act Of God, starring Jim Parsons. Written by David Javerbaum, the production played Studio 54. The director was Joe Mantello. May 7, 2015 - August 2, 2015. A six-week engagement of the play starring Sean Hayes played at the CTG/Ahmanson Theatre in Los Angeles on January 30, 2016. The production starring Sean Hayes then played a three-week engagement at the SHN/Golden Gate Theatre in San Francisco from March 29, 2016 - April 17, 2016.
- The Elephant Man, starring Bradley Cooper, Patricia Clarkson, and Alessandro Nivola. Written by Bernard Pomerance, the production played the Booth Theatre. The director was Scott Ellis. November 7, 2014 - February 21, 2015. It moved afterwards to London, where the production played the Haymarket Theatre. The director was Scott Ellis.
- The Realistic Joneses, starring Toni Collette, Michael C. Hall, Tracy Letts, and Marisa Tomei. Written by Will Eno, the production played the Lyceum Theatre. The director was Sam Gold. March 13, 2014 - July 6, 2014.
- I'll Eat You Last: A Chat With Sue Mengers, starring Bette Midler. Written by John Logan, the production played the Booth Theatre. The director was Joe Mantello. April 24, 2013 - June 30, 2013.
- Dead Accounts, starring Katie Holmes, Norbert Leo Butz, Judy Greer, Josh Hamilton and Jayne Houdyshell. Written by Theresa Rebeck, the production played at the Music Box Theatre. The director was Jack O'Brien. November 29, 2012 - January 6, 2013.
- Scandalous: The Life and Trials of Aimee Semple McPherson, starring Carolee Carmello. Book and lyrics by Kathie Lee Gifford, music by David Friedman and David Pomeranz, the production played at the Neil Simon Theatre. The director was David Armstrong. November 15, 2012 - December 6, 2012.
- Seminar, starring Alan Rickman, Lily Rabe, Hamish Linklater, Jerry O'Connell and Hettienne Park. Written by Theresa Rebeck, the production played at the Golden Theatre. The director was Sam Gold. November 20, 2011 - May 6, 2012.
- American Idiot, starring John Gallagher Jr., Tony Vincent and Stark Sands. Book by Billie Joe Armstrong and Michael Mayer, lyrics by Billie Joe Armstrong and music by Green Day, the production played at the St. James Theatre. The director was Michael Mayer. April 20, 2010 - April 24, 2011.
- A View from the Bridge, starring Scarlett Johansson and Liev Schreiber. Written by Arthur Miller, the production played at the Cort Theatre. The director was Gregory Mosher. January 24, 2010 - April 4, 2010.
- Oleanna, starring Julia Stiles and Bill Pullman. Written by David Mamet, the production played at the John Golden Theatre. The director was Doug Hughes. October 11, 2009 - December 6, 2009.
- Blithe Spirit, starring Rupert Everett, Christine Ebersole, Jayne Atkinson and Angela Lansbury. Written by Noël Coward, the production played at the Shubert Theatre. The director was Michael Blakemore. March 15, 2009 - July 19, 2009.
- On Golden Pond, starring Leslie Uggams and James Earl Jones. Written by Ernest Thompson, the production played at the Cort Theatre. The director was Leonard Foglia. April 7, 2005 - June 26, 2005.

== The Kennedy Center ==
As the Vice President and Executive Producer of Theater at The Kennedy Center, Finn oversees all of the presented Broadway tours and Kennedy Center produced theater shows. In the 2017/18 season he launched Broadway Center Stage, a series of semi-staged musicals featuring talent and creative teams direct from Broadway. For the 2022/23 season, he further developed the series by turning the shows into fully-realized productions.

=== Broadway Center Stage productions ===
2024 - 2025 season

- The 25th Annual Putnam County Spelling Bee, by William Finn and Rachel Sheinkin. Directed and choreographed by Danny Mefford, with musical direction by Roberto Sinha. Starring Phillipe Arroyo, Leana Rae Concepcion, Beanie Feldstein, Noah Galvin, Alex Joseph Grayson, Taran Killam, Kevin McHale, Bonnie Milligan and Nina White. The show ran for 11 exclusive performances October 11-October 20, 2024 in the Eisenhower Theater. Due to the audience participation aspect of the show, the Broadway Center Stage production invited celebrity guest spellers to individual performances, including Cobie Smulders, Carla Hall, Ari Shapiro, Dana Bash, Karine Jean-Pierre, D'Arcy Carden, Peter Marks, David Challian, Jose Ilana, Sarah Saltzberg, Jesse Tyler Ferguson, and Ben Platt.
- Schmigadoon! by Cinco Paul. The first Broadway Center Stage world-premiere based on the Apple TV show, Schmigadoon! Directed and choreographed by Christopher Gatelli with music direction by Steven Malone. Starring Alex Brightman, Sara Chase, Kevin Del Aguila, Ann Harada, McKenzie Kurtz, Isabelle McCalla, Javier Munoz, Brad Oscar, Emily Skinner, and Ryan Vasquez. The production ran January 31, 2025 – February 9, 2025 in the Eisenhower Theater.

2023 - 2024 season

- tick, tick...BOOM! by Jonathan Larson. Directed by Neil Patrick Harris and choreographed by Paul McGill, with music direction by Ben Cohn. Starring Brandon Uranowitz as Jon, Denee Benton as Susan/Karessa and Grey Henson as Michael. The Broadway Center Stage production featured new orchestrations and vocal arrangements by Stephen Oremus, which expanded the show and added four additional ensemble members. The show was critically acclaimed and ran for 11 exclusive performances January 26–February 4, 2024 in the Eisenhower Theater.
- Bye Bye Birdie, by Charles Strouse and Lee Adams. Directed by Marc Bruni and choreographed by Denis Jones. Starring Christian Borle, Krysta Rodriguez and Ephraim Sykes. The production ran June 7-June 15, 2024 in the Eisenhower Theater.
- Nine, by Maury Yeston and Arthur Kopit. Directed and choreographed by Tony-winning Andy Blankenbuehler and starring Steven Pasquale, Shereen Ahmed, Carolee Carmello, Elizabeth Stanley, Lesli Margherita, and Mary Elizabeth Mastrantonio. The production ran August 2-August 11, 2024 in the Eisenhower Theater.

2022 - 2023 season

- Guys & Dolls, by Frank Loesser, book by Jo Swerling and Abe Burrows. Starring Tony Award winner James Monroe Iglehart as Nathan Detroit, Tony Award winner Jessie Mueller as Adelaide, Tony Award nominee Phillipa Soo as Sarah Brown, Steven Pasquale as Skye Masterson. Also featuring Kevin Chamberlin as Nicely Nicely Johnson and Rachel Dratch as Big Julie. Directed by Marc Bruni and choreographed by Denis Jones. The show was critically acclaimed and ran for 10 exclusive performances October 7–16, 2022 in the Eisenhower Theater. The show was declared as a critic's pick #1 Best of Theatre by The Washington Post in 2022.
- Sunset Boulevard, by Andrew Lloyd Webber, with lyrics and book by Don Black and Christopher Hampton. Starring Stephanie J. Block as Norma Desmond, Derek Klena as Joe Gillis, Auli'i Cravalho as Betty Schaefer and Nathan Gunn as Max Von Meyerling. Direction by Sammi Cannold. Running February 1–8, 2023 in the Eisenhower Theater.
- Spamalot, by John Du Prez and Eric Idle. Starring James Monroe Iglehart, Leslie Kritzer, Rob McClure, Michael Urie and Alex Brightman. Direction and Choreography by Josh Rhodes, with Music Direction by John Bell. The show ran for 11 performances, May 12–21 in the Eisenhower Theater. It was the first Broadway Center Stage production to transfer to Broadway in just five months after premiering in Washington, D.C.

2019 - 2020 season

- Footloose written by Dean Pitchford and Walter Bobbie. Directed by Walter Bobbie, choreographed by Spencer Liff and musical direction by Sonny Paladino. Starring J. Quinton Johnson, Isabelle McCalla, Michael Park, Rebecca Luker, and Judy Kuhn.
- Next to Normal, the Pulitzer Prize winning show written by Brian Yorkey, starring Tony Award winner Rachel Bay Jones, Brandon Victor Dixon, Maia Reficco, Ben Levi Ross, and Michael Park. Directed by Michael Greif, choreographed by Sergio Trujillo and musical direction by Charlie Alterman.

2018 - 2019 season

- Little Shop Of Horrors written by Alan Menken and Howard Ashman, starring Josh Radnor and Megan Hilty. Directed by Mark Brokaw and choreographed by Spencer Liff.
- The Music Man, starring Norm Lewis and Jessie Mueller, written by Meredith Willson. Directed by Marc Bruni and choreographed by Chris Bailey.
- The Who's Tommy written by Pete Townshend and Des McAnuff, starring Casey Cott, Tony Award winner Christian Borle, and Mandy Gonzalez. Directed and choreographed by Josh Rhodes.

2017 - 2018 season

- Chess, starring Raul Esparza, Karen Olivo, Ramin Karimloo and Ruthie Ann Miles, directed by Michael Mayer and featuring a new book by Danny Strong. Chess was written by Björn Ulvaeus, Benny Andersson and Tim Rice. February 14–18, 2018.
- In The Heights, starring Anthony Ramos, Vanessa Hudgens, Eden Espinosa and J. Quinton Johnson, directed and choreographed by Stephanie Klemons. In The Heights was written by Lin Manuel Miranda and Quiara Alegría Hudes. March 21–25, 2018.
- How To Succeed In Business Without Really Trying, starring Skylar Astin, Betsy Wolfe, Michael Urie and John Michael Higgins, directed by Marc Bruni and choreographed by Denis Jones. June 6–10, 2018.

=== Other Productions at The Kennedy Center ===
- JFK Centennial Celebration, starring Martin Sheen, CNN's Dana Bash, Renee Fleming and Brian Dennehy. The Memorial Day performance was directed by Gregory Mosher. May 29, 2017
- Bernstein on Broadway, starring Laura Osnes, Norm Lewis, Santino Fontana, and Beth Malone. The one-night concert celebration was directed and choreographed by Kathleen Marshall, with music direction by Rob Fisher. September 22, 2017.
- The 2019 Kennedy Center Gala with Idina Menzel, starring Tony Award winner Idina Menzel. The Kennedy Center Gala Celebrating the Human Spirit honored Forest Whitaker, Pat Ryan (executive) and Shirley W. Ryan and their distinguished guests. April 3, 2019.
- Byhalia, Mississippi, directed by Kimberly Senior, and written by Evan Linder. June 7, 2019 - July 7, 2019.
- Tiny Beautiful Things June 7, 2020 - July 7, 2020.
- 50 Years of Broadway at the Kennedy Center. Opera House, February 11–12, 2022. The production was hosted by James Monroe Iglehart and starred a who's who of Broadway names, including Stephanie J. Block, Alfie Boe, Sierra Boggess, Gavin Creel, LaChanze, Beth Leavel, Norm Lewis, Andrea McArdle, Andrew Rannells, Frances Ruffelle, Vanessa Williams, Betsy Wolfe and Tony Yazbeck.

== Other projects ==
Between 1994 and 1999, Finn produced a series of five new concerts titled Broadway Songbooks, which originated at Kennedy Center. These national tours starred Melba Moore, Carol Lawrence, Mimi Hines, Diahann Carroll, Marilyn McCoo, and Billy Davis, Jr. and celebrated the songbooks of Irving Berlin, Cole Porter, Rodgers and Hart, and Duke Ellington. Additional national and international tours produced by Jeffrey Finn Productions from 1999 to 2003 include The Who's Tommy, A Few Good Men...DANCIN', Leader of the Pack starring Mary Wilson, Promises, Promises, Company, and Chess.

Prior to his time working as the Vice President and Executive Producer of Theater, Finn produced many shows at the Kennedy Center, including Andrew Lloyd Webber's Tell Me on a Sunday starring Alice Ripley (2003), The Music of Andrew Lloyd Webber (2005, 2008) and a revival of the Pulitzer Prize-winning drama The Subject Was Roses starring Bill Pullman and Judith Ivey (2006).

By special arrangement with the Really Useful Group, Finn produced a revised version of The Music of Andrew Lloyd Webber at other locations including the Hummingbird Centre, The Bushnell Center for the Performing Arts and the Civic Center of Greater Des Moines in 2006.

In 2006, he also produced a national tour of On Golden Pond starring Tom Bosley and Michael Learned, which premiered at the Ordway Center for the Performing Arts.

Finn is co-author of Game Show, which he produced off-Broadway at the 45 Bleecker Theatre. It opened on October 25, 2000. A production at Harrah's Showboat Casino opened on July 6, 2002. The play was translated into French for a Canadian production outside Montreal, as well as a Toronto sit-down engagement.

Finn is also a co-producer of the Ain't Too Proud U.S. National Tour, as well as the London West End production. Ain't Too Proud opened in London on April 20, 2023.

== Corporate entertainment ==
In 1998, Jeffrey Finn Productions launched a Corporate Division entitled Hot On Broadway, which presents customized entertainment with stars from current Broadway productions for corporate clients. The client list includes General Motors, Bristol-Myers Squibb, Harrah's, Ritz-Carlton, Disney, H&R Block, MPI, Jack Morton, and Fidelity Investments.

== Awards and nominations ==
- 2026 Tony Award Winner for Best Musical for Schmigadoon!
- 2025 Helen Hayes Award nominee for Outstanding Musical - The 25th Annual Putnam County Spelling Bee
- 2025 Helen Hayes Award nominee for Outstanding Musical – Bye Bye Birdie
- 2024 Tony Award Winner for Best Musical for The Outsiders
- 2024 Helen Hayes Award nomination for Outstanding Production for Spamalot
- 2023 Helen Hayes Award for Outstanding Visiting Production for Guys & Dolls
- 2022 Tony Award Winner for Best Revival of a Musical for Company
- 2019 Tony Award nomination for Best Musical for Ain't Too Proud
- 2019 Drama League nomination for Outstanding Production of a Broadway or Off-Broadway Musical for Ain't Too Proud
- 2015 Tony Award nomination for Best Revival of a Play for The Elephant Man
- 2015 Drama Desk Award for Outstanding Revival of a Play for The Elephant Man
- 2015 Outer Critics Circle nomination for Outstanding Revival of a Broadway Play for The Elephant Man
- 2014 Outer Critics Circle nomination for Outstanding New Broadway Play for The Realistic Joneses
- 2014 Drama League nomination for Outstanding Production of a Broadway Play for The Realistic Joneses
- 2013 Robert Whitehead Award Winner for Excellence in Commercial Theatre Producing - Commercial Theatre Institute
- 2013 Outer Critics Circle nomination for Outstanding Production of a Play for I'll Eat You Last
- 2010 Tony Award nomination for Best Revival of a Play for A View From the Bridge
- 2010 Tony Award nomination for Best Musical for American Idiot
- 2010 Drama Desk nomination for Best Revival of a Play for A View From the Bridge
- 2010 Drama Desk nomination for Best Musical for American Idiot
- 2009 Drama Desk nomination for Best Revival of a Play for Blithe Spirit
- 2005 Tony Award nomination for Best Revival of a Play for On Golden Pond
