= List of theatre managers and producers =

This is a list of notable theatre managers and theatrical producers grouped alphabetically by country or area, then alphabetically by surname.

== Australia and New Zealand ==
- J. C. Williamson

== United Kingdom and Ireland ==
- Lilian Baylis
- Binkie Beaumont
- Alfred Bunn
- Matthew Churchill
- Giles Richard Cooper
- Richard D'Oyly Carte
- Rupert D'Oyly Carte
- George Dance
- George Edwardes
- Robert Evett
- Sonia Friedman
- David Garrick
- George Grossmith, Jr.
- Fred Karno
- Bill Kenwright
- Cameron Mackintosh
- Thomas German Reed
- Michael Scott
- Marc Sinden

== United States ==
=== A–M ===
- Doris Abrahams
- Catherine Adler
- David Belasco
- Roger Berlind
- David Binder
- Kermit Bloomgarden
- Mel Brooks
- Arthur Cantor
- Alexander H. Cohen
- Bonnie Comley
- Katharine Cornell
- Jean Dalrymple
- Ken Davenport
- A.L. Erlanger
- Jeffrey Finn
- Cy Feuer
- Justin Field
- Charles Frohman
- Daniel Frohman
- Gustave Frohman
- David Geffen
- Bernard Gersten
- Morris Gest
- Robert E. Griffith
- Oscar Hammerstein II
- Carole Shorenstein Hays
- Leland Hayward
- Elia Kazan
- John Kenley
- Sarah Kirby-Stark
- Marc Klaw
- Stewart F. Lane
- Cody Lassen
- Bruce Lazarus
- Mitch Leigh
- Margo Lion
- Christopher Massimine
- Elizabeth Ireland McCann
- Gilbert Miller
- Henry Miller
- David Merrick
- Oliver Morosco
- Stephen Moorer

=== N–Z ===
- James L. Nederlander
- James M. Nederlander
- Samuel F. Nixon
- Nelle Nugent
- Joseph Papp
- H. C. Potter
- Hal Prince
- Jeffrey Richards (producer)
- Richard Rodgers
- Philip Rose
- Daryl Roth
- Jordan Roth
- Irene Mayer Selznick
- Shubert brothers
- David Stone (producer)
- George D. Sweet
- Mike Todd
- Frederic B. Vogel
- Barry and Fran Weissler
- Barbara Whitman
- John C. Wilson
- A. H. Woods
- Florenz Ziegfeld
- J. Fred Zimmerman, Jr.

== See also ==
- List of theatre personnel
