= 5th Avenue Theatre =

Landmark theatre in Seattle, Washington

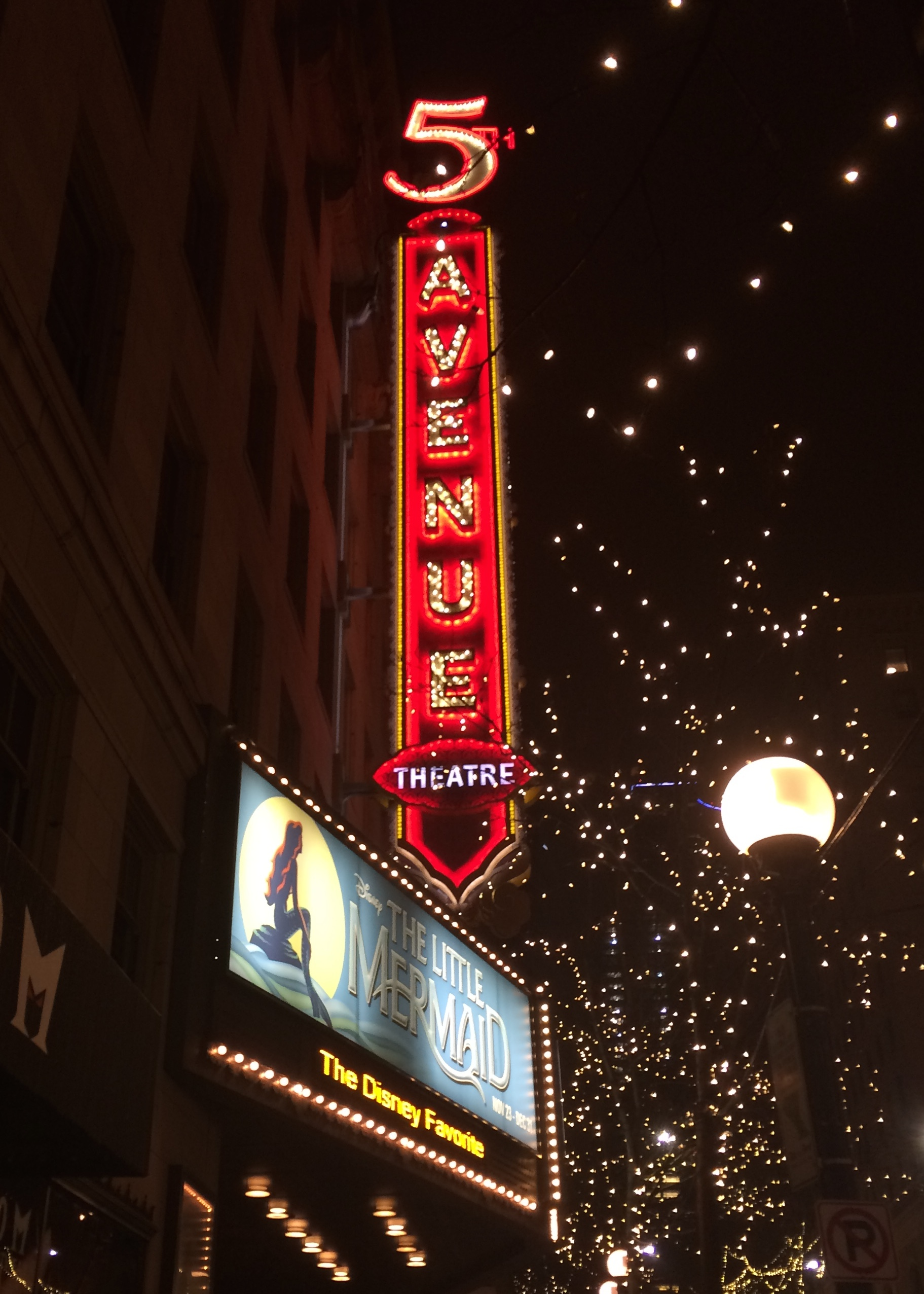
- 5th Avenue Theatre marquee, Holiday 2016
- Interactive map of 5th Avenue Theatre
- Address: 1308 5th Avenue; Seattle, Washington; 98101
- Coordinates: 47.6092°N 122.3340°W
- Owner: University of Washington
- Operator: 5th Avenue Theatre Association
- Capacity: 2,130

Construction
- Built: 1925
- Opened: September 24, 1926; 100 years ago
- Architect: R.C. Reamer

Website
- www.5thavenue.org
- Skinner Building / Fifth Avenue Theater
- U.S. National Register of Historic Places
- Location within Downtown Seattle Location within Washington (state)
- Area: 1 acre (0.40 ha)
- Architectural style: Late 19th and 20th century revivals, Italian Renaissance
- NRHP reference No.: 78002756
- Added to NRHP: November 28, 1978

The 5th Avenue Theatre is a landmark theatre located in the Skinner Building, in the downtown core of Seattle, Washington, United States. It has hosted a variety of theatre productions and motion pictures since it opened in 1926. The building and land are owned by the University of Washington and were once part of the original campus. The theatre operates as a venue for nationally touring Broadway and original shows by the non-profit 5th Avenue Theatre Association.

The 2,130-seat theatre is the resident home to the 5th Avenue Musical Theatre Company, and employs over 600 actors, musicians, directors, choreographers, designers, technicians, stage hands, box office staff, and administrators, making it the largest theatre employer in the Puget Sound region. A non-profit, the theatre company is supported by individual and corporate donations, government sources, and box office ticket sales.

The 5th's subscriber season programming includes six to seven shows per year, a mix of locally produced revivals of musical theatre classics, and premieres of bound-for-Broadway shows, and national touring musicals. The 5th Avenue Theatre has established a tradition of being a "testing ground" for new musicals before they make their debut on Broadway, launching hits such as Jekyll & Hyde, Hairspray, Aladdin, and The Wedding Singer. The theatre also hosts a variety of special events, and offers education and outreach programs to school-age children and adults reaching over 61,000 students, professional performers, and audiences each year.

== Architecture ==
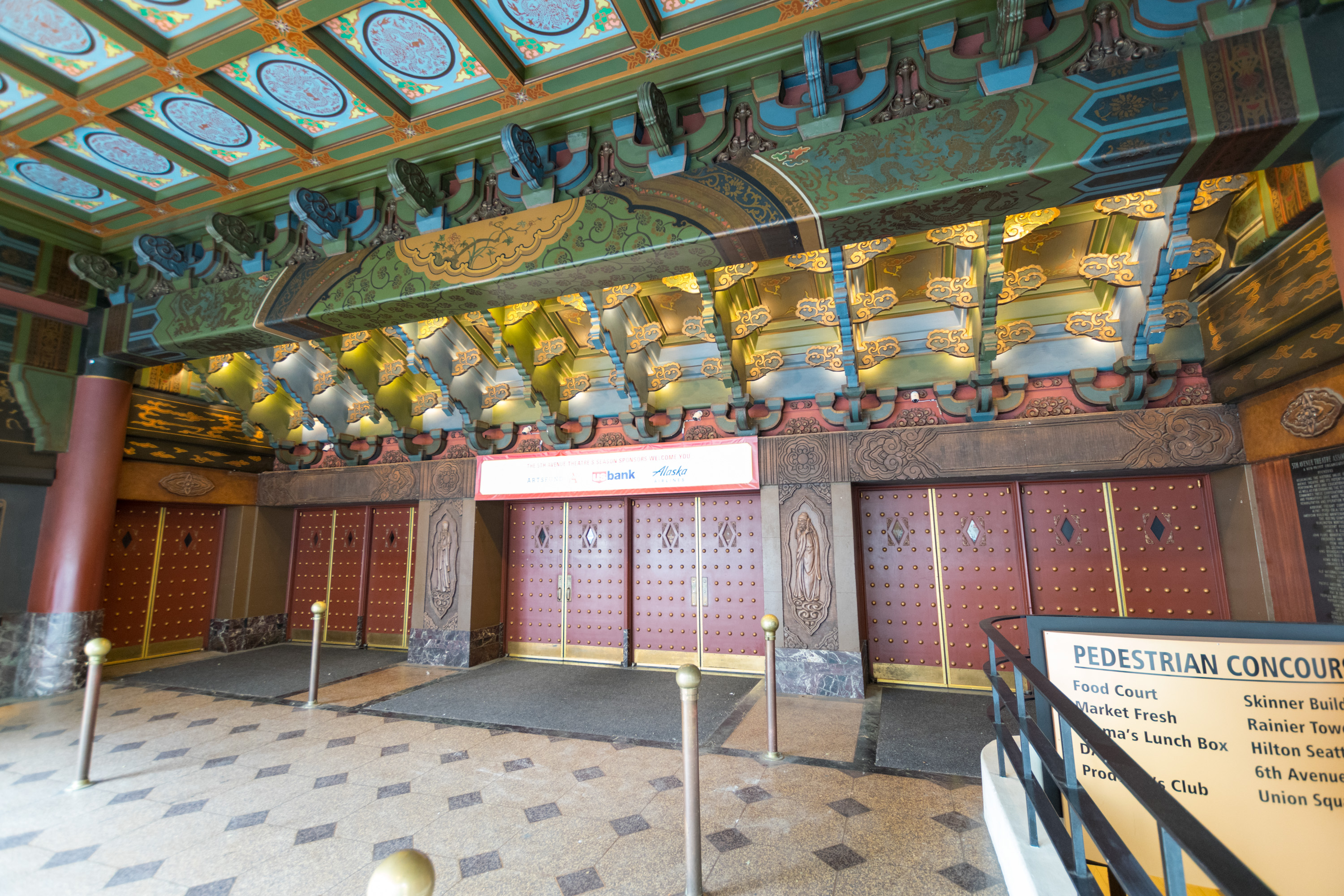
Entry to theatre with decorative brackets above

Located in the Skinner Building, a historic office block ranging from five to eight stories with retail shops on the ground level, the theatre is surrounded on three sides, with its entry facing its namesake avenue. In addition to an auditorium with an original seating capacity of 3,000, the theatre contains a grand entry hall, and a mezzanine that once featured a tea room in addition to a waiting room and women's lounge.

Robert C. Reamer's design for the 5th Avenue Theatre was modeled to reproduce some of the features of historic and well-known Beijing landmarks. The Norwegian artist Gustav Liljestrom executed the design based on his visit to China, and on Chinesische Architecktur, published in 1925, an illustrated account of German architect Ernst Boerschmann's travels in China.

The ornate historical Chinese style of the theatre distinguishes itself from the Neo-Renaissance exterior of the Skinner Building. Only at the street entry under the marquee does the viewer get a preview of the interior design. Here, adorning the ceiling are plaster representations of wood brackets, beams, and carved reliefs painted in a polychromatic scheme and decorated with stenciled dragons and flower patterns. Carved cloud shapes screen light fixtures to create an indirect lighting effect as the viewer approaches the wooden, brass knobbed entry doors. The original central free-standing box office was replaced by the current box office located to the side of the entry as part of a 1979 renovation. The original Imperial guardian lions (Ruì Shī), commonly called foo dogs or foo lions, originally located outside the entry were moved inside as part of the 1979 renovation.

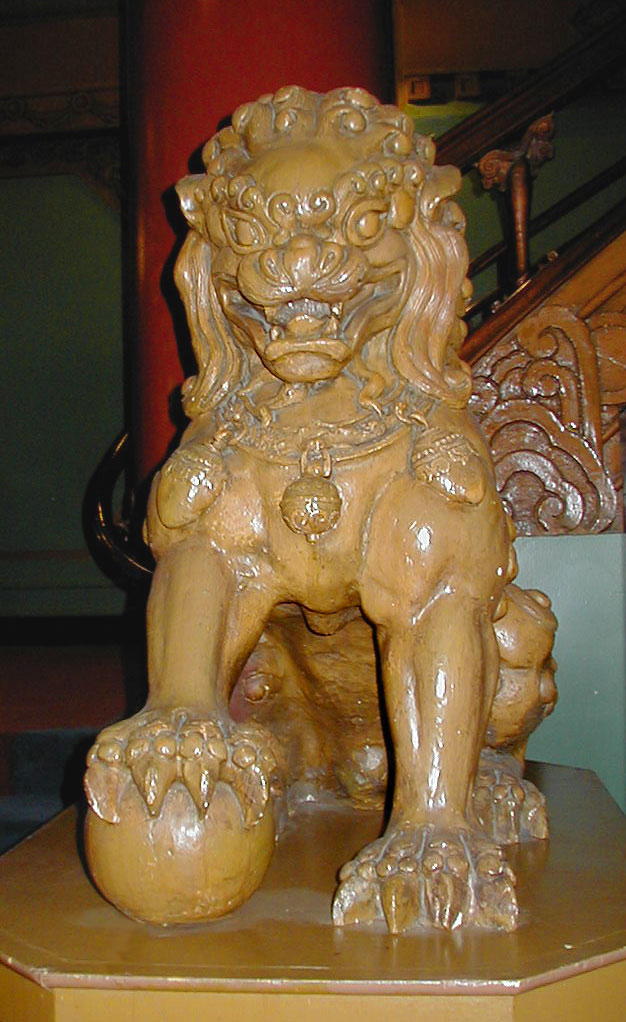
Male Imperial guardian lion

The interior architecture of the theatre is an "excellent imitation of Chinese wooden temple construction". The two story rectangular lobby features red, stenciled columns wrapped in plaster rising to a timbered roof structure of decoratively painted beams supporting a canopy of bamboo, also imitated in plaster. The original pair of guardian lions, both male, guard the stairway to a second level gallery that serves the theatre balcony. In addition to the Imperial guard lions, other original furnishings, light fixtures, and decoration remain intact.

The decorative details continue in the 2,130-seat auditorium, but the highlight and focal decorative feature is the octagonal caisson from which a sculpted five-toed Imperial Chinese dragon springs. A large chandelier of glass hangs from the dragon's mouth, in reference to the Chinese symbol of a dragon disgorging flaming pearls. One claim puts the size of this caisson at twice the size of the model on which it was based in the throne room of the Hall of Supreme Harmony in the Forbidden City. The opening night program spoke effusively of it:

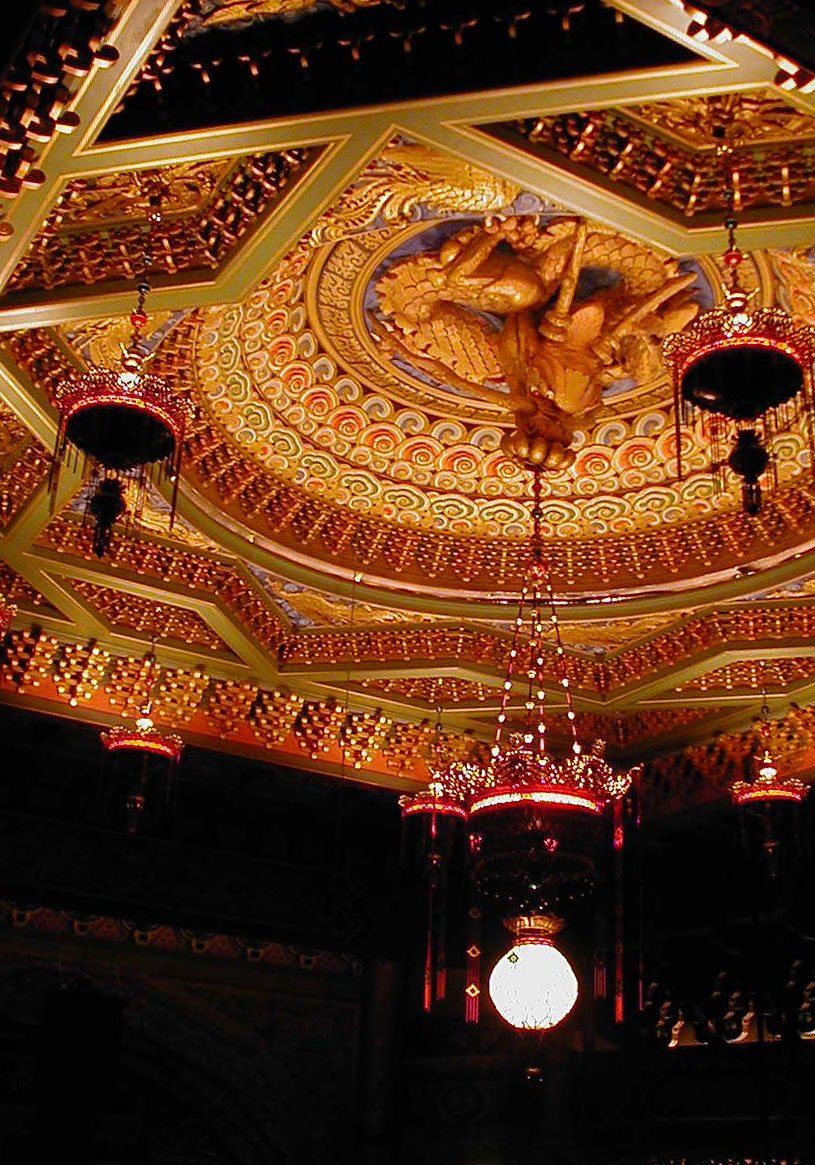
Dragon and Pearl ceiling centerpiece

... Its most imposing feature is the great dome...its symbolic themes borrowed from Chinese legends, its motifs from Chinese poetry. Coiled within an azure sphere and surrounded by glowing hues of cloud red, emblematic of calamity and welfare; blue of rain; green symbolic of plaque; black of flood; and gold of prosperity—is the Great Dragon, guardian genius of the place, his presence shadowed and multiplied in varying forms throughout the structure. On the huge beams surrounding and supporting the dome are five-clawed dragons—the Emperor's emblem—spitting fire in pursuit of the Jewel, rendered in the shape of a disc emitting effulgent rays, and symbolic of Omnipotence.

The dragon motif is repeated in the radial coffers of the caisson and the timbered coffers throughout the theatre. The Imperial dragon is accompanied by the symbol of the Empress, the Chinese phoenix (Fèng huáng), sometimes called Ho-Ho or Ho-Oh Bird from the Japanese. This personal symbol of the Empress is also repeated throughout the theatre, but most prominently in relief as part of the grills above false balconies that once screened organ pipes. In addition to these symbols, orange blossoms, chrysanthemums, and lotus flowers appear throughout the theatre. The highly decorated proscenium arch and safety curtain maintain the Chinese design influence.

Beyond the decorative features of the building, the 5th Avenue Theatre also contained notable technical features when originally built. An ascending orchestra pit and independent Wurlitzer organ platform allowed the musicians to be raised up to main stage height or to orchestra pit level from the basement below. The ventilation system had thermostatic controls throughout the building, and allowed the air to be 'washed' prior to its introduction into the venue at outlets under every third seat.

=== Significance ===
Preceding Grauman's Chinese Theater in Hollywood, the 5th Avenue Theatre "has been called the largest and most authentic example of traditional Chinese timber architecture and decoration outside of Asia." In addition, its association with architect Robert Reamer, whose other notable works include the nationally known Old Faithful Inn in Yellowstone National Park, as well as many important buildings in the Art Deco style add to its significance. The Skinner Building was added to the National Register of Historic Places on November 28, 1978.

== History ==
=== Planning and construction ===
The president and general manager of Pacific Northwest Theatres, Inc., Harry C. Arthur, believed Seattle to be a place of growing importance in the motion picture industry in the mid-1920s, and consequently as the place to invest for the long term. Arthur's company absorbed a competing chain of 40 theatres by 1926, and sought further expansion. A large holder of the theatre company's stock and debt was C. D. Stimson who sat on the board of directors of both Pacific Northwest Theatres and the Metropolitan Building Company, developer of what became known as the Metropolitan Tract. Stimson promoted the establishment of a theatre district like that which had developed around a theatre he had built in Los Angeles, California. The planned Skinner Building with a theatre owned by Arthur's company would complete the Stimson development of the Metropolitan Tract.

The architect, Robert Reamer, had joined the Metropolitan Building Company after World War I and as their house architect designed the building, inside and out. In creating the 5th Avenue Theatre, Reamer was joined by his colleague, Joseph Skoog, of Reamer's office and Gustav Liljestrom, of the S. & G. Gump Company of San Francisco.

Construction began in October 1925 with construction taking 11 months and costing $1.5 million.

=== Grand opening ===
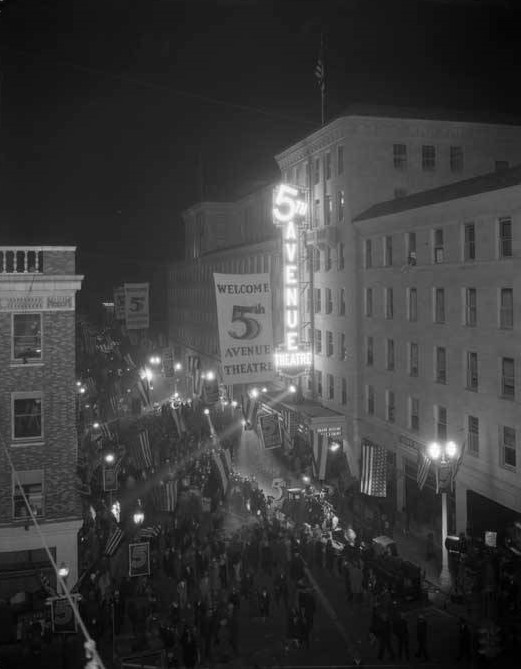
Opening night.

The theatre celebrated its grand opening on September 24, 1926, with an opening unit program that included both film and live vaudeville performances. The opening program included the silent film Young April, Fanchon and Marco's stage presentation The Night Club, and Lipschultz and his Syncopated Soloists. Oliver Wallace, a popular local musician and composer, returned from Portland, Oregon, to be the accompanying organist for opening night. Wallace had been the first theatre organist in a Seattle motion picture house.

Opening night was also marked by festivities outside the theatre. Seven blocks of downtown Seattle around the theatre were closed to street car and automobile traffic. Lured by free street car, bus, and taxicab rides, thousands of people packed Fifth Avenue between Seneca Street and Pike Street, University and Union Streets. The Seattle Times reported:

It is doubtful that any Friday night in Seattle's history saw more people circulating through all the downtown streets than were there last night. The density in the center of the activities was such that street cars were diverted...

In the street outside the building a street carnival took place. Living up to the moniker for the theater's marquee, "the Magic Sign of a Wonderful Time", spotlights scanned the night sky, banks of Klieg lights illuminated the streets outside the theater, and flares were shot from the roofs of nearby buildings. Additionally, dance bands were placed at the closed intersections to provide entertainment and, using giant screens to project the words, a sing-along was orchestrated on Fifth Avenue in front of the theatre. An estimated crowd of between 50,000 and 100,000 people participated in the events.

=== Decline and restoration ===
Following the grand opening, the theatre served as a venue for vaudeville and film, and following the decline of vaudeville as a movie palace until the 1970s. With the economic recession, the advent of television, and movie complex development in the suburbs, crowds dwindled and the theatre struggled to stay open. It was forced to close its doors in 1978 along with the nearby Orpheum theatre. A variety of re-use possibilities were proposed for the theatre including a Chinese restaurant, a triplex movie theater, an office building, or a shopping center. The city of Seattle was unable to protect the theatre as a designated landmark because of its unique position on the site of the original territorial university grounds owned by the state of Washington.

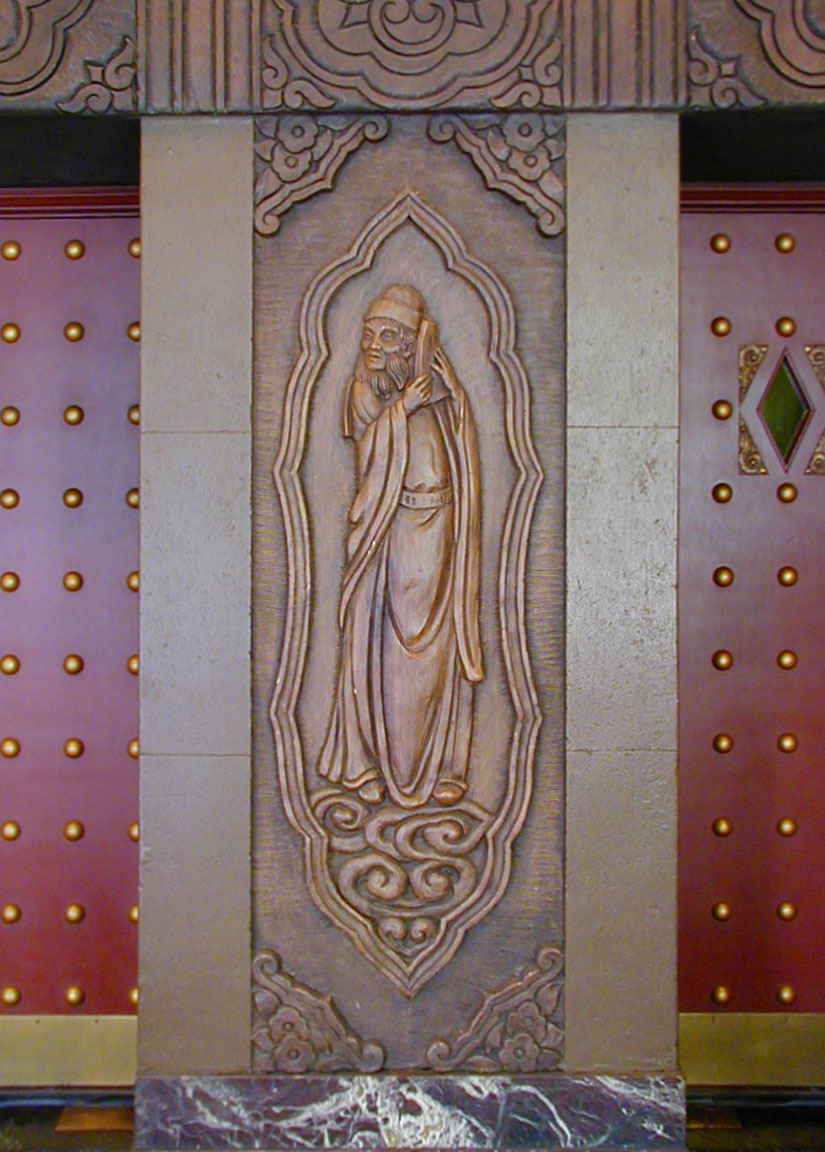
Relief at entry

In 1979, 43 business leaders formed the non-profit 5th Avenue Theatre Association and underwrote a US$2.6 million loan to save the theatre. Among these was Ned Skinner of the shipbuilding family who was an active patron of the theatre. Architect Richard McCann oversaw the restoration efforts.

Several changes were made during the renovation. The vertical marquee which had marked the theatre's presence from 1926 to 1980, was removed, the orchestra pit and auditorium seating were rebuilt, the dressing rooms moved, and the technical systems updated. However, the furniture, fixtures and interior signage were retained. Even the paint was carefully restored to its original luster. The renovation made it suitable again for live performances and filled Seattle's need for a touring Broadway musical venue. Renovation work was completed without federal, state, or local funds.

June 16, 1980, marked the theater's rebirth and a new chapter in Seattle's arts community. At the Grand Opening Gala for the renovated theatre, actress Helen Hayes christened the stage with a kiss and declared the 5th "a national treasure". Beginning on July 3 the 5th presented Annie, the first touring Broadway musical to appear at the theatre. The sold-out show ran for 10 weeks with a total of 77 performances.

The 5th Avenue Theatre continues to operate with the assistance of many donors and volunteers.

=== Post-1980 history ===
Since the renovation, the 5th Avenue Theatre has become one of Seattle's most established theatres. In 1989, The 5th Avenue Musical Theatre Company was established as the resident non-profit theatre company.

On February 28, 2001, the Nisqually earthquake rocked the 5th Avenue Theatre. At the time, actors were on stage rehearsing the musical 1776. The theatre suffered minimal damages with no structural damage from the quake. Earthquake repairs included removal and replacement of 72 plaster ceiling supports and the repair of numerous cracks and damaged decorative plaster pieces in the ceiling. Contractors had to install scaffolding tall enough to reach the highest interior crevice in the ceiling eight stories up—the first time that area had been reached in 75 years. The chandeliers had to be lowered for repair and maintenance. As part of the repair work, Turner Construction provided services for seismic upgrades to the Skinner Building.

In November 2009 a new vertical marquee, similar to the sign that was removed as part of the 1980 renovation, was installed. The marquee was made possible through a donation from Christabel Gough, daughter of Broadway producer and early 5th Avenue promoter Roger L. Stevens. The new sign features a design inspired by both earlier marquees and the theatre's interior, uses LED lights for energy conservation, and includes a revolving "5th" sign at the marquee's top.

== The 5th Avenue Musical Theatre Company ==
=== Genesis ===
From the renovation in 1980 until 1985 the non-profit 5th Avenue Theatre successfully operated as a venue for touring Broadway shows. As the United States went through an economic downturn from 1985 to 1989 there was a shortage of touring shows for venues like the 5th. Consequently, many of the country's Broadway houses went unused for extended periods of time. However, the 5th remained open during these years with a reduced staff and was used for community events and local promoters.

This situation forced the theatre to move beyond merely being a presenter of touring musicals. In 1989, the non-profit 5th Avenue Theatre established a resident theatre company, dubbed The 5th Avenue Musical Theatre Company, to produce musicals locally. Since the theatre company's establishment, the 5th's yearly subscriber season programming has included 6 to 7 shows: national touring musicals, locally produced revivals of musical theatre classics, and premieres of bound-for-Broadway shows. With 150 musical theater performances each fall-to-spring subscriber season which attract over 30,000 subscribers and average ticket sales of 300,000 tickets annually, the 5th ranks among the nation's largest musical theater companies.

The musical company employs over 600 actors, musicians, directors, choreographers, designers, technicians, stage hands, box office staff, and administrators, making the 5th the largest theatre employer in the Puget Sound region. A non-profit, the theatre company is supported by individual and corporate donations, government sources, and box office ticket sales.

=== TUTS partnership ===
Frank M. Young was the first executive director of the 5th Avenue Musical Theatre Company. From 1989 to 1999 a collaborative partnership existed between the 5th and Houston's Theatre Under the Stars (TUTS) where Young also served as executive director. This partnership produced 10 seasons of musical theater, including both national tours and self-produced musicals. On October 17, 1989, the first 5th Avenue/TUTS self-produced musical was presented: Mame, starring Juliet Prowse. In 1995, after premiering at the 5th, Jekyll & Hyde became the first 5th Avenue Theatre production to open on Broadway in April 1997. The show was produced in cooperation with Houston's Alley Theatre and TUTS.

In August 2000 the 5th's partnership with TUTS ended as David Armstrong joined the 5th Avenue Musical Theatre Company becoming its first resident Producing Artistic Director launching a new era of collaboration with leading musical theater companies and producers across the country.

=== Broadway "testing ground" ===
Since the creation of the 5th Avenue Musical Theatre Company in 1989, the 5th has established a tradition of being a "testing ground" for new musicals before they make their debut on Broadway. Since 2001, the 5th has premiered 17 new works, nine of which have subsequently opened on Broadway.

We've become a very sought-after partner for developing Broadway musicals.

— David Armstrong, Producing Artistic Director

Some notable musicals shown to Seattle audiences at the 5th Avenue Theatre prior to their success on Broadway include: Jekyll & Hyde in 1995 which was nominated for 4 Tony Awards, Hairspray in 2002 which won 8 Tony Awards, and The Wedding Singer in 2006 which had 4 Tony Award nominations. The film adaptation of Hairspray premiered at the 5th on July 16, 2007 (4 days prior to its nationwide release) as an acknowledgement of the 5th's role in the musical's success on Broadway. The "testing ground" tradition continued in the 2008–2009 season with the pre-Broadway world premieres of Shrek the Musical, and Memphis. Both went on to win Tony awards, Shrek winning one in 2009 and Memphis winning four, including Best Musical, in 2010. In the 2009–2010 season, they premiered Catch Me If You Can, which premiered on Broadway in the spring of 2011. In their 2010–2011 season, they premiered A Christmas Story: The Musical, based on the film of the same name, which premiered on Broadway in 2012. The Fifth Avenue also staged Aladdin, based on the Disney film "Aladdin", which opened on Broadway in 2014. In the 2011–2012 season, First Date premiered as a co-production with ACT starring Eric Ankrim before heading to Broadway to star Zachary Levi and Krysta Rodriguez.

Along with their successful pre-Broadway tryouts, the 5th Avenue Theatre has also performed two musicals, Princesses in 2005 and Lone Star Love in 2007, which were originally scheduled to go to Broadway, but did not due to poor reviews. They also announced the premiere of a musical adaptation of Cry-Baby, in 2007, but it was later replaced with Buddy: The Buddy Holly Story.

=== Community outreach programs ===
The theatre also hosts a variety of special events, and offers a number of education and outreach programs to school-age children and adults reaching over 61,000 students, professional performers, and audiences each year. One example of this is the 5th Avenue High School Musical Theatre Awards which evaluate and honor the performances of student actors and stage hands in Washington state high school productions. At the end of each school year, a Tony Awards-style ceremony is held which includes high-profile presenters, performances by nominees, and acceptance speeches by the award recipients. The awards ceremony has become a useful scouting event for colleges looking to recruit talent for their drama departments.

== Productions by season ==
=== 2025-2026 season ===
- Suffs (Sept 12 - Sept 27, 2025)
- Chicago (Oct 22 – Nov 2, 2025)
- Elf (Nov 28 – Dec 28, 2025)
- Monty Python's Spamalot (Feb 4 - Feb 15, 2026)
- Jesus Christ Superstar (May 2 – May 17, 2026)

=== 2024-2025 season ===
- Mary Poppins (Nov 22 – Dec 22, 2023)
- The Last Five Years (Feb 8 – Mar 16, 2025), co-production with ACT Theatre
- Waitress (Mar 11 – Mar 30, 2025)
- Parade (Apr 16 – May 4, 2025)
- Bye Bye Birdie (June 10–29, 2025)
- After Midnight (Aug 5 – 24, 2025)

=== 2023-2024 season ===
- 1776 (Aug 2 – 6, 2023)
- The Little Mermaid (Sep 8 – Oct 8, 2023)
- Cambodian Rock Band (Sep 29 – Nov 5, 2023), co-production with ACT Theatre
- White Christmas (Nov 25 – Dec 27, 2023)
- Something's Afoot (Mar 1-24, 2024)
- Spring Awakening (Jun 7-30, 2024)
- Clue (Jul 9-21, 2024)

=== 2022–2023 season ===
- The Griswolds' Broadway Vacation (Sep 10 – Oct 2, 2022)
- Choir Boy (Sep 11 – Oct 23, 2022), co-production with ACT Theatre
- The Wiz (Nov 20 – Dec 23, 2022)
- Into the Woods (Feb 10 – Mar 5, 2023)
- Sweeney Todd (Apr 21 – May 14, 2023)
- Les Misérables (May 24 – Jun 17, 2023)

=== 2021–2022 season ===
- Beauty and the Beast (Jan 12 – Feb 6, 2022)
- Afterwords (Apr 29 – May 21, 2022)
- And So That Happened... (May 17 – Jun 26, 2022), presented at ACT Theatre
- The Prom (May 31 – Jun 19, 2022)
- Come from Away (Jul 20 – Aug 7, 2022)

=== 2019–2020 season ===
- Austen's Pride (Oct 4–27, 2019)
- Mrs. Doubtfire (Nov 26 – Dec 29, 2019)
- Bliss (Jan 31 – Feb 23, 2020)

Sister Act, Jersey Boys, Once on This Island, and Evita were planned for the season, but were canceled due to the COVID-19 pandemic. The 5th Avenue Theatre also planned to include Evita, Broadway Vacation, The Musical, Shrek The Musical, Godspell, Chilifinger! The Musical, and Come from Away in its 2020–2021 season, but all live performances were canceled until 2022.

=== 2018–2019 season ===
- Come from Away (Oct 9 – Nov 4, 2018)
- Annie (Nov 23 – Dec 30, 2018)
- Rock of Ages (Feb 1–24, 2019)
- Marie, Dancing Still (Mar 22 – Apr 14, 2019)
- Urinetown (Apr 6 – May 26, 2018), co-production with ACT Theatre
- The Lightning Thief (Apr 23–28, 2019)
- West Side Story (May 31 – Jun 23, 2019), co-production with Spectrum Dance Theater

=== 2017–2018 season ===
- Something Rotten! (Sep 12 – Oct 1, 2017)
- Ragtime (Oct 13 – Nov 5, 2017)
- Irving Berlin's Holiday Inn (Nov 24 – Dec 31, 2017)
- Mamma Mia! (Feb 2–25, 2018)
- Ride the Cyclone (Mar 10 – May 20, 2018), co-production with ACT Theatre
- Kiss Me, Kate (Apr 6–29, 2018), produced as part of the Seattle Celebrates Shakespeare citywide festival
- The Hunchback of Notre Dame (Jun 1–24, 2018)

=== Previous seasons ===
2016–2017 Season
Show	Production Type	Run Dates	Starring
Man of La Mancha	Locally Produced	October 7–30, 2016	Rufus Bonds Jr. as Don Quixote, Nova Payton as Aldonza, and Don Darryl Rivera as Sancho Panza.
The Little Mermaid	Locally Produced, followed by a 12 city tour	Nov 23 – Dec 31, 2016	Diana Huey as Ariel, Matthew Kacergis as Prince Eric, Jennifer Allen as Ursula, and Steven Blanchard as King Triton.
The Pajama Game	Locally Produced	February 9 – March 5, 2017	
Murder for Two	Co-Production with ACT - A Contemporary Theatre	March 25 – June 4, 2017	
The Secret Garden	Co-Production with DC's The Shakespeare Theatre Company	April 14 – May 6, 2017	
Romy and Michele's High School Reunion	Locally Produced, World Premiere	June 7 – July 2, 2017	
Fun Home	National Tour	July 11–30, 2017	

2015–2016 Season
Show	Production Type	Run Dates	Starring
Matilda	National Tour	Aug 18 – Sep 6, 2015	
Waterfall	Co-production with Pasadena Playhouse	Oct 1–25, 2015	Bie Sukrit as Noppon and Laura Griffith as Katherine
The Sound of Music	Locally Produced	Nov 24, 2015 – Jan 3, 2016	Kristen deLohr Helland as Maria
How to Succeed in Business Without Really Trying	Locally Produced	Jan 28 – Feb 21, 2016	Eric Ankrim as J. Pierrepont Finch and Sarah Rose Davis as Rosemary
Assassins	Co-Production with ACT - A Contemporary Theatre	Feb 27 – May 15, 2016	Kjerstine Rose Anderson, Nathan Brockett, John Coons, Nick DeSantis, Richard Gray, Laura Griffith, Frederick Hagreen, Louis Hobson, Kendra Kassebaum, Brandon O'Neill, Matt Wolfe, Designed by Brian Sidney Bembridge
A Night with Janis Joplin	Locally Produced	March 25 – April 17, 2016	Kacee Clanton as Janis Joplin
Kinky Boots	National Tour	April 27 – May 8, 2016	
Paint Your Wagon	Locally Produced	June 9–30, 2016	Robert Cuccioli as Ben Rumson, Kendra Kassebaum as Cayla Woodling, Justin Gregory Lopez as Armando, and Kristen deLohr Helland as Jennifer.
A Gentleman's Guide to Love and Murder	National Tour	July 12–31, 2016	John Rapson as the D'Ysquith Family, and Kevin Massey as Monty Navarro

2014–2015 Season
Show	Production Type	Run Dates	Starring
A Chorus Line	Locally Produced	Sept 3–28, 2014	Featuring Gabriel Corey, Paul Flanagan, Mallory King, Trina Mills, Taryn Darr, Chryssie Whitehead, Andrew Palermo, Katrina Asmar, and Sarah Rose Davis.
Kinky Boots	National Tour	Oct 7–26, 2014	
A Christmas Story	Locally Produced	Nov 25 – Dec 30, 2014	
Carousel	Locally Produced	Feb 5 – Mar 1, 2015	Brandon O'Neill and Laura Griffith
Jacques Brel is Alive and Well and Living in Paris	Co-Production with ACT - A Contemporary Theatre	Mar 7 – May 17, 2015	Eric Ankrim, Cayman Ilika, Kendra Kassebaum, Timothy McCuen Piggee, Louis Hobson (Mar 7 – Apr 12), Matt Owen (Apr 14 – May 17)
Jasper in Deadland	Locally Produced	April 30 – May 24, 2015	Matt Doyle as Jasper and Sydney Shepherd as Gretchen.
Grease	Locally Produced	July 9 – August 2, 2015	
Season Notes: A Pre-Broadway production of Something Rotten!, originally scheduled for the April/May slot in the season, was replaced by Jasper in Deadland.

2013–2014 Season
Show	Production Type	Run Dates	Starring
Secondhand Lions	World Premiere	Sept 7 – Oct 6, 2013	
Anything Goes	National Tour	Oct 15 – Nov 3, 2013	
Oliver!	Locally Produced	Nov 29 – Dec 31, 2013	
Monty Python's Spamalot	Locally Produced	Jan 30 – March 2, 2014	
Little Shop of Horrors	Co-produced with ACT—A Contemporary Theatre	March 8 – June 15, 2014	
A Room With a View	Locally Produced	April 15 – May 11, 2014	
The Gershwins' Porgy and Bess	National Tour	June 11–29, 2014	

2012–2013 Season
Show	Production Type	Run Dates	Starring
Memphis	National Tour	Sept 18 – Oct 7, 2012	
The Addams Family	National Tour	Oct 24 – Nov 11, 2012	
Elf	Locally Produced	Nov 30 – Dec 31, 2012	
Grey Gardens	Locally Produced	Nov 25 – Dec 31, 2012	
The Music Man	Locally Produced	Feb 7 – Mar 10, 2013	
Jersey Boys	National Tour	April 4 – May 13, 2013	
The Pirates of Penzance	Locally Produced	July 11 – Aug 4, 2013	

2011–2012 Season
Show	Production Type	Run Dates	Starring
Les Misérables	National Tour	Aug 9–22, 2011	
Saving Aimee	Pre-Broadway World Premiere	Sep 30 – Oct 30, 2011	
Cinderella	Locally Produced	Nov 25 – Dec 31, 2011	
First Date	Co-produced with ACT—A Contemporary Theatre	Feb 11 – May 6, 2012	
Oklahoma!	Locally Produced	Feb 3 – March 4, 2012	
Damn Yankees	Co-Production with Paper Mill Playhouse	May 17 – June 5, 2012	
Rent	Locally Produced	July 6 – August 5, 2012	Jerick Hoffer

2010–2011 Season
Show	Production Type	Run Dates	Starring
In the Heights	National Tour	Sep 28 – Oct 17, 2010	
A Christmas Story, the Musical	Locally Produced	Nov 27 – Dec 19, 2010	
Vanities	Co-produced with ACT - A Contemporary Theatre	Feb 4 – April 3, 2011	
Next to Normal	National tour	Feb 22 – Mar 13, 2011	
9 to 5	National Tour	April 5–24, 2011	
Guys and Dolls	Locally Produced	May 17 – June 5, 2011	
Aladdin	Pre-Broadway World Premiere	July 7 – July 31	
Season Notes: A local production of Oklahoma!, originally scheduled for the last spot in the season, was replaced by Disney's Aladdin.

2009–2010 Season
Show	Production Type	Run Dates	Starring
Catch Me If You Can	Pre-Broadway World Premiere	July 23 – August 14	Aaron Tveit, Norbert Leo Butz
Joseph and the Amazing Technicolor Dreamcoat	Locally Produced	October 13 – November 1	Anthony Federov
White Christmas	Locally Produced	December 1–20	
South Pacific	National Tour	January 29 – February 18	
Legally Blonde	National Tour	February 23 – March 14	
On the Town	Locally Produced	April 13 – May 2	
Candide	Locally Produced	May 25 – June 13	

2008–2009 Season
Show	Production Type	Run Dates	Starring
Shrek the Musical	Pre-Broadway World Premiere	August 14 – September 21	Brian d'Arcy James, Sutton Foster
The Drowsy Chaperone	National Tour	October 28 – November 16	
7 Brides for 7 Brothers	Locally Produced	December 3–28	Ed Watts, Laura Griffith
Memphis	Pre-Broadway Showing	January 27 – February 15	Chad Kimball, Montego Glover
Hello, Dolly!	Locally Produced	March 8–29	Jenifer Lewis, Pat Cashman
Sunday in the Park with George	Locally Produced	April 21 – May 10	Hugh Panaro, Billie Wildrick
Grease	National Tour	May 12–30	Taylor Hicks

2007–2008 Season
Show	Production Type	Run Dates	Starring
Lone Star Love	Locally Produced	September 8–30	Randy Quaid
Into The Woods	Locally Produced	October 19 – September 10	Lisa Estridge
Whistle Down the Wind	National Tour	November 13 – December 2	
Jersey Boys	National Tour	December 5 – January 12	
Mame	Locally Produced	February 9 – March 2	Dee Hoty
Cabaret	Locally Produced	March 25 – April 13	Nick Garrison, Teri Kelly
Season Notes: Lone Star Love was originally scheduled to premiere on Broadway following its run at the 5th, but was canceled due to complications with star Randy Quaid.

2006–2007 Season
Show	Production Type	Run Dates	Starring
Bombay Dreams	National Tour	September 12 – October 1	
Company	Locally Produced	October 17 – November 1	Hugh Panaro
White Christmas	Locally Produced	November 28 – December 17	Michael Gruber
Buddy: The Buddy Holly Story	Locally Produced	February 14 – March 4	Billy Joe Huels
Camelot	National Tour	March 20 – April 8	Michael York
Edward Scissorhands	National Tour	April 25 – May 13	
West Side Story	Locally Produced	May 29 – June 17	Louis Hobson
Season Notes: A 5th Avenue original musical Cry-Baby (based on the Johnny Depp movie), originally scheduled for the fourth spot in the season, was replaced by Buddy: The Buddy Holly Story.

2005–2006 Season
Show	Production Type	Run Dates	Starring
The King and I	National Tour	September 20 – October 9	Lucy Lawless
Sweeney Todd	Locally Produced	October 25 – November 13	Carol Swarbrick, Allen Fitzpartick
The Sound of Music	Locally Produced	November 29 – December 18	Kim Huber, Terrence Mann
The Wedding Singer	Pre-Broadway World Premiere	January 31 – February 19	Stephen Lynch
Wonderful Town	Locally Produced	March 21 – April 9	Sarah Rudinoff, Billie Wildrick
Pippin	Locally Produced	May 9–28	Louis Hobson
Les Misérables	National Tour	May 24 – June 4	
Season Notes: Dr. Dolittle, originally scheduled for the third spot in the season, was replaced by The Sound of Music. Buddy: The Buddy Holly Story, originally scheduled for the fifth spot in the season, was replaced by The Wedding Singer before the season began. The National Tour of Les Misérables was added to the end of the season for a special two-week engagement.

2004–2005 Season
Show	Production Type	Run Dates	Starring
Hairspray	National Tour	September 7–26	
Smokey Joe's Cafe	Locally Produced	October 19 – November 7	
Peter Pan	National Tour	December 1–19	Cathy Rigby
Singin' in the Rain	Locally Produced	February 13 – March 5	
Miss Saigon	National Tour	April 5–24	
Gentlemen Prefer Blondes	Locally Produced Concert Staging	May 13–15	Lucy Lawless & Faith Prince
Princesses	Pre-Broadway World Premiere	August 9–28	
Season Notes: We Will Rock You the musical (based on the music of Queen), originally scheduled for the sixth spot in the season, was replaced by a concert staging of Gentlemen Prefer Blondes which ran for three days only. The Pre-Broadway World Premiere of Princesses was added to the end of the season shortly after We Will Rock You was canceled.

Seasons prior to 2004–2005
2003–2004: The Rocky Horror Show; Flower Drum Song; The Wizard of Oz; A Funny Thing Happened on the Way to the Forum; Dreamgirls; Thoroughly Modern Millie, National Tour; Yankee Doodle Dandy!, World Premiere	2002–2003: Hairspray, Pre-Broadway World Premiere; Blast!, National Tour; The Full Monty, National Tour; A Chorus Line; My Fair Lady; Les Misérables, National Tour; Hair; 42nd Street, National Tour
2001–2002: A Little Night Music; The Prince And The Pauper; Kiss Me, Kate, National Tour; The Most Happy Fella; Hair	2000–2001: Parade, National Tour; Anything Goes; Barry Manilow's Copacabana, National Tour; 1776; Gypsy, Starring Judy Kaye
1999: Camelot; Titanic, National Tour; Guys & Dolls; Footloose, National Tour	1999–2000: Les Misérables, National Tour; Grand Hotel; The Secret Garden; Martin Guerre, Pre-Broadway World Premiere; The Phantom Of The Opera, National Tour
1997–1998: Les Misérables, National Tour; Peter Pan, National Tour Starring Cathy Rigby; Hot Shoe Shuffle; Victor/Victoria; Two For The Show, Starring Tommy Tune & Sandy Duncan	1996–1997: Music Of The Night, National Tour; Me & My Girl; Singin' in the Rain; Disney's Beauty And The Beast, National Tour; The King And I, National Tour
1995–1996: Man Of La Mancha, Starring John Cullum; The Music Man; Kiss of the Spider Woman, National Tour Starring Chita Rivera; 42nd Street; Fiddler On The Roof, National Tour Starring Theodore Bikel; Carousel, Royal National Theatre Production; Les Misérables, National Tour	1994–1995: Crazy for You, National Tour; The Wizard of Oz; Jekyll & Hyde, Pre-Broadway World Premiere; Follies
1993–1994: Will Rogers Follies, National Tour Starring Mac Davis; Cinderella; South Pacific; Kismet, Starring Patrice Munsel	1992–1993: Les Misérables, National Tour; Annie Warbucks, Pre-Broadway World Premiere; The Phantom Of The Opera, Third National Touring Company Originating In Seattle; Brigadoon; Sayonara
1991–1992: Kopit & Yeston's Phantom, Starring Richard White; Here's Love; West Side Story; Paint Your Wagon, Starring Roy Clark	1990–1991: The Desert Song, Starring Richard White; Oliver!, Starring Davy Jones; Les Misérables, National Tour; Evita
1989–1990: Mame, Starring Juliet Prowse; The Unsinkable Molly Brown, National Tour Starring Debbie Reynolds; The Sound Of Music; My Fair Lady; Jesus Christ Superstar	1986–1988: No musicals presented/produced; outside rentals only.
1985: 42nd Street, National Tour	1984: Nine, National Tour; Sugar Babies, National Tour Starring Ann Miller, Mickey Rooney; Jerry's Girls, National Tour Starring Carol Channing, Leslie Uggams & Andrea McArdle; Steve & Eydie, National Tour
1983: On Your Toes, National Tour; Woman of the Year, National Tour Starring Lauren Bacall	1982: Pirates Of Penzance, National Tour Starring Peter Noone & James Belushi; Seven Brides for Seven Brothers, National Tour Starring Debby Boone; Colette, World Premiere Starring Diana Rigg; A Day In Hollywood, A Night In The Ukraine, National Tour; Doug Henning, National Tour; Annie, National Tour; Hello, Dolly!, National Tour Starring Carol Channing; A Chorus Line, National Tour; Lena Horne: A Lady And Her Music, National Tour; Evita, National Tour; Show Boat, National Tour Starring Donald O'Connor; Children of a Lesser God, National Tour; Sugar Babies, National Tour
1981: The Winslow Boy, National Tour; Annie, National Tour; West Side Waltz, National Tour Starring Katharine Hepburn; Camelot, National Tour Starring Richard Harris; Little Johnny Jones, National Tour Starring David Cassidy; On Golden Pond, National Tour Starring James Whitmore; Oklahoma!, National Tour; Fiddler On The Roof, National Tour Starring Herschel Bernardi	1980: Annie, National Tour; I Do! I Do!, National Tour Starring Howard Keel & Jane Powell; On a Clear Day You Can See Forever, National Tour Starring Robert Goulet; A Chorus Line, National Tour

== See also ==
- Paramount Theater, Seattle's other theater producing Broadway Musicals
- Fox Theater (Spokane, Washington)
