= Sarah Kirby-Stark =

American stage actress and theatre manager

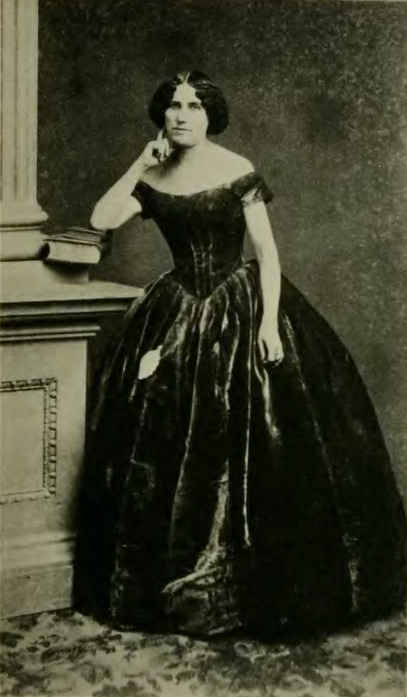
- Born: 1813
- Died: 1898 (aged 84–85)
- Occupation: Actor
- Spouse(s): J. Hudson Kirby, James Stark

Sarah Kirby-Stark (c. 1813–1898) was an American stage actress and theatre manager. She belonged to the first female theatre managers in the United States and became the first female theatre manager in California in 1850. She was a theatre pioneer in the Old West, known for having maintained a high standard with Classical Shakespeare in the West, where theatres normally often offered circus and musical shows and became a role model for other theatre managers in the West.

She was the manager of the Tehama Theatre in Sacramento with J. B. Atwater in 1850, Union Theatre in San Francisco with "Mrs Woodward" in 1856–57, the first theatre in San Jose 1859 and the Metropolitan in San Francisco with Emily Jordan in 1863–64, and managed her own touring theatre company in between.
