= Scandalous: The Life and Trials of Aimee Semple McPherson =

Scandalous
- The Musical
- Broadway Playbill
- Music: David Pomeranz; David Friedman
- Lyrics: Kathie Lee Gifford
- Book: Kathie Lee Gifford
- Basis: The life of Aimee Semple McPherson
- Productions: 2005 White Plains, New York; 2007 Arlington, Virginia; 2011 Seattle, Washington; 2012 Broadway

Scandalous: The Life and Trials of Aimee Semple McPherson is a musical with a book and lyrics by Kathie Lee Gifford and music by David Pomeranz and David Friedman. The musical has had productions in 2005 at the White Plains, New York Performing Arts Center, at the Signature Theatre in 2007, in 2011 at the 5th Avenue Theatre in Seattle and in 2012 on Broadway. The musical is based on the life of Aimee Semple McPherson.

== Overview ==
The musical relates events in the life of early 20th century evangelist and pop culture icon Aimee Semple McPherson. It follows her life and career from her childhood to her controversial death in 1944, focusing on her mysterious kidnapping and the ensuing trial. Other highlights include her becoming the first woman to obtain a radio broadcast license in the United States, her cross-country drive unaccompanied by a man, her multimedia empire that included several newspapers, and her interactions with such contemporaries as Charles Chaplin and William Randolph Hearst.

== Productions ==
Saving Aimee debuted at the White Plains Performing Arts Center in October 2005. The cast featured Carolee Carmello as Aimee and Florence Lacey. A revised production, directed by Eric Schaeffer and choreographed by Christopher d'Amboise, opened on April 10, 2007 at the Signature Theatre in Arlington, Virginia for a limited run, with Carolee Carmello again in the title role.

Four years later, the musical played at the 5th Avenue Theatre in Seattle, Washington, from September 30 to October 29, 2011. It was directed by David Armstrong, artistic director at 5th Avenue, with choreography by Lorin Laterro, sets by Walt Spangler and costumes by Gregory A. Poplyk. Carmello again played Aimee, with Judy Kaye as Minnie Kennedy, Roz Ryan as Emma Jo Schaffer and Ed Dixon.

The musical premiered on Broadway at the Neil Simon Theatre, with previews starting on October 13, 2012, and opening officially on November 15, 2012. Carmello starred again, with George Hearn playing both Aimee's father James Kennedy and a preacher Brother Bob. Ed Watts played Aimee's husband, and Roz Ryan was again Emma Jo. Direction and choreography was again by Armstrong and Latarro, sets and costumes were again by Spangler and Poplyk, and lighting was by Natasha Katz. The new title of the musical was Scandalous: The Life and Trials of Aimee Semple McPherson. The producers included Foursquare Foundation and Dick DeVos, which The New York Times noted were "unusual newcomers", as Foursquare Foundation provided "grants to evangelical churches and ministries."

Scandalous closed on December 9, 2012 after only 29 regular performances and 31 previews. Although The New York Dream Center purchased tickets for area residents affected by Hurricane Sandy (producing an increase of $175,000 in gross sales from the week before), the theater was still only filled to "37.6 percent of capacity during the week" of December 2. Despite Kathie Lee Gifford's constant promotion of the show on NBC's "The Today Show," for which she was a host, the show could not "stay afloat".

Carolee Carmello was nominated for a 2013 Tony Award in the category of Best Performance By An Actress In A Leading Role in A Musical and for a Drama Desk Award as Outstanding Actress in a Musical. The cast recording was released in 2013.

== Musical Numbers ==
The musical numbers from the 2012 Broadway production are:

Act I

- "Stand Up" – Aimee & Ensemble
- "Minnie's Prayer" – Minnie
- "Why Can't I?" – Aimee
- "He Will Be My Home" – Robert & Aimee
- "Come Whatever May" – Robert & Aimee
- "He Will Be My Home" (Reprise) – Robert, Aimee, James & Minnie
- "That Sweet Lass From Cork" – Ensemble
- "Come Whatever May" (Reprise) – Robert, Aimee & Ensemble
- "How Could You?" – Aimee
- "You Have a Fire" - Aimee & James
- "Minnie's Prayer" (Reprise) – Minnie
- "Follow Me" (Part 1) – Aimee & Ensemble
- "A Girl's Gotta Do What a Girl's Gotta Do" – Emma Jo & Girls
- "Follow Me" (Part 2) - Aimee & Ensemble
- "For Such a Time as This" - Aimee & Ensemble

Act II

- "Hollywood Aimee" – Reporters
- "Adam and Eve" – Aimee, David & Eve
- "Foursquare March" – Aimee & Ensemble
- "Samson and Delilha" – Aimee, David & Ensemble
- "Hollywood Aimee" (Reprise) – Reports
- "Moses and Pharaoh" – Aimee, David, Emma Jo & Ensemble
- "It's Just You" – Kenneth & David
- "The Coconut Grove" - The Lovely Coconuts, Louella & Reports
- "No Other Choice" – Minnie
- "Hollywood Aimee" (Reprise) - Ensemble
- "Lost or Found?" - Aimee, Asa & Ensemble
- "What Does It Profit?" - Aimee
- "I Have a Fire" - Aimee & Ensemble

The musical numbers from the 2011 Seattle production are:

Act I

- "Prelude" - Orchestra
- "Stand Up" – Aimee & Ensemble
- "For Such A Time As This" (Part 1) - Minnie
- "Why Can't I?" – Aimee
- "He Will Be My Home" – Robert & Aimee
- "He Will Be My Home" (Reprise) – Robert, Aimee, James & Minnie
- "Oh, the Power" - Robert, Aimee & Ensemble
- "That Sweet Lass From Cork" – Ensemble
- "Come Whatever May" – Robert, Aimee & Ensemble
- "You'll Be Safe Here With Me" - Mac (Harold Stewart McPherson) & Aimee
- "Follow Me" – Aimee & Ensemble
- "A Girl's Gotta Do What a Girl's Gotta Do" – Emma Jo & Girls
- "Follow Me" (Reprise) - Aimee & Ensemble
- "For Such a Time as This" (Part 2) - Aimee & Ensemble

Act II

- "Hollywood Aimee" (Part 1) – Reporters
- "Adam and Eve" – Aimee, David & Eve
- "Foursquare March/Hollywood Aimee" (Part 2) – Aimee & Ensemble
- "Samson and Delilha" – Aimee, David & Ensemble
- "Hollywood Aimee" (Part 3) – Reports
- "Moses and Pharaoh" – Aimee, David, Emma Jo & Ensemble
- "Hollywood Aimee (Part 4) - Reporters
- "It's Just You" – Kenneth
- "This Time I'll Blame It On Love" – Aimee & David
- "Lost or Found?/The Trial" - Full Company
- "He'll Be My Home" (Reprise) - Aimee
- "Oh, the Power" (Reprise) - Aimee & Ensemble
- "I Have a Fire" - Aimee & Ensemble

The musical numbers from the 2007 Virginia production are:

Act I

- "Stand Up" – Aimee & Ensemble
- "For Such a Time as This" - Minnie
- "Why Can't I?" – Aimee
- "He Will Be My Home" – Robert & Aimee
- "That Sweet Lass From Cork" – Ensemble
- "Come Whatever May" – Robert & Aimee
- "I Will Love You That Way" - Mac (Harold Stewart McPherson) & Aimee
- "Follow Me!" – Aimee & Ensemble
- "A Girl's Gotta Do What a Girl's Gotta Do" – Emma Jo & Girls
- "Why Can't I Just Be a Woman" - Aimee

Act II

- "God Will Provide" - Emma Jo
- "Adam and Eve" – Aimee, David & Eve
- "Samson and Delilha" – Aimee, David & Ensemble
- "Let My People Go!" – Aimee, David, Emma Jo & Ensemble
- "Saving Aimee" – Minnie
- "The Silent, Sorrowful Shadows" - Aimee
- "Demon in a Dress" - Brother Bob
- "Emma Jo's Lament" - Emma Jo
- "Lost or Found?" - Aimee, Asa & Ensemble
- "Paying The Price" - Aimee
- "I Had Fire" - Aimee & Ensemble

Songs cut from earlier versions of the production:

- "The Silent, Sorrowful Shadows" - Aimee
- "God Will Provide" - Emma Jo
- "Emma Jo's Lament" - Emma Jo
- "A Letter From Home" - James
- "Demon in a Dress" - Brother Bob
- "Saving Aimee" - Minnie

== Critical reception ==
In its review of the Signature Theatre production, Variety wrote: "All is contained in Gifford's exceedingly thorough book, ripping nonstop from one crisis to another under Schaeffer's free-flowing direction. Pomeranz and Friedman break up the action with an enjoyable blend of tunes that opens with the spirited "Stand Up!"; highlights include an Irish jig, a rousing spiritual, some big ensemble numbers, and Aimee's signature tune, "Why Can't I Just Be a Woman?" " The theatremania reviewer of the same production wrote that the musical is a "rousing experience, thanks to a group of tour-de-force performances, especially from ... Carmello in the title role, and songs ... that add layers of emotional shading missing from the dialogue played out between them. Director Eric Schaeffer's deft hand maximizes the show's strengths, fusing performers, songs, and story into an entertaining blend."

Broadway reviewer, Jeff Daniel gave the show a "Grade F", saying: "Scandalous: The Life and Trials of Aimee Semple McPherson is among the four or five worst Broadway musicals I've seen in nearly 30 years of attending shows." New York Theater critic, Jonathan Mandell wrote in his piece, Scandalous Review: Kathie Lee Gifford’s Broadway Term Paper, "How come, if television host Kathie Lee Gifford spent some 13 years writing this musical, it still feels like a work in progress? ... The subtitle of “Scandalous” is a more accurate description of it: “The life and trials of Aimee Semple McPherson.” That life is told in such detail that it becomes something of a trial itself. ... It is frankly hard to trust this show. The problem is in part that Gifford, again the earnest student, seems to want to present a balanced picture – but one that errs on the side of sympathy." New York Theater Guide gave it one-star out of five, presenting critic reviews: "Isn't so much scandalously bad as it is generic and dull," Christopher Isherwood, New York Times (November 15, 2012), "Isn't disastrous. It's merely monotonous," Elisabeth Vincentelli, New York Post (November 17, 2012), "Unlikely to spark any hosannas," Frank Scheck, The Hollywood Reporter (November 21, 2012), and "Carmello's miracle work doesn't extend to Gifford's flimsy, expository musical," Suzy Evans, Back Stage (August 28, 2019).

== See also ==
- Aimee Semple McPherson
