= Lone Star Love =

- Music: Jack Herrick
- Lyrics: Jack Herrick
- Book: John L. Haber; Robert Horn
- Basis: Shakespeare play, The Merry Wives of Windsor
- Productions: 2004 Off-Broadway; 2007 Broadway cancelled

Lone Star Love, or, The Merry Wives of Windsor, Texas is a musical based on Shakespeare's The Merry Wives of Windsor. The score is by Jack Herrick (of the Red Clay Ramblers), and the book is by John L. Haber and Robert Horn. The setting of the piece has been moved to the Wild West shortly after the American Civil War, and the musical features country and bluegrass music.

== Productions ==
After a long development process beginning in Houston, Texas, in the 1980s, Lone Star Love had an Off-Broadway run in the 2004–05 season at the John Houseman Theatre directed by Michael Bogdanov and choreographed by Randy Skinner, which featured Beth Leavel and Jay O. Sanders.

The musical started pre-Broadway try-outs at the 5th Avenue Theatre, Seattle, on September 8, 2007, and had an official run from September 19 through September 30. The 2007 version included several new songs and significant modifications to the book. Randy Skinner was the director and choreographer, John Rando was creative supervisor, and the cast featured Randy Quaid, Robert Cuccioli, Dee Hoty, and Lauren Kennedy. The Red Clay Ramblers band was featured on stage. The Seattle production has been reviewed as lacking pace.

On September 24, 2007, it was announced that the Broadway engagement, which had been scheduled to begin in November at the Belasco Theatre, had been cancelled. The press release noted that plans for a Broadway run "will be announced when they are available." The New York Times reported that there was disagreement about the interpretation of the Falstaff character between one of the producers and Quaid and his wife (who is his manager), and that the producers felt that the show is not ready for Broadway. The Quaids refused to make the necessary changes to the script that were being asked of them so the producer felt there was no other choice but to close the show at the end of the Seattle run.

== Synopsis ==
"Colonel" John Falstaff travels to Windsor, Texas, after being dishonorably discharged from the Confederate Army. Upon his arrival, the rascally Falstaff woos the wives of two wealthy and pre-occupied cattle ranchers in order to gain their husbands' land and money. But the ladies are wise to Falstaff's scheme.

== Characters and cast ==
- Col. John Falstaff - Randy Quaid
- Frank Ford - Robert Cuccioli
- Agnes Ford - Lauren Kennedy
- George Page - Dan Sharkey
- Margaret Anne Page - Dee Hoty
- Miss Anne Page - Kara Lindsay
- Fenton - Clarke Thorell
- Miss Quickly - Ramona Keller

== Recording ==
The cast recording for the Off-Broadway production is available through PS Classics.
