= Carolee Carmello =

American actress

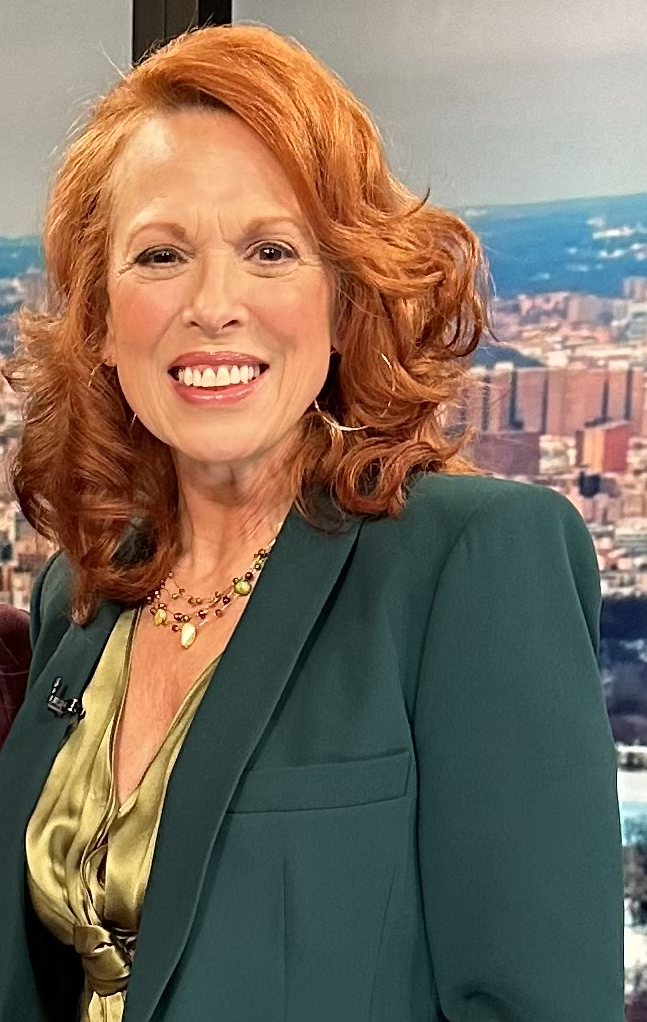
- Carmello following an appearance on Good Day New York in 2023 to promote Bad Cinderella on Broadway
- Education: University at Albany, SUNY
- Occupations: Actress; singer
- Years active: 1985–present
- Spouse: Gregg Edelman (m. 1995; div. 2015)
- Children: 2

Carolee Carmello is an American actress and singer, best known for her performances in Broadway musicals and for playing the role of Maple LaMarsh on the television series Remember WENN (1996–1998). She is a three-time Tony Award nominee and a five-time Drama Desk nominee, winning the 1999 Drama Desk Award for Outstanding Actress in a Musical for her role in Parade.

== Career ==
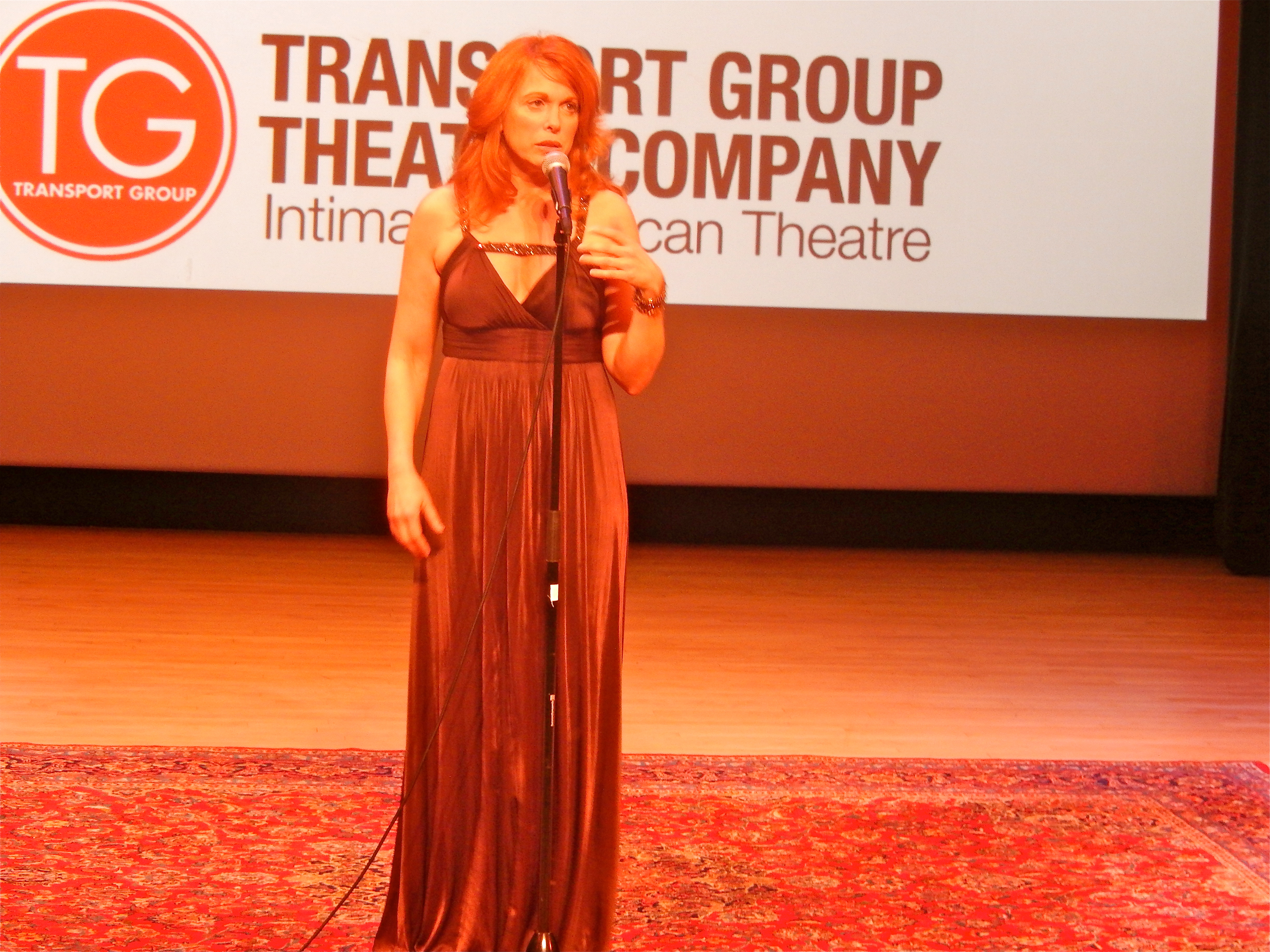
Carolee Carmello at Transport Group Gala 2013

Carmello graduated from the University at Albany with a degree in business administration.

Carmello made her Broadway debut in a small role in City of Angels and returned to close the show in the role of "Oolie/Donna". She left City of Angels to take the role of Florence in the tour of Chess, from January 1990 to May 1990. She played "Cordelia, the kosher caterer" in the original Broadway company of Falsettos and also played Abigail Adams in the revival of 1776. In the Broadway company of The Scarlet Pimpernel, Carmello was a replacement in the role of "Marguerite St. Just". She originated the role of Lucille Frank in Parade at Lincoln Center, for which she won the 1999 Drama Desk Award for Outstanding Actress in a Musical (in a tie with Bernadette Peters) and was nominated for the Tony Award for Best Actress in a Musical. Next Carmello played "Kate" in the Broadway revival of Kiss Me, Kate and "Ms. Pennywise" in Urinetown. She starred as "Gabrielle" in Lestat, for which she received nominations for the Drama Desk Award for Outstanding Featured Actress in a Musical and the Tony Award for Best Featured Actress in a Musical.

She appeared as Donna Sheridan in the long-running hit musical Mamma Mia! several times, joining the show initially in October 2004. She again joined the cast as Donna in September 2006, taking a leave from March 14, 2007, to May 13, 2007, to appear in an early version of Saving Aimee.

Carmello originated the role of Alice Beineke in the musical version of The Addams Family. For this role she was nominated for the Drama Desk Award and the Outer Critics Circle Award for Outstanding Featured Actress in a Musical.

She took over the role of the Mother Superior from Victoria Clark in the Broadway production of Sister Act on November 19, 2011. In 2012, she played Aimee Semple McPherson on Broadway in the musical Scandalous, for which she received a Drama Desk nomination and a Tony Award nomination for Best Lead Actress in a Musical. She performed the role of Mrs. du Maurier in the Broadway musical Finding Neverland from March 2015 through February 2016 and was nominated for a Drama Desk Award for Best Featured Actress in a Musical.

Carmello appeared in the role of Mae Tuck in the Broadway musical adaptation of Tuck Everlasting at the Broadhurst Theatre, beginning in April 2016. Following Tuck Everlasting's closing in May, she returned to Finding Neverland on July 5, 2016, for the show's last six weeks.

Carmello joined the US national tour of Hello, Dolly, playing Dolly Levi, from September 2019 to its closing in March 2020. In 2023, Carmello played the role of the Stepmother in the Broadway musical Bad Cinderella.

== Theatre credits ==
=== Broadway and West End ===
Source: Playbill

Year(s)	Production	Role	Location
1989	City of Angels	Ensemble/Oolie/Donna	Virginia Theatre
1992–93	Falsettos	Cordelia	John Golden Theatre
1997–98	1776	Abigail Adams	Gershwin Theatre
1998–99	Parade	Lucille Frank	Vivian Beaumont Theatre
1999–2000	The Scarlet Pimpernel	Marguerite St. Just	Neil Simon Theatre
2001	Kiss Me, Kate	Lilli Vanessi/Katharine	Martin Beck Theatre
2002	Kiss Me, Kate	Lilli Vanessi/Katharine	Victoria Palace Theatre
2003–04	Urinetown	Penelope Pennywise	Henry Miller's Theatre
2004	Mamma Mia!	Donna Sheridan	Winter Garden Theatre
2006	Lestat	Gabrielle	Palace Theatre
2006–07	Mamma Mia!	Donna Sheridan	Winter Garden Theatre
2010–11	The Addams Family	Alice Beineke	Lunt-Fontanne Theatre
2011–12	Sister Act	Mother Superior	Broadway Theatre
2012	Scandalous	Aimee Semple McPherson	Neil Simon Theatre
2015–16	Finding Neverland	Madame du Maurier	Lunt-Fontanne Theatre
2016	Tuck Everlasting	Mae Tuck	Broadhurst Theatre
2016	Finding Neverland	Madame du Maurier	Lunt-Fontanne Theatre
2022–23	1776	John Dickinson	American Airlines Theatre
2023	Bad Cinderella	The Stepmother	Imperial Theatre

=== National tours ===
- Big River as Mary Jane Wilkes (1987)
- Les Misérables as Ensemble, u/s Cosette & u/s Fantine (1987)
- Falsettos as Trina (1992-93) and Cordelia (1994)
- Chess as Florence (January 1990-May 1990)
- Hello, Dolly! as Dolly Gallagher Levi (September 2019-March 2020)
- Kimberly Akimbo as Kimberly Levaco (2024-25)

=== Regional ===
- Evita as Eva Perón at An Evening Dinner Theatre, 1985
- Grease as Sandy at Pittsburgh C.L.O., 1989
- Company as Marta at Birmingham Theatre, 1989
- Bells are Ringing Reprise! as Ella at Freud Playhouse (Los Angeles), 1999
- The King and I as Anna at Paper Mill Playhouse (Millburn, New Jersey), 2002
- On The Twentieth Century Reprise! as Lily Garland at Freud Playhouse (Los Angeles), 2003
- Baby as Arlene at Paper Mill Playhouse (Millburn, New Jersey) 2004
- Saving Aimee at Signature Theatre (Arlington, Virginia), 2007
- Little Shop of Horrors at Charles Playhouse (Boston)
- Scandalous at Pavilion Theatre (Glasgow)
- The Music Man at Schenectady Light Opera (Schenectady, New York)
- Tuck Everlasting as Mae Tuck at Alliance Theatre (Atlanta, Georgia), 2015
- Gypsy as Rose at Broadway Sacramento, 2018
- Sweeney Todd as Mrs. Lovett at Opera Saratoga (Saratoga Springs, New York), 2022
- Into the Woods as The Witch at Pittsburgh C.L.O., 2023
- Nine as Liliane LaFleur at Kennedy Center, 2024

=== Off-Broadway ===
Source: Internet Off-Broadway Database

- I Can Get It for You Wholesale (1991)
- Hello Again (1993)
- Das Barbecu (1994)
- John & Jen (1995)
- A Class Act (2000)
- The Vagina Monologues (2000)
- Elegies (2003)
- Sweeney Todd: The Demon Barber of Fleet Street (2017) as Mrs. Nellie Lovett

=== Concerts ===
- Funny Girl as Fanny (Actors Fund Benefit Concert), 2002
- God Bless You, Mr. Rosewater as Sylvia Rosewater (Cooper Union), 2003
- Showboat as Julie (Carnegie Hall), 2008
- 1776 as John Adams (54 Below), 2017
- Follies as Sally Durant Plummer (Carnegie Hall), 2024

== Accolades ==
Source: Playbill

She won $14,000 on an appearance on the Scrabble game show in 1989.

=== Awards and nominations ===
Year	Association	Category	Nominated work	Result
1996	Screen Actors Guild Awards	Outstanding Performance by an Ensemble in a Comedy Series	Remember WENN	Nominated
1999	Tony Awards	Best Actress in a Musical	Parade	Nominated
1999	Drama Desk Awards	Outstanding Actress in a Musical	Parade	Won
2006	Tony Awards	Best Featured Actress in a Musical	Lestat	Nominated
2006	Drama Desk Awards	Outstanding Featured Actress in a Musical	Lestat	Nominated
2006	Drama League Awards	Distinguished Performance	Lestat	Nominated
2010	Drama Desk Awards	Outstanding Featured Actress in a Musical	The Addams Family	Nominated
2010	Outer Critics Circle Awards	Outstanding Featured Actress in a Musical	The Addams Family	Nominated
2013	Tony Awards	Best Actress in a Musical	Scandalous: The Life and Trials of Aimee Semple McPherson	Nominated
2013	Drama Desk Awards	Outstanding Actress in a Musical	Scandalous: The Life and Trials of Aimee Semple McPherson	Nominated
2015	Drama Desk Awards	Outstanding Featured Actress in a Musical	Finding Neverland	Nominated

== Personal life ==
She is divorced from fellow actor Gregg Edelman. They have two children. She resides in Leonia, New Jersey.
