= New York Dream Center =

Church in Manhattan, New York

- New York City Dream Center
- Location within New York
- 40°44′33″N 74°0′9″W
- Location: 333 West 17th St. New York, New York
- Country: United States
- Denomination: International Church of the Foursquare Gospel (Protestant Pentecostalism)
- Website: DreamCenter.nyc

History
- Founded: 2008
- Founder(s): Matthew Barnett; Tommy Barnett v Brad Reed

The New York Dream Center is a church in New York City which was founded in the summer of 2008 as an offshoot of the LA Dream Center church. The church's current pastors are Stella Reed and her husband Brad Reed who also serves as the church's manager. Both were formerly part of the LA Dream Center's leadership. The church currently has 501(c)(3) non-profit status.

== Locations ==
Originally located at the New York City Lab School for Collaborative Studies in Chelsea, Manhattan, the church opened a second location in Bushwick, Brooklyn in 2019. The church also runs additional programs throughout New York City including the Dream Center Leadership Program which focuses on five key elements: "The Gospel", "Serving Communities", "City Outreach", "Our Calling", and "Sharing the Gospel".

== Stated goals ==
The church's stated mission is "to walk alongside people right where they are, to where God dreams for them to be."
