= David Armstrong (director) =

American theatre director

David Armstrong is a theatre producer and director, author and host of the podcast Broadway Nation which is part of the Broadway Podcast Network.

== Career ==
Armstrong's work has been seen in New York, Los Angeles and at regional theaters including The Kennedy Center, Ordway Center, Ford's Theatre, Cincinnati Playhouse, and New Jersey's Paper Mill Playhouse. From 1990 through 1995, he served as artistic director of Cohoes Music Hall in upstate NY. Armstrong has also written the books for the musicals The Wonder Years (winner of seven Drama-Logue Awards), Gold Rush , and Yankee Doodle Dandy!

From 2000 to 2018 he served as the Executive Producer and artistic director of The 5th Avenue Theatre in Seattle. During his tenure there he has guided The 5th Avenue to a position as one of the nation's leading musical theater companies, acclaimed for both its development and production of new works and its innovative stagings of classic musicals. As a director, he staged 5th Avenue productions of Jacques Brel is Alive and Well & Living in Paris, A Room With a View; Oliver!, Candide, Sweeney Todd, HAIR, A Little Night Music, Company, Hello, Dolly!, Anything Goes, MAME, Pippin, The Secret Garden, Vanities, White Christmas, The Rocky Horror Show, Yankee Doodle Dandy, and Saving Aimee.

He made his Broadway directing debut in November 2012 with the musical Scandalous, which started at The 5th Avenue as Saving Aimee.

In July 2024 his book Broadway Nation: How Immigrant, Jewish, Queer, and Black Artists invented the Broadway Musical, sharing its principal name with the podcast, on the history of Broadway musical theater was published by Methuen Drama.
