= Theater manager =

Administrator of a theater

A theater manager, also called a general manager, managing director, or intendant (British English), is the administrator of a theater. They often also have the responsibilities of an artistic director but in any case oversee all administrative, marketing, production, and financial functions of their theater. They often report to a board and must have excellent communication skills, the ability to work independently, and strong organizational capacity. They also typically have prior training or experience in one of the art forms and have experience working in professional productions in some capacity. They must also have experience with budget creation and management, planning, budgeting/financial tracking, contract management, accounting, and schedule tracking.

== History ==
Arts management as an academic field came into existence in the second half of the 20th century primarily in North America and Europe. In 1965, the National Endowment for the Arts program was established and served the purpose of offering grants to arts organizations throughout the country. In order to maintain accountability and documentation of where and how money was being spent, the role of theater manager became a necessary component of these establishments. This role initially began as the management of professional public and nonprofit organizations that gained popularity in the 1980s. However, in recent years theater managers have been employed in a wider range of nonprofit and for profit organizations in music, theater, opera, and dance.

== Education ==
The first school to begin offering formal educational training for theater management was Yale University school of Drama in the 1960s. Since then many colleges and universities have followed suit. Most degree programs in this department began at the graduate level because it was considered necessary for prospective students to have first obtained an undergraduate degree in the arts or theater, and procuring experience in production and entry level administrative processes. Furthermore, prospective theater managers are encouraged to expand their knowledge on topics such as accounting, planning, tax systems, marketing and more as this profession requires all of those qualities to operate.

== Responsibilities ==
The responsibilities of a theater manager include decision making, dealing with large groups of people in an equitable manner, identifying funding sources, budgeting, and ensuring smooth operation of their establishment. Furthermore theater managers are expected to forecast developments in the industry, seek out new markets of patrons, and speak on behalf of their organization.

== See also ==
- List of theater managers and producers
- Opera management
