= G. D. Sweet Famous Players =

Theater company from Iowa, United States

The G. D. Sweet Famous Players was an American theater company that performed in tent shows and opera houses. The company was founded by George D. Sweet and was based in Storm Lake, Iowa. Its performers included Sweet's family members. The performances were named "Sunday school" shows because they were family friendly. The company performed well-known Broadway pieces including Abie's Irish Rose and Up in Mabel's Room. The theater company toured throughout Iowa including in Le Mars, Sioux City, and Humboldt. Sweet died on November 30, 1936, from injuries due to a traffic collision three days prior in Louisiana. The shows originally ended following his death, and Frank Gifford took over the company until 1941. At some point, Vincent Dennis took over the company and held performances in Spencer, Iowa, in May 1947.

== Members ==
George D. Sweet may have spent his childhood in Early, Iowa, and Storm Lake, Iowa. He moved from Storm Lake to marry an actress, later working in opera houses in small towns and tent shows focusing on repertory theatre. His wife was able to sing well and the two of them played one-night performances in opera houses. In 1903, he was the manager of the George D. Sweet show troupe and had four parts in the play A Messenger Boy. Sometime after 1910, he founded the G. D. Sweet Famous Players. Storm Lake was his headquarters and where he lived during the winter. The book The Opera Houses of Iowa described him as "a showman" and "a large, imposing man, given to cigars and pearl-gray hats worn jauntily". He rode a black Kissel limousine throughout Storm Lake and his actors would also ride along. Because he was not a performer, much of the praise went to his wife and daughter. He had a few minor roles such as a sheriff. Author Marjorie Holmes wrote: "'Hi, G. D.!', those who claimed to know him would call eagerly; and no honor swelled the bosom more than to receive his nod and be grandly waved in free." During the Great Depression, the Sioux City Journal said that Sweet thinks "that the public is demanding more for money than ever before, so he is providing only the best of current plays for his company."

While Sweet owned the company, performers included his wife, his daughter Marjorie, and his brother Lorenzo. Beyond him, the other directors were Billy Lee and Frank Marlowe. Holmes wrote "Sometimes it was Mrs. Sweet who reigned, white-haired, diamonds flashing like some grand duchess of fairyland. She was rich-voiced, rollicking, flattering, but she seldom let anyone in without paying." She continued with: "Mrs. Sweet was the undisputed star." In January 1936, the Sweet couple were living in Hot Springs, Arkansas. Marjorie Sweet acted since she was three years old, and left high school in Storm Lake during her senior year to take her mother's role while Mrs. Sweet was ill. She had starring roles in other plays since then. Robert Vaughn toured with the company during the summer when he was 12 years old. Other performers were recruited from multiple stock companies. The amount of performers were unknown from the 1920s to the 1930s and each performer had multiple jobs in the company.

== Early performances ==
The performances were named "Sunday school" shows because they were family friendly; words like "hell" or "damn" were never used. Most performances were in tents with three-day runs and four to five acts. The scenery changed with each act. The company performed in multiple towns throughout Iowa, including a summer 1941 tour in the state. The company performed well-known Broadway pieces including Abie's Irish Rose and Up in Mabel's Room. Marjorie Sweet had a starring role in the 1911 play A Messenger Boy. The Sioux City Journal said in September 1930 that the theater company would be in Le Mars, Iowa, to present the plays Skidding, Abie's Irish Rose, What a Woman Wants, and Little Miss Bluebeard from September 4 to September 7, 1930. G. D. Sweet Famous Players had their first tour in Woodbury County, Iowa, in 1931. In 1932, the theater company premiered the play Inside the Law in Sioux City, Iowa, in which a former department store clerk is imprisoned after she is accused of theft. The Sioux City Journal wrote that the play has an "intense story" and "wholesome comedy". The Humboldt Republican announced in June 1933 that the plays One Man's Woman, Treat 'Em Rough, and Our New Minister would be held in Humboldt, Iowa, from July 3 to July 5, 1933. An August 1933 performance of Up in Mabel's Room, about a wife who is jealous of a woman her husband once gave a gift to, in Sioux City was praised by the Sioux City Journal as "one of the most comical offerings ever presented on the stage." George Sweet had a character role in the play.

== Later years ==
Sweet died on November 30, 1936, from injuries due to a traffic collision three days prior in Louisiana. His body was sent to Storm Lake for burial. The shows originally ended following his death, and Frank Gifford took over the company until 1941. It was mentioned in August 1941 that the theater company would perform the play "Drafted by Mistake" at the Clay County Fair from September 8 to September 13, 1943. In the play, a man is accidentally drafted into the army after a physical examination to receive a marriage license. At some point, Vincent Dennis took over the company and held performances in Spencer, Iowa, in May 1947. In February 1949, Billboard advertised an upcoming tent show that has a boss canvasman, who is in charge of putting up the tent, and a pianist. On February 17, 1951, Dennis tried to recruit performers in a Billboard advertisement. Mrs. Sweet died in 1953 at age 75 in a Chicago, Illinois, hospital. She was buried at the Storm Lake cemetery. The Sweet estate was sold, including two farms, after Mrs. Sweet died.
