= Ernst Boerschmann =

German architect, photographer, and sinologist

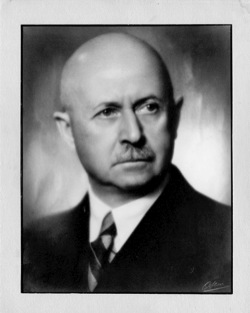
- Ernst Boerschmann (1934)
- Born: 18 February 1873; Priekulė, Lithuania, Klaipėda Region, Lithuania
- Died: 30 April 1949 (aged 76); Bad Pyrmont, Hamelin-Pyrmont, Lower Saxony, Germany
- Education: Technische Universität Berlin
- Occupations: Architect, photographer, sinologist

Ernst Boerschmann (18 February 1873 – 30 April 1949) was a German architect, photographer, and sinologist known for his research on and photography of historical Chinese architecture. He was the first foreigner to systematically document China's religious architecture, compiling thousands of photographs, sketches, and architectural surveys over multiple trips to China in the first half of the twentieth century.

== Biography ==
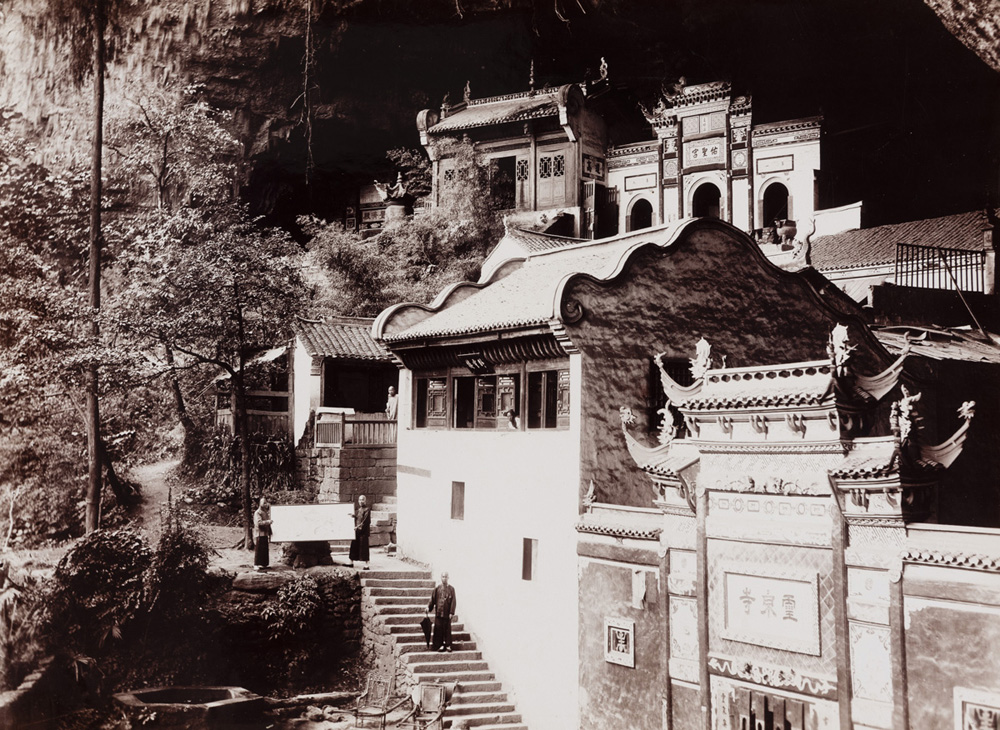
Photograph by Ernst Boerschmann. Source: the Stephan Loewentheil Collection

Ernst Boerschmann was born in Priekulė, Klaipėda Region, Lithuania, on 18 February 1873. His brother Friedrich Börschmann (1870–1941) was a physician, and his sister Anna Börschmann (1871–1939) was an educator.

As a child, Boerschmann attended the Humanistische Gymnasium in Memel. He entered the Technische Hochschule in Berlin (today Technische Universität Berlin) in 1891, majoring in Architecture, where he graduated in 1896. After college, he joined the Staatsexamen and graduated in 1901 as an Assessor. From 1902 to 1904, he was an Engineer with the East Asian Occupation Brigade (Ostasiatischen Besatzungsbrigade) in China, where he became interested in classical Chinese architecture.

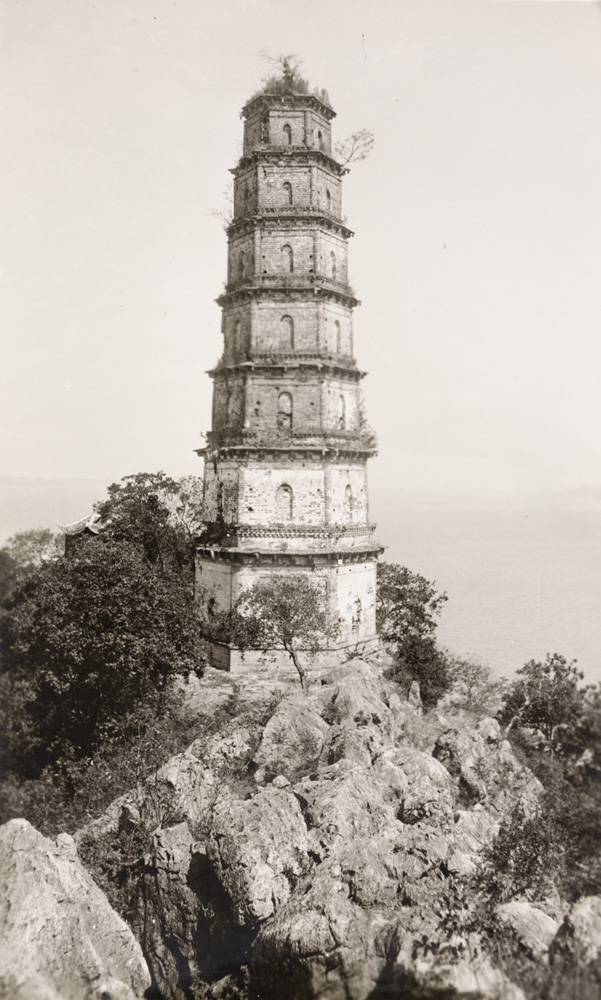
Photograph by Ernst Boerschmann. Source: the Stephan Loewentheil Collection

In 1906, Boerschmann began his first expedition with the financial support of the German Empire. He traveled to China as a scientific advisor to the German Foreign Office, who would continue to support his studies until the outbreak of World War I in 1914. On this trip he documented many Buddhist pagodas with cameras and drawings, which formed the material for his later publications.

In June 1912, the first major display of Boerschmann's photographic work was mounted at the Kunstgewerbemuseum Berlin.

After the First World War, Boerschmann was a lecturer on China in Königsberg (now Kaliningrad) from 1918 to 1921. He worked initially only in East Prussia, but was soon extended to the entire empire. Beginning in 1921 he worked in Berlin as a lecturer at Technische Hochschule Berlin, where he was named a Professor in 1927.

With the publication of three books of his photography of China in the 1920s – Baukunst und Landschaft (which was translated into French and English), Picturesque China, and Chinesische Architktur – Boerschmann became internationally well known, but as a photographer rather than a researcher. 1923's Picturesque China, which boasted a print-run of 20,000 copies in German alone and was published in two English versions (in London and New York), was to become his most successful book.

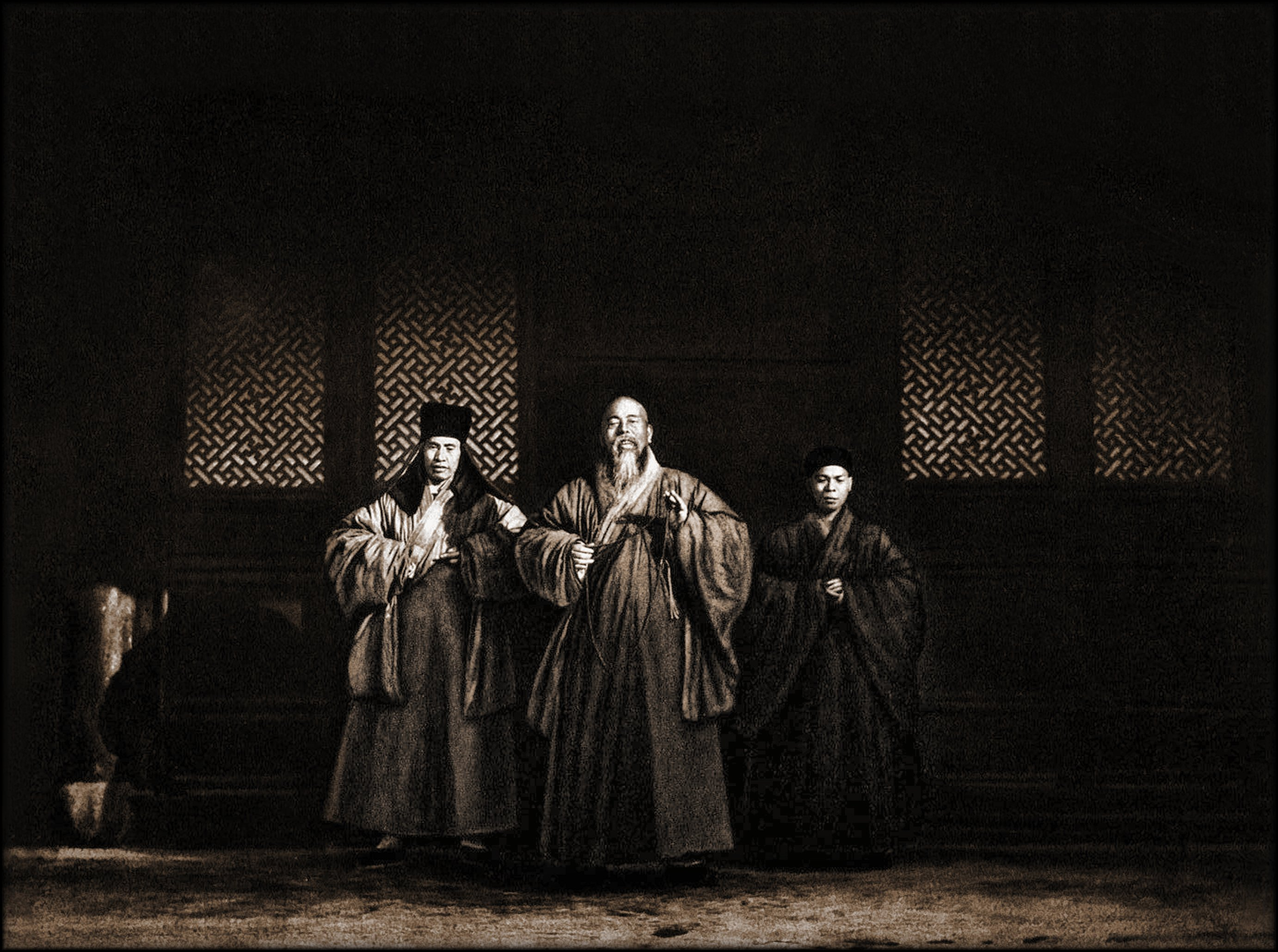
The Abbott of the Monastery, Tíen túng sze, Chekiang Province. c. 1906, Ernst Boerschmann

In 1931, Chinese architectural expert Zhu Qiqian (朱啓鈐) invited Boerschmann to join his newly-founded Society for Research in Chinese Architecture in Beijing as a corresponding member. From 1933 to 1937, Boerschmann embarked on his third trip to China. On this trip, he collected many documents, oral history accounts, photographs, building plans, and inscriptions. He returned to Germany in 1940 and became a lecturer at the University of Berlin on Chinese architecture. In 1943, his apartment was destroyed by WWII bombings.

In 1945, Boerschmann was promoted to Professor of Sinology at the Humboldt University of Berlin, and later held the same position at Hamburg University. He died in Bad Pyrmont, Hamelin-Pyrmont, Lower Saxony, on 30 April 1949.

== Legacy ==
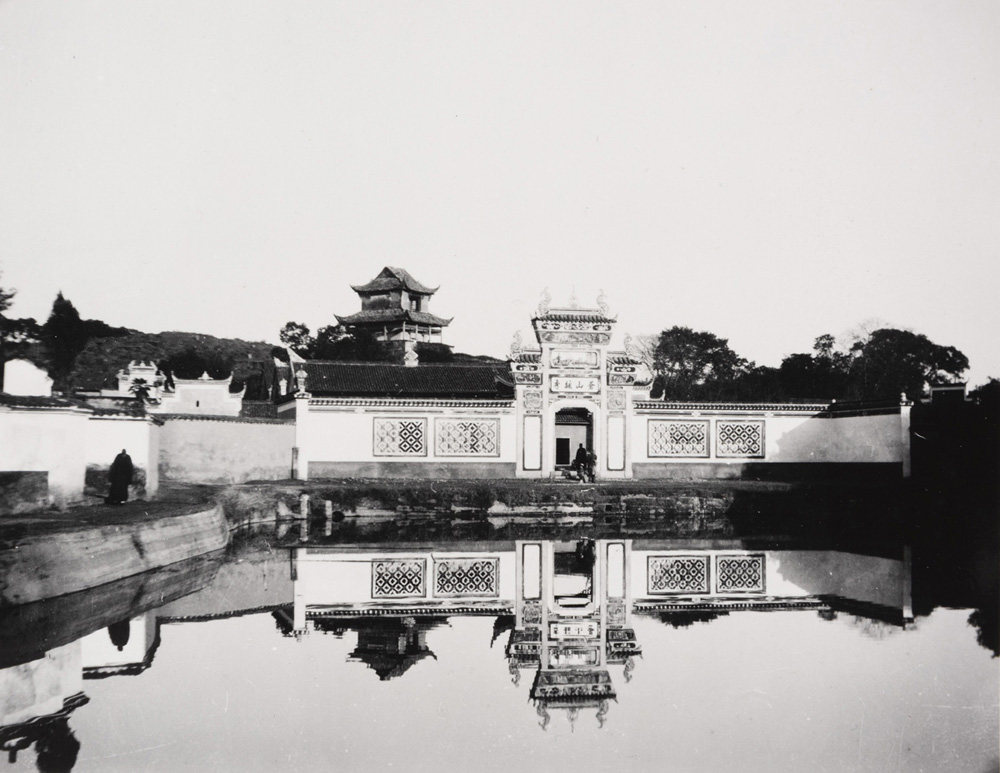
Photograph by Ernst Boerschmann. Source: the Stephan Loewentheil Collection

American rare book and photograph collector Stephan Loewentheil has amassed a notable archive of Boerschmann's work – one of the world's largest holdings of early Chinese architectural photographs. The Boerschmann holdings of the Stephan Loewentheil China Photography Collection include "thousands of photographs" (many of which were never published), texts, maps, illustrations, manuscripts, correspondences, and other objects.

Boerschmann's field observations in China, from meticulous architectural drawings to artful photographs, would set the standard for architectural historians of the region for decades to come. During his lifetime, Boerschmann was undoubtedly the leading expert on Chinese historical architecture in the German-speaking world, but the limitations of German as a language for research and publication made it difficult for international scholars to study his work in depth. In 2010, more than a century after his first trip to China, China Heritage Quarterly declared that Boerschmann "is gradually being recognized for his breadth of vision, the richness of the material he collected, and the serious intellectual underpinnings of his enterprise."

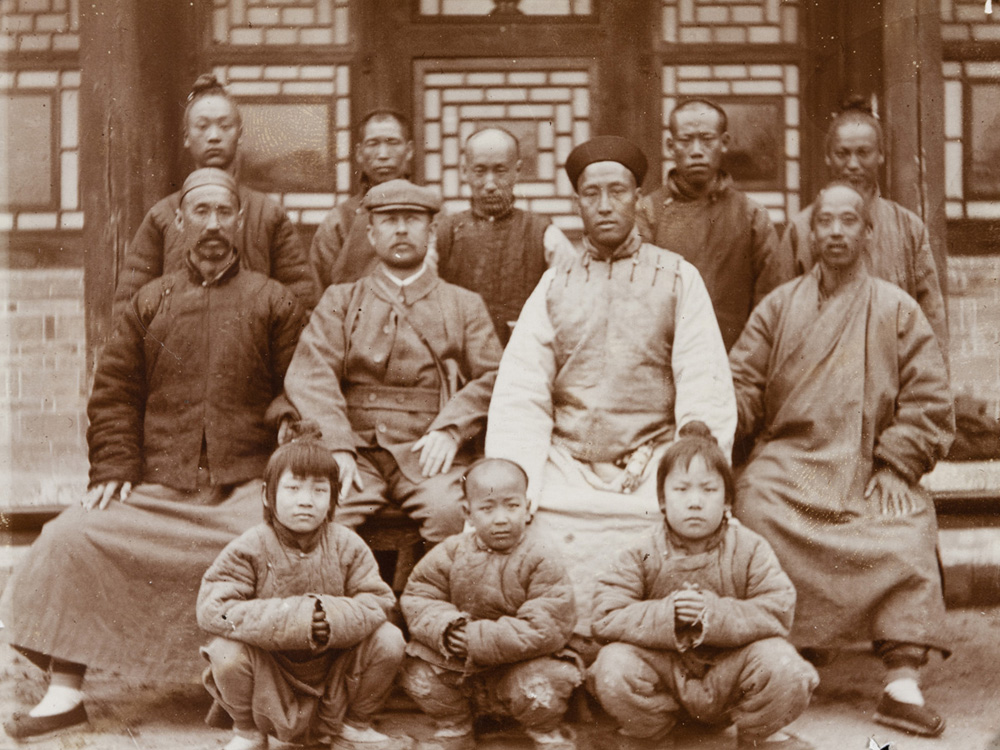
Photograph by Ernst Boerschmann. Source: the Stephan Loewentheil Collection

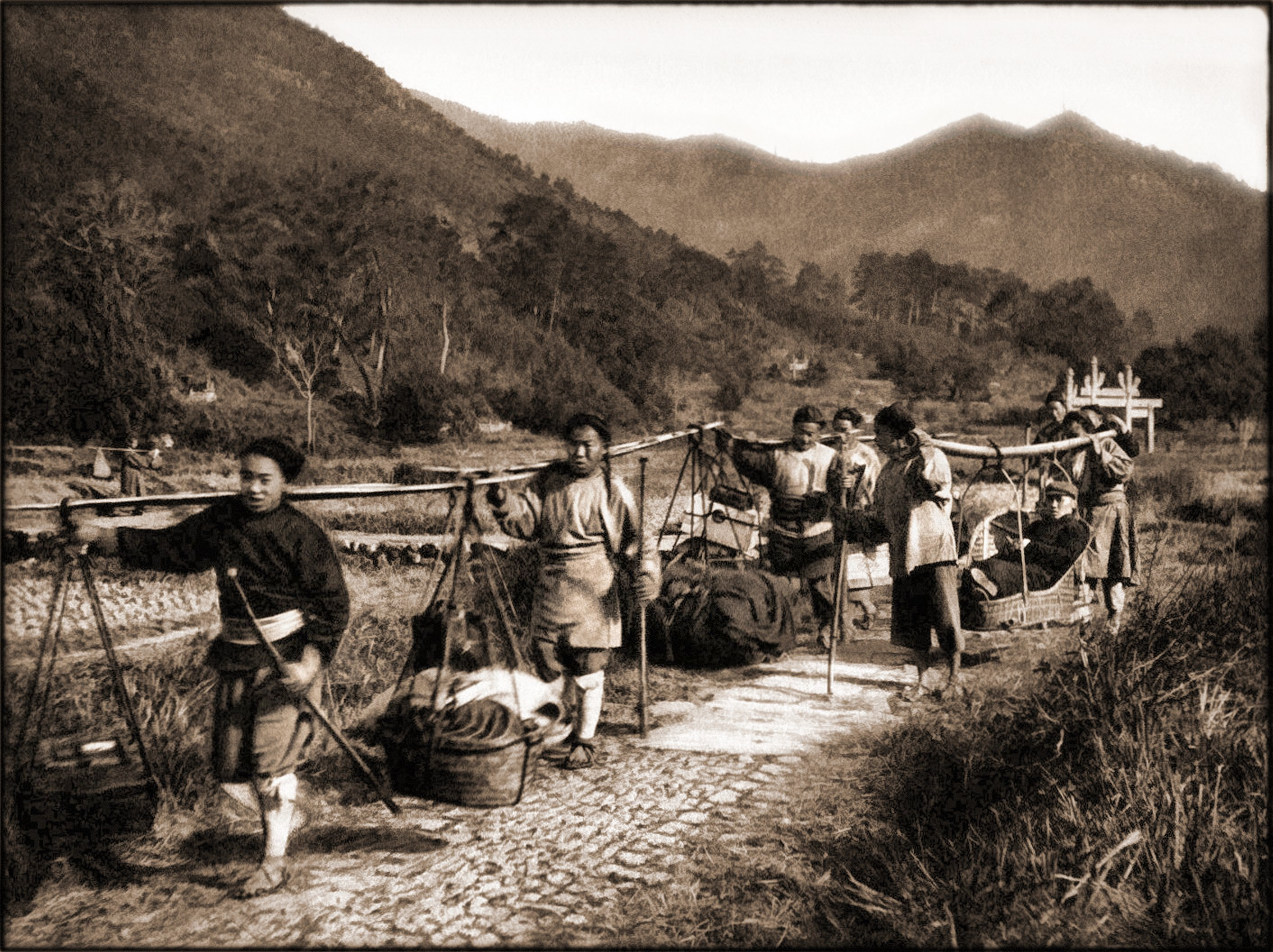
On The Journey to the Monastery of the Celestial Boy Near Ningpo, Ningpo-Tíen Túng Sze, Chekiang Province. c. 1906, Ernst Boerschmann

== Works ==
- The Architecture and Religious Culture of the Chinese, 1914
- Picturesque China, 1923
- Chinesische Architektur [Chinese Architecture] (in German). Berlin: Wasmuth Verlag. 1925.
- Baukunst und Landschaft in China. Eine Reise durch zwölf Provinzen (in German). Berlin: Wasmuth Verlag. 1926.

== Bibliography ==
- Neue Deutsche Biographie, ed. (1955). Boerschmann, Ernst Johann Robert [Boerschmann, Ernst Johann Robert] (in German). Berlin: Duncker & Humblot. p. 407. ISBN 3-428-00183-4.
- Fritz Jäger. Zeitschrift der Deutschen Morgenländischen Gesellschaft (ed.). Ernst Boerschmann (1873-1949) [Ernst Boerschmann (1873-1949)] (in German). pp. 150–156.
- Eduard Kögel (2015). The Grand Documentation: Ernst Boerschmann and Chinese Religious Architecture (1906-1931). Boston: Gruyter Berlin. ISBN 978-3-11-037494-0.
- Xu Yuan; Ernst Boerschmann (2017). 西洋镜：一个德国建筑师眼中的中国 （1906—1909） [China in the Eyes of a German Architect (1906-1909)] (in Chinese). Fuzhou, Fujian: Taihai Press. ISBN 978-7-5168-1237-2.
- Tsinghua University Art Museum; Lowenthill, eds. (2018). 世相与映像——洛文希尔摄影收藏中的19世纪中国 (in Chinese). Beijing: Tsinghua University Press. ISBN 978-7-302-51668-2.
- 洛文希尔中国摄影收藏
- 对中国建筑史有重要影响的德国摄影家：恩斯特·柏石曼《遗失的影像 早期德国来华摄影家
