= Ace (musical) =

American stage musical

ACE
- The New Musical Adventure
- Show logo
- Music: Richard Oberacker
- Lyrics: Robert Taylor and Richard Oberacker
- Book: Robert Taylor and Richard Oberacker
- Productions: 2006 Regional productions 2008 Signature Theatre

ACE is a musical with a book and lyrics by Robert Taylor and Richard Oberacker, and music by Oberacker. The story is about a boy, separated from his mother, who discovers his past and himself through a series of dreams about a flying ace. It was inspired by Robert Taylor's father training to be a pilot, and his mother having a near-fatal bout with depression.

The musical premiered The Repertory Theatre of St. Louis, Missouri, in 2006 and has played in several regional productions.

== Background and productions ==
Taylor and Oberacker met and began to discuss the show while touring in 2003 with The Lion King.

Parts of Ace were shown at the National Alliance for Musical Theatre's (NAMT) Festival of New Musicals in New York in September 2005. Cheyenne Jackson starred as Ace, with Christiane Noll featured.

The musical debuted at The Repertory Theatre of St. Louis, Missouri, from September 6 through October 1, 2006. It was directed by Stafford Arima and choreographed by Andrew Palermo. It then played at Playhouse in the Park in Cincinnati, Ohio, from October 17 through November 17, 2006. This production was also directed by Arima and choreographed by Palermo. Another production by the same team played at the Old Globe Theatre in San Diego, California from January 13 through February 18, 2007. The cast included Michael Arden as John Robert and Darren Ritchie as Ace.

The Signature Theatre in Arlington, Virginia production ran from August 26 through September 28, 2008. Directed by Eric D. Schaeffer and choreographed by Karma Camp, the cast featured Jill Paice, Emily Skinner, Jim Stanek, and Christiane Noll. In the Signature production, the boy Billy is renamed Danny, and the past is revealed through diaries rather than through dreams.

Taylor and Oberacker spent the next several years further revising the script, story, and orchestrations. Oberacker reported in interviews that this heavily altered show was finally the script they wanted. Of particular note, the main character Danny's age was changed from 10 to 21. This revised musical premiered as a fully staged concert production at the University of Nevada, Las Vegas' Judy Bayley Theater for a two-performance special event on August 22 and 23, 2015. It was directed by David H. Bell.

== Plot synopsis ==
Act I

In St. Louis, Missouri, in 1952, ten-year-old Danny Lucas telephones for help because his mother won't wake up. His mother, Elizabeth Lucas, has swallowed a bottle of sleeping pills and is taken to the psychiatric ward. The caseworker from social services, Mrs. Crandall, places an angry Danny in foster care ("It's Better This Way"). Mrs. Crandall informs Elizabeth that contact with Danny will be limited to gifts and letters. Elizabeth returns home determined to correct her past mistakes and get Danny back ("Fill In The Blank"). She writes to Danny asking him to follow her clues to their conclusion ("Letter From Elizabeth").

Danny's foster family is the Milligans, a childless couple awaiting a baby. Mrs. Crandall delivers, from Danny's mother, a model plane and instructions to speak with the elderly Harold Bixby. Through Mr. Bixby's remembrances, we are introduced to John Robert Anderson - a World War I fighter pilot ("In These Skies") who meets ("In This Moment") and falls in love with Ruth Whitlow ("In These Skies" (Reprise)).

At school, the troubled and angry Danny meets Emily. He tells Emily about the 'clues' from his mother. Emily enthusiastically offers to help him solve the mystery ("Now I'm On Your Case"). Mrs. Milligan struggles with baking Toll House cookies. She equates her success as a mother with successfully baking the cookies ("Make It From Scratch").

Elizabeth sends Danny the diaries of Ruth Whitlow. Through the diaries, we see that Ruth's relationship with John Robert Anderson leads to marriage ("Be My Bride"). John Robert is stationed in France. Ruth writes of her longing for him and her pride in his service ("Ruth's Letters"). John Robert challenges a hostile airman to abet and teaches him a lesson ("Anique's Tavern Song"). Another letter from Ruth reveals that she is pregnant ("I'm Going To Have This Child"). John Robert continues his service in France ("The Dogfight") and his life ends there ("Act I Finale").

Act II

Danny is learning to trust his foster parents, the Milligans ("Now I Know"). Another package arrives from his mother. Through Ruth's diaries, we meet her young son Charlie Anderson, nicknamed "Ace". She sings of her dream for her son to be the aviator and hero that his father was. Charlie dreams of becoming an aeronautical engineer ("Soaring Again"). Also in this package is a letter from Elizabeth and her yearbook from St. Louis University 1935, and a photo. Through these items, Elizabeth Lucas and Charlie "Ace" Anderson are shown as they meet ("It's Just A Matter Of Time"; "I Know It Can Be Done") and fall in love ("Missing Pieces"). The photo of Ace is the first time that Danny has seen his father; his mother has previously refused to speak about him ("So That's Him").

After the bombing of Pearl Harbor, Charlie, fueled by his mother's desires for him, joins the Air Force. Elizabeth opposes this but agrees to marry him before he leaves. While in training, Charlie feels the spirit of his father John Robert ("Father And Son"). Charlie is asked to join the "Flying Tigers" - a voluntary assignment. Elizabeth is furious that Charlie would put himself in danger for a voluntary mission. Charlie feels connected to the father he never knew and believes that he is making the best choice. Elizabeth, on the other hand, feels that the stories of John Robert's heroism have led Ace to make a bad choice. They argue and separate in anger.

Ace joins the Flying Tigers in China ("We're The Only Ones"). Ruth, Elizabeth, Ace, and Danny each consider the emotional changes they are experiencing. Elizabeth reveals that she is pregnant ("Seeing Thing In A Different Light"). Ace perishes in the skies over Siam. Elizabeth sings of her overwhelming shock, anger, and inability to forgive ("That's What It Should Say"). "Ace" speaks to Danny. He tells Danny that he can "Choose To Fly" in many ways, in his heart and mind, not necessarily or only in a plane.

Danny is reunited with his Mother. He understands his past and their relationship is healed ("Chose To Fly"; "Finale").

This summary is based on the 2008 Signature Theatre version of the musical.

== Characters and cast ==
Original Cast
- Billy - Noah Galvin
- Mrs. Crandall/Clara Whitlow - Traci Lyn Thomas
- Elizabeth - Jessica Boevers
- Louise - Amy Bodnar
- Emily - Gabrielle Boyadjian
- Edward/Stampley - Duke Lafoon
- Ace - Matt Bogart
- John Robert - Chris Peluso
- Ruth - Heather Ayers
- Lt. Sanders/Tim Sullivan - Richard Barth
- Colonel Whitlow/Chennault - James Judy
- Tennaman/Stein - Kevin Reed
- Cooper/Myron - Danny Rothman
- Teacher/Ensemble - Susan Kokot Stokes
- Nurse/Ensemble - Kelli Barrett
- Anique/Ensemble - Gabrielle Stravelli
- School Bully/Young Charlie - Jimmy McEvoy
2008 Cast at the Signature Theatre
- Danny - Dalton Harrod
- Mrs. Crandall/Clara Whitlow - Florence Lacey
- Elizabeth - Jill Paice
- Louise - Emily Skinner
- Emily - Angelina Kelly
- Edward/Stampley - Duke Lafoon
- Ace - Matthew Scott
- John Robert - Jim Stanek
- Ruth - Christiane Noll
- Lt. Sanders/Sullivan - Richard Barth
- Col.Whitlow/Chennault - George Dvorsky
- Tenneman - Jason Reiff
- Harold Bixby/Cooper/Myron - Danny Rothman
- Mrs.Gebert/Clara - Tracy Lynn Olivera
- Nurse/Librarian - Elizabeth Share
- Anique - Gabrielle Stravelli
- Sidekick - Brooke Bloomquist
- Young Charlie - Ari Goldbloom-Helzner
- Bully - William Beech
2015 Cast at UNLV's Judy Bayley Theatre
- Danny Lucas - Sam Cordes
- Ruth - Tina Walsh
- Ace - Devin Archer
- John Robert - Joey DeBenedetto
- Young Ruth - Niki Scalera
- Elizabeth - Nicole Kaplan

Supporting Cast:

- Bruce Ewing
- Jeff Leibow
- Nikka Wahl
- Lisa Louise Orchard
- Brian Miller
- Greg Kata
- Jesse Bourque
- Rochelle Collins
- Sydney Peca Story
- Gary Easton

== Musical numbers (2006-07) ==
- In These Skies
- Life Can Be Cruel
- It Took This Moment
- Make It From Scratch
- Be My Bride
- Letter From The Front
- The Dogfight
- Soaring Again
- It's Just A Matter Of Time
- I Know It Can Be Done
- Missing Pieces
- Sooner Or Later
- In These Skies (reprise)
- We're The Only Ones
- Seeing Things In A Different Light
- That's That It Should Say
- Finale Sequence

== Awards and nominations ==
ACE was nominated for twelve 2006 Kevin Kline Awards, winning six: Richard Oberacker and Robert Taylor, Outstanding New Play or Musical; Marie Anne Chimento, Outstanding Costume Design; Chris Akerlind, Outstanding Lighting Design; David Korins, Outstanding Set Design; John H. Shivers and David Patridge, Outstanding Sound Design; and Noah Galvin, Outstanding Lead Actor in a Musical. It also won the Mickey Kaplan New American Play prize.
