= Marie Anne Chiment =

American costume designer

- Born: United States
- Education: New York University’s Tisch School of the Arts (Master of Fine Arts, 1981)
- Occupation: costume designer
- Awards: Kevin Kline Awards; Judy Award

Marie Anne Chiment has created sets and costumes for hundreds of productions across the United States for opera, theatre and dance. Chiment’s sets and costumes have been used on the stages of Santa Fe Opera, Chicago Lyric Opera, Kennedy Center, Wolftrap Opera and Broadway’s Minskoff Theatre. She has designed national tours of Grease and Carousel, as well as the GLAMA award winning world premiere of Patience & Sarah for the Lincoln Center Festival.

== Education ==
Chiment received a Master of Fine Arts in 1981 from New York University’s Tisch School of the Arts. As the year’s top graduate she received the coveted J.S. Seidman Award for design excellence. An invitation to join United Scenic Artists was followed by design engagements for the operetta Land Of Smiles at Lincoln Center, the film Grease Monkey (winner, “Focus On Film” award) as well as A Midsummer Night's Dream for The Arena Stage in Washington DC, starring Kathleen Turner and Avery Brooks.

== Early career ==
Chiment designed costumes for theatre companies including Actors Theatre of Louisville, Philadelphia’s Walnut Street Theatre, Cincinnati Playhouse, Portland Stage Company, Berkeley Repertory Theatre, New York Citys La Mama and Beckett Theatres and Repertory Theatre of St. Louis. While designing for The Rep in St. Louis, she met Colin Graham, the Artistic Director of Opera Theatre of Saint Louis, and was invited to design sets and costumes for the premiere of his production Beauty And The Beast. The production was successful.

== Design ==
Chiment was classically trained in voice and music so she liked creating sets and costumes for opera and dance. She has designed operas for Seattle Opera, Spoleto Festival, Minnesota Opera, Pennsylvania Opera Theatre, Kentucky Opera, Virginia Opera, Nashville Opera, Memphis Opera, Sarasota Opera and Opera Pacific. Chimet has also created costumes for the New York Baroque Dance Company, Kathryn Posin Dance Company, Elizabeth Keen Dance Company, and Alvin Ailey American Dance Theater.

== Later career ==
Chiment went back to the West Coast to design The Winter's Tale and Rough Crossing for Oregon Shakespeare Festival. For the 2005 season Chiment designed the fantasy costumes for Festival's The Tragical History of Dr. Faustus. When OSF’s Associate Artistic Director Fontaine Syer moved east to assume the artistic directorship of Delaware Theatre Company, she invited Chiment to collaborate with her at DTC. Chiment was nominated for the Barrymore Award for Excellence in Theatre for her work at DTC. Chiment regularly designs sets and costumes for DTC productions. Chiment designed the costumes for the 2015 Mauckingbird Theatre Company's presentation of The Cole Porter Celebration 'Hot 'In Cole' in Philadelphia.

== Academic work and writings ==
Chiment has served as Associate Professor of Design at Webster University's Leigh Gerdine School of Fine Arts, Guest Lecturer at Cornell University, Guest Designer at Pennsylvania State University Festival of American Theatre and Guest Designer for the Santa Rosa Summer Repertory Theatre. Chiment’s work has appeared on the covers of Entertainment Design, Theatre Crafts International and Stage Directions magazines and her designs have been featured in Opera News, The Costume Designer’s Handbook and Fabric Painting and Dyeing for the Stage.

== Awards ==
At the second annual Kevin Kline Awards Chiment was awarded Outstanding Costume Design for her designs for the world premiere of the musical Ace for the Repertory Theatre of St. Louis in 2007. Later in 2014 Chiment was again nominated for the Barrymore Outstanding Costume Design for The Most Spectacularly Lamentable Trial of Miz Martha Washington, with the Flashpoint Theatre Company. "Her set and costume designs for Repertory Theatre of St. Louis's I Am My Own Wife won a Kevin Kline Award for outstanding production and were nominated for a Helen Hayes Award for outstanding design. Her set design for the Black Repertory Theatre's production of Macbeth won the Judy Award and was a Woodie King Award nominee."
