= Christiane Noll =

American actress and singer (born 1968)

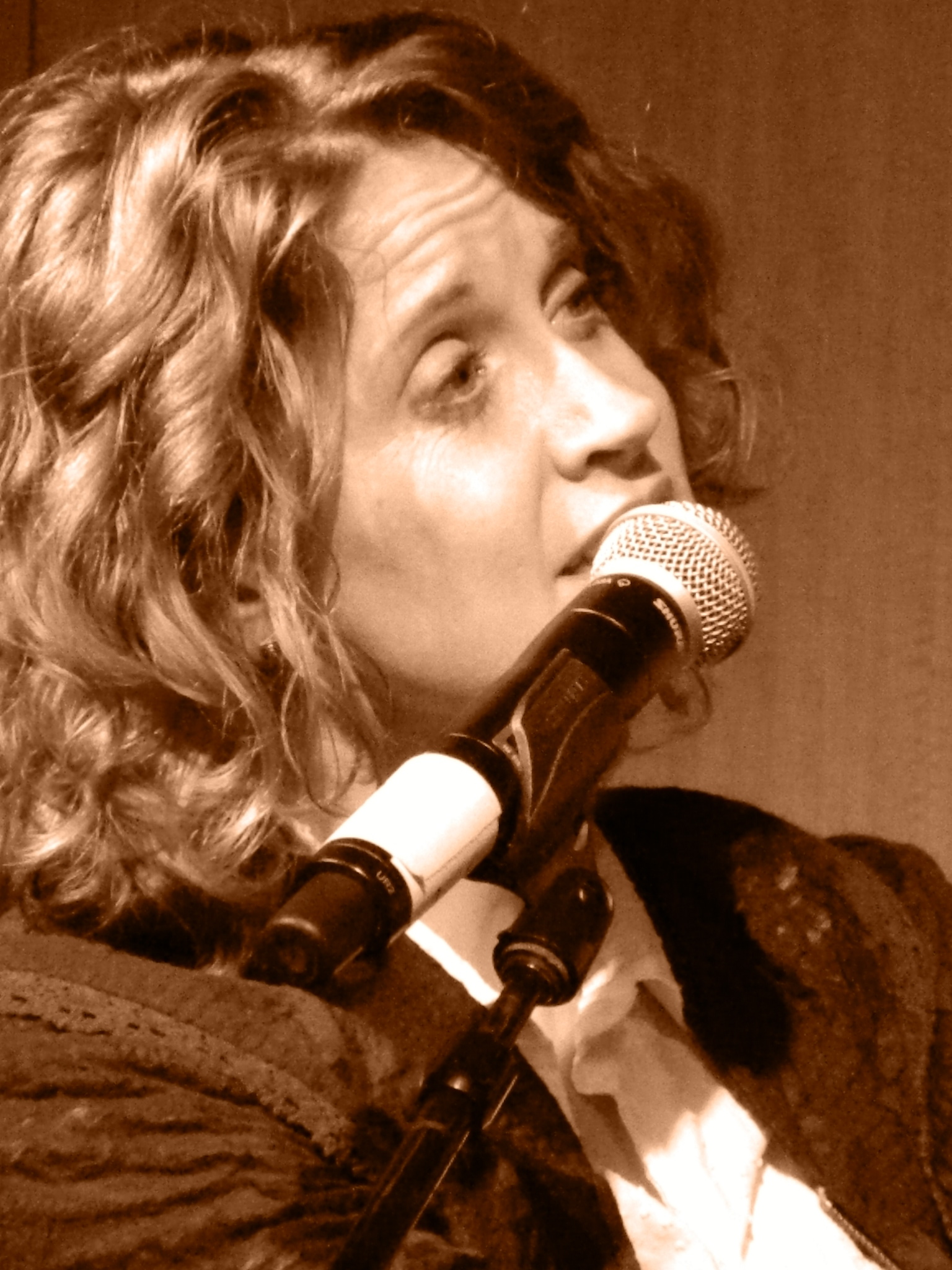
- Noll in 2013
- Born: October 5, 1968 (age 58); New York City, U.S.
- Education: Carnegie Mellon University
- Occupations: Actress, singer
- Years active: 1996–present

Christiane Noll (born October 5, 1968) is an American actress and singer known for her work in musicals and on the concert stage. She originated the role of Emma Carew in Frank Wildhorn's Jekyll & Hyde, and had roles in Urinetown and Dear Evan Hansen. For her role as Mother in the 2009 Broadway revival of Ragtime, she was nominated for the 2010 Tony Award for Best Actress in a Musical.

== Life and career ==
Noll was born in New York City and raised in Leonia, New Jersey, where she attended Leonia High School. She is the daughter of conductor and Emmy Award-winning Music Supervisor for CBS, the late Ron Noll, and soprano Sara-Ann Noll. She graduated from Carnegie Mellon University. In 2006, Noll married actor Jamie LaVerdiere, who appeared in the Broadway production of the musical The Pirate Queen in 2007. The couple's first child, a girl, was born in February 2009. Noll has established the Charlotte Black Memorial Fund as an endowed award at Carnegie Mellon University.

=== Stage work ===
Noll created the role of Emma in the Broadway production of Jekyll & Hyde in 1997 after playing the role in out-of-town tryouts. She also appeared on Broadway in the revue, It Ain't Nothin' but the Blues (1999). Noll earned good notices for her performances as Kathie in The Student Prince in 2000 at the Paper Mill Playhouse and Marianne in City Center Encores! The New Moon (2003). Noll received an Ovation Award for her role as Hope Cladwell in the National Tour of Urinetown (2004). She also created the roles of Vanna Vane in The Mambo Kings musical (2005), Jane Smart in the American premier of The Witches of Eastwick at the Signature Theatre in Arlington, Virginia (2007), Elizabeth Lavenza in the rock musical Frankenstein - A New Musical (2007 off-Broadway, 37 Arts) and Jordan in The Piper at the NY Music Theatre Festival (2007). Noll appeared as Ruth in 2008 in Ace at the Signature Theatre in Arlington. In 2010 Noll was seen on Broadway as Mother in the revival of Ragtime at the Neil Simon Theatre for which she was nominated for a Tony Award for Best Performance by a Leading Actress in a Musical.

Noll has starred in the national tours of Grease, as Sandy, Miss Saigon, as Ellen, and City of Angels, as Mallory/Avril, as well as a tour of Australia and Thailand as Nellie in South Pacific. She performed with Plácido Domingo in the Washington National Opera's The Merry Widow as Valencienne at The Kennedy Center (2005). Other stage credits include Mabel in Mack & Mabel (for which she won a 2004 Connecticut Critics Circle Award), Genvieve in The Baker's Wife (2002), Lizzie in Lizzie Borden (2001 at Goodspeed Opera House), The Baker's Wife in Into the Woods (2005), Carrie in Carousel, Laura in A Fine & Private Place, (2006 off-Broadway York Theater), Woman 2 in Little by Little, (1999 off-Broadway York Theater), and Mabel in Eugene Opera's The Pirates of Penzance (2006). Regional theatre productions include Oliver!, All Night Strut, Cinderella, Annie, 42nd Street, My Fair Lady, Sweeney Todd, and Little Shop of Horrors (American Music Theatre of San Jose (2008)). She played Mother in Ragtime at the Kennedy Center (2009) winning a 2010 Helen Hayes Award for Best Actress in a Musical.

Noll was part of the first national touring company for Dear Evan Hansen, playing the role of Cynthia Murphy. She later took over the same role in the Broadway company in October 2019, and resumed (along with the rest of the company) in December 2021 after the COVID-19 Broadway hiatus. Her run in the show ended on July 17, 2022, but she returned to cover the role in the beginning of September 2022 when Ann Sanders fell ill.

Noll is heard on concept albums for a new musical, The New Picasso, which was released in January 2008, and Dracula, released in 2006.

=== Concert, cabaret and recording work ===
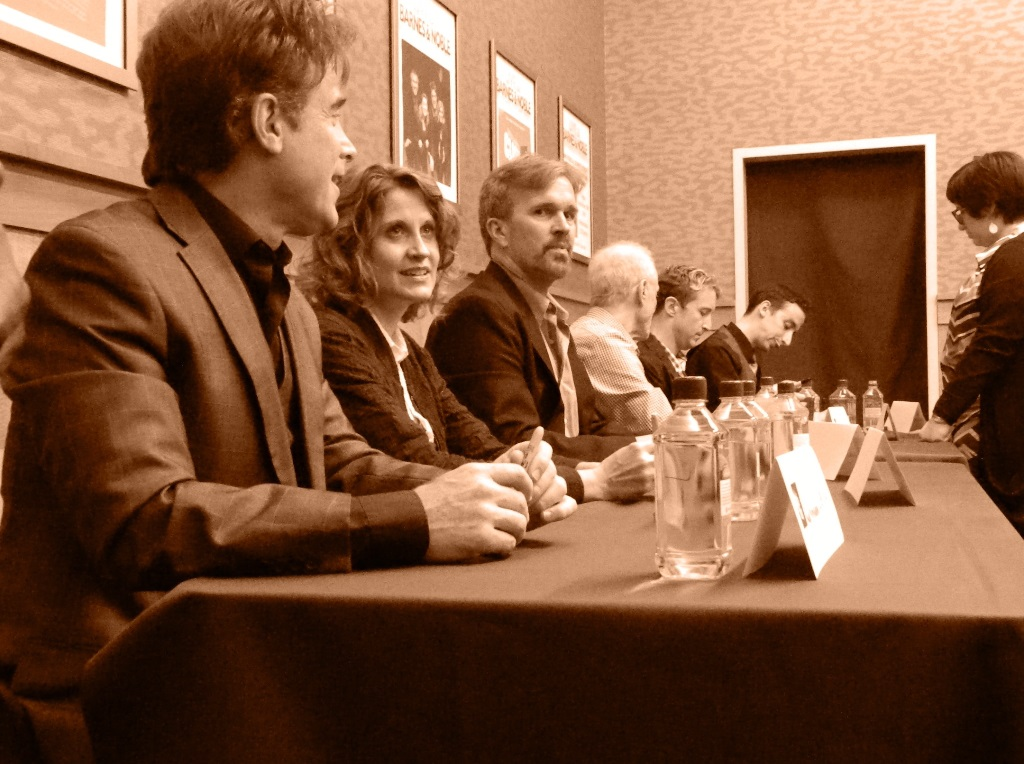
Sal Viviano, Noll, George Dvorsky, David Shire, Andrew Gerle and Danny Weller (left to right) in New York, 2013.

Noll frequently performs Broadway favorites in concert and has been a guest soloist as part of Bravo Broadway with the National Symphony and Marvin Hamlisch, The Cincinnati Pops, The Columbus Symphony Orchestra, The Jerusalem Symphony, The Philadelphia Pops and Peter Nero, and has sung with The Cleveland Orchestra, the Detroit Symphony, the Alabama Symphony Orchestra, The Harrisburg Symphony, The San Francisco Symphony, and the Sinfonica Brasileira in Rio de Janeiro, Brazil. She made her Carnegie Hall debut with Skitch Henderson, in his last New York Pops performance, as part of 3 Broadway Divas.

Noll also performs a solo cabaret show and has been a featured member of the Broadway Inspirational Voices Gospel Choir.

Noll appeared as Sister Margaretta in the 2013 NBC broadcast of The Sound of Music Live!.

Noll has released four solo CDs, Christiane Noll - A Broadway Love Story (1998), The Ira Gershwin Album (2001), Live at the Westbank Café (2003) and Christiane Noll - My Personal Property (2008). She supplied the singing-voice of Anna in the Warner Bros. animated feature The King and I (1999). Some of her numerous recordings are Jekyll & Hyde (1997), The King & I (1999, Sony Classics), Little by Little (1999), A Christmas Survival Guide (2000), What's a Nice Girl Like You..., Z: The Masked Musical (2000), Bravo Broadway 2, The Three Broadway Divas (with two fellow Divas - Jan Horvath and Debbie Gravitte), Far from the Madding Crowd (2000), The New Moon (2003), Neo: A Celebration of Emerging Talent in Musical Theatre, Benefiting the York Theatre Company (2005), and albums of the music of Stephen Sondheim, Burt Bacharach, Paul Simon, Scott Alan and Stephen Schwartz, among others.

== Stage credits ==
Year	Title	Role	Venue	Ref.
1989	My Fair Lady	Ensemble	Regional, Pittsburgh CLO	
1989	Annie	Ensemble	Regional, Pittsburgh CLO	
1990	Cinderella	Ensemble	Regional, Pittsburgh CLO	
1990	The Student Prince	Ensemble	Regional, Pittsburgh CLO	
1990	42nd Street	Ensemble	Regional, Pittsburgh CLO	
1990	Sweeney Todd: The Demon Barber of Fleet Street	Ensemble	Regional, Pittsburgh CLO	
1990	Oliver!	Nancy	Regional, Carousel Dinner Theater	
1991-1992	City of Angels	Make-up Artist/Bootsie	U.S. National Tour	
1992	Miss Saigon	Ellen	U.S. National Tour	
1994	Grease	Sandy Dumbrowski	Regional, Crouse-Hinds Concert Theater	
1994	Grease	Sandy Dumbrowski	Regional, CIBC Theatre	
1995	Out Of This World	Performer	New York City Center Encores!	
1995	Jekyll & Hyde	Emma Carew	Regional, Music Hall at Fair Park	
1996	Jekyll & Hyde	Emma Carew	Regional, Morris A. Mechanic Theatre	
1997	Jekyll & Hyde	Emma Carew	Broadway, Plymouth Theatre	
1999	It Ain't Nothin' but the Blues	Performer	Broadway, Vivian Beaumont Theatre	
1999	It Ain't Nothin' but the Blues	Performer	Broadway, Ambassador Theatre	
2000	The Student Prince	Kathie	Regional, Paper Mill Playhouse	
2001	Carousel	Carrie Pipperidge	Regional, Paper Mill Playhouse	
2001	Lizzie: The Musical	Lizzie Borden	Regional, Goodspeed Musicals	
2002	Call the Children Home	Kathleen	Off-Broadway, Primary Stages	
2002	The Baker's Wife	Genevieve	Regional, Goodspeed Musicals	
2003	The New Moon	Performer	New York City Center Encores!	
2003	Urinetown	Hope Cladwell	U.S. National Tour	
2004	Mack & Mabel	Mabel Normand	Regional, Goodspeed Musicals	
2005	The Mambo Kings	Vanna Vane	Regional, Golden Gate Theatre	
2005	Into the Woods	The Baker's Wife	Los Angeles, TheatreWorks (Silicon Valley)	
2007	The Witches of Eastwick	Jane Smart	Regional, Signature Theatre	
2007	Frankenstein	Elizabeth Lavenza	Off-Broadway, 37 Arts Theatre A	
2008	Little Shop of Horrors	Audrey	Regional, American Musical Theatre of San Jose	
2008	Ace	Ruth	Regional, Signature Theatre	
2009	Ragtime	Mother	Washington D.C., Kennedy Center	
2009	Ragtime	Mother	Broadway, Neil Simon Theatre	
2012	Closer Than Ever	Performer	Off-Broadway, York Theatre Company	
2012	Chaplin the Musical	Hannah Chaplin	Broadway, Ethel Barrymore Theatre	
2013	The King and I	Anna Leonowens	Regional, Broadway at Music Circus	
2014	1776	Abigail Adams	Regional, The Cape Playhouse	
2015	Kid Victory	Eileen	Regional, Signature Theatre	
2015	The Cottage	Marjorie	Regional, The John W. Engeman Theater at Northport	
2015	Elf	Emily Hobbs	U.S. National Tour	
2016	1776	Abigail Adams	Off-Broadway, New York City Center Encores!	
2016	Follies	Sally Durant Plummer	Regional, The Repertory Theatre of St. Louis	
2017	Next to Normal	Diana	Regional, TheaterWorks Hartford	
2017	Beauty and the Beast	Mrs. Potts	Regional, North Shore Music Theatre	
2018	Snow Child	Mabel	Washington D.C., Arena Stage	
2018	Dear Evan Hansen	Cynthia Murphy	U.S. National Tour	
2019	Dear Evan Hansen	Cynthia Murphy	Broadway, Music Box Theatre	
2022	Fun Home	Helen	Regional, TheaterWorks Hartford	
2023	God of Carnage	Veronica Novak	Off-Broadway, Theatre Row	
2023	Partnership	Lady Smith-Carr-Smith	Off-Broadway, Mint Theater Company	
2025-2026	The Sound of Music	Mother Abbess	U.S. National Tour	

== Discography ==
- Jekyll & Hyde (1997)
- Christiane Noll - A Broadway Love Story (1998)
- The King and I (1999)
- Little by Little (1999)
- A Christmas Survival Guide (2000)
- Far from the Madding Crowd (2000)
- Z: The Masked Musical (2000)
- The Ira Gershwin Album (2001)
- Live at the Westbank Café (2003)
- The New Moon (2003)
- Neo: A Celebration of Emerging Talent in Musical Theatre, Benefiting the York Theatre Company (2005)
- Christiane Noll - My Personal Property (2008)
- Frankenstein - A New Musical (2008)
- What I Wanna Be When I Grow Up by Scott Alan (2010) -- sings the song I Remember
- Scott Alan - Live (2012) -- sings the song Again

== Awards and nominations ==
Year	Award	Category	Work	Result	Ref.
2009	Helen Hayes Award	Outstanding Supporting Actress, Resident Musical	Ace	Nominated	
2010	Helen Hayes Award	Outstanding Lead Actress, Resident Musical	Ragtime	Won	
2010	Tony Award	Best Actress in a Musical	Ragtime	Nominated	
2010	Drama Desk Award	Outstanding Actress in a Musical	Ragtime	Nominated	
2013	Drama Desk Award	Outstanding Featured Actress in a Musical	Chaplin	Nominated	
