= Richard Oberacker =

American composer

- Occupations: Composer, conductor
- Notable work: Bandstand

Richard Oberacker is an American composer, lyricist, conductor, and playwright best known for composing and co-writing the musical Bandstand with writing partner Robert Taylor. He also conducts for Cirque du Soleil's Kà and has worked on other Cirque du Soleil shows including Dralion and Worlds Away.

== Shows ==
- Ace
- Bandstand
- Dracula

== Awards ==
Year	Award	Category	Show	Result
2003	Helen Hayes Awards	The Charles MacArthur Award for Outstanding New Musical	The Gospel According to Fishman	Nominated
2007	Kevin Kline Awards	Outstanding New Play or Musical	Ace	Won
2017	Drama Desk Awards	Outstanding Music	Bandstand	Nominated
2017	Drama Desk Awards	Outstanding Book of a Musical	Bandstand	Nominated
