= Lestat (musical) =

2005 Broadway musical based on the novels by Anne Rice

- Opening night Playbill cover
- Music: Elton John
- Lyrics: Bernie Taupin
- Book: Linda Woolverton
- Basis: The Vampire Chronicles by Anne Rice
- Premiere: December 17, 2005: Curran Theatre, San Francisco
- Productions: 2005 San Francisco; 2006 Broadway

Lestat is a Broadway musical inspired by Anne Rice's The Vampire Chronicles. The score is by Elton John and Bernie Taupin, with the book by Linda Woolverton. The musical had a brief run on Broadway in 2006.

== Production history ==
The musical had a reading in November 2003, with the title The Vampire Lestat. The reading cast featured James Barbour as Lestat, Jack Noseworthy, Steve Blanchard and Max Von Essen.

Lestat premiered in pre-Broadway tryouts at the Curran Theatre, San Francisco, California on December 17, 2005 and closed on January 29, 2006. The musical transferred to Broadway and opened at the Palace Theater on March 25, 2006 and closed on May 28, 2006, after 33 previews and 39 performances. The musical was directed by Robert Jess Roth with musical staging by Matt West. Scenic design was by Derek McLane, costume design by Susan Hilferty, lighting design by Kenneth Posner, sound design by Jonathan Deans, visual concept design by Dave McKean, and hair design by Tom Watson. The title role of Lestat was played by Hugh Panaro, and the cast starred Carolee Carmello as Gabrielle, Drew Sarich as Armand, Jim Stanek as Louis, Roderick Hill as Nicolas, Michael Genet as Marius, and Allison Fischer as Claudia. The choreographer Jonathan Butterell was added to the Broadway creative team "to give his perspective on the staging."

Elton John explained that he had written two new songs for the Broadway production: "Right Before My Eyes" and "My Beautiful Boy," for Lestat's mother, Carolee Carmello. He also noted that "The storyline has certainly changed in Lestat." An additional change is that "Lestat typing his memoirs into a laptop, with super titles being shown to the audience, has been abandoned since San Francisco." The CurtainUp reviewer noted: "Press reports from out-of-town about songs, characters, scenes and performers being dropped and/or replaced indicated that there was plenty of work to do on this particular incarnation."

== Synopsis ==
This synopsis reflects the final, New York version.

Act I

Lestat leaves his mother Gabrielle to go to Paris to live with his boyfriend Nicolas ("My Beautiful Boy"). He finds Nicolas working as an actor in a small theater, happy with his life ("In Paris"). They go to Nicolas' flat and it becomes clear they're in love with each other ("The Bugs and the Bears"). A vampire called Magnus attacks Lestat and turns him into a vampire ("The Thirst"). He struggles with this, and hides from his mother when she comes looking for him ("Right Before My Eyes"). Eventually he finds her and makes her a vampire to save her life, as she is sick ("Make Me As You Are"). They meet a vampire named Armand, who leads a group of satanist vampires. He denounces them as blasphemers, but Lestat reveals to his followers that they do not actually serve the Devil ("The Dark Laws / To Live Like This"). They decide to become a troupe of actors. Nicolas is discovered among them, and Lestat eventually transforms him too. The troupe's first play tells the story of Armand and Marius, his maker ("Morality Play"). Nicolas is in a catatonic state after his transformation, and Lestat decides to find Marius to heal him. Ten years pass. Gabrielle decides to leave Lestat and see the world ("Crimson Kiss"). Nicolas speaks for the first time, asking to be released. Lestat lights a fire to kill him, and scatters the ashes ("Right Before My Eyes" (reprise)) as Marius appears.

Act II

Marius claims that he could not have saved Nicolas. He encourages Lestat to go to America. Once there, he meets and falls for a young self-destructive Creole, Louis ("Welcome to The New World"). Louis agrees to let Lestat make him a vampire. They live together for a time, but Louis becomes dissatisfied with the vampiric life ("Embrace It"). Lestat transforms Claudia, an orphan girl, which horrifies Louis, who nevertheless agrees to help raise her. Time passes. Claudia has a greater craving for blood, having been transformed at a young age ("I Want More"). She mourns the fact that she will stay a child forever ("I'll Never Have That Chance"). Lestat apologizes, and she tries to kill him. Louis burns down the house. Later, on a ship, Lestat is wounded and thinks of what his life has become ("Sail Me Away"). He returns to Armand and the theater, where he discovers Louis and Claudia as members of the troupe. Armand and the others kill Claudia for trying to kill Lestat despite his protests ("To Kill Your Kind"). Louis leaves ("Embrace It" (reprise)). Armand mocks Lestat when he asks why he killed Claudia ("After All This Time"). They argue about what Marius said, and Lestat is thrown from the roof, breaking his legs. He prepares to die in the coming sunlight ("Sail Me Away" (reprise)), but Marius and Gabrielle arrive and convince him to save himself ("Crimson Kiss" (reprise)). The light goes off. Lestat appears, dressed in modern clothes, and says "I am the Vampire Lestat, and I will live forever."

== Casting ==
Character	Original San Francisco cast	Original Broadway cast
Lestat	Hugh Panaro	Hugh Panaro
Gabrielle	Carolee Carmello	Carolee Carmello
Claudia	Allison Fischer	Allison Fischer
Nicolas	Roderick Hill	Roderick Hill
Armand	Jack Noseworthy (Note: Jack Noseworthy was replaced by his understudy, Drew Sarich, about a week into the production. Sarich took over the part permanently and later made his Broadway debut as Armand.)	Drew Sarich
Louis	Jim Stanek	Jim Stanek
Marius	Michael Genet	Michael Genet

== Main roles ==
- Lestat (tenor) – The protagonist, a young Frenchman whose life we follow as he attempts to make his way in the world after unwillingly becoming a vampire. Lively and confident, though also sometimes selfish, but with the best of intentions.
- Gabrielle (mezzo-soprano) – Lestat's mother, who urges him to leave home and make a life in Paris. She later becomes his first fledgling and companion. Strong and free-spirited.
- Nicolas (baritone) – An actor and violinist in Paris who is Lestat's dear friend (and love-interest). He is pure and good-natured.
- Armand (tenor) – The leader of the underground coven in Paris later to become the Theater of the Vampires, who desires revenge against Lestat for breaking up his coven. Vindictive and manipulative.
- Louis (tenor/baritone) – A depressed plantation owner in New Orleans who becomes Lestat's somewhat unwilling companion in the New World. As a vampire, he is tormented by his conscience. Often quiet and melancholy.
- Claudia (soprano) – An orphan child made into a vampire by Lestat, in order to keep Louis from leaving him. She harbors anger towards Lestat for robbing her of her mortal future. Begins as a demanding young girl, but over time develops a grown woman's mind.

Other roles

- Marius – "The Ancient One", the oldest of the vampires. Wise but eccentric.
- Magnus – Lestat's maker, who goes into the fire shortly after choosing his heir.
- Laurent – A vampire of the Theater.

Ensemble: Vampires of Armand's coven/the Theater of the Vampires, Parisians, people of New Orleans.

== Reception ==
Reviews of the Broadway production were uniformly negative. The New York Post's verdict was "Bloody Awful", and the Newark Star-Ledger opined that it was "just deadly." Lamenting the show's "soporific" nature, Ben Brantley of The New York Times wrote: "Joining the ranks of Ambien, Lunesta, Sonata and other prescription lullaby drugs is Lestat, the musical sleeping pill...Dare to look upon Lestat and keep your eyelids from growing heavier and heavier and heavier." Brantley also characterized the play's songs as "pulpy and mostly interchangeable". Washington Post critic Peter Marks mused that "Lestat's contribution to art and equality is demonstrating that a gay vampire with a two-octave range can be just as dull as a straight one."

== Songs ==
Sources: Internet Broadway database; CurtainUp

Act I

- "From the Dead" – Lestat
- "Beautiful Boy" – Gabrielle
- "In Paris" – Nicolas, Lestat
- "Nicolas' Song" – Nicolas
- "The Thirst" – Lestat
- "Right Before My Eyes" – Lestat
- "Make Me As You Are" – Gabrielle, Lestat
- "To Live Like This" – Armand, Lestat, Ensemble (vampires)
- "Morality Play" – Laurent, Armand, Ensemble (vampires)
- "The Crimson Kiss" – Gabrielle
- "Right Before My Eyes" (Reprise) – Lestat

Act II

- "Welcome to the New World" – Ensemble (New Orleans residents)
- "Embrace It" – Louis, Lestat
- "I Want More" – Claudia
- "I'll Never Have That Chance" – Claudia
- "Sail Me Away" – Lestat
- "To Kill Your Kind" – Armand, Ensemble (vampires)
- "Embrace It" (Reprise) – Louis
- "After All This Time" – Armand
- "Sail Me Away" (Reprise) – Lestat
- "The Crimson Kiss" (Reprise)/Finale – Gabrielle, Lestat

== Recordings ==
The Original Broadway Cast Recording was recorded by Mercury Records on May 22, 2006 and was produced by Guy Babylon and Matt Still. After the show's closing however, Elton John's management stated "there are no plans to release the recording at the present."

== Awards and nominations ==
=== Original Broadway production ===
Year	Award	Category	Nominee	Result
2006	Tony Award	Best Performance by a Featured Actress in a Musical	Carolee Carmello	Nominated
2006	Tony Award	Best Costume Design of a Musical	Susan Hilferty	Nominated
2006	Drama Desk Award	Outstanding Featured Actress in a Musical	Carolee Carmello	Nominated
2006	Outer Critics Circle Award	Outstanding Actor in a Musical	Hugh Panaro	Nominated
