= Christopher Bentivegna =

American musician

- Born: Christopher Matthew Bentivegna; Darby, Pennsylvania, U.S.
- Occupation(s): Actor, singer, director

Christopher Matthew Bentivegna is an American singer, actor and theatre director born in Pennsylvania. He has performed in and directed many theatrical productions in New Jersey, New York. and Louisiana. Since 2003, he has lived in New Orleans, Louisiana where he continues his professional acting, singing, and directing career.

== Background ==
Christopher Matthew Bentivegna was born in Darby, Pennsylvania (a suburb of Philadelphia). He was raised in Southern New Jersey. He attended Pinelands Regional High School and graduated in 1990 after having won the New Jersey State Governor's Award for excellence in classical music.

In 1994, he received a degree in vocal performance from the Peabody Conservatory of Music, part of Johns Hopkins University in Baltimore, Maryland. He moved to northern New Jersey where he divided his time between working in the social services field and being an actor.

Some of his acclaimed performances in New Jersey include roles in Mame, The Secret Garden, Forever Plaid, Chess, Tommy, Into the Woods, Falsettos, and Evita. In workshop performances, Bentivegna originated the role of 'The Creature' in what would later become the off-Broadway production of Frankenstein - A New Musical, which is a musicalization of the Mary Shelley novel.^{1}

Bentivegna's diversity as an actor served him well during his stint with New York's Mac Haydn theater playing featured roles in Camelot, Kiss Me, Kate, Victor/Victoria, Li'l Abner, and Evita as Magaldi. His highly acclaimed role of Judas in Andrew Lloyd Webber's Jesus Christ Superstar showcased his tenor range by allowing him to "sing the heck" out of the role.^{2} Bentivegna continued playing the role of Judas in two more productions in New Orleans.

== Moving to New Orleans ==
Following his stint at Mac Haydn, Bentivegna moved to New Orleans where his acting/singing career continued with lead roles at the Southern Rep theater in The All Night Strut, the New Orleans premiere of Urinetown: The Musical, and in the New Orleans premiere of the off-Broadway hit The Musical of Musicals, The Musical which starred original off-Broadway cast member Craig Fols.^{4}

Bentivegna's performances have been hailed by critics for his energy and for his strong tenor voice.^{5} The Times-Picayune noted that Bentivegna was one of the best voices in New Orleans, and one of the most promising New Orleans theater newcomers in 2006.^{6}

Bentivegna played the role of Collins at Le Petit Theatre (New Orleans) in one of the first post-Broadway productions of Rent, starring opposite Bianca Del Rio, winner of RuPaul's Drag Race, who played the role of Angel.

Bentivegna has directed the New Orleans premieres of Evil Dead: The Musical, Zanna, Don't!, and Musical of the Living Dead. In December 2014, he directed the original musical A Christmassacre Story starring two-time Tony award-winning actor Michael Cerveris. In August 2015, Bentivegna directed the world premiere of the stage-play version of Flowers in the Attic, written by Andrew Neiderman, and edited by Bentivegna, based on the best-selling novel by V.C. Andrews, to critical acclaim. In November 2015, Bentivegna's production of Terminator: The Musical received its world premiere in New Orleans. In August, 2016, Bentivegna produced and directed the Louisiana premiere of the musical Lizzie; a rock musical based on the life of alleged axe murderess Lizzie Borden, winning the New Orleans Big Easy Award for Best Director of a Musical. In New Orleans, Bentivegna has also directed the regional premieres of The Toxic Avenger and Triassic Parq, a musical retelling of Jurassic Park told from the dinosaurs’ point of view. Other directorial credits include The 25th Annual Putnam County Spelling Bee, The Lion in Winter, A New Brain, The Wiz, and Dreamgirls. In 2017 Bentivegna won the Big Easy Award for New Orleans' Theatre Person of the Year. In 2020, he won a second Best Director of a Musical Big Easy Award for Cabaret, also winning Best Choreographer of a Musical for that production.
