= Ronald Noll =

American conductor (1929–2008)

Ronald W. Noll (November 11, 1929, Reading, Pennsylvania – January 15, 2008, Teaneck, New Jersey) was an American conductor, music director, and television music supervisor. Noll held degrees from Franklin & Marshall College, the Juilliard School, the Eastman School of Music, and Columbia University. His daughter is the actress-singer Christiane Noll.

From 1959 to 1991 he worked as the music supervisor and manager of the CBS Music Library. During his time there, he provided music for all CBS-TV shows originating in New York City and was awarded Emmy, Clio and Peabody Awards. For more than five decades, during his spare time, Noll was the conductor and, for some period, the artistic director, of Manhattan's Village Light Opera Group, a community theatre group that performs Gilbert and Sullivan, operettas and musicals. Opera News described him as an "authoritative interpreter of American operetta and the works of Gilbert and Sullivan".

He died on January 15, 2008, at the age of 78.
