= Allison Fischer =

American singer and actress

- Born: October 19, 1988 (age 38); Northern New Jersey, U.S.
- Occupations: Singer; Actress
- Years active: 2000–present
- Notable work: A Christmas Carol; Lestat; Grease

Allison Fischer (born October 19, 1988) is an American singer and actress.

== Life and career ==
Originally from northern New Jersey, Fischer had her first professional performance in the Off-Broadway musical King Island Christmas in 2000. Also in 2000, Fischer performed on Broadway at Madison Square Garden as Grace Smythe in A Christmas Carol, alongside Frank Langella and Tim Curry.

She played Lady Jane in the Off-Broadway musical version of The Prince and the Pauper from 2002 to 2003, and briefly performed at Playwrights Horizon in January 2003 in Jeanine Tesori's musical, Violet.

In 2004, she was an understudy in the off-Broadway show Children's Letters to God. The musical opened at the Lamb's Theatre on June 30, 2004, and closed on January 2, 2005.

The next year, Fischer starred in the musical Lestat, playing Claudia in the Elton John and Bernie Taupin musical. Fischer went on to play the role of Patty Simcox in the 2007 revival of Grease at the Brooks Atkinson Theatre. She performed from its opening on August 19, 2007, until it closed on January 4, 2009. Fischer also played Patty Simcox in the Broadway National Tour of Grease. Since then, Fischer has been part of Yale's Musical Theatre Festival with the new musical "The Profit of Creation," sang back-up for Florence and The Machine, and was a part of several upcoming indie films.

On television, Fischer played the role of Megan on the now defunct soap opera, Guiding Light.
