= Bandstand (musical) =

- The New American Musical
- Music: Richard Oberacker
- Lyrics: Richard Oberacker; Robert Taylor
- Book: Richard Oberacker; Robert Taylor
- Setting: Cleveland and New York City, August to December 1945
- Premiere: October 8, 2015: Paper Mill Playhouse; Millburn, New Jersey
- Productions: 2015 Paper Mill Playhouse; 2017 Broadway

Bandstand: The New American Musical (or simply Bandstand) is an original musical composed by Richard Oberacker with book and lyrics by Oberacker and Robert Taylor.

The first musical certified by the organization Got Your 6 tells the story of a group of veterans returning home to the United States after World War II. Struggling to fit into their old lives while dealing with the lingering effects of the war – including post-traumatic stress and survivor's guilt – they form a band composed solely of veterans to compete in a national patriotic radio contest in New York City. The winning song will be performed in a new Hollywood by the band, which will make them household names. This group of veterans play their hearts out while also providing post-war America a look into the effects the Second World War had on America's heroes.

The original production of Bandstand, directed by Andy Blankenbuehler and starring Laura Osnes, Corey Cott and Beth Leavel, premiered at the Paper Mill Playhouse in Millburn in October 2015 and opened on Broadway on April 26, 2017, closing on September 17, 2017.

== Productions ==
=== Paper Mill Playhouse premiere ===
A workshop of Bandstand was held in September 2014 in New York City, and featured Laura Osnes, Corey Cott and Beth Leavel.

The show, retitled as The Bandstand, began previews on October 8, 2015, at the Paper Mill Playhouse in Millburn, New Jersey, before its official opening on October 18, 2015, for a limited run until November 8, 2015. Direction and choreography was by Andy Blankenbuehler, with the cast that starred Corey Cott, Laura Osnes and Beth Leavel as Donny, Julia, and Mrs. Adams, respectively. The musical contains swing, bebop, and jitterbug.

=== Broadway production ===
The musical, once again titled Bandstand, premiered on Broadway at the Bernard B. Jacobs Theatre on April 26, 2017, after starting previews on March 31, with Osnes and Cott and direction and choreography by Andy Blankenbuehler. The Broadway cast featured Beth Leavel, Alex Bender, Joe Carroll, Brandon James Ellis, James Nathan Hopkins, and Geoff Packard. The production closed on Broadway on September 17, 2017, after 24 previews and 166 regular performances.

A professional recording of the Broadway production was screened in movie theaters on June 25, 2018 and June 28, 2018. The professional recording made a reappearance in theaters November 15, 2018 and November 19, 2018. During the COVID-19 pandemic, Playbill offered the professional recording of the Broadway production for streaming on their website from April 10 to April 17, 2020, with a portion of the proceeds going towards the Actors Fund of America. They also hosted a live watch party of the recording on April 11.

=== US national tour ===
A US tour opened October 29, 2019 in College Station, Texas, starring Jennifer Elizabeth Smith as Julia Trojan and Zack Zaromatidis as Donny Novitski. On April 16, 2020, it was announced that the tour would not resume following its early closure due to the COVID-19 pandemic. The last performance was on March 12, 2020 in Easton, Pennsylvania.

== Synopsis ==
=== Act I ===
Newly back from the front lines, the young vet, pianist, and singer/songwriter Donny Novitski returns home from the war to Cleveland, Ohio in 1945, to find an America eager to get back to life ("Just Like It Was Before"). Unable to find a place in post-war Cleveland for himself, Donny hears of a National Radio Swing Band Competition in Tribute to the Troops, and hatches a plan to create a band composed entirely of fellow vets for a shot at instant fame and Hollywood fortune ("Donny Novitski"). With a statewide competition to win first, Donny puts his band together: Jimmy Campbell on saxophone and clarinet, Davy Zlatic on bass, Nick Radel on trumpet, Wayne Wright on trombone, and Johnny Simpson on drums ("I Know a Guy"). Each of the members of the band have struggled with the adjustment from military life to life at home, but they find friendship and commonality over this shared goal.

Following their first performance ("Ain't We Proud"), Donny makes good on a promise to check in on Julia Trojan, the young widow of the man who had been his best friend in the war, Michael. Meanwhile, the vets in Donny's new band try desperately to readjust to civilian life ("Proud Riff"). As Julia prepares to host Donny for dinner in the hope of learning more about her husband's death, she confides in her mother, June Adams, that she just wants to be who she was before her husband's death ("Who I Was"). During dinner, Donny avoids discussing the death of Julia's husband. Later, haunted by the memories of war, the band members play their instruments, and Donny arrives at the church where Julia sings ("Counterpoint/Pie Jesu"). Impressed by her voice, Donny invites Julia to hear the band he's put together. Excitedly, Julia's mother hopes that all will soon be "Just Like It Was Before (Reprise)".

At the club, Donny invites Julia to sing a standard with the band ("First Steps First"). After the performance, Donny convinces a hesitant Julia to join the band, and they begin rehearsing in earnest ("Breathe") for their first gig together, trying out a new tune, "You Deserve It". When Donny's confidence in winning the competition falters, Julia offers him a journal of poems she has written. Inspired by Julia's take on post-war life, Donny composes a melody for one of her poems that he is convinced will win them the preliminary in Ohio which guarantees them a slot on the final broadcast in New York City. The Ohio broadcast is in full swing ("Dwight Anson & Jean Ann"), as the Donny Nova Band featuring Julia Trojan takes the stage with "Love Will Come and Find Me Again". The band wins the state preliminary, but are told they have to pay their own way to New York and are required to compete in a second round of elimination to secure their spot in the final broadcast. From disbelief and despair, Donny rallies his band of brothers with a vision of a world where they are recognized for their sacrifices and talents ("Right This Way").

=== Act II ===
With renewed determination that ("Nobody") tells them 'no', the Band begins playing every available club in Cleveland. Their growing number of fans celebrate that ("The Boys Are Back"). Julia and Donny continue their songwriting collaboration with ("I Got a Theory") about Cleveland itself, raising more money and hometown support. With the New York trip imminent, and the bond between them growing stronger, Julia presses Donny for the truth of her husband's death in battle. Horrified by the revelation that Donny accidentally caused Michael's death in a friendly fire incident, Julia abandons the band. After expressing her feelings to her mother, June tells Julia that sometimes ("Everything Happens") without reason or fault. After deep reflection, Julia returns to Donny with a new poem as an apology, which paints a raw and truthful portrait of Donny and the Band members: Johnny was severely injured and suffers from chronic pain, amnesia, and cognitive issues; Nick was a prisoner of war, giving him anger and trust issues; Davy liberated Dachau and has turned to alcohol and humor to cope with the memories; Wayne suffers from mental illness (likely OCD), meaning his children no longer recognize him and his marriage breaks down; Jimmy is gay and his partner died in combat, and he now focuses on his law studies to avoid letting anybody in on his terrible loss; Donny is an insomniac who is experiencing survivor's guilt after the death of Michael, Julia's husband. Inspired, Donny sets Julia's new poem to music, but both of them realize that the lyrics must be rewritten if the song is ever to be performed in public; they turn it into a love song about a girl and her returning soldier ("Welcome Home").

After having received a generous donation from their hometown fans, the Band sets off to live their dream of being ("A Band in New York City"). After a magical first night in New York, Donny and Julia find themselves outside her hotel room door, finally admitting their true feelings for one another ("This is Life"). Backstage at the final broadcast, moments before their appearance, the band realizes that the fine print of the contract they've signed is a trap, and the promised prize a sham. Refusing to allow their military service to be sentimentalized and exploited by the contest promoters, and unwilling to give away the rights to his song, Donny convinces the band to make the riskiest choice of all, and fight for themselves, and he and Julia kiss ("This is Life (Reprise)"). Live on air for the entire country to hear, the band stages a virtual coup d'état of the broadcast as Julia sings every brutally honest word of her original poem ("Welcome Home (Finale)").

In an "Epilogue", a year later, the Donny Nova Band featuring Julia Trojan find themselves to be celebrated stars, with sold-out New York concerts and a nationwide tour.

== Musical numbers ==
=== Paper Mill Playhouse 2015 ===
Source: Stage View

Act I

- "Just Like It Was Before" – Flora, Oscar, Donny, and Ensemble
- "Donny Novitski" – Donny
- "I Know a Guy" – Jimmy, Davy, Nick, Donny, Wayne, Johnny, and Ensemble
- "Ain't We Proud" – Donny, Jimmy, Johnny, Davy, Nick, Wayne, and Ensemble
- "Men Never Like to Talk" – Mrs. Adams
- "Counterpoint/Pie Jesu" – Julia and Ensemble
- "First Steps First" – Julia and Donny
- "Will That Be All?" – Julia, Donny, and Dolores
- "You Deserve It" – Donny and Julia, the Band, and Ensemble
- "What's the Harm in That?" – Julia
- "Worth It" – Donny and Julia, with the Band
- "Right This Way" – Donny and the Band

Act 2

- "Nobody" – Donny, Wayne, Nick, Davy, Julia, Johnny, Jimmy, and Ensemble
- "Love Will Come and Find Me Again" – Julia
- "I Got a Theory" – Donny, Julia, the Band, and Ensemble
- "Everything Happens" – Mrs. Adams
- "Welcome Home" – Julia, with the Band
- "A Band in New York City" – Donny, Julia, the Band, and Ensemble
- "Give Me a Reason" – Donny
- "Worth It (Reprise)" – Donny and Julia, with the Band
- "Welcome Home (Finale)" – Julia, with the Band

=== Broadway 2017 ===
Act I

- "Just Like It Was Before" – Company
- "Donny Novitski" – Donny
- "I Know a Guy" – Jimmy, Davy, Nick, Wayne, Donny and Company
- "Ain't We Proud" – Donny and The Band
- "Proud Riff" – Orchestra
- "Who I Was" – Julia
- "Counterpoint/Pie Jesu" – Julia and The Band
- "Just Like It Was Before (Reprise)" – Mrs. Adams
- "First Steps First" – Julia, Donny and The Band
- "Breathe" – Donny, Nick, Wayne, Davy, Jimmy, Johnny and Julia
- "You Deserve It" – Donny, Julia and The Band
- "Dwight Anson & Jean Ann" – Jean Ann and Orchestra
- "Love Will Come and Find Me Again" – Julia and The Band
- "Right This Way" – Donny, Nick, Wayne, Davy, Jimmy, Johnny and Julia

Act 2

- Entr'acte – Orchestra †
- "Nobody" – Donny, Wayne, Nick, Davy, Julia, Mrs. Adams, Johnny, Jimmy and Company
- "The Boys Are Back" – Company
- "I Got a Theory" – Julia, Donny, Wayne, Nick, Davy, Johnny, Jimmy and Company
- "Everything Happens" – Mrs. Adams
- "Welcome Home" – Donny, Julia and The Band
- "A Band in New York City" – Johnny, Davy, Jimmy, Nick, Wayne, Julia, Donny and Company
- "This is Life" – Donny and Julia
- "This is Life (Reprise)" – Donny
- "Welcome Home (Finale)" – Julia and The Band
- "Epilogue" – Donny, Julia, The Band and Company

† Not featured on Original Broadway Cast Recording

== Characters and original cast ==
The characters and original cast:

Character	Workshop (2014)	Paper Mill Playhouse (2015)	Original Broadway Cast (2017)
Donny Novitski	Jarrod Spector	Corey Cott	Corey Cott
Julia Trojan	Laura Osnes	Laura Osnes	Laura Osnes
Mrs. June Adams	Beth Leavel	Beth Leavel	Beth Leavel
Jimmy Campbell	James Nathan Hopkins	James Nathan Hopkins	James Nathan Hopkins
Davy Zlatic	Brandon J. Ellis	Brandon J. Ellis	Brandon J. Ellis
Nick Radel	Joey Pero	Joey Pero	Alex Bender
Wayne Wright	Geoff Packard	Geoff Packard	Geoff Packard
Johnny Simpson	Rob Marnell	Joe Carroll	Joe Carroll
Jean Ann Ryan	—N/a	Stacia Fernandez	Mary Callanan
Al	—N/a	—N/a	Kevyn Morrow
Mr. Jackson	Ryan Kasprzak	Ryan Kasprzak	Ryan Kasprzak
Andre Baruch	—N/a	Thomas Cannizzaro	Jonathan Shew
Jo	—N/a	—N/a	Jessica Lea Patty
Oliver	—N/a	Thomas Cannizzaro	Drew McVety
Roger Cohen	—N/a	Jeff Pew	Ryan VanDenBoom
Entertainment Director	—N/a	Tanya Birl	Morgan Marcell
James Haupt	—N/a	Daniel Cooney	Kevyn Morrow
Production Assistant	—N/a	Lauren Mufson	Mary Callanan
Tom	—N/a	Max Clayton	Max Clayton
Betsy	Andrea Dotto	Andrea Dotto	Andrea Dotto
Flora Novitski	—N/a	Lauren Mufson	—N/a
Oscar Novitski	—N/a	Daniel Cooney	—N/a
Talent Booker	—N/a	Jessica Lea Patty	—N/a
Blue Wisp Waitress	—N/a	Tanya Birl	—N/a
Dolores	—N/a	Jessica Lea Patty	—N/a
Sydney Lemon	—N/a	Daniel Cooney	—N/a

Notable Broadway replacements

- Joey Pero was injured in February 2017 and did not move with the musical to Broadway. He joined the Broadway production on June 30, 2017 in his original role of Nick, as well as performing as Nick when Bandstand had its two-night-only release in movie theaters all throughout the United States.
- Carleigh Bettiol replaced Jessica Lea Patty as Jo, Julia's understudy, and a member of the ensemble on August 1, 2017.

== Critical reception ==
=== Reviews ===
The Broadway production of Bandstand received mixed reviews from critics after opening on April 26, 2017. Critics across the board praised Andy Blankenbuehler for his choreography, which the New York Theatre Guide calls "superb in the extreme." The Chicago Tribune describes Blankenbuehler's choreography as having a "unique kindness and fragility." The main criticism of Bandstand regards the plot and character development. The show is applauded for its attempt to delve into the deeper issues that plagued those who came home after World War II. Despite this attempt, critics found the plot "a little too sweet" as it follows a predictable timeline. The unconventional look into the characters that make up the Donny Nova Band give the show a "raw nerve", but the veterans were provided with "few defining musical moments of their own."

=== Got Your 6 Certification ===
Starting in late 2015, writers Richard Oberacker and Robert Taylor received feedback from Got Your 6 to ensure that Bandstand was an accurate portrayal of WWII veterans. This led to a discussion between real veterans and the cast, engaging the cast and crew on how to avoid stereotypes and create characters that resemble real people. The collaboration with Got Your 6 resulted in Bandstand being the "first theater production to be 6 Certified for the show's reasonable and accurate veteran portrayals."

== Awards and nominations ==
=== Original Broadway Production ===
Year	Award	Category	Nominee	Result
2017	Tony Awards	Best Choreography	Andy Blankenbuehler	Won
2017	Tony Awards	Best Orchestrations	Bill Elliott & Greg Anthony Rassen	Nominated
2017	Drama Desk Awards	Outstanding Actress in a Musical	Laura Osnes	Nominated
2017	Drama Desk Awards	Outstanding Music	Richard Oberacker and Robert Taylor	Nominated
2017	Drama Desk Awards	Outstanding Book of a Musical	Richard Oberacker and Robert Taylor	Nominated
2017	Drama Desk Awards	Outstanding Orchestrations	Bill Elliott & Greg Anthony Rassen	Won
2017	Drama Desk Awards	Outstanding Choreography	Andy Blankenbuehler	Won
2017	Drama Desk Awards	Outstanding Costume Design in a Musical	Paloma Young	Nominated
2017	Drama Desk Awards	Outstanding Lighting Design in a Musical	Jeff Croiter	Nominated
2017	Drama League Award	Outstanding Production of a Broadway or Off-Broadway Musical		Nominated
2017	Drama League Award	Distinguished Performance	Laura Osnes	Nominated
2017	Outer Critics Circle Award	Outstanding Choreography	Andy Blankenbuehler	Nominated
2017	Outer Critics Circle Award	Outstanding Sound Design	Nevin Steinberg	Nominated
2017	Outer Critics Circle Award	Outstanding Orchestrations	Bill Elliott & Greg Anthony Rassen	Nominated
2017	Chita Rivera Awards	Outstanding Choreography in a Broadway Show	Andy Blankenbuehler	Won
2017	Chita Rivera Awards	Outstanding Ensemble in a Broadway Show		Nominated
2017	Chita Rivera Awards	Outstanding Male Dancer in a Broadway Show	Max Clayton	Nominated
2017	Chita Rivera Awards	Outstanding Male Dancer in a Broadway Show	Ryan Kasprzak	Nominated
2017	Chita Rivera Awards	Outstanding Female Dancer in a Broadway Show	Andrea Dotto	Nominated
2017	Chita Rivera Awards	Outstanding Female Dancer in a Broadway Show	Jaime Verazin	Nominated
