= Jim Stanek =

American actor (born 1971)

- Born: James Stanek; August 5, 1971 (age 55); Havre de Grace, Maryland, U.S.
- Education: Carnegie Mellon University
- Occupation: Actor
- Years active: 1996-present

James Stanek (born August 5, 1971) is an American theatre, film, and television actor.

== Early life ==
Stanek was born in Havre de Grace, Maryland and raised in Cranberry Township, Butler County, Pennsylvania, a suburb of Pittsburgh. He attended the Seneca Valley School District where he performed in such musicals as Grease and Little Shop of Horrors, among others. In Stanek's senior year of high school he auditioned for, and was accepted, into the Mini Stars musical theatre program at the Pittsburgh Civic Light Opera.

He attended and graduated from Carnegie Mellon University.

== Personal life ==
Stanek and his wife, Beth, currently reside in Manhattan, where they raise their three sons.

== Theatre credits ==
=== Broadway, Off-Broadway, and Tour Theatre ===
Year	Production	Role	Category
1996	Indiscretions	Michael (standby)	Broadway
1996	A Funny Thing Happened on the Way to the Forum	Hero	Broadway
1999	Captain Courageous	Dan	Off-Broadway
2000	Saturday Night	u/s Campbell, McDonald, Sorge	Off-Broadway
2001	The Good Companions	Performer	Off-Broadway
2001	Cyrano de Bergerac	Performer	Off-Broadway
2003	Oh, Boy!	Jim	Off-Broadway
2004	Best Foot Forward	Performer	Off-Broadway
2004	The Rivals	Footman; u/s Bob Acres, David, Fag	Broadway
2005	Little Women	(standby) Braxton, Laurie, Mr. Brooke, Rodrigo	Broadway
2005	Slut	Dan	Off-Broadway
2006	Jacques Brel Is Alive and Well and Living in Paris	Performer	Off-Broadway
2006	Lestat	Louis	Broadway
2007	Love You, You're Perfect, Now Change	Performer	Off-Broadway
2007	Frankenstein, A New Musical	Henry Clerval; u/s Victor	Off-Broadway
2009	The Story of My Life	Ensemble	Broadway
2009	Night Sky	Performer	Off-Broadway
2010	Jacques Brel Returns	Performer	Off-Broadway
2011	Freud's Last Season	C.S. Lewis	Off-Broadway
2011	A Tree Grows in Brooklyn	Johnny	Off-Broadway
2011	Desperate Writers	Performer	Off-Broadway
2013	A Gentleman's Guide to Love and Murder	Swing	Broadway
2015	Fun Home	Bruce (standby)	Broadway
2022-2023	Into the Woods	Steward; u/s Baker	Broadway
2022-2023	Into the Woods	Steward; u/s Baker u/s Narrator/Mysterious Man	National Tour

=== Regional theatre ===
- Roman Holiday (The Guthrie Theater [Minneapolis, MN])
- Ace (Signature Theatre)
- The Producers (North Shore Music Theatre)
- Carnival (Kennedy Center)
- Lestat (Curran Theatre)
- My Fair Lady (McCarter Theatre Center)
- The Threepenny Opera (Williamstown Theatre Festival)
- Damn Yankees (American Musical Theatre of San Jose)
- Chrysalis (Adirondack Theatre Festival)
- The Three Musketeers (American Musical Theatre of San Jose)
- Let's Face It (New York Historical Society)
- Thoroughly Modern Millie (La Jolla Playhouse)
- Purlie (Kennedy Center)
- Pippin (Bay Street Theatre)
- Mame (Pittsburgh Civic Light Opera)
- George M! (St. Louis MUNY)
- Into the Woods - The Baker (The Patchogue Theatre)
- The Recipe - Paul Child (La Jolla Playhouse)

== Filmography ==
Year	Title	Role	Type	Notes
1998	Law & Order	Arraignment Clerk	Television	one episode
1998	The Adversaries	Series Regular	TV movie	as "James Stanek"
2000	Mary and Rhoda	Official Tour Guide	TV movie	
2000	Brooklyn Sonnet	Jimmy O'Conner	TV movie	as "James Stanek"
2001	MisGuiding Light	Floyd Boyd	TV mini-series	
2006	Bella	Henri	Film	
2008	Olive Garden	Olive Garden Enthusiast	Commercial	
2010	As the World Turns	Nathan Randall	Television	one episode
2011	No Matter What	Berkeley	Film	
2013	The Good Wife	Todd Koopman	Television	one episode
2019	Mr Robot	Jason	Television	

== Discography ==
- Kitty's Kisses (Original Studio Cast)
- Frankenstein (Original Off-Broadway Cast)
- Lestat (Original Broadway Cast)
- The 3hree Musketeers (Original American Cast)
- A Funny Thing Happened on the Way to the Forum (1996 Broadway Revival Cast)

The Lestat original Broadway cast recording was recorded by Mercury Records on May 22, 2006, at Sony Studios in New York City. Planned release was July 11, 2006 but has been postponed indefinitely. In August 2006 after numerous rumors of an August release date, Elton John's website released this statement:

"We have received many messages asking when the Lestat cast album will be released. According to Elton's management, there are no plans to release the album at present."

The cast album has still yet to be released.
