= Kevin Kline Awards =

Awards ceremony recognizing outstanding achievement in theatre in the St. Louis area

The Kevin Kline Awards were started in 2006, to recognize outstanding achievement in professional theatre in the Greater St. Louis area. The awards are sponsored by PTAC, the Professional Theatre Awards Council, and were named in honor of Kevin Kline, a St. Louis native who has been the recipient of both Tony and Academy Awards.

== Eligibility and judging ==
In order for a play to be considered for a Kevin Kline Award, it must:

- Be produced within the St. Louis metro area
- Include at least six performances
- Have paid those who work on the show, including both actors and crew

Each nominee is reviewed by seven judges, who are drawn randomly from a pool of 49. Judges then give each production a numerical rating on each of the available categories (acting, directing, lighting, etc.) and submit their ballot within 24 hours of seeing the production. At the end of each year, the five productions with the highest score in each category are listed as the nominees, and the award goes to the one with the best score:

The first award ceremony was held on March 20, 2006, in the Roberts Orpheum Theatre, and hosted by St. Louis-native Broadway actor Jason Danieley. Presenters included Kline, and St. Louis-born Broadway actor Ken Page. Kline received the first-ever Kevin Kline Award to be created, and was also told at the performance about the creation of the Kevin Kline Theater Ticket Fund, which will provide free tickets to area high school students.

The Kevin Kline Awards were suspended in June 2012 due to financial concerns.

== 2006 Awards ==
=== Outstanding Production of a Musical ===
- West Side Story, The Muny

=== Outstanding Production of a Play ===
- Take Me Out, The Repertory Theatre of St. Louis

=== Outstanding Director of a Musical ===
- Kevin Backstrom, West Side Story, The Muny
- Michael Hamilton, Footloose, Stages St. Louis

=== Outstanding Director of a Play ===
- Rob Ruggiero, Take Me Out, The Repertory Theatre of St. Louis

=== Outstanding Musical Direction ===
- Kelsey Halbert, West Side Story, The Muny

=== Outstanding Choreography ===
- Dana Lewis, Footloose, Stages St. Louis

=== Outstanding Costume Design ===
- Reggie Ray, Crowns, The Repertory Theatre of St. Louis

=== Outstanding Lighting Design ===
- John Lasiter, Take Me Out, The Repertory Theatre of St. Louis

=== Outstanding Set Design ===
- Christopher Pickart, The Tempest, Shakespeare Festival St. Louis

=== Outstanding Sound Design ===
- Ann Slayton & Robin Weatherall, The Tempest, Shakespeare Festival St. Louis

=== Outstanding New Play or Musical ===
- The Ensemble, So to Speak, Washington Avenue Players Project

=== Outstanding Ensemble in a Play ===
- Going to See the Elephant, Orange Girls

=== Outstanding Ensemble in a Musical ===
- West Side Story, The Muny

=== Outstanding Lead Actor in a Musical ===
- Ben Nordstrom, Footloose, Stages St. Louis

=== Outstanding Lead Actor in a Play ===
- Nat DeWolf, Take Me Out, The Repertory Theatre of St. Louis

=== Outstanding Lead Actress in a Musical ===
- Zoe Vonder Haar, Hello, Dolly!, Stages St. Louis

=== Outstanding Lead Actress in a Play ===
- Michelle Hand, Separate Tables, Act Inc.
- Nancy Lewis, Going to See the Elephant, Orange Girls

=== Outstanding Supporting Actor in a Musical ===
- Ken Page, Jesus Christ Superstar, The Muny

=== Outstanding Supporting Actor in a Play ===
- Gary Wayne Barker, Driving Miss Daisy, New Jewish Theatre

=== Outstanding Supporting Actress in a Musical ===
- Natascia Diaz, West Side Story, The Muny

=== Outstanding Supporting Actress in a Play ===
- Brooke Edwards, Going to See the Elephant, Orange Girls

=== Outstanding Production for Young Audiences ===
- Bah! Humbug!, The Imaginary Theatre Company/The Repertory Theatre of St. Louis

== 2011 Awards ==
- Outstanding Production for Young Audiences: Tie: Delilah’s Wish (Metro Theatre Company)
- Tie: The Aristocats (Stages St. Louis)
  - A Peter Rabbit Tale (The Rep’s Imaginary Theatre Company)
  - Amelia Earhart (The Rep’s Imaginary Theatre Company)
  - The Nutcracker (The Rep’s Imaginary Theatre Company)
- Outstanding New Play or Musical: David Slavitt, translator (Oedipus King, Upstream Theater)
  - Jami Brandli (The Sinker, HotCity Theatre)
  - Lee Patton Chiles (Eye on the Sparrow: The World Within St. Louis, Gitana Productions)
  - Sandra Marie Vago (Treading Backward Thru Quicksand Without Wearing Your Water Wings, Black Cat Theatre)
- Outstanding Costume Design: John Inchiostro (The Aristocats, Stages St. Louis)
  - JC Krajicek (Tartuffe, Mustard Seed)
  - Dorothy Marshall Englis (Hamlet, Shakespeare Festival St. Louis)
  - JC Krajicek (Crumbs From the Table of Joy, Mustard Seed Theatre)
  - Jess Goldstein (High, The Repertory Theatre of St. Louis)
- Outstanding Lighting Design: John Lasiter (High, The Repertory Theatre of St. Louis)
  - Brian Sidney Bembridge (Crime and Punishment, The Repertory Theatre of St. Louis)
  - Matthew McCarthy (Big River, Stages St. Louis)
  - Matthew McCarthy (Promises, Promises, Stages St. Louis)
- Outstanding Set Design: David Gallo (High, The Repertory Theatre of St. Louis)
  - Gianni Downs (Crime and Punishment, The Repertory Theatre of St. Louis)
  - Christopher M. Waller (It Had to be You, Max and Louie Productions)
  - Mark Halpin (Promises, Promises, Stages St. Louis)
  - Michael Heil (Oedipus King, Upstream Theater)
- Outstanding Sound Design: Tie: Josh Limpert (Outlying Islands, Upstream Theater)
- Tie: Ann Slayton and Robin Weatherall (Hamlet, Shakespeare Festival St. Louis)
- Tie: Matthew Koch (Slasher, HotCity Theatre)
  - Mic Pool (The 39 Steps, The Repertory Theatre of St. Louis)
- Outstanding Ensemble in a Play: The Chosen (Mustard Seed Theatre)
  - The 39 Steps (The Repertory Theatre of St. Louis)
  - Outlying Islands (Upstream Theater)
  - Hamlet (Shakespeare Festival St. Louis)
  - High (The Repertory Theatre of St. Louis)
- Outstanding Supporting Actress in a Play: Kari Ely (Why Torture is Wrong, and The People Who Love Them, HotCity Theatre)
  - Kimiye Corwin (Hamlet, Shakespeare Festival of St. Louis)
  - Colleen Backer (Our Town, Stray Dog Theatre)
  - Patrese McClain (Crumbs From the Table of Joy, Mustard Seed Theatre)
  - Kelley Ryan (Equus, HotCity Theatre)
  - Betsy Bowman (The Tempest, Shakespeare Company of St. Louis)
  - Susan Greenhill (Next Fall, The Repertory Theatre of St. Louis)
- Outstanding Supporting Actor in a Play: Evan Jonigkeit (High, The Repertory Theatre of St. Louis)
  - Jerry Vogel (Outlying Islands, Upstream Theater)
  - Bobby Miller (Laughter on the 23rd Floor, New Jewish Theatre)
  - Richard Lewis (The Chosen, Mustard Seed Theatre)
  - Aaron Orion Baker (Long Day’s Journey Into Night, Muddy Waters)
- Outstanding Lead Actress in a Play: Kari Ely (Long Day’s Journey Into Night, Muddy Waters)
  - Michelle Hand (Fires in the Mirror, Mustard Seed Theatre)
  - Magan Wiles (My Name is Rachel Corrie, Blue Rose Stage Collective)
  - Kathleen Turner (High, The Repertory Theatre of St. Louis)
- Outstanding Lead Actor in a Play: Jim Butz (Hamlet, Shakespeare Festival St. Louis)
  - Jason Cannon (Outlying Islands, Upstream Theater)
  - Scott McMaster (Outlying Islands, Upstream Theater)
  - Drew Pannebacker (Equus, HotCity Theatre)
  - Alan Knoll (This Wonderful Life, Dramatic License Productions)
- Outstanding Director of a Play: Philip Boehm (Outlying Islands, Upstream Theater)
  - Bruce Longworth (Hamlet, Shakespeare Festival St. Louis)
  - Doug Finlayson (Equus, HotCity Theatre)
  - Philip Boehm (Oedipus King, Upstream Theater)
  - Rob Ruggiero (High, The Repertory Theatre of St. Louis)
  - Deanna Jent (The Chosen, Mustard Seed Theatre)
- Outstanding Production of a Play: Hamlet (Shakespeare Festival St. Louis)
  - Outlying Islands (Upstream Theater)
  - High (The Repertory Theatre of St. Louis)
  - The Chosen (Mustard Seed Theatre)
- Outstanding Director of Musical: Michael Hamilton (Promises, Promises, Stages St. Louis)
  - Ron Himes (Five Guys Named Moe, The Black Rep)
  - Paul Blake (Damn Yankees, The Muny)
  - Marc Bruni (Sound of Music, The Muny)
  - Edward Coffield (Man of La Mancha, Insight)
- Outstanding Choreography: Mary MacLeod (Damn Yankees, The Muny)
  - Lazette Rayford-O’Brien (Five Guys Named Moe, The Black Rep)
  - Heather Beal (The Me Nobody Knows, The Black Rep)
  - Suzanne Viverito (Cats, The Muny)
- Outstanding Ensemble in a Musical: Five Guys Named Moe (The Black Rep)
  - The Wild Party (New Line)
  - Damn Yankees (The Muny)
  - Cats (The Muny)
  - Aristocats (Stages St. Louis)
  - Show Boat (The Muny)
  - State Fair (Stages St. Louis)
  - Last of the Red Hot Mamas (New Jewish Theatre)
- Outstanding Supporting Actress in a Musical: Brandi Wooten (Promises, Promises, Stages St. Louis)
  - Sharisa Whatley (The Me Nobody Knows, The Black Rep)
  - Jo Ann Hawkins White (Show Boat, The Muny)
  - Johanna Elkana-Hale (Last of the Red Hot Mamas, New Jewish Theatre)
- Outstanding Supporting Actor in a Musical: Michel Bell (Show Boat, The Muny)
  - Joneal Joplin (The Fantasticks, The Repertory Theatre of St. Louis)
  - Lara Teeter (Beauty and the Beast, The Muny)
  - Kevin Loreque (Cats, The Muny)
- Outstanding Lead Actress in a Musical': Ashley Brown (The Sound of Music, The Muny)
  - Vanessa Rubin (Yesterdays: An evening with Billie Holiday, The Black Rep)
  - Stephanie J. Block (Cats, The Muny)
  - Leah Horowitz (Show Boat, The Muny)
  - Hollie Howard (State Fair, Stages St. Louis)
- Outstanding Lead Actor in a Musical: Ben Nordstrom (Promises, Promises, Stages St. Louis)
  - Ben Nordstrom (Gutenberg! The Musical!, Temporary Theatre)
  - John Sparger (Pump Boys and Dinettes, Bear Stage)
  - Jeffrey Pruett (The Wild Party, New Line)
  - Eric Kunze (Damn Yankees, The Muny)
- Outstanding Musical Direction: Charles Creath (Five Guys Named Moe, The Black Rep)
  - Sallie duMaine (Pump Boys and Dinettes, Bear Stage)
  - Michael Horsley (Damn Yankees, The Muny)
  - Lisa Campbell Albert (Promises, Promises, Stages St. Louis)
  - Ben Whiteley (Sound of Music, The Muny)
  - Catherine Matejka (Show Boat, The Muny)
  - Henry Palkes (Last of the Red Hot Mamas, New Jewish Theatre)
- Outstanding Production of a Musical: Show Boat (The Muny)
  - Five Guys Named Moe (The Black Rep)
  - Big River (Stages St. Louis)
  - Damn Yankees (The Muny)
  - Promises, Promises (Stages St. Louis)
  - Sound of Music (The Muny)
  - State Fair (Stages St. Louis)

== 2012 Awards ==
- Outstanding Production for Young Audiences: The Giver, Metro Theater Company and Edison Theatre
  - Chanticleer!, The Repertory Theatre of St. Louis/Imaginary Theatre Company
  - Trail of Tears, The Repertory Theatre of St. Louis/Imaginary Theatre Company
  - Cruel to be Kind?, Shakespeare Festival Education Tour
  - Elves and the Shoemaker, The Repertory Theatre of St. Louis/Imaginary Theatre Company
- Outstanding New Play or Musical: Deanna Jent, Falling, Mustard Seed Theatre
  - Deanna Jent, Till We Have Faces, Mustard Seed Theatre
  - Samm Art-Williams, The Montford Point Marine, The Black Rep
  - David L. Williams, The Winners, HotCity Theatre
  - Carter Lewis, Hit-Story, OnSite Theatre
  - Lucia Laragione, English translation byPhilip Boehm, Cooking With Elisa, Upstream Theater
- Outstanding Costume Design: Dorothy Marshall Englis, The Secret Garden, Stages St. Louis
  - Dorothy Marshall Englis, The Vibrator Play, The Repertory Theatre of St. Louis
  - Garth Dunbar, Awake and Sing!, The New Jewish Theatre
  - Michele Siler, The Death of Atahualpa, Upstream Theater
  - Brad Muskgrove, Disney’s 101 Dalmatians, Stages St. Louis
  - Teresa Doggett, The Royal Family, Act Inc.
  - Lou Bird, Victor/Victoria, Stages St. Louis
  - JC Krajicek, Palmer Park, St. Louis Actors’ Studio
- Outstanding Lighting Design: Robert M. Wierzel, The Adventures of Tom Sawyer, The Repertory Theatre of St. Louis
  - Josh Smith, The Immigrant, The New Jewish Theatre
  - Matthew McCarthy, The Secret Garden, Stages St. Louis
  - Phil Monat, Red, The Repertory Theatre of St. Louis
  - Matthew McCarthy, Victor/Victoria, Stages St. Louis
  - Kirk Bookman & Steve O’Shea, God of Carnage, The Repertory Theatre of St. Louis
- Outstanding Set Design: *Tie: Gianni Downs, The Vibrator Play, The Repertory Theatre of St. Louis
- Tie: Scott C. Neale, Awake and Sing!, The New Jewish Theatre
- Tie: Michael Ganio, Red, The Repertory Theatre of St. Louis
  - Scott C. Neale, Cooking With Elisa, Upstream Theater
  - Regina Garcia, Ruined, The Black Rep
  - Scott C. Neale, The Taming of the Shrew, Shakespeare Festival St. Louis
- Outstanding Sound Design: Daniel Baker & Aaron Meicht, The Adventures of Tom Sawyer, The Repertory Theatre of St. Louis
  - Rusty Wandall, Macbeth, The Repertory Theatre of St. Louis
  - Josh Limpert, The Immigrant, The New Jewish Theatre
  - Rusty Wandall, Red, The Repertory Theatre of St. Louis
  - Rusty Wandall, Circle Mirror Transformation, The Repertory Theatre of St. Louis
- Outstanding Ensemble Play: Tie: The Immigrant, The New Jewish Theatre
- Tie: Circle Mirror Transformation, The Repertory Theatre of St. Louis
  - The Vibrator Play, The Repertory Theatre of St. Louis
  - The Real McCoy, The Black Rep
  - The Adventures of Tom Sawyer, The Repertory Theatre of St. Louis
- Outstanding Supporting Actress in a Play: Peggy Billo, The Immigrant, The New Jewish Theatre
  - Linda Kennedy, Pericles, The Black Rep
  - Emily Baker, Just Desserts, St. Louis Actors' Studio
  - Julie Venegoni, Savage in Limbo, OnSite Theatre
  - Linda Kennedy, Blood Wedding, Upstream Theater
  - Hayley Treide, The Adventures of Tom Sawyer, The Repertory Theatre of St. Louis
- Outstanding Supporting Actor in a Play: Gary Wayne Barker, The Immigrant, The New Jewish Theatre
  - Bob Harvey, The Price, Avalon Theatre Company
  - Chauncy Thomas, The Real McCoy, The Black Rep
  - Jason Cannon, Awake and Sing!, The New Jewish Theatre
  - Jonathan Foster, Falling, Mustard Seed Theatre
- Outstanding Lead Actress in a Play: Brooke Edwards, Danny and the Deep Blue Sea, The Non-Prophet Theatre Company
  - Andrea Frye, Ruined, The Black Rep
  - Kari Ely, Sirens, The New Jewish Theatre
  - Michelle Hand, Falling, Mustard Seed Theatre
  - Susan Louise O'Connor, God of Carnage, The Repertory Theatre of St. Louis
- Outstanding Lead Actor in a Play: Bob Thibaut, The Immigrant, The New Jewish Theatre
  - Gary Barker, Shadowlands, Mustard Seed Theatre
  - J. Samuel Davis, Ruined, The Black Rep
  - John Pierson, Closer, St. Louis Actors' Studio
  - Bobby Miller, Awake and Sing!, The New Jewish Theatre
  - Brian Dykstra, Red, The Repertory Theatre of St. Louis
  - Danny McCarthy, Circle Mirror Transformation, The Repertory Theatre of St. Louis
- Outstanding Director of a Play: Steven Woolf, Red, The Repertory Theatre of St. Louis
  - Andrew Moodie, The Real McCoy, The Black Rep
  - Edward Coffield, The Immigrant, The New Jewish Theatre
  - Stuart Carden, Circle Mirror Transformation, The Repertory Theatre of St. Louis
  - Jeremy B. Cohen, The Adventures of Tom Sawyer, The Repertory Theatre of St. Louis
- Outstanding Production of a Play: Tie: Red, The Repertory Theatre of St. Louis
- Tie: Awake and Sing!, The New Jewish Theatre
  - The Vibrator Play, The Repertory Theatre of St. Louis
  - The Immigrant, The New Jewish Theatre
  - God of Carnage, The Repertory Theatre of St. Louis
  - Circle Mirror Transformation, The Repertory Theatre of St. Louis
- Outstanding Musical Direction: Tie: Lisa Campbell-Albert, The Secret Garden, Stages St. Louis
- Tie: Joe Schoen, Godspell, Mustard Seed Theatre
  - Michael Sebastian, Beehive, The Repertory Theatre of St. Louis
  - Charles Creath, Black Pearl Sings!, The Black Rep
  - Michael Horsley, Seven Brides for Seven Brothers, The Muny
- Outstanding Choreography: Pepper Clyde, Seven Brides for Seven Brothers, The Muny
  - Kelli Barclay, Singin’ in the Rain, The Muny
  - Dana Lewis, The Secret Garden, Stages St. Louis
  - Dana Lewis, Victor/Victoria, Stages St. Louis
  - Alicia Gbaho, Black Nativity, The Black Rep
- Outstanding Ensemble in a Musical: Seven Brides for Seven Brothers, The Muny
  - Beehive, The Repertory Theatre of St. Louis
  - Legally Blonde, The Muny
  - Singin’ in the Rain, The Muny
  - Godspell, Mustard Seed Theatre
- Outstanding Supporting Actress in a Musical: Melinda Crown, Victor/Victoria, Stages St. Louis
  - Jessica Vaccaro, A Chorus Line, Stages St. Louis
  - Michele Ragusa, Singin’ in the Rain, The Muny
  - Julia Cardia, The Secret Garden, Stages St. Louis
  - Amy Loui, Godspell, Mustard Seed Theatre
- Outstanding Supporting Actor in a Musical: Curtis Holbrook, Singin’ in the Rain, The Muny
  - Ken Page, Little Shop of Horrors, The Muny
  - Lewis J. Stadlen, Bye Bye Birdie, The Muny
  - Steve Judkins, Victor/Victoria, Stages St. Louis
- Outstanding Lead Actress in a Musical: Alexis Kinney, The Secret Garden, Stages St. Louis
  - Lisa Estridge, Beehive, The Repertory Theatre of St. Louis
  - Debra Walton, Beehive, The Repertory Theatre of St. Louis
  - Denise Thimes, Black Pearl Sings!, The Black Rep
  - Alli Mauzey, Little Shop of Horrors, The Muny
  - Jenny Powers, Seven Brides for Seven Brothers, The Muny
- Outstanding Lead Actor in a Musical: Leigh Wakeford, Disney’s 101 Dalmatians, Stages St. Louis
  - Tony Yazbeck, Singin’ in the Rain, The Muny
  - James Bleecker, Thrill Me, Max & Louie Productions
  - David Schmittou, Victor/Victoria, Stages St. Louis
- Outstanding Director of a Musical: Deanna Jent, Godspell, Mustard Seed Theatre
  - Andrea Frye, Black Pearl Sings!, The Black Rep
  - Rick Conant, Singin’ in the Rain, The Muny
  - John Miller-Stephany, Little Shop of Horrors, The Muny
  - Mark Schneider, Seven Brides for Seven Brothers, The Muny
- Outstanding Production of a Musical: Singin’ in the Rain, The Muny
  - The Secret Garden, Stages St. Louis
  - Seven Brides for Seven Brothers, The Muny
  - Victor/Victoria, Stages St. Louis
  - Godspell, Mustard Seed Theatre
