= The Repertory Theatre of St. Louis =

Missouri theatre company

- Formation: 1966
- Type: Theatre group
- Location(s): Loretto-Hilton Center for the Performing Arts Webster Groves, Missouri
- Artistic director: Kate Bergstrom
- Website: www.repstl.org

The St. Louis Repertory Theater is a repertory theater, based in Webster Groves, Missouri, a suburb of St. Louis. It is often referred to locally simply as "The Rep". Kate Bergstrom is the Artistic Director and Danny Williams is the Managing Director.

== Programs ==
In 1975 The Imaginary Theater Company begins bringing The Rep's work to schools and younger audiences.

In 2005, The Rep began a new performance series, the "Off-Ramp performance series", with performances at The Grandel Theatre in Grand Center.

In 2012 The Rep created The Ignite Festival of New Plays to support its new play development work.

In 2020 The Rep was part of the Play At Home program, commissioning short plays for audiences to perform while stuck at home.

== History ==
The Rep was founded in 1966 and made its home at Webster University's Loretto-Hilton Center for the Performing Arts.

The first production at The Rep was two Peter Shaffer plays "The Private Ear" and "The Public Eye" presented together.

In 1970 The Rep stopped producing for a year to plan and work on its finances. It returned to producing in 1971.

In 1986 Steven Woolf officially became the Artistic Director of the theater and Mark Bernstein joined the staff as Managing Director. In 2017 Steven Woolf announced plans to retire after running the theater for over 30 years. Hana S. Sharif took over as the Artistic Director in 2019.

In 2021 Mark Bernstein retired as Managing Director and was replaced by Danny Williams

== Venues ==
The Rep's home at Loretto-Hilton Center is shared with the Opera Theatre of Saint Louis, as well as The Conservatory of Theatre Arts at Webster University and Webster University's dance department.

In early 2007, The Rep considered moving from the Loretto-Hilton Center to an alternate venue.

== Past seasons ==
Notable Highlights from past seasons include:

The 50th anniversary season of shows in 2016-2017 which included: Follies, The World Premiere of Dael Orlandersmith's Until the Flood, A Christmas Carol, All My Sons, To Kill a Mockingbird and Million Dollar Quartet

== See also ==
- Theater in the United States
