= Alan Zweibel =

American author, screenwriter, producer, director, actor, and comedian (born 1950)

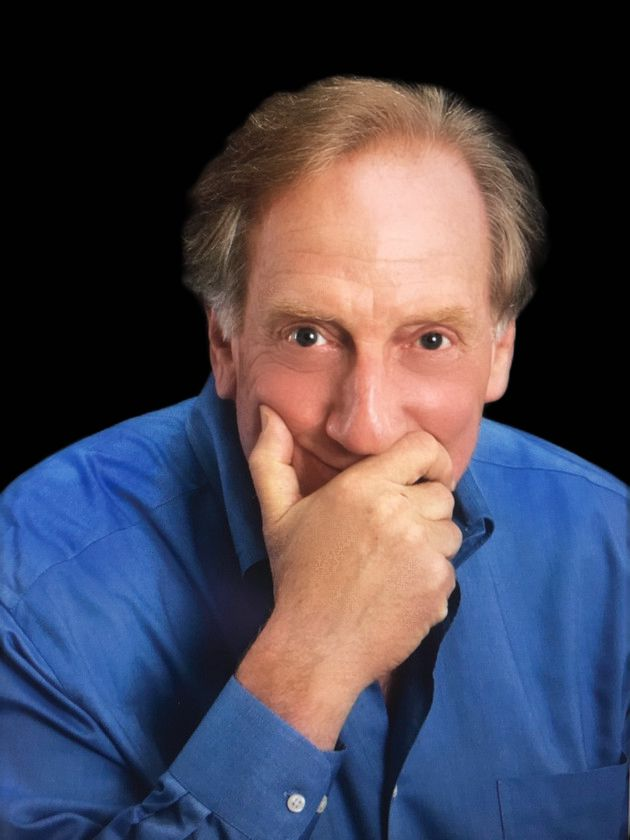
- Born: May 20, 1950 (age 76); New York City, U.S.
- Occupations: Author, playwright, screenwriter, producer, director, actor
- Spouse: Robin (1979)
- Children: 3
- Writing career
- Years active: 1974–present
- Website: alanzweibel.com

Alan Zweibel (born May 20, 1950) is an American writer, producer, director, comedian and actor. An original Saturday Night Live writer, Zweibel has won five Emmy Awards and two Writers Guild of America Awards for his work in television, which includes It's Garry Shandling's Show (co-creator and producer) and Curb Your Enthusiasm.

Among his body of work, Zweibel collaborated with Billy Crystal on the Tony Award-winning production of 700 Sundays, and most recently co-wrote and produced the feature film, Here Today with Billy Crystal.

He has written 11 books—his last, a cultural memoir Laugh Lines: My Life Helping Funny People Be Funnier was published by Abrams Books in 2020. Other books include The Other Shulman: A Novel, which won the 2006 Thurber Prize for American Humor; and Lunatics with Dave Barry.

== Early life ==
Zweibel, who is Jewish, was born May 20, 1950, in Brooklyn, New York City, to Julius and Shirley (Bram) Zweibel. He grew up in the New York City suburbs of Wantagh and Woodmere on Long Island. He graduated from George W. Hewlett High School in 1968 and the University at Buffalo in 1972.

Upon graduation from college, Zweibel started writing for stand-up comedians who allegedly paid him seven dollars per joke. He later compiled over 1,100 jokes into a portfolio which he showed to producer Lorne Michaels who then hired Zweibel to be one of the original writers of a new show then called Saturday Night.

== Career ==
=== Television ===
During his five years at Saturday Night Live (1975–1980), Zweibel wrote many iconic sketches, including the Samurai for John Belushi, and created the characters of Roseanne Roseannadanna and Emily Litella, both portrayed by Gilda Radner. As an in-joke, Richard Feder of Fort Lee, New Jersey, a name and hometown often mentioned by Roseanne Roseannadanna on Weekend Update, is Zweibel's real life brother-in-law who did live in Fort Lee, New Jersey.

Zweibel's close friendship and collaboration with Gilda Radner extended beyond their tenure at Saturday Night Live – as her last television appearance was on an episode of It's Garry Shandling's Show which Zweibel co-created and produced. After Radner's death from ovarian cancer, Zweibel wrote a best-selling book about their relationship titled Bunny Bunny: Gilda Radner – a Sort of Love Story which he later adapted into an off-Broadway play, Bunny Bunny.

Zweibel has won multiple Emmy, Writers Guild of America (WGA), and Television Critics Awards (TCA) for his work in television which also includes Curb Your Enthusiasm, It's Garry Shandling's Show, and an episode of Monk. He can be seen in the documentary The Last Laugh about humor and the Holocaust; Judd Apatow's The Zen Diaries of Garry Shandling (HBO); Gilbert, a documentary about the life of Gilbert Gottfried; and Love, Gilda, the Emmy-nominated CNN documentary for which he also served as executive producer.

=== Publishing ===
Zweibel has written a number of books. His cultural memoir, Laugh Lines: My Life Helping Funny People Be Funnier was published by Abrams Books in 2020. Other books include The Other Shulman: A Novel, which won the 2006 Thurber Prize for American Humor; Lunatics with Dave Barry; For This We Left Egypt and A Field Guide for the Jewish People, both with Dave Barry and Adam Mansbach; and Bunny Bunny: Gilda Radner—A Sort of Love Story. His popular children's book, Our Tree Named Steve, was a Scholastic Book Club selection that has been translated into eleven languages, and his young adult novel, North, was made into a movie directed by Rob Reiner. A collection of short stories and essays, Clothing Optional, was published by Villard in 2008. He also penned a best-selling e-book titled From My Bottom Drawer.

=== Theater ===
Zweibel's work has appeared both on and off Broadway. On Broadway, he co-wrote Fame Becomes Me with Martin Short, and collaborated with Billy Crystal on the Tony Award-winning production of 700 Sundays. Off-Broadway shows include Between Cars, Comic Dialogue, Bunny Bunny, and Happy. Taking to the stage himself, Zweibel is an ensemble performer in Celebrity Autobiography at New York's Triad Theater— and is a sought after keynote speaker.

=== Film ===
He co-wrote and co-produced Here Today (2021) with Billy Crystal (who also directed and starred alongside Tiffany Haddish), and was the co-writer for Dragnet (1987 film), The Story of Us (1999) and North (1994).

== Accolades ==
Zweibel has been honored by the Writers Guild of America and the Television Critics Association. He was awarded the 2006 Thurber Prize for American Humor for his book, The Other Shulman. In 2009, he was awarded an honorary PhD. by the State University of New York, and in 2010, he was given the Ian McLellan Hunter Lifetime Achievement Award by the Writers Guild of America, East.

== Personal life ==
Zweibel has been married to his wife Robin since 1979 and they have 3 children and 5 grandchildren.

== Works ==
=== Books ===
- North (1984)
- Bunny Bunny: Gilda Radner – A Sort of Love Story (1994)
- The Other Shulman: A Novel (2007)
- Our Tree Named Steve (2007)
- Clothing Optional: And Other Ways to Read These Stories (2008)
- From the Bottom Drawer of: Alan Zweibel (2011)
- Lunatics, with Dave Barry (2012)
- Benjamin Franklin: Huge Pain In My ____, with Adam Mansbach (2017)
- Benjamin Franklin: You've Got Mail, with Adam Mansbach (2017)
- For this We Left Egypt? with Adam Mansbach and Dave Barry (2017)
- A Field Guide to the Jewish People, with Adam Mansbach and Dave Barry (2019)
- Laugh Lines: My Life Helping Funny People Be Funnier (2020)

=== Films ===
- Gilda Live (with Anne Beatts, Lorne Michaels, Michael O'Donoghue, Marilyn Suzanne Miller, Paul Shaffer, Don Novello and Rosie Shuster) (1980)
- Dragnet (with Dan Aykroyd and Tom Mankiewicz) (1987)
- North (with Andrew Scheinman) (1994) (also producer)
- The Story of Us (with Jessie Nelson) (1999) (also producer)
- Here Today (with Billy Crystal) (2021) (producer and co-writer with Billy Crystal)

=== Unproduced screenplays ===
- Barbarians at the Plate
- Bunny Bunny
- Marrying Mom
- Men Who Lunch
- Once Upon a Time, Inc.
- Teddy Young
- Waiting for Sam to Die

=== Television ===
- Saturday Night Live (1975–1980/1984/1987)
- The Beach Boys: It's OK (1976)
- The Paul Simon Special (1977)
- Steve Martin's Best Show Ever (1981)
- The New Show (1984)
- It's Garry Shandling's Show (1986–1990) (also Co-Creator)
- One of the Boys (1989) (also Creator/Executive Producer)
- Saturday Night Live: 15th Anniversary (1989)
- Good Sports (1991) (also Creator/Executive Producer)
- The Please Watch the Jon Lovitz Special (1992) (also Executive Producer)
- Great Performances: 25th Anniversary Special (with Cy Coleman) (1997)
- I Am Your Child (with Rob Reiner) (1997)
- Curb Your Enthusiasm (2001–2002) (Consulting Producer)
- What Leonard Comes Home To (2002) (Executive Producer)
- 56th Primetime Emmy Awards (2003)
- Monk (2007)
- Late Show with David Letterman (2008–2009)
- Women Without Men (2010)
- 700 Sundays (2014)

=== Broadway ===
- Gilda Live (with Anne Beatts, Lorne Michaels, Michael O'Donoghue, Marilyn Suzanne Miller, Paul Shaffer, Don Novello and Rosie Shuster) (1979) Winter Garden Theatre
- 700 Sundays (with Billy Crystal) (2005 Tony Award Winner) Broadhurst Theatre
- Martin Short: Fame Becomes Me, (with Martin Short) (2006) Bernard B. Jacobs Theatre

=== Off Broadway ===
- Diamonds (1984) Circle in the Square Theatre
- Between Cars (1985) Ensemble Studio Theatre
- Comic Dialogue (1986) Ensemble Studio Theatre
- Bunny, Bunny: Gilda Radner – A Sort of Romantic Comedy (1997) Lucille Lortel Theater
- Happy (2010) 59E59 Theaters, Summer Shorts Festival
- Celebrity Autobiography (2012) Triad Theatre
- Playing God (2017) 59E59 Theaters, Summer Shorts Festival

=== Appearances ===
- Curb: The Discussion
- Curb Your Enthusiasm (as "Duckstein")
- E! True Hollywood Story: Gilda Radner
- Good Morning America
- The Late, Late Show
- Late Night with Conan O'Brien
- Late Show with David Letterman
- Law and Order
- Make 'Em Laugh: The Funny Business of America
- Making Trouble (documentary by Joan Micklin Silver)
- North (as "Coach")
- Politically Incorrect
- Saturday Night Live
- The Story of Us (as "Uncle Shelly")
- The Today Show

=== Stage appearances ===
- A History of Me (2007) U.S. Comedy Arts Festival
- Celebrity Autobiography (2010) Triad Theatre, NYC; Broad Stage, LA

== Awards ==
- (2010) WGAE Ian McLellan Hunter Award for Lifetime Achievement in Writing
- (2006) Thurber Prize for American Humor winner
- (2005) Tony Award for Best Special Theatrical Event 700 Sundays
- (1989) CableACE Award for Best Writing in a Comedy Series in "It's Garry Shandling's Show".
- (1977/78) Emmy for Outstanding Writing Achievement in a Comedy, Variety, or Music Series in "The Paul Simon Special".
- (1977/78) Emmy for Outstanding Writing Achievement in a Comedy, Variety, or Music Series in "NBC's Saturday Night".
- (1976/77) Emmy for Outstanding Writing Achievement in a Comedy, Variety, or Music Series in "NBC's Saturday Night".
- (1975/76) Emmy for Outstanding Writing Achievement in a Comedy, Variety, or Music Series in "NBC's Saturday Night".
