= List of It's Garry Shandling's Show episodes =

It's Garry Shandling's Show is an American sitcom that originally aired on Showtime. It was created by Garry Shandling and Alan Zweibel. The series is notable for breaking the fourth wall. It premiered on September 10, 1986, and ended on May 25, 1990, with a total of 72 episodes over the course of 4 seasons.

== Series overview ==
Season	Episodes	Originally released	
Season	Episodes	First released	Last released
1	16	September 10, 1986	April 10, 1987
2	17	October 25, 1987	March 18, 1988
3	20	October 21, 1988	April 21, 1989
4	19	November 10, 1989	May 25, 1990

== Episodes ==
=== Season 1 (1986–87) ===
No. overall	No. in season	Title	Directed by	Written by	Original release date
1	1	"The Day Garry Moved In"	Alan Rafkin	Alan Zweibel & Garry Shandling	September 10, 1986
Garry Shandling moves into a condo that once belonged to Vanna White and makes a date with the woman who installs his cable.
2	2	"Grant Gets Broken"	Alan Rafkin	Alan Zweibel & Garry Shandling	September 17, 1986
Garry babysits his neighbors' son Grant.
3	3	"Garry Throws a Surprise Party"	Alan Rafkin	Alan Zweibel & Garry Shandling	September 24, 1986
Garry throws a surprise birthday party for his mother that gives her a heart attack, so he seeks solace from Father Guido Sarducci.
4	4	"Foul Ball"	Alan Rafkin	Jack Burns	October 1, 1986
Grant is made a social outcast when his father bungles a foul ball at a Dodgers game hit by Steve Sax.
5	5	"The Graduate"	Alan Rafkin	Alan Zweibel & Garry Shandling	October 8, 1986
In an homage to The Graduate, Garry is seduced by Mrs. Robertson, but he's in love with her daughter. Norman Fell guest stars.
6	6	"It's Garry's Problem, But It's Jo-Jo's Show"	Alan Rafkin	Janis Hirsch	October 15, 1986
Garry is infatuated with a friend of Nancy's, making him completely forget the show's contest winner. Note: This was Geoffrey Blake's final episode as Lewis.
7	7	"Garry Met a Girl Named Maria"	Alan Rafkin	S : Ed Solomon; S/T : Janis Hirsch	January 23, 1987
Garry marries a Guatemalan woman named Maria to save her from deportation.
8	8	"Grant's Date"	Alan Rafkin	Ed Solomon and Jeff Franklin	January 30, 1987
Garry chaperones Grant's date—with unexpected results.
9	9	"Pete Has an Affair"	Alan Rafkin	Alan Zweibel	February 6, 1987
Pete feels guilty over having an affair.
10	10	"Fate"	Alan Rafkin	Ed Solomon	February 13, 1987
Garry tempts fate to prove a psychic's prediction wrong. Astronaut Pete Conrad guest stars.
11	11	"The Morning After"	Alan Rafkin	Jeff Franklin and Alan Zweibel	February 20, 1987
Garry uses his flashback machine to find out what he did at a party the night before that's made everyone so mad.
12	12	"Sarah"	Alan Rafkin	Mac Brandes^{[A]}	March 6, 1987
Garry's ex-girlfriend Sarah stops by asking for a platonic relationship.
13	13	"Laffie"	Alan Rafkin	Alan Zweibel & Garry Shandling	March 13, 1987
Garry adopts a collie and names him Laffie, but Leonard wants Garry to get rid of him.
14	14	"Dial 'L' for Laundry"	Alan Rafkin	Tom Gammill & Max Pross	March 20, 1987
Garry meets a woman named Sylvia at the laundromat.
15	15	"Dinner with Garry"	Alan Rafkin	E.J. Purdum	April 3, 1987
Garry fixes his mother up with his internist, who never calls for a date.
16	16	"Force Boxman"	Alan Rafkin	Jeff Franklin and Ed Solomon	April 10, 1987
Red Buttons takes over the show while Garry is off doing the pilot for his new cop show.

=== Season 2 (1987–88) ===
No. overall	No. in season	Title	Directed by	Written by	Original release date
17	1	"Who's Poppa?"	Alan Rafkin	Alan Zweibel & Garry Shandling	October 25, 1987
Pete wonders if he's the father of Jackie's baby at her baby shower.
18	2	"No Baby, No Show"	Alan Rafkin	Alan Zweibel & Garry Shandling	November 6, 1987
Jackie and Pete wait a long time for the birth of their baby.
19	3	"The Fugitive"	Alan Rafkin	Tom Gammill & Max Pross	November 13, 1987
A friend of Garry's is on the run from the authorities.
20	4	"The Schumakers Go to Hollywood"	Alan Rafkin	Ed Solomon and Tom Gammill & Max Pross	November 20, 1987
Grant wins an essay contest and earns a trip to Hollywood, where he attends a live taping of It's Garry Shandling's Show.
21	5	"Nancy Gets Amnesia"	Alan Rafkin	Marshall Goldberg	November 27, 1987
Nancy develops amnesia and falls for Garry.
22	6	"Angelica: Part 1"	Alan Rafkin	Alan Zweibel & Garry Shandling	December 4, 1987
Garry goes on Love Connection to tell Chuck Woolery about his date with a woman named Angelica.
23	7	"Angelica: Part 2"	Alan Rafkin	Sam Simon and Tom Gammill & Max Pross	December 11, 1987
Garry and Angelica go on their second date to see if their love connection can last.
24	8	"It's Garry Shandling's Christmas Show"	Alan Rafkin	Merrill Markoe	December 17, 1987
Garry plans a Christmas special with Tom Petty, but a present from his mother has apparently been stolen.
25	9	"Killer Routine"	Alan Rafkin	S : Jim Geoghan; T : Alan Zweibel & Garry Shandling	January 8, 1988
Garry's opening monologue causes an audience member to die of laughter.
26	10	"Mr. Sparks"	Alan Rafkin	Tom Gammill & Max Pross	January 15, 1988
Garry visits Shandlingland with his friends to improve relations with his neighbor Mr. Sparks.
27	11	"The Soccer Show"	Alan Rafkin	Alan Zweibel & Garry Shandling	January 22, 1988
Garry volunteers to coach Grant's soccer team, only to deal with rude parents.
28	12	"Our Town"	Alan Rafkin	Alan Zweibel & Garry Shandling	January 29, 1988
While strolling through Sherman Oaks, Garry gets involved in a lovers' quarrel.
29	13	"Save the Planet"	Alan Rafkin	Alan Zweibel and Tom Gammill & Max Pross	February 5, 1988
Garry's ecology teacher Kurtwood Smith visits and shows him a revealing photo of Ruth. Flo & Eddie perform.
30	14	"The Grant Shuffle"	Alan Rafkin	Tom Gammill & Max Pross and Sam Simon	February 12, 1988
Grant aspires to be a standup comic when he feels overshadowed by his baby brother, while Leonard takes an interest in the winner of the baby names contest.
31	15	"Go Go Goldblum"	Alan Rafkin	Tom Gammill & Max Pross and Sam Simon	March 4, 1988
Garry leaves a dinner party with the Schumakers early to attend a party at Jeff Goldblum's house.
32	16	"Garry Falls Down a Hole"	Alan Rafkin	Richard Day	March 11, 1988
Garry sees his life flash before his eyes when he falls down a hole.
33	17	"Mr. Smith Goes to Nam"	Alan Rafkin	Richard Day	March 18, 1988
Leonard has nightmares about Vietnam where he abandoned an old buddy, who happens to run into him; and Garry gets some pets. (Guest star Gilda Radner's last television appearance)

=== Season 3 (1988–89) ===
No. overall	No. in season	Title	Directed by	Written by	Original release date
34	1	"Goin' Places"	Alan Rafkin	Ed Solomon and Tom Gammill & Max Pross	October 21, 1988
Nancy accidentally strands the Schumaker grandparents when she gets a job as a travel agent.
35	2	"Pete's Got a Secret"	Alan Rafkin	Al Jean & Mike Reiss	October 28, 1988
Pete reveals a secret he's kept for so long—and ends up insulting the audience.
36	3	"What's Happening to Me?"	Alan Rafkin	Tom Gammill & Max Pross and Alan Zweibel & Garry Shandling	November 4, 1988
When Tom Bradley visits the show, Garry tries to include singing and dancing to impress him. Meanwhile, as puberty hits Grant, a female classmate pressures him to give up his purity.
37	4	"Live Election Show"	Alan Rafkin	Alan Zweibel and Tom Gammill & Max Pross	November 11, 1988
The election affects the residents of Sherman Oaks as Garry and Don Cornelius give incorrect returns during the show.
38	5	"The Natural"	Alan Rafkin	Al Jean & Mike Reiss	December 2, 1988
Garry joins a ping-pong tournament, despite an incident that ruined his table tennis days 18 years ago.
39	6	"Home Sweet Home"	Alan Rafkin	Ted Bergman	December 30, 1988
The condo association gives Garry a 48-hour eviction notice when they decide his show is a violation of condo rules.
40	7	"Vegas: Part 1"	Alan Rafkin	Ed Solomon	January 6, 1989
The gang goes to Las Vegas for Leonard's wedding.
41	8	"Vegas: Part 2"	Alan Rafkin	Al Jean & Mike Reiss	January 13, 1989
Leonard and his fiancee both realize there's something to discuss before they get married.
42	9	"Save Mr. Peck's: Part 1"	Alan Rafkin	Tom Gammill & Max Pross and Elaine Aronson & Alan Zweibel	February 3, 1989
When Mr. Peck's, the place where Garry got started, could go out of business, Carl Reiner helps Garry find a way to save it.
43	10	"Save Mr. Peck's: Parts 2 & 3"	Alan Rafkin	Tom Gammill & Max Pross and Elaine Aronson & Alan Zweibel	February 10, 1989
44	11	"Save Mr. Peck's: Parts 2 & 3"	Alan Rafkin	Tom Gammill & Max Pross and Elaine Aronson & Alan Zweibel	February 10, 1989
Garry holds a benefit to save Mr. Peck's and enlists Father Guido Sarducci to get Red Buttons, who's had a feud with Mr. Peck for many years.
45	12	"Ruth's Place"	Alan Rafkin	Ziggy Steinberg	February 17, 1989
Ruth opens a pet shop, then has a fight with Garry that puts him in the hospital.
46	13	"Garry Acts Like a Moron"	Alan Rafkin	Al Jean & Mike Reiss	February 24, 1989
When Garry fails his written driving test, his brain talks him into getting more stimulation to improve his thinking skills.
47	14	"Kramer vs. Grant"	Alan Rafkin	Ed Solomon and Tom Gammill & Max Pross	March 3, 1989
Grant is accused of beating up the school bully, but an audience member tells the principal what really happened.
48	15	"Grant Goes to the Dogs"	Alan Rafkin	Elaine Aronson	March 10, 1989
Grant faces a lot of problems when Ruth hires him to work at the pet shop.
49	16	"Big Brother"	Don Mischer	Alan Zweibel and Tom Gammill & Max Pross	March 17, 1989
Garry volunteers for the Big Brother program when he feels jealous of the Schumakers' pregnancy.
50	17	"Going, Going, Gone"	Alan Rafkin	Larry Levin	March 31, 1989
Garry cancels a date with Sheena Easton to prove his commitment to the Big Brothers.
51	18	"Garry Goes Golfing"	Don Mischer	Al Jean & Mike Reiss	April 7, 1989
Martin Mull invites Garry to a golf tournament in Boysville.
52	19	"Mum's the Word"	Don Mischer	Tom Gammill & Max Pross	April 14, 1989
Garry's mom returns to her show business roots, much to his consternation.
53	20	"Worry Wart"	Thomas Schlamme	S : Tom Gammill, Max Pross, Al Jean, & Mike Reiss; T : Alan Zweibel, Garry Shandling, Elaine Aronson, & Larry Levin	April 21, 1989
Garry finds a wart on his neck.

=== Season 4 (1989–90) ===
No. overall	No. in season	Title	Directed by	Written by	Original release date
54	1	"The First Show of the Fourth Season"	Thomas Schlamme	Alan Zweibel & Garry Shandling	November 10, 1989
Garry invites his boss over for dinner to meet Phoebe—with disaventures.
55	2	"Take My Girlfriend, for Example"	David Steinberg	Al Jean & Mike Reiss	November 17, 1989
Garry offends Phoebe with jokes about her on Cristina Ferrare's talk show.
56	3	"Nathan's Sheer Madness"	Art Wolff	Elaine Aronson	November 24, 1989
Grant's friend Ross tries to hack his parents after watching a show called Shear Madness, whose star is angry with Phoebe's protests.
57	4	"SuperGrant"	David Steinberg	Al Jean & Mike Reiss and Alan Zweibel	December 1, 1989
Phoebe suspects that Grant is using steroids to do better at football, so Garry investigates.
58	5	"Dinner at Eddie King's House"	Roy London	Alan Zweibel & Garry Shandling	December 8, 1989
Garry and friends dine at the home of 1950s comic Eddie King, whose stories of his past give his guests visions of their future.
59	6	"The Proposal"	Thomas Schlamme	Larry Levin	January 12, 1990
Garry proposes to Phoebe, then goes to Colorado to meet her father and half-brother.
60	7	"Firehose"	Madeline Cripe	Al Jean & Mike Reiss	January 19, 1990
Garry tries to convince a sponsor he did not do an X-rated film.
61	8	"The Day Howard Moved In"	Art Wolff	Monica Johnson and Garry Shandling	January 26, 1990
To inspire the audience about the innate goodness in people, Garry tells them about the day Howard Sprague moved from Mayberry, North Carolina to the condo.
62	9	"The Wedding Show"	Thomas Schlamme	Alan Zweibel and Larry Levin	February 9, 1990
At the request of the network president, Garry and Phoebe liven up their wedding with musical numbers and guest appearances by Ned Beatty, Charles Nelson Riley, and Connie Stevens.
63	10	"The Honeymoon Show"	Art Wolff	Monica Johnson and Alan Zweibel	February 16, 1990
A series of peculiar deaths lead the Shandlings to believe their wedding is cursed.
64	11	"Shandling vs. Mull"	Thomas Schlamme	Al Jean & Mike Reiss	March 9, 1990
Martin Mull complains to Phoebe about her bill.
65	12	"Leonard Gets Metaphysical"	Art Wolff	John Bowman	March 23, 1990
Garry goes on tour with Guns and Roses, leaving Grant in charge of the show.
66	13	"Chester Gets a Show"	Paul Miller	Elaine Aronson	March 30, 1990
Garry gets jealous when Phoebe's brother Chester gets his own show.
67	14	"My Mother, the Wife"	Art Wolff	Al Jean & Mike Reiss	April 6, 1990
On his anniversary, Garry keeps seeing his mother every time he tries to make love to Phoebe. Former NFL star Lyle Alzado guest stars.
68	15	"Family Man"	Alan Zweibel	Larry Levin	April 13, 1990
To find out if Phoebe's pregnant, Garry uses a time machine to fast forward to the future.
69	16	"Mad at Brad"	Paul Miller	Steve Pepoon	May 4, 1990
Garry's manager gets a new client, Chris Isaak, making Garry feel neglected.
70	17	"The Last Show"	Roy London	Alan Zweibel & Garry Shandling	May 11, 1990
Mr. Death moves into the condo complex causing Garry to die. Bob Newhart, Dabney Coleman, and Tony Danza guest star.
71	18	"The Talent Show"	Renny Temple	John Bowman and Larry Levin	May 18, 1990
The cast does a parody of Phantom of the Opera.
72	19	"Driving Miss Garry"	Stan Lathan	Al Jean & Mike Reiss	May 25, 1990
Dan Aykroyd and Paul Winfield stop by to help Garry end the series.

== Notes ==
A. 'Mac Brandes' is a pseudonym for Larry David.
