= Don Novello =

American comedian and actor (born 1943)

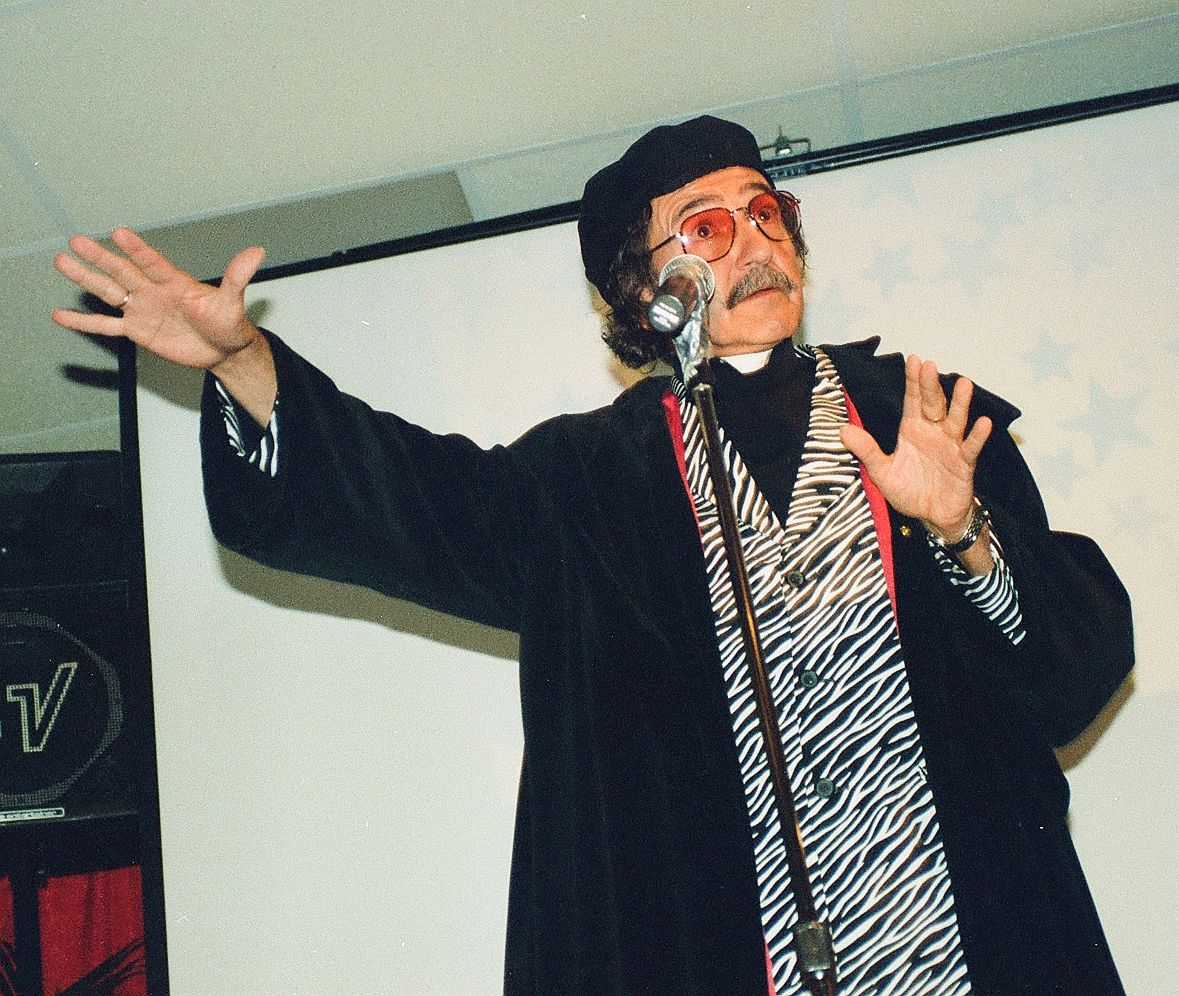
- Novello in 2000
- Born: January 1, 1943 (age 83); Ashtabula, Ohio, U.S.
- Occupations: Comedian; actor; singer; writer; film director; producer
- Years active: 1963–present

Don Novello (born January 1, 1943) is an American comedian, actor, writer, singer, film director and producer.

Novello appeared on NBC's Saturday Night Live as the character Father Guido Sarducci from 1978 to 1980 and 1985 to 1986. He appeared as Sarducci in television shows Married... with Children, Blossom, It's Garry Shandling's Show, Unhappily Ever After, Square Pegs, The Colbert Report and most recently on The Late Show in 2025, as well as in the 1980 film Gilda Live and the 1995 film Casper. He also portrayed Dominic Abbandando in the 1990 film The Godfather Part III and provided the voice of Vincenzo "Vinny" Santorini in the 2001 animated film Atlantis: The Lost Empire.

== Early life ==
Novello was born on January 1, 1943, in Ashtabula, Ohio, the son of Eleanor Eileen Novello (née Finnerty), a nurse, and Augustine Joseph Novello, a physician. He is of Italian and Irish descent.

Novello's family moved to Lorain, Ohio, when he was a child. In 1961, he graduated from Lorain High School. He subsequently enrolled into the University of Dayton, graduating in 1964. In 1965, he graduated with a Bachelor of Foreign Trade degree from the American Graduate School of International Management (today the Thunderbird School of Global Management of Arizona State University).

== Career ==
In the late 1960s, Novello worked as an advertising copywriter for Leo Burnett in Chicago.

Novello created the Father Guido Sarducci character in 1973 after finding a monsignor's outfit for $7.50 at a St. Vincent de Paul thrift shop. Adding sunglasses, a broom mustache, cigarette, and a thick Italian accent, Sarducci became popular in a San Francisco nightclub. Sarducci appeared on San Francisco Channel 20's Chicken Little Comedy Show, and comic David Steinberg was watching. Steinberg hired Novello as a writer for a TV show that never aired, but he also introduced Novello to Tommy and Dick Smothers, and they hired him, too. Novello appeared as Sarducci on the Smothers Brothers Show in 1975. He also was with Pat Paulsen during Paulsen's "Presidential Campaign Tour" in the mid-1970s as his "campaign manager."

In the 1970s, Novello started to write letters to famous people under the pen name Lazlo Toth (after Laszlo Toth, a deranged man who vandalized Michelangelo's Pietà in Rome). The letters, written to suggest a serious but misinformed and obtuse correspondent, were designed to tweak the noses of politicians and corporations. Many of them received serious responses; Novello sometimes continued the correspondence at length, with humorous results. The letters and responses were published in the books The Lazlo Letters, Citizen Lazlo!, and From Bush to Bush: The Lazlo Toth Letters.

The Lazlo Letters caught the attention of Lorne Michaels, producer of Saturday Night Live. Novello was hired as a writer for the show's third season in 1977–1978, remained through the fifth season, and returned as a writer in the eleventh season. He also appeared as Sarducci numerous times on the show.

In 1980, under the name Father Guido Sarducci, he sang lead vocals on the Warner Bros. Records release "I Won't Be Twisting This Christmas"/"Parco MacArthur" (WBS49627). Novello co-wrote the first tune with M. Davich, and the second is an Italian-language cover of Jimmy Webb's song "MacArthur Park", in an arrangement similar to that recorded by Richard Harris.

Novello made newspapers around the world when he visited the Vatican in 1981 wearing the Sarducci costume and, while taking photographs for a magazine article in an area where photography was prohibited, was arrested by the Swiss Guards along with his photographer (Paul Solomon), and eventually charged with "impersonating a priest". The charges were later dropped and Solomon saved the film from confiscation.

In his stage show in Las Vegas and Reno with the Smothers Brothers, Sarducci rolled a wheelchair with a dummy in the robes of a cardinal. In the act, Sarducci explained he was the assistant of 108-year-old "Cardinal Dario Fungi".

For a brief period in 1982, Novello was a producer on SCTV, a Toronto-based comedy show starring Martin Short, Joe Flaherty, John Candy, Eugene Levy, Dave Thomas, Rick Moranis, Andrea Martin and Catherine O'Hara. He was installed by NBC as one of a series of producers for the show's fourth season, and produced a total of nine episodes.

In 1983, Novello appeared as Sarducci in the video for Rodney Dangerfield's comedy rap song "Rappin' Rodney", which was heavily played on MTV.

In 1984 Novello wrote The Blade, a high school yearbook parody in which the students are represented by sheep. Novello co-wrote the unfilmed script for Noble Rot with John Belushi. He also narrated Faerie Tale Theatre's third-season episode Pinocchio with Paul Reubens as the titular puppet. Also in 1984, Novello appeared in the video for Jefferson Starship's song "No Way Out".

In 1989, Novello co-starred in the anthology film New York Stories in the Francis Ford Coppola-directed segment, Life Without Zoe. In his 2 1/2 star review of the film, Roger Ebert wrote that Novello gave "the most engaging performance in the movie."

In 1990, Novello portrayed Dominic Abbandando in the film The Godfather Part III. Abbandando appears with speaking lines in the first scene as public relations and media coordinator for Don Michael Corleone. He also appears other scenes, shadowing George Hamilton, and in the climactic scene on the steps of the Palermo opera house, Teatro Massimo.

In the early 2000s, Novello voiced Vinny Santorini in the Disney film Atlantis: The Lost Empire and its direct-to-video sequel, Atlantis: Milo's Return. In 2003, he filed papers to enter the 2003 California gubernatorial recall election, but did not collect enough valid signatures to qualify for the ballot.

In 2005, after Pope John Paul II died, Novello, as Sarducci, reprised his former SNL role as "Special Vatican Reporter" for Air America Radio host (and fellow Saturday Night Live alumnus) Al Franken. He continued this role until the election of Pope Benedict XVI. In 2006, he portrayed Galileo on the podcast "The Radio Adventures of Dr. Floyd".

Novello portrayed Pope Pius XII in the 2009 short film All in the Bunker.

On June 23, 2010, Novello appeared as Sarducci on The Colbert Report. On May 6, 2025, he reprised his appearance in an interview with Colbert about the upcoming papal conclave.

On October 30, 2010, he gave the benediction at the Rally to Restore Sanity and/or Fear hosted by Jon Stewart and Stephen Colbert.

American recording artist Guthrie Thomas called Novello "the best performer in the room" when he appeared as Sarducci on one of Thomas's albums in a recording studio full of famous performers.

== Personal life ==
Novello resides in San Anselmo, California. His former sister-in-law, Antonia Novello, was Surgeon General of the United States from 1990 to 1993. His niece is film producer Holly Wiersma (Wonderland, Billionaire Boys Club).

== Selected filmography ==
=== Film ===
| Year | Title | Role | Notes |
|---|---|---|---|
| 1979 | Mr. Mike's Mondo Video | Man in Film Room | Uncredited |
| 1980 | Gilda Live | Father Guido Sarducci | Also writer |
| 1985 | Head Office | Sal | |
| 1985 | Father Guido Sarducci Goes to College | Guido Sarducci | Direct-to-video; also writer |
| 1988 | Tucker: The Man and His Dream | Stan | |
| 1989 | New York Stories | Hector | Segment: "Life Without Zoe" |
| 1990 | The Spirit of '76 | Translator | |
| 1990 | The Godfather Part III | Dominic Abbandando | |
| 1993 | Teenage Bonnie and Klepto Clyde | Sanchez | |
| 1995 | One Night Stand | Warren Miller | |
| 1995 | Casper | Guido Sarducci | |
| 1996 | Jack | Bartender | |
| 1997 | Touch | Father Navaroli | |
| 1998 | Just the Ticket | Tony | |
| 2000 | The Adventures of Rocky and Bullwinkle | Fruit Vendor | |
| 2000 | Just One Night | Italian Drifter | |
| 2000 | Nothing Sacred | Caterer | |
| 2001 | Atlantis: The Lost Empire | Vinny Santorini (voice) | |
| 2003 | Atlantis: Milo's Return | Vinny Santorini (voice) | Direct-to-video |
| 2006 | Factory Girl | Mort Silvers | |
| 2011 | Twixt | Melvin | |
| 2013 | Palo Alto | Mr. Wilson | |

=== Television ===
| Year | Title | Role | Notes |
|---|---|---|---|
| 1978–1980, 1985–1986 | Saturday Night Live | Father Guido Sarducci | Recurring role; also writer |
| 1982 | Square Pegs | Father Guido Sarducci | Episode: "Pac-Man Fever" |
| 1986, 1989 | It's Garry Shandling's Show | Father Guido Sarducci | 2 episodes |
| 1991 | Great Performances | Father Guido Sarducci | Episode: "La Pastorela: The Shepherd's Tale" |
| 1993 | Blossom | Father Guido Sarducci | Episode: "Kiss and Tell" |
| 1995 | Married... with Children | Father Guido Sarducci | Episode: "Requiem for a Dead Briard" |
| 1998–2000 | Histeria! | Leonardo da Vinci (voice) | 4 episodes |
| 2005 | Rent Control | Rico | Television film |
| 2010 | The Colbert Report | Guido Sarducci | Episode: "Tim Westergren" |
| 2025 | The Late Show with Stephen Colbert | Father Guido Sarducci | May 6, 2025 episode |

== Writing credits ==
- The Smothers Brothers Show (1975) (TV)
- Van Dyke and Company (1976) (TV)
- Things We Did Last Summer (1978) (TV)
- SCTV (1982) (TV)
- Noble Rot (with John Belushi) (1982) (unproduced)
- A Man Called Sporacaione (1982) (unproduced)
- Blondes vs. Brunettes (with Lisa Medway) (1984) (TV)
- Our Planet Tonight (1987) (TV)

== Bibliography ==
- The Lazlo Letters (1977)
- The Blade: Shellville High School Yearbook (1984)
- Citizen Lazlo!: The Lazlo Letters Vol. 2 (1992)
- From Bush to Bush: The Lazlo Toth Letters (2003)

== Albums ==
- Father Guido Sarducci Live at St. Douglas Convent (1980)
- Breakfast in Heaven (1986) as Father Guido Sarducci
- Everybody's Free to Wear Camouflage (2000) (CD Single) written by Cat McLean, Don Novello and Narada Michael Walden, which was a top 20 hit in the UK. Performed as Father Guido Sarducci
- One Hundred Bulbs on the Christmas Tree Party (2006) as Father Guido Sarducci

Appeared on the compilations Holidays in Dementia (1995) and A Classic Rock Christmas (2002). He made guest appearances on the Handsome Boy Modeling School albums So... How's Your Girl? (1999) and White People (2004).
