= Carrie Manolakos =

American actress and musician (born 1984)

- Born: February 16, 1984 (age 42); Syracuse, New York, U.S.
- Education: Tisch School of the Arts
- Occupations: Singer-songwriter, actress
- Years active: 2008–present
- Height: 5 ft 2 in (157 cm)
- Website: www.carriemanolakos.com

Carrie Manolakos (pronounced "men-uh-LAH-kiss"; born February 16, 1984) is an American singer-songwriter and musical theatre actress. As an actress, she is perhaps best known for her stage work, on Broadway in Mamma Mia! as Sophie Sheridan, and in the original 2nd national tour cast of Wicked as the Elphaba standby. She became an internet sensation after her cover of the Radiohead song "Creep" went viral after it was picked up by Gawker Media, under the title "Eargasm". The cover was performed at her album release party at Le Poisson Rouge in Greenwich Village.

== Early life and education ==
Manolakos grew up in Syracuse, New York and attended Manlius Pebble Hill School. At age 10, she began participating in the community theater at Syracuse Stage. Manolakos attended the Tisch School of the Arts at NYU.

== Career ==
=== 2008–2011: Mamma Mia!, Wicked, and other stage work ===
Manolakos performed in the ensemble of the Mamma Mia! tour for six months before being promoted to the role of Sophie. Shortly after that, she was invited to join the Broadway company, replacing Carey Anderson. She gave her first performance on June 4, 2008. She appeared in “Spare Some Change: NYC Artists for Barack Obama” directed by Ryan Mekenian in 2008 alongside Shaina Taub, Seth Rudetsky, Joe Iconis, Lindsay Mendez, & Celia Keenan-Bolger. It was announced on February 9, 2009, that Manolakos would be joining the second national tour of Wicked as the standby for Elphaba. On June 25, 2010, Manolakos performed at the Yale Institute for Music Theatre Workshops as Athena in The Daughters, a musical which follows the three daughters of Zeus as they embark on separate and intersecting journeys of self-discovery. Manolakos performed in a concert celebrating Alanis Morissette on September 1, 2010. On November 1, 2010, Manolakos joined Peter Lerman for his debut concert at the Laurie Beechman Theatre, featuring tunes from his original songbook. It was announced on December 3, 2010, that Manolakos would be involved in a concert featuring the music from the musical Jawbreaker. The concert took place on December 12, 2010. Manolakos took part in a concert at Joe's Pub on March 27, 2011, celebrating the release of Joey Contreras debut album, Love Me, Love Me Not. Manolakos appeared as Night Terrors in at the La Jolla Playhouse production of Sleeping Beauty Wakes from July 19 through August 21, 2011. On September 7, 2011, it was announced that Manolakos would be starring as Katie in the rock musical Chix 6 at the Queens Theatre from September 27 to October 30, 2011.

=== 2012–2014: Echo, viral video, and Hit List ===
Manolakos starred as Marianne Reilly in the first run of Seth Rudetsky's Disaster! at Triad Theatre, now renamed Stage 72, on January 22 through March 25, 2012. On February 27, 2012, Manolakos took part in Broadway Remembers Whitney Houston at Joe's Pub, a tribute concert for the late singer. Manolakos performed at Broadway Rhythm and Booze alongside Uzo Aduba on March 26, 2012. Manolakos released her debut album, Echo, on April 2, 2012, produced by Dominick Amendum and Justin Goldner. The album debuted in the top 100 of the iTunes pop charts. On April 23, 2012, Manolakos became an internet sensation when her cover of "Creep" by Radiohead went viral. It was picked up by Huffington Post, The Daily Beast, The New Yorker, and Gawker, under the title "Eargasm." Manolakos took part in Broadway Sings Adele on April 30, 2012. She performed Someone Like You. Manolakos was profiled as No. 1 of ELLE's 30 Under 30: The Essential Names to Know. Manolakos participated in Signature Theatre's Sizzlin Summer Cabaret on July 27, 2012. Manolakos took part in a private reading of QUILT: A Musical Celebration at Rosie O'Donnell's Maravel Arts Center on June 20, 2012. Manolakos performed at Dream the Impossible Dream from July 14 through 22, 2012. On November 26, 2012, Manolakos performed at a concert benefit titled City of Hope: Broadway Blows Back to aid New York and New Jersey communities affected by Hurricane Sandy. On December 31, 2012, she briefly appeared onstage with Phish performing "Tweezer Reprise". Manolakos performed with Lorna Luft at Birdland Jazz Club on February 18, 2013 Manolakos appeared as Lizzie Borden in Theatre Under The Stars's production of Lizzie in October 2013. In 2013 Manolakos led Hit List, a concert based on a fictional musical created for the television series Smash. Manolakos took over for Katharine McPhee. Manolakos performed in Broadway Battles Bullying on April 14, 2014 at Skirball Center for the Performing Arts. Manolakos and Morgan Karr presented a duo-concert at Landmark Vineyards as part of the Transcendence Artist Series on August 1 and 2, 2014.

=== 2015–present: continued success and second album ===
On February 6, 2015, a demo from Frank Wildhorn's Death Note: The Musical was released. The demo featured Manolakos and Eric Anderson. Manolakos started a PledgeMusic to fund her second album in March 2015. She reached her goal on May 18, 2015. Manolakos performed in Broadway Sings Sam Smith on April 5, 2015 at 54 Below. In a collaboration with Wharton Center and the Michigan State University Department of Theater, Manolakos appeared as Florence in Chess alongside MSU and high school students. On May 21, 2015, Manolakos took part in NBC's The Red Nose Day Special, performing alongside Peter Dinklage and Coldplay. On June 15, 2015, Manolakos appeared alongside Hit List co-star Jeremy Jordan in The Wizard & I: The Songs of Stephen Schwartz. On February 11, 2016, Manolakos took part in a reading alongside Cynthia Erivo and Keala Settle for The Greatest Showman on Earth, starring Hugh Jackman. Manolakos' second album, "The 44th Chord," was released on May 3, 2019.

== Discography ==
- 2007: Take Two (Original Demo Cast Recording)
- 2008: Factory Girls: The Songs of Wood and Steel (Original Demo Cast Recording)
- 2010: Love Me, Love Me Not: The Music of Joey Contreras
- 2011: Thirteen Stories Down : The Songs of Jonathan Reid Gealt
- 2011: Time Between Us (Original Demo Cast Recording)
- 2012: Echo
- 2012: "The Nothing" – Single
- 2012: "Creep (Live at (Le)Poisson Rouge)" – Single
- 2013: Hit List (Original Concert Cast EP)
- 2013: Kerrigan-Lowdermilk Live
- 2013: Lizzie (Original Studio Cast Recording)
- 2015: Death Note: The Musical (Original Demo Cast Recording)
- 2019: The 44th Chord
