= HBMS =

HBMS may refer to:

- Handsome Boy Modeling School, a hip-hop duo
- His Britannic Majesty's Ship, an obsolete title for Royal Navy warships.
- Hollis Brookline Middle School
