= Celebrity Autobiography: In Their Own Words (play) =

1998 play by Eugene Pack

- Original language: English
- Written by: Eugene Pack
- Characters: various
- Genre: Comedy

Premiere
- Place: Book Soup; Los Angeles
- Official website

Celebrity Autobiography: In Their Own Words is an entertainment created by Eugene Pack, consisting of comically ironic verbatim readings of memoirs of, and a few poems by, celebrities. Critic Charles Isherwood called it "a merry compendium of the witlessness and wisdom of the rich and famous". A later version was titled Celebrity Autobiography: The Next Chapter.

== Production history ==
The show was created in 1998 in Los Angeles and became prominent as a 2005 Bravo Network one-hour television special of the same name. It was mounted off-Broadway at the Triad Theater beginning in 2008 and has run weekly or monthly since then. At the Triad, Pack has served as the host, and the show has featured Will Forte, Kristen Johnston, Tony Roberts and Rachel Dratch, among others. The show won the 2009 Drama Desk Award for Unique Theatrical Experience. According to the production's official website, as of 2011 it had run in New York for three sold-out years.

The entertainment has been staged in over a dozen cities. It is currently running in New York City, Los Angeles, London and Minneapolis, and a national tour has been announced. London and Los Angeles runs were sold out.

== Description ==
The show features solo and ensemble memoirs, poetry and other writings by authors such as Ivana Trump, Vanna White, Mr. T, Tommy Lee, Sylvester Stallone, 'N Sync, Madonna, Burt Reynolds and Loni Anderson, as well as the lesser-known works of Elizabeth Taylor, Eddie Fisher and Debbie Reynolds. KPBS told its readers to imagine Marion Ross and Paul Michael as Pamela Anderson and Tommy Lee, to get a feel for what the show is all about. At times, related biographies are interwoven, such as passages from Burt Reynolds' and his wife Loni Anderson's memoirs, spiced up with one of Reynolds' assistant's memoirs as well as that of another of Anderson's lovers. The show uses a rotating cast of readers, and it uses material from an ever-growing list of books. The New York Times describes the show as a Rashomon-esque playlet.

== Awards and nominations ==
Award	Outcome
2009 Drama Desk Awards
Unique Theatrical Experience	Won
2010 Bistro Awards
Comedy Series	Won
