= Father Guido Sarducci =

Fictional character on Saturday Night Live

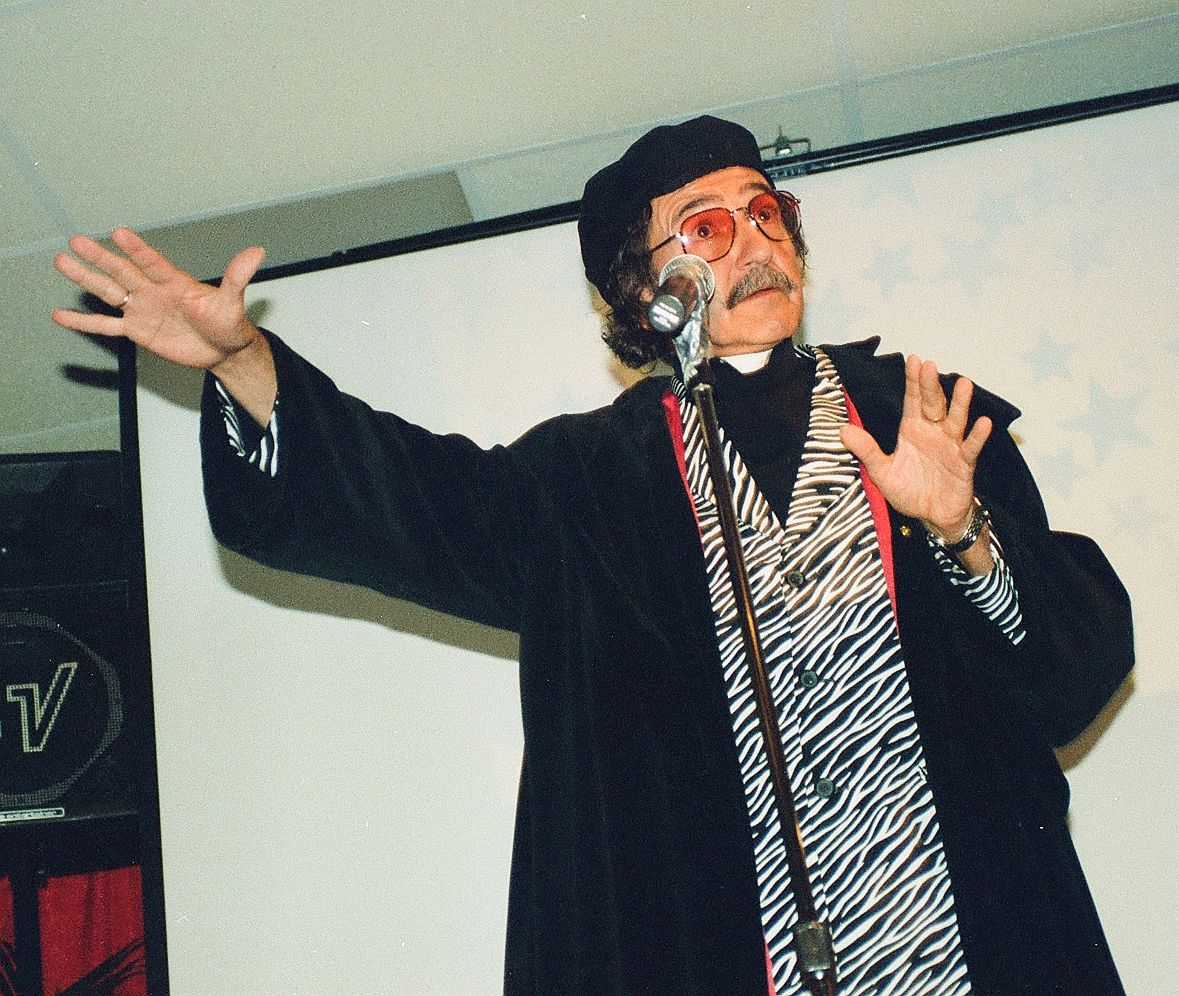
- Don Novello performing as Father Guido Sarducci, 2000
- Created by: Don Novello
- Portrayed by: Don Novello

In-universe information
- Species: Human
- Occupation: Priest, columnist

Father Guido Sarducci is a fictional character created by American comedian Don Novello.

Sarducci is a chain-smoking priest with tinted glasses, who works in the United States as gossip columnist and rock critic for the Vatican newspaper L'Osservatore Romano (sometimes mentioned as The Vatican Enquirer, inspired by the American National Enquirer tabloid). When Performing as Sarducci, Novello delivers absurd or irreverent takes on religion, politics, and everyday life in a deadpan, pseudo-authoritative tone.

== Description ==
Novello created the character in 1973, after he purchased the outfit (consisting of big floppy black hat, white clerical collar, and a long, red-trimmed black coat with cape) for $7.50 at a St. Vincent de Paul Thrift Store. The character was featured in 1970s cartoons by the underground cartoonists Dave Sheridan and Fred Schrier, appearing in person in the early 1970s on Rowan & Martin's Laugh-In and later in the 1975 The Smothers Brothers Comedy Hour. His most prominent appearances were on Saturday Night Live in the late 1970s, during which time Novello was also a writer for the show. In the late 1970s, Father Guido Sarducci was featured on radio commercials for High Times magazine, where he offered to perform blessings for a fee.

== Broadcast history ==
Father Guido Sarducci appeared on The Smothers Brothers Show in 1975 during George Carlin's news update segment. He reported on a scandal about wine not being aged properly and signed off noting he was going to a 106-year-old cardinal's birthday party and had arranged for the cardinal's mother to jump out of the cake.

On his first appearance on Saturday Night Live, a sketch called "How to Pay for Your Sins" on a 1978 episode hosted by Richard Dreyfuss, he was on crutches from an injury suffered during a dress rehearsal sketch about hockey players. Most of his appearances on SNL have been on Weekend Update, including one where he reported that "The take at the shrines in Italy has gone down", which he suggested correcting by creating "Shrinemobiles" and thus taking the shrines to where the people were, and another where he is sent to London to try to wake up Paul McCartney at 4:30 in the morning (11:30 p.m. in New York) by throwing coins, obnoxiously singing The Beatles and Wings songs, and finally, throwing a rock at the window—he says it works every time.

=== Saturday Night Live ===
Sarducci appeared in four cold opens in the 1979–1980 season (on episodes hosted by Steve Martin, Teri Garr, Elliott Gould, and Rodney Dangerfield), two commercial parodies ("MX-5 Tampons" on the 1981–1982 Christmas episode hosted by Bill Murray and "Bocce Ball My Way" on the last episode of the 1985–1986 season hosted by Anjelica Huston and Billy Martin), and two monologues on the 1985–86 season (the first hosted by Madonna in a pretaped sketch showing Madonna's wedding to Sean Penn (played by Robert Downey Jr.) and the second on the Christmas episode of the 1985–86 season hosted by Garr as Sarducci's alter ego, Pope Maurice).

Sarducci also hosted two SNL episodes during the 1983–1984 season (when Dick Ebersol was executive producer) and cameoed during two 1990s episodes, most notably on a Weekend Update segment where he reports on Pope John Paul II's missing wallet. Father Guido Sarducci has 31 appearances on SNL, the most of any of the recurring characters.

=== Vatican visit ===
In 1981 Novello made newspaper headlines when he visited Vatican City wearing the Father Guido Sarducci costume to do a photo shoot for Time magazine. After taking pictures in an area where photography was prohibited, he and his photographer, Paul Solomon, were arrested by the Papal Swiss Guards and Novello was charged with "impersonating a priest". Although the guards attempted to confiscate the film from the shoot, Solomon managed to hand them the wrong film. The charges were later dropped. In the early 1980s, Novello was featured in advertisements promoting candidates for the priesthood. He listed one advantage of being a priest as getting first pick at the annual parish garage sale.

=== Other media appearances ===
During the 1980s and 1990s Sarducci appeared on other television shows, including Fridays, Late Night with David Letterman, The Tonight Show Starring Johnny Carson, Married... with Children, Unhappily Ever After, Blossom, It's Garry Shandling's Show, the Tales of the City miniseries, and Square Pegs. In 1980, Sarducci appeared in Gilda Live, a film and an album recording based on Gilda Radner's successful one-woman show that had been playing on Broadway. In 1983, he appeared in a music video for the Rodney Dangerfield song "Rappin' Rodney", where he gave Rodney his last rites on death row, and helped himself to Rodney's french fries from his last meal. In 1984, he appeared in a music video for the Jefferson Starship song "No Way Out". In 1995, he appeared as a priest trying to perform an exorcism in the movie Casper. The same movie featured a cameo by his fellow SNL alumnus Dan Aykroyd as the Ghostbuster Ray Stantz. In episode 11 of season four of Archer, "Papal Chase", Archer goes undercover at the Vatican, dressed exactly like Guido Sarducci.

=== Albums ===
He appeared on the 2002 album A Classic Rock Christmas performing the song "Santa's Lament" featuring Joe Walsh and Joe Vitale.

The character also appeared on the Handsome Boy Modeling School albums So... How's Your Girl? and White People, telling biographical stories of the life of a professional male model in the latter. Novello also released two comedy albums as Sarducci: Breakfast in Heaven and Live at St. Douglas Convent.

=== Additional appearances ===
He also appeared on the MSNBC show Countdown with Keith Olbermann on March 19, 2005, discussing The Da Vinci Code and his DaVinci Code Decoder Ring.

In the 2001 Disney animated film Atlantis: The Lost Empire, Novello uses the voice and speech style of Father Sarducci to portray the character of demolitions expert Vinny Santorini.

Sarducci made a guest appearance on the April 30, 2005, broadcast of NPR and Chicago Public Radio's Wait Wait... Don't Tell Me! news quiz show, commenting on the ascension of Pope Benedict XVI. He also gave the prayer of invocation at an April 11, 2007, roast of UConn Huskies women's basketball coach Geno Auriemma at the Aqua Turf Club in Southington, Connecticut sponsored by Connecticut Public Television.

He appeared on The Colbert Report on June 23, 2010, claiming to have conducted an interview with Glenn Beck while visiting the Vatican. Later that year, October 30, 2010, he delivered the benediction at the Stewart/Colbert Rally to Restore Sanity and/or Fear from the National Mall in Washington, D.C. He was wearing his classic white clerical collar, a long red-trimmed black coat with cape, zebra vest/jacket and black beret.

On May 6, 2025, he appeared on The Late Show with Stephen Colbert to discuss the upcoming conclave following the death of Pope Francis, where he claimed that Francis's predecessor Pope Benedict XVI was still alive, would be named the next Pope, and would take the name "Pope Benedict XVI the Second".

== See also ==
- List of recurring Saturday Night Live characters and sketches
- Saturday Night Live characters appearing on Weekend Update
