= Breakfast in Heaven =

Live album by Father Guido Sarducci
- Released: 1986
- Genre: Comedy
- Label: Warner Brothers

Father Guido Sarducci chronology
Live at St. Douglas Convent (1981)	Breakfast in Heaven (1986)

Breakfast in Heaven is a comedy album by Father Guido Sarducci (Don Novello), released in 1986 by Warner Brothers. It was recorded at Washington Hall, University of Notre Dame. It was Novello's second album.

== Critical reception ==
The Fresno Bee called the album "funny and well-done, with one very annoying flaw ... the laughs that follow each gag are clipped, obviously cut short in the studio." The San Francisco Chronicle wrote that "Novello is an underrated comic, maybe because his style is so understated, but there's not a wasted moment on this clever, hilarious album."

== Side one ==
- Father Sarducci is welcomed to the University of Notre Dame and recalls the early years of the institution.
- Doo Dah history, folklore and myth.
- The pros and cons of singing about beer on buses are examined.
- How singing the short version of "Happy Birthday" can add six to seven minutes to your life, the candles on the cake, and a look at Ronald Reagan's neck.
- Central American Policy is discussed and arguments are made to bomb Canada.

== Side two ==
- Father Sarducci looks forward to the 90's and unveils plans for the upcoming Columbus Cinquecentennial in 1992.
- Divorced lookalikes, emergency umbrellas and the missing commandments are highlighted in a preview of The Vatican Enquirer.
- Breakfast in Heaven.
- Father Sarducci answers questions from the audience about wearing black, the confessional and birth control for dogs.
- A medley of Beatles tunes.
