= Secrets Every Smart Traveler Should Know =

- Logo
- Music: Douglas Bernstein; Lesley Davison; Stan Freeman; Dave Frishberg; Murray Grand; Jay Leonhart; Nick Santa Maria
- Lyrics: Douglas Bernstein; Lesley Davison; Addy Fieger; Stan Freeman; Dave Frishberg; Murray Grand; Glen Kelly; Jay Leonhart; Denis Markell; Nick Santa Maria
- Book: Barry Creyton; Lesley Davison; Stan Freeman
- Basis: Wendy Perrin's Secrets Every Smart Traveler Should Know
- Productions: 1997 Triad Theater; 1999 Ibis Supper Club

Secrets Every Smart Traveler Should Know is a musical comedy revue that ran Off-Broadway from 1997 to 2000. The revue was produced by Scott Perrin and based on a Fodor's travel guide of the same title written by Scott's sister, Wendy Perrin. The musical depicts travel woes through songs and sketches. The head writer, Lesley Davison, was not only a comedy writer for "Laugh-In" and many other TV and live productions, but she was also Scott and Wendy's mother.

The show's European premiere was in Cambridge, UK at the Playroom at Cambridge Arts Theatre, presented by the Cambridge University Musical Theatre Society.

== Original Off-Broadway production ==
After a one week developmental production at Lucille Lortel's White Barn Theater in Westport, Connecticut, Secrets Every Smart Traveler Should Know opened Off-Broadway at the Triad Theater on October 30, 1997. The cast included James Darrah, Kathy Fitzgerald, Stan Freeman, Jay Leonhart, Liz McConahay and Michael McGrath.

In 1998, the show transferred from the Triad Theater to the Ibis Supper Club. The show ran for a total of 953 performances before closing in February, 2000.

== Synopsis ==
=== Act one ===
The flight attendant (LIZ) announces the beginning of the show and instructs the audience to "fasten their seatbelts, it's going to be a bumpy night". The cast sings "I've Got A Secret", introducing the audience to the perils of travel and some savvy tips to avoid the pitfalls.

A distraught business traveler (JAMES) appears to be naked except for undershorts or a towel around his waist. In "Naked in Pittsburgh", he laments the state and whereabouts of his luggage.

Next, we see a hip and happy traveler (MICHAEL) on the phone with an automated reservationist (KATHY). The reservationist guides an increasingly frustrated traveler through options and automated loops until finally, the weary traveler's time limit expires, and he is disconnected.

In "Star Search", an excited passenger (LIZ) sings about the riveting talent in the cruise ship talent show.

Then, JAY details the unusual items he's managed to pick up from his travels. In "Customs", he can't understand why officials are giving him such a hard time.

A car renter (MICHAEL) laments his exorbitant car rental bill with a sexy Hertz reservations clerk (LIZ) in "Hertz".

A tourist (KATHY) in "Acapulco" sings about the stunning and handsome souvenirs she brought back from her vacation.

Then, in the high style of a Noël Coward play, Amanda (LIZ) and Elyot (JAMES), two ex-spouses, are horrified to find out that they share adjoining balconies with each other on their current honeymoons. As a faint piano plays strains of "Someday I'll Find You", Amanda and Elyot reminisce about the past and talk of their current loves.

Next, MICHAEL and KATHY are dressed to resemble the husband and wife in the Grant Wood painting, American Gothic. They sing about the joys and challenges of "Seeing America First".

JAMES tries to remember what he left behind in "What Did I Forget?".

In "Reservations: Part 2," our hip and anxious traveler (MICHAEL) tries another go with the automated reservationist (KATHY). He ends up holding for the next available operator.

A French chanteuse (LIZ) sings about her lover and his little idiosyncrasies in "The French Song" while (KATHY) translates.

An elegant gambler (MICHAEL), a loud housewife (KATHY), a kid with a lollipop (LIZ), and an old man with a cane (JAMES) sing about their favorite part of cruise-ship life in "Buffet".

=== Act Two ===
The cast encourages the audience to see the wonders of the world before it all comes crumbling down in "See It Now".

Then we see MICHAEL asleep near the phone as canned music plays in the background. The automated receptionist asks him to continue to hold and asserts that his call is important.

A sad and forlorn country and western girl (LIZ) sings an ode to "Mr. Trailways" and tells of her illicit love gone wrong in "Please Mr. Trailways".

Carmen Miranda (KATHY) and two jungle-outfitted men sing about their tropical island and its pressing problem in "Red Hot Lava".

STAN sings about the love he feels for his special island, Uzbekistan, in "Paradise Found".

A tourist (LIZ) has a run-in with a fierce-looking border guard on her first vacation in years.

In "Me and Margarita", JAY laments the unhappy situation of bringing back more than he gastronomically bargained for on his nine-day eating and drinking spree in Mexico.

After a brief message from the captain of an Air India flight, a member of the cast sets a candelabra on the piano. The rest of the cast follows her and gathers around the piano to sing "Salzburg", a bright number extolling the virtues and vices of Mozart and his festival in Salzburg.

MICHAEL awakes as Sharon (KATHY), a real, live operator, finally answers the phone. Sharon (KATHY) flirts with MICHAEL as she suggestively takes his details for his flight to Nome, Alaska. She has almost completed the reservation when she begins to repeat herself over and over, and MICHAEL is unsure of whether she was a real person or not.

JAMES sings about the joys of flying in "Aging Planes".

A shy and unassuming man with a lisp (MICHAEL) sings about his perfect match; a woman he met on his vacation to Spain in "She Spoke Spanish".

LIZ gives us another travel secret. This one is about finding the best travel agent. Then three savvy, high-powered travel agents (JAMES, MICHAEL, and KATHY) all compete for the best deals for their customers in "Honey, Sweetie, Baby".

The cast reminds us of the importance to "See it Now (Reprise)" before the wonders of the world disappear.

As the cast finishes their bows, they sing about their favorite place toward which to travel, "Home".

== Song list ==
Act one

- Secrets Every Smart Traveler Should Know
- Travel Secret #1
- Naked In Pittsburgh
- Reservations #1
- Star Search
- Customs
- Hertz
- This Is Your Captain Speaking #1
- Acapulco
- Private Wives
- Seeing America First
- What Did I Forget?
- Reservations #2
- The French Song
- Buffet

Act two

- See It Now
- Reservations #3
- This Is Your Captain Speaking #2
- Please, Mr. Trailways, Take Me Away
- This Is Your Captain Speaking #3
- Red Hot Lava
- Travel Secret #109
- Paradise
- Border Guard
- Me And Margherita
- This Is Your Captain Speaking #4
- Salzburg
- Reservations #4
- Aging Planes
- She Spoke Spanish
- Honey, Sweetie, Baby
- This Is Your Captain Speaking #5
- See It Now
- Home

== Cast recording ==
A cast recording was released on June 1, 1999, under the RCA Victor label. It featured the cast that transferred originally to the Ibis Supper Club theater including the vocal talents of Charles Alterman, Ray DeMattis, Maribeth Graham, Jay Leonhart, Nick Santa Maria and Denise Nolin.

Recorded February 1-2, 1999 at Manhattan Beach Recording Studios, N.Y. Recording Engineer: Danny Lawrence Mastered by Jon M. Samuels at BMG Studios, New York City Mastering Engineer: Marian M. Conaty Secrets Every Smart Traveler Should Know opened at Triad Theatre on October 30, 1997, and moved to the IBIS Theatre on November 25, 1998. Cover Art/Logo: Peter Galperin Art Direction/Design: Caroline Ulrich Photographer: Jack Vartoogian A&R Direction for RCA Victor: Bill Rosenfield
