= Gilda Live =

1980 film by Mike Nichols

- Theatrical release poster
- Directed by: Mike Nichols
- Written by: Anne Beatts; Lorne Michaels; Marilyn Suzanne Miller; Don Novello; Michael O'Donoghue; Gilda Radner; Paul Shaffer; Rosie Shuster; Alan Zweibel
- Produced by: Lorne Michaels
- Starring: Gilda Radner
- Cinematography: Ted Churchill
- Edited by: Ellen Hovde
- Production company: Broadway Productions
- Distributed by: Warner Bros. Pictures
- Release date: March 28, 1980 (United States)
- Running time: 96 minutes
- Country: United States
- Language: English

Gilda Live is a 1980 American comedy musical film starring Gilda Radner, directed by Mike Nichols and produced by Lorne Michaels. Radner, Michaels, and all of the writers involved with the production were alumni from the television program Saturday Night Live.

== Summary ==
Gilda Live is a filmed version of the comedic one-woman show performance of Gilda Radner Live on Broadway, performed at Broadway's Winter Garden Theatre in 1979. Originally titled Gilda Radner: Live from New York, it was renamed Gilda Live for the film debut. The theatrical production was successful, but the film itself and the record album as well, both released in March 1980, were flops with critics and the public. Gilda Live was shot in Boston a few weeks before the start of Saturday Night Live's fifth season in 1979. It was decided not to film it in New York because of union problems. Additional footage was shot at The Brooklyn Academy of Music in December 1979.

The film itself was a collection of Radner's most popular Saturday Night Live characters and sketches. It included Roseanne Roseannadanna, Emily Litella, Candy Slice, Judy Miller, Lisa Loopner, Nadia Comăneci, and Rhonda Weiss, and many other skits and performances. These include "Let's Talk Dirty to the Animals," which was more risque than the original TV version; "I Love to Be Unhappy"; "Goodbye Saccharine"; and "Honey (Touch Me with My Clothes On)". Don Novello appeared in the film as Father Guido Sarducci. The tagline to the film was: "Things like this only happen in the movies."

== Cast ==
- Gilda Radner as herself, various characters
- Don Novello as Father Guido Sarducci
- Paul Shaffer as Don Kirshner, Arnie Schnachtman, Student Body President, The Candy Slice Group
- Nils Nichols as Roadie
- Bob Christianson as Audition Scene Pianist
- Howard Shore as The Candy Slice Group
- Diana Grasselli as Rouge
- Myriam Valle as Rouge
- Maria Vidal as Rouge

== VHS and DVD information ==
Gilda Live has been released on VHS and was digitally remastered in 2000, and released on DVD through Warner Brothers' on-demand Warner Archive label on November 3, 2009.

== Critical reception ==
The New York Times wrote, "Nothing in 'Gilda Live' is funnier than, or a substantial departure from, the material Gilda Radner does on 'Saturday Night Live.' But the film ought to satisfy her fans."
