= Hit List (musical) =

2013 American musical

- Original poster for Hit List
- Music: Drew Gasparini; Joe Iconis; Andrew McMahon; Benj Pasek & Justin Paul; Marc Shaiman & Scott Wittman; Lucie Silvas
- Lyrics: Drew Gasparini; Joe Iconis; Andrew McMahon; Benj Pasek & Justin Paul; Marc Shaiman & Scott Wittman; Lucie Silvas
- Book: Julia Brownell (2013 Concert)
- Productions: 2013 Concert

Hit List is an American musical with music and lyrics by Marc Shaiman, Scott Wittman, Drew Gasparini, Joe Iconis, Andrew McMahon, Benj Pasek & Justin Paul, and Lucie Silvas and a book by Julia Brownell, based on the original fictitious musical from the second season of the NBC television series Smash.

Within the television series Hit List is created by characters Jimmy Collins (Jeremy Jordan) and Kyle Bishop (Andy Mientus). Hit List centers around three characters, Amanda, Jesse and "The Diva", as they seek to attain and hold onto fame. Amanda is portrayed by Karen Cartwright (Katharine McPhee), Jesse by Jimmy Collins and The Diva by Ana Vargas (Krysta Rodriguez).

On October 15, 2013, New York City venue 54 Below announced plans to stage Hit List in concert format. Jordan, Mientus and Rodriguez each appeared, with Carrie Manolakos standing in for McPhee. The musical's original concert production opened on December 8, 2013 and closed December 9, 2013 after 3 regular performances.

== Development ==
Hit List was created for season two of Smash, intended to be a rival production to Bombshell, the Marilyn Monroe biographical musical created for season one. Drew Gasparini, Joe Iconis, Andrew McMahon, Benj Pasek and Justin Paul, Marc Shaiman and Scott Wittman and Lucie Silvas created the material for the fictional musical. Smash season two showrunner Joshua Safran envisioned Hit List as a "scrappy underdog" to the senior Bombshell, taking inspiration from the 2005 documentary film ShowBusiness: The Road to Broadway, and from Broadway seasons which saw Wicked head-to-head with Avenue Q and Billy Elliot in competition with Next to Normal.

Safran wanted the sound of the second musical to completely contrast with that of Bombshell so he turned to rising theater writers. The first two songs selected for Hit List were "Broadway, Here I Come" and "The Goodbye Song", both by Joe Iconis. "So, in a very strange way, those songs actually created Hit List", Safran stated. He described Hit List as being about "really deal[ing] with the power of fame these days in the music industry or the arts. And the idea that in order to be somebody, you have to pretend to be somebody else."

=== Fictional genesis ===
Karen Cartwright overhears Jimmy Collins performing "Broadway Here I Come" and calls director Derek Wills (Jack Davenport) to listen. She offers to introduce Jimmy and his writing partner, Kyle Bishop, to Derek. Jimmy initially refuses but at Kyle's urging he relents. The pair pitches the musical, about a poor boy with songwriting talent who falls for a rich girl who steals his songs. Derek agrees to help shape the musical, to be called Hit List.

At Derek's suggestion, Jimmy and Kyle put together a workshop production of Hit List for the New York Fringe Festival. They do a read-through for friends, which is a disaster because of Kyle's weak book. They press on with the Fringe presentation but Karen's commitment to Bombshell prevents her from appearing. The first staging is poorly received but Karen clandestinely appears in the second staging, which is applauded. With the success Derek sees the potential and attaches himself to the show as director.

Following a successful audition, Manhattan Theatre Workshop director Scott Nichols (Jesse L. Martin) offers to stage Hit List on his venue's "underground" stage. Karen withdraws from the role of Marilyn Monroe in Bombshell and joins the cast of Hit List as Amanda/Nina. After an impromptu audition in a bar, Ana secures the role of The Diva. With the book still in trouble, Scott and Derek enlist Julia Houston (Debra Messing) to serve as dramaturg for Hit List.

Hit List opens on the main stage at the Manhattan Theatre Project to excellent reviews. Broadway producer Jerry Rand (Michael Cristofer) commits to transferring it to the Ethel Barrymore Theatre on Broadway. Jimmy's volatile attitude gets him fired from the production.

The night before Hit List is slated to open Off-Broadway, Kyle is struck by a car and killed. Grief-stricken, the company decides to open anyway, performing a concert version of the show as a tribute. Moments after the show begins, Jimmy arrives and re-assumes the role of Jesse, performing "The Love I Meant to Say". The company then launches into the fully staged show.

With Hit List running on Broadway, a member of the company named Daisy Parker (Mara Davi) blackmails Derek with threats of a sexual harassment lawsuit unless he gives her the role of The Diva. To avoid scandal, Derek capitulates, leading Ana to threaten legal action.

Hit List is nominated for 13 Tony Awards, facing off against rival show Bombshell (nominated in 12 categories). Hit List wins seven awards, including a posthumous Best Book Tony for Kyle, but loses Best Musical to Bombshell. Karen loses Best Actress to Ivy Lynn (Megan Hilty) in the role of Marilyn.

=== Comparisons to Rent ===
Critics noted the similarities between Hit List and Kyle Bishop and the musical Rent and its creator, Jonathan Larson. Like Hit List, Rent premiered in a workshop setting and transferred (although Rent went first to an Off-Broadway venue before going to Broadway). The morning before the show's Off-Broadway premiere, Larson died suddenly but the cast opened the show as scheduled. Like Kyle Bishop, Larson posthumously won the Tony Award for Best Book for a Musical (also Best Score). These parallels were intentional.

Two recurring cast members of Smash, Jesse L. Martin and Daphne Rubin-Vega, were also in the original cast of Rent. Joshua Safran, who was associated with Rent through his ex-boyfriend Anthony Rapp, consulted with both actors to be sure they felt that the story was appropriate and not exploitative. "If Daphne or Jesse had said, 'We feel like this story is in poor taste,' or, 'We don’t think you should do this story,' we’d [have pulled] the plug on it ... Also, because I know them from back in the day — I lived with them ... I think they also felt like I had a connection to that history, and what I was doing was writing my life, in a way."

Andy Mientus has performed in Rent and was also aware of the parallels between his character and Larson. He was nervous about playing the parallels because of his connection to the show but hoped that it mirrored Larson's "enthusiasm and his light and positivity in a way that [made] that parallel something that’s a tribute and not exploitative. It’s about this kid who loves this art form more than anything, and has worked so hard and struggled so much to get the show to where it is, and then can’t be there to see it through. Hopefully that’s the story that we’re telling."

=== Real-world staging ===
Safran initially expressed interest in staging a real-world version of Hit List during the second season. "We all talk about doing a Hit List concert at Joe's Pub, which everyone wants to do ... and if I did, I would use some of the songs we never used." Following a performance of the song "Broadway, Here I Come" on Smash, 54 Below artistic director Jennifer Ashley Tepper contacted Safran via the social networking site Twitter. Tepper had previously collaborated with Joe Iconis, who wrote "Broadway, Here I Come".

On October 15, 2013, it was announced that Hit List would be staged in concert format at 54 Below for two performances on December 9. Tickets for both shows sold out in under an hour. Because of the high demand, an additional performance was scheduled for December 8. The concerts, under the musical direction of Benjamin Rauhala, was presented by Safran and Tepper, with a book written by screenwriter Julia Brownell. Smash stars Jeremy Jordan, Andy Mientus and Krysta Rodriguez performed as "Jesse", "Nick" and "The Diva" respectively. Katharine McPhee, whose character Karen Cartwright starred in the fictional Hit List, was unavailable; her role of "Amanda" was performed by Carrie Manolakos, who had recorded several demo versions of songs performed on Smash. Completing the cast are Molly Hager, Eric Michael Krop, Julia Mattison, Monet Julia Sabel, and Eric William Morris.

Songs that Safran had intended to use on Smash but did not were incorporated into the show, including "Anymore", "The Guide to Success" and "Haddonfield, 15 Years Later" by Iconis, "Calling Out My Name" by Lucie Silvas, "If I Had You" by Gasparini and "Swim" by McMahon. Hit List features 19 songs in total. Both Jordan and Rodriguez noted that the Hit List material when it appeared in Smash was more geared to advancing the Smash stories and characters rather than those of Hit List. With the live staging some songs were performed by different characters from those who performed them for the series.

== Productions ==
=== Original 54 Below Concert Production ===
After creating a cult-like following from the television show, Hit List opened for a three show engagement at 54 Below on December 8, 2013 through December 9, 2013. The production was musically directed by Benjamin Rauhala, orchestrated by Charlie Rosen, and presented by Julia Brownell, Joshua Safran, and Jennifer Ashley Tepper. The original concert cast included Jeremy Jordan and Carrie Manolakos in the lead roles of Jesse and Amanda. The cast also featured Krysta Rodriguez as The Diva, Andy Mientus as Nick, and Eric William Morris as JB.

== Synopsis (2013 Concert Version) ==
Setting: New York City, New Jersey, and Los Angeles, Modern Day

=== Act I ===
The Diva attends Nina Hope's concert. She walks toward the stage, raises a gun and pulls the trigger ("Broadway, Here I Come (Pre-Reprise)").

As "poor little rich girl" Amanda Brown performs for a record producer, she hopes that this is finally her time to make it as a pop star ("Good For You"). Jesse returns home to his dirty Brooklyn apartment where he is greeted by his roommate Nick. After a brief discussion with his roommate, Jesse goes to bed, but not before a quick smoke ("Rewrite This Story"). Following a confrontation with her family, who threaten to cut her off financially if she pursues her pop star dreams, Amanda, depressed and lonely, heads to a deserted Brooklyn pier, where she contemplates suicide ("Broadway, Here I Come!"). Jesse, seeing that Amanda is about to kill herself, intervenes by singing to her ("Anymore"). Infatuated with Amanda, Jesse delightedly tells his roommate about his love for her ("If I Had You"). Growing closer together, Jesse and Amanda discuss Hollywood's biggest pop-star to date, The Diva ("Reach For Me"). Jesse, confused as to why Amanda would want to be a fake sell out like The Diva, sits while she explains what it takes to be original ("Original"). After making love, Amanda sneaks out of bed, steals all of Jesse's sheet music and disappears into the night. Days later, Nick sits in the apartment writing when Jesse enters, they discuss Amanda's disappearance. Jesse, the only one convinced Amanda didn't kill herself, doubts that she will return. Two months later, Jesse and Nick are closing up the bar in which they work at when Jesse takes interest in the radio. A familiar song echoes through the speakers as Jesse realizes it's Amanda singing one of his songs ("Anymore Reprise"). The radio DJ announces that the song is the newest single by up and rising pop-star Nina Hope. Jesse, convinced he has to find Nina, makes his way to Los Angeles ("I Heard Your Voice In A Dream"). Outside a small club, Jesse comes face to face with Amanda transformed into Nina Hope. Jesse goes to Nina's hotel room, where he is coaxed into writing more music to help Nina's career. As Nina's career ascends, Jesse falls back into drug abuse. Nina takes over the party of talent manager JB Planko and forces an audition onto him and he agrees to represent her ("Pretender"). Jesse looms over Nina, JB informs him that it doesn't matter if Nina lies about writing her own music regardless records will sell, after all it is a business ("Guide To Success"). Jesse sits in Nina's hotel room, hidden away from the world writing music ("Don't Let Me Know (Pre-Reprise)"). Nina checks in on his writing and begins practicing "her" newest hit to perform for JB ("Don't Let Me Know"). JB, loving Nina, wants to market her to the world, what better way then a duet performance on the international television broadcast of the VMAs between Nina and his currently biggest star The Diva ("I'm Not Sorry"). As Nina's career soars, The Diva has a public breakdown. Nina goes on a publicity tour, advertising her new CD "Hopeful". Jesse is appalled that Nina would throw The Diva under the bus on Conan and pleads for her to join him on a trip back to New York. Nina tells JB of her plans to return home for a brief trip when he kisses her and they make love. Jesse waits for Nina, who is not coming, depressed leaves without her ("Caught In The Storm").

=== Act II ===
Nick is on the phone trying to get a hold of Jesse. The Diva is hopelessly trying to find herself and blames Nina for her problems. Jesse is on his way home to New York ("Calling Out My Name"). Jesse and The Diva stand in front of two different doors, Jesse knocks first, Nick answers. Nick takes Jesse inside and gives him some advice ("Swim"). The Diva knocks on the door hoping to find her parents and resumes her original identity, "Sara Smith". No one believes she was once The Diva and she spirals deeper into despair ("Haddonfield (15 Years Later)"). Without Jesse to write for her, Nina attempts an original song at her concert ("Good For You (Reprise)"). Nina, headed in a downward spiral, breaks things off with JB. She returns to Jesse, now clean and sober, and expresses her desire to return to being the Amanda she used to be, with him at her side ("Heart-Shaped Wreckage").

Amanda, her work now polished by her experience as Nina, auditions again for the same record company executives who, along with the rest of the world, have no idea she used to be Nina (who has vanished without a trace). She performs her first concert as herself and it is a moderate success. As she launches into her final song, Sara Smith arrives and shoots her ("Broadway, Here I Come! (Reprise)"). Sara Smith jumps on stage trying to promote her new song. Jesse holds Amanda in his arms. He tries to help her but it is too late. Jesse sings his goodbyes to Amanda as she dies on stage ("The Love I Meant To Say"). The internet goes crazy over the news of The Diva's arrest. Her mediocre single rises to the top, becoming bigger than she ever was. At the pier, a depressed Jesse writes in his notebook ("Rewrite This Story (Reprise)"). The musical closes with Jesse once again bidding Amanda goodbye while The Diva is returned to her former glory despite the possibility that the next "Amanda" is out there ready to challenge her supremacy ("The Goodbye Song").

== Characters ==
Principal roles and casts of major productions of stage productions of Hit List

Character	Description	Fictitious Fringe Cast	Fictitious Workshop Cast	Fictitious Broadway Cast	Original Concert Cast
Jesse	The male lead of Hit List. A recovering addict, Jesse gets roped into writing music for Amanda's alter-ego Nina Hope and this leads him to start abusing drugs again.	Jimmy Collins (Jeremy Jordan)	Jimmy Collins (Jeremy Jordan)	Jimmy Collins (Jeremy Jordan)	Jeremy Jordan
Amanda Brown Nina Hope	The female lead of Hit List. A "poor little rich girl", who dreams of fame and ruthlessly fights to become the biggest pop-star since The Diva	Audra (Final performance, Karen Cartwright (Katharine McPhee))	Karen Cartwright (Katharine McPhee)	Karen Cartwright (Katharine McPhee)	Carrie Manolakos
The Diva Sara Smith	The villainess of Hit List. Currently the world's biggest pop-star. She quickly loses her mind when she loses her fame and seeks her revenge against all those she holds responsible for her downfall.	Ana Vargas (Krysta Rodriguez)	Ana Vargas (Krysta Rodriguez)	Ana Vargas (Krysta Rodriguez); Daisy Parker (Mara Davi)	Krysta Rodriguez
Nick	A dedicated writer. Jesse's devoted and helpful best friend.	N/A	N/A	N/A	Andy Mientus
JB Planko	The ruthless and sleazy top Hollywood talent manager to the biggest stars in the world. Among those he represents are The Diva, and Nina Hope.	N/A	N/A	Sam Strickland (Leslie Odom Jr.)	Eric William Morris

== Musical Numbers (2013 Concert Version) ==
Act I

- "Broadway, Here I Come! (Prologue)" — The Diva
- "Good For You" — Amanda
- "Rewrite This Story" — Amanda and Jesse
- "Broadway, Here I Come!" — Amanda
- "Anymore" — Jesse
- "If I Had You" - Jesse and Nick
- "Reach For Me" — The Diva
- "Original" — Amanda
- "Anymore (Reprise)" — Nina
- "I Heard Your Voice In a Dream" — Jesse
- "Pretender" — Nina
- "Guide To Success" - JB
- "Don't Let Me Know" — Nina and Jesse
- "I'm Not Sorry" — Nina and The Diva
- "Caught In a Storm" — Jesse

Act II

- "Calling Out My Name" - Jesse and The Diva
- "Swim" - Nick
- "Haddonfield (15 Years Later)" — Sara Smith
- "Good For You (Reprise)" — Nina
- "Heart-Shaped Wreckage" — Amanda and Jesse
- "Broadway, Here I Come! (Reprise)" — Amanda
- "The Love I Meant To Say" — Jesse
- "The Goodbye Song" — Jesse, Amanda, The Diva and Ensemble

== Critical reception ==
Times Square Chronicles described Hit List as "a show for anyone whose dreams are on the edge". Calling the show's sound "great" and its cast "energetic and vocal", the site declared that Hit List should come to Broadway or at least Off-Broadway but that the book should have explored a theme that its fictional writers proposed when pitching the show in Smash, that the songs be an actual "hit list" for people who had wronged the character Jesse.

Jeff Lunden for NPR concurred in part and dissented to an extent. Calling the concert "energetic", the cast "superb" and the music "genuinely impressive", he nonetheless expressed some doubt whether the show itself could be a hit. He would, however, buy a cast recording.

The New York Post declared Hit List to be "exhilarating" and the "hottest new musical in town". Citing the "workable book" as a "happy surprise", the Post praised the "energized" cast, singling out Jordan for special commendation, calling him "relaxed, charming and funny". Hit List, the Post concluded, may prove to be Smash's legacy.

== Future ==
No plans to continue Hit List have been announced. The property is under the control of NBC.
