= Disaster! (musical) =

Musical

- A 70s Disaster Movie Musical!
- Key art of the 2016 Broadway Production
- Music: Various
- Lyrics: Various
- Book: Jack Plotnick; Seth Rudetsky
- Setting: New York City, 1979
- Premiere: May 23, 2011: The Box, New York City
- Productions: 2011 Off-Off-Broadway; 2012 Off-Broadway; 2013 Off-Broadway; 2016 Broadway

Disaster! is a jukebox musical comedy created by Seth Rudetsky and written by Rudetsky and Jack Plotnick. Earthquakes, tidal waves, piranhas, infernos and the songs of the '70s take center stage in this comedic homage to 1970s disaster films.

The show debuted at The Box on March 23, 2011. A second production at Triad Theatre, with choreography by Denis Jones and music supervision by Steve Marzullo, opened on January 22, 2012, and ran through March 25. A third production ran from November 2013 through April 2014 at New York's St. Luke's Theatre. The show opened on Broadway at the Nederlander Theatre on March 8, 2016, with previews beginning on February 9, 2016. The show starred Rudetsky, along with Roger Bart, Kerry Butler, Kevin Chamberlin, Adam Pascal, Faith Prince, Rachel York, Max Crumm and Jennifer Simard. Baylee Littrell and Lacretta Nicole made their Broadway debuts. The show closed on May 8, 2016, after playing 32 previews and 72 regular performances.

The plot follows a group of New Yorkers that attend the opening of a floating casino and discothèque that quickly succumbs to multiple disasters. These calamities correlate with plots of various disaster films of the 1970s, such as earthquakes or killer bee incidents. Additionally, this play keeps with a 1970s theme by using popular songs of the decade as musical numbers.

== Development and productions ==
Origins go back to the early 1990s. While working together in 1992, Seth Rudetsky and Drew Geraci developed the concept of creating a musical reminiscent of the 70s disaster films they both appreciated. The original storyline involved the New York City blackout of 1977 and incorporated the decade's top songs as both musical numbers and vehicles for comedy.

When Rudetsky was asked in 2011 to put on a show benefiting the nonprofit organization Only Make Believe, he decided to return to his disaster musical idea, and in the span of three months, he and Jack Plotnick revised the concept and wrote the first script of Disaster!. Major changes included widening the plot's range: instead of focusing on one disaster, the NYC blackout, they decided to introduce a variety of catastrophes common to the popular films of the 1970s that they had grown up watching. The benefit show successfully impressed critics, and from its success, the musical later had a nine show Off-Broadway run at the Triad Theatre, followed by another Off-Broadway production that ran for eleven previews and eighty-six performances.

A Broadway production directed by Plotnick opened in March 2016 at the Nederlander Theatre, with an all-star cast and choreography by JoAnn M. Hunter. The show was produced by Robert Ahrens, Mickey Liddell/LD Entertainment, Hunter Arnold, James Wesley, Jim Burba and Bob Hayes. While Jennifer Simard received a Tony nomination as Best Featured Actress in a Musical for her role as Sister Mary Downey, ticket sales weren't strong enough to make the production financially viable, with the show often playing only to half-capacity audiences. The Broadway production closed on May 8, 2016, having run for 32 previews and 72 regular performances. A cast album was released on September 9, 2016.

== Plot ==
Disaster! takes place in 1979 Manhattan during opening night of the Barracuda, the first floating casino and discothèque in New York. The characters gather to gamble and dance, unaware of impending natural disasters, and the building's lack of safety measures compounds these catastrophes. Notably, the casino's structure was built on a fault line, which causes earthquakes throughout the show. The plot follows several characters' dynamics and interactions throughout the opening night as they deal with various plot elements reminiscent of 1970s disaster cult films such as The Poseidon Adventure and Airport 1975.

=== Act One ===
It's 1979 and the opening night for "The Barracuda", New York City's first floating casino. Chad Rubik is looking for female company ("Hot Stuff") and decides to join his best friend, Scott, as a waiter aboard the casino boat. Meanwhile, on the pier, Professor Ted Scheider is collecting water samples to determine whether the new pier has been drilled directly into a dangerous fault line. Marianne, a freelance reporter, has heard that Tony Delvecchio, the owner of the Barracuda, ran out of money and had to cut corners. He asks her to join him on board for some drinks and she agrees, hoping to get a scoop.

While the guests wait in line, a dour Sister Mary Downey appears, collecting money for the orphans fund and warning people that gambling is a sin ("The Lord's Prayer"). She meets Shirley and Maury Summers, who are celebrating Maury's retirement. Despite the Sister's protestations, Shirley buys her a ticket and she enters the casino. Faded disco star Levora Verona runs onto the pier with her precious dog, Baby. She successfully avoids a cab driver she can't afford to pay and gets on board, hoping she'll win back her fortune ("Theme from Mahogany (Do You Know Where You're Going To)").

Inside her casino dressing room, sexy lounge singer Jackie excitedly tells her children, 11-year-old twins Ben and Lisa, that Tony told her, "If tonight goes perfectly, he will ask me to marry him... possibly!" Tony enters just as a tremor shakes the room, causing Ben's Lite-Brite toy to fall to the ground. Ben cries as he notices that "The Lite-Brite pieces are lost in the shag carpeting!" Tony explains that the tremor was probably caused by nearby construction and tells Ben that he should never, ever cry. Jackie then goes onstage to wow the opening night crowd ("Saturday Night"). During her number, Scheider warns Tony that the vibrations from everyone dancing is going to trigger an earthquake and Tony angrily throws him off the ship.

Meanwhile, Sister Mary is practically salivating over a Hawaii Five-O-themed slot machine but when noticed by Shirley, adamantly denies having a gambling addiction. Marianne tries to interview Tony but he's only interested in one thing, ("Do You Wanna Make Love"). She accuses him of having a trap door installed at the bottom of the ship to dump illegal contraband and produces proof that he skipped safety precautions. Tony panics but is able to sneak away when Marianne freezes at the sight of Chad who has offered them drinks. Shaken, she apologizes to Chad for leaving him at the altar years ago. He tells her it's "fine", and then retreats to the bathroom to express his true feelings ("Without You"). Hurt by Chad's indifference, Marianne drinks an entire bottle of wine, then runs into Lisa and tries to convince her (and herself) that being an independent woman is the most important thing in the world ("I Am Woman/That's the Way I've Always Heard It Should Be").

Jackie is in her dressing room when Scheider runs in to hide. He explains that an earthquake is coming and enlists Ben and Lisa to run and tell the captain to ready the lifeboats. Tony suddenly enters and Scheider quickly throws on a bird mask. Jackie covers by telling Tony that Scheider is a performer she hired and drags him onstage ("Mockingbird").

Shirley and Maury run into a depressed Marianne, who is surprised to find out they're married because they "seem so happy". They admit that marriage is hard but tell her that they still love each other dearly ("Still the One"). While Scheider hides out with Jackie, he reveals that his first wife, Dr. Wo-Ching Lee, died in a volcanic explosion and he feels responsible. Since then, he's become a disaster expert and tells Jackie one of the main rules is not to try to save individual lives. When Jackie leaves to perform, we see three private moments: Chad sings about Marianne, Marianne sings about Chad, and Scheider sings about Wo ("Feelings").

In the casino, Sister Mary's out-of-tune guitar upsets Baby. Levora is extremely insulted because Sister doesn't know any of her hit songs (including "Makin' Sweet Sweet Love" and "Put It Where I Want It"). Levora leaves in a huff, unknowingly dropping a quarter. Sister Mary knows she should give it to the orphans but imagines gambling it and winning them more. Nonetheless, she tries to walk away from the slot machine but is unable to ("Never Can Say Goodbye").

Sister ultimately gambles away all the fund money. She bumps into Shirley on the elevator and they ride in uncomfortable silence, interrupted only by elevator music ("Feels So Good"). Suddenly, Shirley reveals that she has a fatal disease, and explains that she'll soon show the final warning signs, like uncontrollable winking and inappropriate verbal outbursts. She hasn't told Maury because she wants whatever time they have left to "only be happy". Shirley shyly suggests she might soon end it all because she doesn't want Maury to have to watch her suffer. The Sister tells her unequivocally that taking one's life is a sin and an eternity in Hell will await her if she does it. Ben and Lisa run into Chad and tell him that an earthquake is coming and he immediately runs off to warn Marianne.

In the casino, a wealthy woman approaches Levora and offers to buy Baby for an extraordinary sum. Levora can't bear to part with the only thing she's ever loved, yet she has only one quarter left to gamble and gain back her fortune. She knocks on the wood-paneled slot machine for luck and talks to Baby ("Knock on Wood"). Soon, various patrons are knocking along with her, on the machines, the floor... everything.

While this is happening, Marianne confronts Tony about the safety precautions and runs away as he tries to throw her off the boat. Chad sees Marianne hiding and tells her to get off the boat, but she misunderstands, thinking Tony has sent him. Scheider has heard the knocking and runs to the casino to warn everyone they're going to trigger an earthquake. They stop and start to tiptoe off the boat, but Levora has put in her quarter and wins ("Hawaii 5-0"). All the coins pouring out of the machine hit the floor and trigger an enormous earthquake.

=== Act Two ===
Act Two opens ("All Right Now") to reveal massive destruction in the casino as well as the Hawaii Five-O slot machine lever impaled in Scott's stomach. Chad arrives and tries to get Scott to safety ("You're My Best Friend")†, but Scott dies. Shirley, Maury, Jackie and Lisa are all in Jackie's dressing room but Jackie soon leaves to find Ben, who's missing. In a deserted hallway, Tony explains to his right-hand man that the earthquake actually solved his problems. It will be considered a force majeure and all of his debt will be paid. And he's positive he'll end the night being seen as a hero.

Chad is on the deck to give Scott a burial at sea and runs into the wealthy man, whose wife was killed by a falling ice sculpture ("Three Times a Lady"). While waiting in Jackie's dressing room, Shirley starts showing signs of her impending death (inappropriate verbal outbursts) and Lisa discovers Ben, who is passed out because of his diabetes. Lisa volunteers to carry Ben to the infirmary to get insulin and Maury and Shirley follow.

On the way they meet the sister, who is praying for death because she thinks that the earthquake was her punishment. She's certain that God wants her in hell but Shirley convinces her that God actually wants her to help other people and they all set off for the insulin. Lisa spies the infirmary and they run to it ("Ben"). Ben is revived in the nick of time. Everyone in the casino is panicking because the earthquake has caused the boat to detach from the pier, but Tony is calm and directs people to the lifeboats. However, Scheider warns that a tidal wave is coming and quickly ushers them into a hallway. Upon learning this, Marianne runs out onto the deck and gets Chad off his lifeboat ("Baby Hold On to Me") and back onto the ship. The tidal wave hits and the ship turns upside down. Scheider assures everyone that the safest thing to do is stay put, but Tony boasts that he'll save everyone through an exit ladder in the kitchen. Scheider objects, but Tony assures them the kitchen has fire doors and is therefore safe, so half the survivors, including Jackie, Ben and Lisa leave with him. The others choose to wait it out with Scheider ("25 or 6 to 4"). There is an explosion from the kitchen and only Tony reappears. Scheider realizes Tony lied about the fire doors, and they all express their anger at him, as Chad also shares his anger with Marianne for not showing up to their wedding ("Sky High").

Jackie and her children survived the blast but are hanging from a wall. She hopes Tony will come and rescue them, but the kids know better ("When Will I Be Loved"). Scheider decides to buck his own rules, braves the fire, and arrives to rescue them with a daring routine on a high beam ("Nadia's Theme"). On their way back to the casino, they hear Tony, who's trapped in a flooded room with sharks ("Don't Cry Out Loud"). The explosion has separated Levora from her dog, Baby. The sister appears and helps Levora find him by strumming her guitar until he barks ("Come to Me").

Marianne admits to Chad she did love him but was scared their marriage would make them as miserable as her parents. They find themselves in a room that's flooding and filled with man-eating piranhas. The only way to escape is through a water-tight door, but it's locked. Perched together atop a pile of chairs, Chad admits he regrets not calling her for years. ("I Really Want to See You Tonight"). Suddenly, they hear sounds above them and start banging Morse code on the ceiling, screaming for help ("Knock Three Times").

In the casino, Jackie and her kids reappear and Tony thanks Scheider for rescuing him. He tells little Ben that it's good to cry every day, to which Ben responds, "I already do." Tony tries to reconnect with Jackie but she decides to end their relationship ("I Will Survive"). Shirley hears Chad and Marianne's Morse code and Scheider informs her that he has instructions on how to unlock the door in his Disaster Handbook. Shirley tells him she was a tap dance champion and will tap out the instructions. The Sister quietly asks Shirley if it's wise to exert herself because it might lead to death but Shirley tells her she might as well "go out helping people", and the Sister blesses her decision. Shirley taps out the instructions ("A Fifth of Beethoven"), Chad and Marianne are saved and pledge their love for each other ("Reunited") and Shirley dies in Maury's arms.

A swarm of rats attack so everyone rushes to safety in Tony's private office where Tony apologizes for everything and finally admits there is a trapdoor on the bottom of the ship. Ben points out that the ship is upside down and, therefore, the trap door is on the ceiling. They all escape onto the top of the ship as the sun rises ("Daybreak"). A helicopter appears and drops harnesses. As survivors buckle themselves in, Scheider reveals his feelings for Jackie ("Hooked On a Feeling") and they all begin flying off to safety. Because the pier was destroyed, the helicopter is taking them to New Jersey. When Levora hears where they're heading, she exclaims, "New Jersey? This is the worst disaster yet!"

† "You're My Best Friend" does not appear in the internationally licensed version of the production.

== Characters ==
Main named characters.

- Ted Scheider: A professor and "disaster expert" who tries to warn the others of the impending doom.
- Tony Delvecchio: The deceitful owner of the casino.
- Chad Rubik: A flirtatious caterer at the casino who was previously engaged to Marianne.
- Scott: Friend of Chad's and also a caterer at the casino.
- Marianne Wilson: Reporter and ex-fiancée of Chad. She left him to pursue her career.
- Jackie Noelle: Lounge singer and mother. She is hoping that Tony will propose.
- Ben and Lisa Noelle: Jackie's twins. Played by one male actor.
- Levora Verona: A washed up singer hoping to hit it big in the casino.
- Sister Mary Downey: A nun with a gambling addiction.
- Maury: The devoted husband of Shirley.
- Shirley: The wife of Maury.
- Jake: The personal bodyguard of Tony.

== Cast ==
Character	Triad Theater 2012	St. Luke's Theatre previous cast 2013-2014	St. Luke's Theatre cast Spring 2014	Nederlander Theatre 2016
Marianne Wilson	Carrie Manolakos	Haven Burton	Maggie McDowell	Kerry Butler
Levora Verona	Lacretta Nicole	Charity Dawson	Charity Dawson	Lacretta Nicole
Tony Delvecchio	Clif Thorn	John Treacy Egan; Jack Plotnick	Paul Castree; David Hibbard	Roger Bart†
Chad Rubick	Zak Resnick	Matt Farcher	Matt Farcher	Adam Pascal
Maury	Tom Riis Farrell	Tom Riis Farrell	Tom Riis Farrell	Kevin Chamberlin
Jackie Noelle	Lauren Kennedy	Michele Ragusa; Mary Birdsong	Stacey Oristano; Sarah Litzsinger	Rachel York
Professor Ted Scheider	Seth Rudetsky	Seth Rudetsky	Seth Rudetsky	Seth Rudetsky
Scott	Paul Castree	Robb Sapp	Max Crumm	Max Crumm
Sister Mary Downey	Anika Larsen	Jennifer Simard	Jennifer Simard	Jennifer Simard
Ben/Lisa Noelle	Clark Kelley Oliver	Jonah Verdon	Jonah Verdon	Baylee Littrell
Shirley	Kathy Fitzgerald; Annie Golden	Mary Testa; Annie Golden	Judy Gold	Faith Prince
Wealthy Husband/Taxi Driver/ Security Guard/Chef	Saum Eskandani	Saum Eskandani	Saum Eskandani	Manoel Felciano; Paul Castree
Woman Who Screams	Sherz Aletaha	Sherz Aletaha	Sherz Aletaha	Olivia Philip
Wealthy Wife	Spring Groove	Maggie McDowell	Kristy Cavanaugh	Maggie McDowell

†Tony Delvecchio was played by Will Swenson for one week while Bart was on leave April 28 - May 6, 2016.

== Musical numbers ==
Act I

Song	Original artist	Songwriter(s)	Performer(s)
"Hot Stuff"	Donna Summer	Summer, Giorgio Moroder and Pete Bellotte	Chad, Scott, Scheider, Tony and Ensemble
"The Lord's Prayer"	Sister Janet Mead	Traditional; arranged by Arnold Strals	Sister Mary
"Theme from Mahogany (Do You Know Where You're Going To)"	Diana Ross	Michael Masser and Gerry Goffin	Levora
"Saturday Night"	Bay City Rollers	Bill Martin and Phil Coulter	Jackie and Ensemble
"Do You Wanna Make Love"	Peter McCann	McCann	Tony and Marianne
"Without You"	Badfinger	Pete Ham and Tom Evans	Chad
"I Am Woman / That's the Way I've Always Heard It Should Be"	Helen Reddy / Carly Simon	Reddy and Ray Burton / Simon and Jacob Brackman	Marianne and Lisa
"Mockingbird"	Inez & Charlie Foxx	Inez and Charlie Fox	Jackie and Scheider
"Still the One"	Orleans	John Hall and Johanna Hall	Shirley and Maury
"Never Can Say Goodbye / Torn Between Two Lovers"	The Jackson 5 / Mary MacGregor	Clifton Davis / Peter Yarrow and Phillip Jarrell	Sister Mary
"Feelings"	Morris Albert	Louis Gasté and Albert	Scheider, Marianne and Chad
"Feels So Good"	Chuck Mangione	Mangione	(Instrumental)
"Knock on Wood"	Eddie Floyd	Floyd and Steve Cropper	Levora and Ensemble
"Hawaii Five-O"	The Ventures	Morton Stevens	(Instrumental)

Act II

Song	Original artist	Songwriter(s)	Performer(s)
"All Right Now"	Free	Andy Fraser and Paul Rodgers	(Instrumental)
"You're My Best Friend"	Queen	John Deacon	Chad and Scott
"Three Times a Lady"	The Commodores	Lionel Richie	Chad and Wealthy Husband
"Ben"	Michael Jackson	Walter Scharf and Don Black	Ben, Lisa, Maury, Shirley and Sister Mary
"Baby Hold On"	Eddie Money	Money and Jimmy Lyon	Marianne
"25 or 6 to 4"	Chicago	Robert Lamm	Cast
"Sky High"	Jigsaw	Clive Scott and Des Dyer	Cast
"When Will I Be Loved"	Linda Ronstadt	Phil Everly	Ben, Lisa and Jackie
"Nadia's Theme"	Barry DeVorzon and Perry Botkin Jr.	DeVorzon and Botkin Jr.	(Instrumental)
"Don't Cry Out Loud"	Melissa Manchester	Peter Allen and Carole Bayer Sager	Tony
"Come to Me"	France Joli	Tony Green	Levora and Sister Mary
"I'd Really Love to See You Tonight"	England Dan and John Ford Coley	Parker McGee	Chad and Marianne
"Knock Three Times"	Tony Orlando and Dawn	Irwin Levine and L. Russell Brown	(Instrumental)
"I Will Survive"	Gloria Gaynor	Dino Fekaris and Freddie Perren	Jackie and Tony
"A Fifth of Beethoven"	Walter Murphy	Ludwig van Beethoven and Murphy	Shirley and Cast
"Reunited"	Peaches and Herb	Fekaris and Perren	Chad, Marianne and Scheider
"Daybreak"	Barry Manilow	Manilow and Adrienne Anderson	Cast
"Hooked on a Feeling / Daybreak"	Blue Swede / Manilow	Mark James / Manilow and Anderson	Cast

Cut songs

Song	Original artist	Songwriter(s)
"Signed, Sealed, Delivered I'm Yours"	Stevie Wonder	Wonder, Lula Mae Hardaway, Lee Garrett and Syreeta Wright
"He Ain't Heavy, He's My Brother"	The Hollies	Bobby Scott and Bob Russell
"Alone Again (Naturally)"	Gilbert O'Sullivan	O'Sullivan
"Muskrat Love"	Captain and Tennille	Willis Alan Ramsey
"I'm Still Standing"	Elton John	John and Bernie Taupin
"Call Me (Come Back Home)"	Al Green	Green, Al Jackson Jr. and Willie Mitchell

== Critical reception ==
The musical has received positive reviews from various respected news outlets. The New York Daily News named Disaster! one of its top ten must-see musicals for 2013, claiming that "This spoof of catastrophe-themed movies mixed with '70s pop hits gushes with Velveeta as well as laughs, great new talents and savvy jukebox craftsmanship." Time Out New York critic and president of New York Drama Critics' Circle Adam Feldman rated the show five stars, stating, "I can't remember the last time I laughed out loud at the theater as often as I did at Disaster!...with meticulous ingenuity, the show repurposes three dozen classic tunes from the Me Decade to often hilarious effect." The New York Times Charles Isherwood called the show "self-consciously ditzy," saying that it really "earns that exclamation point."

== Awards and nominations ==
=== 2013 Off-Broadway Production ===
Year	Award ceremony	Category	Nominee	Result
2014	Drama Desk Awards	Outstanding Featured Actress in a Musical	Jennifer Simard	Nominated
2014	Drama League Awards	Distinguished Performance	Jennifer Simard	Nominated

=== 2016 Broadway Production ===
Year	Award ceremony	Category	Nominee	Result
2016	Tony Awards	Best Featured Actress in a Musical	Jennifer Simard	Nominated
2016	Drama League Awards	Distinguished Performance	Jennifer Simard	Nominated
2016	Drama Desk Awards	Outstanding Featured Actor in a Musical	Baylee Littrell	Nominated
