= White People (album) =

Studio album by Handsome Boy Modeling School
- Released: November 9, 2004
- Genre: Hip-hop
- Length: 68:50
- Label: Elektra
- Producer: Dan the Automator, Prince Paul

Handsome Boy Modeling School chronology
So... How's Your Girl? (1999)	White People (2004)	Music To Drink Martinis To (2023)

Singles from White People
- 1. "The World's Gone Mad" Released: 2004

Professional ratings
Aggregate scores
Source	Rating
Metacritic	66/100
Review scores
Source	Rating
AllMusic	2.5/5 stars
Drowned in Sound	7/10
Entertainment Weekly	B
The Guardian	2/5 stars
MusicOMH	favorable
Pitchfork Media	6.6/10
Robert Christgau	B+
Slant Magazine	3.5/5 stars
Stylus Magazine	D−
Tom Hull – on the Web	B+

White People is the second studio album by Handsome Boy Modeling School. It was released on Elektra Records on November 9, 2004. The album features guest appearances from a diverse array of performers, including Linkin Park, Del tha Funky Homosapien, The Mars Volta, Alex Kapranos, De La Soul, Jack Johnson, Cat Power, Lord Finesse, Jamie Cullum, Pharrell Williams, John Oates, RZA, Julee Cruise, El-P, Mike Patton, and comedians Tim Meadows and Father Guido Sarducci.

== Reception ==
At Metacritic, which assigns a weighted average score out of 100 to reviews from mainstream critics, White People received an average score of 66% based on 28 reviews, indicating "generally favorable reviews".

John Murphy of MusicOMH called it "the most innovative, original and enjoyable hip-hop album since Outkast's Speakerboxxx/The Love Below."

== Track listing ==
No.	Title	Length
1.	"Intro" (featuring Father Guido Sarducci)	1:08
2.	"If It Wasn't for You" (featuring De La Soul and Starchild Excalibur)	4:37
3.	"Are You Down With It" (featuring Mike Patton)	3:34
4.	"The World's Gone Mad" (featuring Del the Funky Homosapien, Barrington Levy, and Alex Kapranos)	5:24
5.	"Dating Game" (featuring Tim Meadows, Hines Buchanan, and Neelam)	3:08
6.	"Breakdown" (featuring Jack Johnson)	4:09
7.	"It's Like That / I Am Complete" (featuring Casual and Tim Meadows)	4:50
8.	"I've Been Thinking" (featuring Cat Power)	5:24
9.	"Rock and Roll (Could Never Hip Hop Like This) Part 2 / Knockers" (featuring Lord Finesse, Linkin Park, Rahzel, Qbert, Grand Wizard Theodore, Jazzy Jay, and Tim Meadows)	7:16
10.	"The Hours" (featuring Chino Moreno, El-P and Cage)	4:28
11.	"Class System" (featuring Pharrell and Julee Cruise)	4:30
12.	"First... and Then" (featuring Dres)	4:19
13.	"A Day in the Life / Good Hygiene" (featuring RZA, The Mars Volta, A.G., and Tim Meadows)	5:36
14.	"Greatest Mistake" (featuring John Oates and Jamie Cullum)	4:19
15.	"Dating Game Part 2" (featuring Tim Meadows, Hines Buchanan, and Neelam)	0:36
16.	"Outro" (featuring Father Guido Sarducci)	5:26

== Charts ==
Chart	Peak position
Billboard 200	168
Top R&B/Hip-Hop Albums	79
Top Heatseekers	4
