= Celebrity Autobiography: In Their Own Words =

2005 American comedy television special

Poster for the off-Broadway production

Celebrity Autobiography: In Their Own Words was a one-hour comedy television special that premiered on December 5, 2005, on Bravo. The show featured comedians reading actual excerpts from celebrity autobiographies. The special was based on a live show written by Eugene Pack, which opened in Los Angeles, California in 1998.

Excerpts were chosen because of their melodramatic and/or vacuous nature. Autobiographies which were connected, such as memoirs by former Hollywood couple Burt Reynolds and Loni Anderson, were read together.

Celebrities whose autobiographies were read included Burt Reynolds, Loni Anderson, members of 'N Sync, Madonna, Sylvester Stallone, Mr. T, Elizabeth Taylor, Kathie Lee Gifford, Ivana Trump, Zsa Zsa Gabor, Vanna White, Kenny Loggins, Tommy Lee and David Cassidy. Comedians included Bruce Vilanch, Jay Mohr, Cheryl Hines, Kevin Nealon, Doris Roberts, Fred Willard, Niecy Nash, Kel Mitchell, Laraine Newman and Andrea Martin.

An off-Broadway production with a rotating cast featuring Matthew Broderick, Kristen Johnston, Rachel Dratch, Kristen Wiig, Sherri Shepherd, Richard Kind, Claudia Shear, Scott Adsit, Fred Armisen, Will Forte, Jason Sudeikis, Kenan Thompson, Casey Wilson, Bobby Moynihan, Bob Balaban, Joy Behar, Richard Belzer, Craig Bierko, Bobby Cannavale, and Alan Cumming, among others, won the Drama Desk Award for Unique Theatrical Experience.
