= Eugene Pack =

American dramatist

Eugene Pack is a writer, producer, actor, and playwright. He created the long-running satirical comedy show Celebrity Autobiography, in which he also performs. The show had a run on Broadway at the Marquis Theatre. For producing Celebrity Autobiography, Pack won the 2009 Drama Desk Award and the Bistro Award for Comedy. A graduate of New York University, Pack studied with David Mamet, the Practical Aesthetics Workshop, and Playwrights Horizons.

== Celebrity Autobiography ==
"Celebrity Autobiography" was created by Pack and developed with Dayle Reyfel in Los Angeles, was eventually filmed as a television special on Bravo in 2005, which he also executive produced and appeared in. Since then, the show has enjoyed a successful off-Broadway run, winning the Drama Desk Award. The show now plays in cities throughout the United States and recently headlined at the Edinburgh Fringe Festival to sold out audiences and rave reviews. The comedy show features readings from celebrity autobiographies with a rotating cast of participating celebrities.

== Television and Plays ==
As a writer and producer, Pack has worked extensively in television. He was nominated for an Emmy in Outstanding Writing for Variety, Comedy, or Music for the special America: A Tribute to Heroes, which won the Emmy for Outstanding Special. He also created and is the Executive Producer for the popular CMT series Dallas Cowboys Cheerleaders: Making the Team, now in its record breaking 17th season, TV Land's Back to the Grind, and Style's What I Hate About Me. As a playwright, Pack wrote and acted in the critically acclaimed one-man shows The Senior and Something Flexible With Meaning.

== Acting Work ==
As an actor, Pack has appeared on such shows as Doogie Howser, MD, Relativity, and The War at Home.
