= Handsome Boy Modeling School =

American hip-hop duo

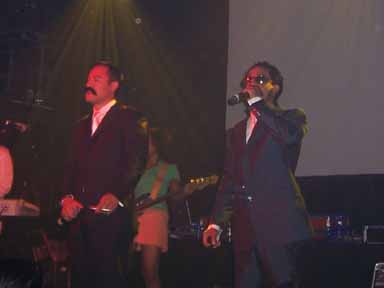
- Handsome Boy Modeling School performing in New York City in 2005.

Background information
- Genres: Hip-hop, trip hop, electronica
- Years active: 1999–2006, 2018–present
- Labels: Tommy Boy, Elektra
- Members: Dan the Automator; Prince Paul

Handsome Boy Modeling School is an American collaborative project between hip-hop producers Dan the Automator (Gorillaz, Dr. Octagon, Deltron 3030) and Prince Paul (Stetsasonic, De La Soul, Gravediggaz). The collaboration originally lasted from 1999 to 2006 and resulted in two albums, featuring a vast cast of guest rappers, singers, comedians and DJs. In February 2018, the duo played a concert in New York City.

== History ==
Handsome Boy Modeling School is a conceptual hip-hop duo that parodied and acted as a commentary on vain, consumerist, materialistic, and self-absorbed members of upper class society, such as supermodels and people from old money. The pair often satirize upper class snobbery and perceived beauty.

In 1999, they released the concept album So... How's Your Girl?, loosely based on "The Prettiest Week of My Life", an episode of the sitcom Get a Life starring Chris Elliott. The episode contains the origin of the name Handsome Boy Modeling School, where Chris Elliott's character enrolls to become a male model. In the album, Dan and Paul assume the characters of Nathaniel Merriweather and Chest Rockwell, respectively. The Rockwell name is in reference to a pseudonym used by a porn star in 1997 film Boogie Nights; the Merriweather name is likely an homage to the character Nathaniel Mayweather, also played by Chris Elliott, in the 1994 comedic feature Cabin Boy. Dan the Automator continued to use the pseudonym Nathaniel Merriweather alongside Mike Patton and Jennifer Charles for the collaborative project Lovage.

A number of guest musicians appear, including Róisín Murphy (one half of the duo Moloko at the time of the album's release), DJ Shadow, Del the Funky Homosapien, J-Live, Sean Lennon, Miho Hatori (of Cibo Matto), Mike D (of the Beastie Boys) and Don Novello (as comic character Father Guido Sarducci).

Their 1999 single "The Projects" in collaboration with Dave of De La Soul and Del the Funky Homosapien was featured in the 2001 film Ocean's Eleven.

Their second album, White People, was released in November 2004. Some collaborators from the first album returned, and new collaborators included RZA, Cat Power, Casual, Alex Kapranos of Franz Ferdinand, Chester Bennington and Mike Shinoda of Linkin Park, Jack Johnson, Cedric Bixler-Zavala of The Mars Volta, Mike Patton, El-P, Pharrell, John Oates, Chino Moreno, Lord Finesse, Black Sheep, and comedy actor Tim Meadows.

In 2006, Prince Paul announced his retirement from Handsome Boy Modeling School due to business conflicts with Dan the Automator. However, the duo reunited to play a concert hosted by Saks Fifth Avenue, New York City, on 14 February 2018. According to HipHopDX, they announced plans to release a new album at the performance. On 9 April 2022, at a show in Portland, Oregon, Dan the Automator officially announced that a third album was in the works, predicting a fall 2022 release.

In March 2023, the group released Music To Drink Martinis To in partnership with Ford’s Gin.

== Discography ==
=== Studio albums ===
List of studio albums, with selected chart positions
Title	Album details	Peak chart; positions	
Title	Album details	US	AUS
So... How's Your Girl?	Released: October 19, 1999; Label: Tommy Boy; Format: CD, LP, cassette	198	—
White People	Released: November 9, 2004; Label: Elektra; Format: CD, 2×LP	168	63

== Extended plays ==
List of extended plays
Title	EP details
Music to Drink Martinis To	Released: March 6, 2023; Label: London Dry

=== Singles ===
List of singles, with selected chart positions
Title	Year	Peak chart positions	Album
Title	Year	UK	Album
"Magnetizing"	1999	—	So... How's Your Girl?
"Rock 'n' Roll (Could Never Hip Hop Like This)"	1999	76	So... How's Your Girl?
"The Projects (PJays)" (featuring Dave and Del the Funky Homosapien)	1999	—	So... How's Your Girl?
"The Truth" (featuring Roisin* & J-Live)	1999	—	So... How's Your Girl?
"Sunshine"	2000	—	So... How's Your Girl?
"The World's Gone Mad" (featuring Alex Kapranos, Del the Funky Homosapien and Barrington Levy)	2004	82	White People
"Case Study" (featuring Emi Meyer)	2023	—	Music to Drink Martinis To
"How Does It Feel?" (featuring Justin Warfield)	2023	—	Music to Drink Martinis To
