= Triad Theatre =

Performance venue in Manhattan, New York

Triad Theater
- Palsson's Supper Club, Steve McGraw's, Triad Theatre, Stage 72
- Interactive map of Triad Theater
- Address: 158 West 72nd Street; Manhattan, New York; United States
- Coordinates: 40°46′41.28″N 73°58′51.36″W
- Owner: Peter Martin and Rick Newman
- Capacity: 130
- Public transit: New York City Subway: 72nd Street/Broadway, 72nd Street/Central Park West

Construction
- Rebuilt: 2012

Website
- www.triadnyc.com

The Triad Theater, formerly known as Palsson's Supper Club, Steve McGraw's, and Stage 72, is a cabaret-style performing arts venue located on West 72nd Street on the Upper West Side of Manhattan in New York City. The theatre has been the original home to some of the longest running Off-Broadway shows including Forever Plaid, Forbidden Broadway, Spamilton, and Secrets Every Smart Traveler Should Know.

The Triad Theater is currently owned and operated by Peter Martin and partner Rick Newman, founder of New York's famed comedy and music venue, Catch a Rising Star.

== History ==
The Theater was built in 1984 and was the original home of four of the most successful shows in off-Broadway History, including Forbidden Broadway, Forever Plaid, and Spamilton, as well as Celebrity Autobiography; the hit comedy show is now in its ninth year at the venue. A month-long workshop production of Seth Rudetsky's show Disaster! went on to a Broadway production at the Nederlander Theater.

Some of the notable performers who have performed on the Triad stage include Martin Short, Kristen Wiig, Kevin Hart, Ryan Reynolds, Matthew Broderick, Bob Weir of Grateful Dead, Vanessa Williams, Jake LaMotta, Brooke Shields, Paul Rudd, David Steinberg, Slash, George Benson, Gregg Allman, Gavin DeGraw, Bebe Neuwirth, Jim Dale, Peter Boyle, Tracy Morgan, Tommy Tune, Ben Vereen, Air Supply, Dion, and many others from the worlds of comedy, music and theater. Lady Gaga made her professional debut on our stage as part of the Circle in the Square Cabaret Program. In the 1980s, Christopher Walken, Elizabeth Taylor, Liza Minnelli, Jack Nicholson, Robert De Niro and many other well known performers would use the Triad for their own weekly private performances.

The Triad Theater has also been used as a location for photo and film shoots; these include an episode of the Hulu comedy Difficult People, episodes of the interview series Speakeasy for Front and Center, and the cover photo shoot of Adrien Brody for Manhattan Magazine and Miami Magazine.

== Productions ==
Productions at Stage 72 have included:

- Forever Plaid (Original Production)
- Forbidden Broadway (Original Production)
- Celebrity Autobiography: In Their Own Words (Original Production)
- Secrets Every Smart Traveler Should Know
- A Couple of Blaguards (Frank McCourt) (Based on the Pulitzer Prize-winning Angela's Ashes)
- American Rhapsody: A New Musical Revue (Gershwin)
- Berlin to Broadway
- Loose Lips (with Bebe Neuwirth and Peter Boyle)
- Love is French by French singer Floanne
- Hello Muddah Hello Faddah (featured Alan Dershowitz)
- Nunsense (For the Holiday)
- Forbidden Hollywood
- Who Killed Woody Allen?
- Boobs! The Musical
- Last Jew in Europe
- Love, Linda: The Life Of Mrs. Cole Porter
- Katie Goodman's I Didn't F*ck It Up
- You've Got Hate Mail
- Disaster! (Pre-Broadway Tryout)
- Spamilton
- From My Hometown
- Kaballah with Emily Stern
- Jim Dale (Pre-Broadway Tryout)
- Bill Bogg's Talk Show Confidential
- Broadway Cares/Equity Fights AIDS Cabaret Series also got its start Triad.
- Mercury Show with Andrea McCardle (Original Annie)
- My Son The Waiter, A Jewish Tragedy
- Dion (Pre-Broadway Tryout)
- The Party Songs of Ruth Wallace
- Mark Felt Superstar
- Bush is Bad
- Kurt Weil Berlin to Broadway
- Jacque Brel Returns
- Doug Bernstein Showing Off
- Music of Maurey Festoon
- Ruthless the Musical
- Trump Family Special
- Me The People
- Tommy Tune (Pr-Broadway Tryout)
- Broadway's Next Hit Musical

== Music ==
- Gregg Allman
- Air Supply
- Marc Cohn
- Vanessa Carlton
- Cher
- Gavin DeGraw
- Sean Lennon
- Lenny Kravitz
- Ace Frehley
- Lady Gaga (Performance Debut)
- Tony Garnier (Bob Dylan's bassist)
- Debbie Gibson
- Debby Harry
- Christopher Cross
- Joey Fatone
- Art Garfunkel
- Ratdog
- Melissa Manchester
- Joey Fatone
- Jackie Paris
- Jeff Pevar
- Slash
- Melissa Manchester
- Tiffany Darwish
- John Waite
- Bob Weir of (Grateful Dead)
- Zendaya
- Dion
- Livingston Taylor
- Constantine Maroulis
- GE Smith
- Woody Guthrie Family Benefit
- Cornell Dupree
- Jonny Rosch – Blues Brothers, Cyndi Lauper
- Jeff Golub (Rod Stewart's lead guitarist)
- Frank Canino – Bass Benny King
- Richard Crooke (drummer)
- Mark Epstein (bassist)
- Roy Bennet Jr. (Singer of the band Stuff)
- Oz Noy
- Tony Garnier (Bob Dylan's band)
- Jon Herrington of Steely Dan
- Charles Giordano
- Tiffany Darwish

== Performers at The Triad ==
- Peter Boyle
- Matthew Broderick
- David Carradine
- Candy Clark
- Tony Darrow
- Victor Garber
- Gina Gershon
- Karen Lynn Gorney
- Steve Guttenberg
- William Hurt
- Richard Kind
- John Leguziamo
- Justin Long
- Andrew McCarthy
- Liza Minnelli
- Scarlette Fiore
- Ralph Macchio
- Marsha Mason
- Annette O'Toole
- Rosie Perez
- Parker Posey
- Ryan Reynolds
- Tony Roberts
- Paul Rudd
- Martin Short
- Kristen Wiig
- Elizabeth Taylor
- Christopher Walken
- Treat Williams
- Bruce Willis
- John Goodman
- Judy Gold
- Sandra Bernhard
- Joy Behar
- Brooke Shields
- Susie Essman
- Jackie Hoffman
- Robert Cuccioli
- Carol Kane
- David Harbour
- Debbie Harry
- Anthony Ramos
- Doug Bernstein
- Alice Ripley
- Cast of Jersey Boys
- Cast of Rent
- Cast of School of Rock
- Cast of Good Vibrations
- Grand Hotel – CD Cast
- Will Shorz

== See also ==
- List of supper clubs
