= Seth Rudetsky =

American actor and radio host

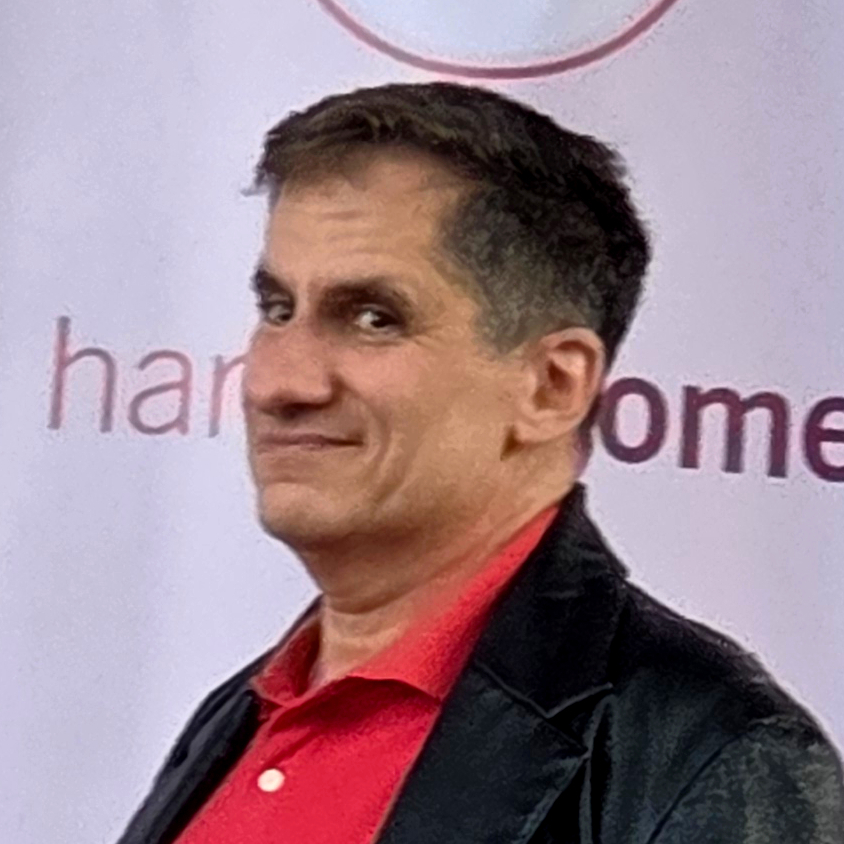
- Rudetsky at the Broadway Voices Unite Benefit Concert in 2026
- Born: February 28, 1967 (age 59); New York City, U.S.
- Education: Oberlin College (BM)
- Occupations: Musician, actor, writer, radio host
- Years active: 1998–present
- Spouse: James Wesley (m. 2012)
- Children: 1
- Website: sethrudetsky.com

Seth Rudetsky (born February 28, 1967) is an American musician, actor, writer, and radio host. He is the host of Seth's Big Fat Broadway and Seth Speaks on Sirius/XM satellite radio's On Broadway. The show is about Broadway theater history and trivia. In March 2020, Rudetsky and his husband created a daily live-streamed web series, Stars in the House, to benefit The Actors Fund in the wake of the coronavirus pandemic.

Rudetsky hosted Seth Rudetsky's Big Fat Broadway Live! with various Broadway stars like Mandy Gonzalez, Sierra Boggess, Adam Pascal, J. Harrison Ghee, and Krysta Rodriguez at the Bell Theater in Holmdel, New Jersey once a month from August to December for his "Broadway Concert Series".

== Early life and education ==
Rudetsky was born in New York City, on February 28, 1967 and grew up in North Woodmere, New York on Long Island. He graduated from Hewlett High School in Hewlett, New York, and Oberlin College Conservatory of Music in Oberlin, Ohio in 1988, with a degree in Piano Performance.

== Career ==
=== Acting ===
Rudetsky wrote and performed in a one-man show called Rhapsody in Seth in 2003. He often tours with variations on his one-man show. He appeared in the series finale of Kathy Griffin: My Life on the D-List. From November 27 through December 10, 2006, he starred in an Off-Off-Broadway production of Torch Song Trilogy. He appeared in the Roundabout Theatre Company revival of The Ritz from September 2007 through December 2007. Also in 2007, he appeared as a contestant on Episode No. 111 of the US version of Cash Cab. He was a vocal coach for the contestants on Legally Blonde: The Musical – The Search for Elle Woods, on MTV. He appeared in January 2008 in a regional production in Northport, New York of Lend Me a Tenor. He appeared in “Spare Some Change: NYC Artists for Barack Obama”, directed by Ryan Mekenian in 2008, alongside Shaina Taub, Carrie Manolakos, Joe Iconis, Lindsay Mendez, and Celia Keenan-Bolger.

On August 30, 2010, Rudetsky appeared with two-time Tony-winner Sutton Foster in a one-night-only concert performance of They're Playing Our Song at the Gerald W. Lynch Theater at the John Jay College of Criminal Justice in Manhattan on June 18, 2012. On Thursday evenings, he hosts Seth's Broadway Chatterbox, a one-hour talk show, at Don't Tell Mama on 46th Street in Manhattan.

Rudetsky began a website called SETH TV. The site had video archives and a $5/month subscription fee for exclusive content. He posted video "deconstructions" on the website in which he deconstructs (analyzes) the singing voices of Broadway performers. On November 4, 2013, Disaster!, a musical comedy starring Rudetsky and written by Rudetsky and Jack Plotnick, opened Off-Broadway at the St. Luke's Theatre. The show parodied 1970s disaster movies and received positive reviews, with The New York Times commending its "inspired lunacy". After a three-year run off-Broadway, Disaster! opened at the Nederlander Theatre on Broadway in 2016.

=== Writing ===
Rudetsky was nominated for the Emmy Award three times for his work as a comedy writer for The Rosie O'Donnell Show. He was a writer for the Grammy Award shows in 1999 and 2000. Rudetsky also wrote the opening number for seven Broadway Cares/Equity Fights AIDS Easter Bonnet Competitions and wrote for Gypsy of the Year shows of theirs.

Rudetsky had a short story "My First Story" included in the 2005 anthology Fresh Men 2: New Voice in Gay Fiction. In 2006, his book The Q Guide to Broadway was published by Alyson Books. and his novel Broadway Nights, was published by Alyson Books in 2007. In 2012, his first young adult novel, My Awesome/Awful Popularity Plan, was published by Random House. In 2015, he released a sequel, The Rise and Fall of a Theater Geek, also published by Random House.

=== Musicianship ===
Rudetsky is an accomplished musician. He has a degree in piano performance from Oberlin College and has accompanied Patti LuPone in concert, where he demonstrated a talent for on-sight transposition. In addition, Rudetsky conducted the orchestra at the November 30, 2007, special performance "Light the Lights--Broadway is Back" end-of-the-strike celebration. He composed the opening numbers for the 1998 and 2000 Tony Awards.

== Personal life ==
Rudetsky is gay. He married producer James Wesley in 2012, and they have a daughter, Juli. His brother Michael Rudetsky died at Boy George's mansion in North London, England in 1986. The cause was reportedly a heroin overdose, although no drug paraphernalia was found at the scene. Michael was 27 years old and a well-respected musician in pop music circles. He was a keyboardist, guitarist and writer who had worked with Cyndi Lauper, Kool & the Gang, and Joan Jett.

On March 18, 2024, Seth Rudetsky signed an open letter criticizing Jonathan Glazer's acceptance speech at the 96th Academy Awards. During his speech, Glazer denounced Israel calling for an end to the Gaza war.
