= So... How's Your Girl? =

Studio album by Handsome Boy Modeling School
- Released: October 19, 1999
- Genres: Hip-hop, trip hop
- Length: 60:30
- Labels: Tommy Boy, Warner Bros. Records
- Producers: Dan the Automator, Prince Paul

Handsome Boy Modeling School chronology
So... How's Your Girl? (1999)	White People (2004)

So... How's Your Girl? is the debut studio album by Handsome Boy Modeling School. It was released on Tommy Boy Records on October 19, 1999. The band's name is taken from an episode of the sitcom Get A Life, where the star Chris Elliott attempts to become a model. Many tracks on the album sample this episode.

== Reception ==
Professional ratings
Aggregate scores
Source	Rating
Metacritic	79/100
Review scores
Source	Rating
AllMusic	4.5/5 stars
Christgau's Consumer Guide	A
Entertainment Weekly	A−
Los Angeles Times	3/4 stars
NME	7/10
Pitchfork	5.0/10
Q	4/5 stars
Rolling Stone	3.5/5 stars
The Rolling Stone Album Guide	4/5 stars
Spin	9/10

At Metacritic, which assigns a weighted average score out of 100 to reviews from mainstream critics, So... How's Your Girl? received an average score of 79 out of 100 based on 13 reviews, indicating "generally favorable reviews".

It ranked at number 5 on Spin's "Top 20 Albums of the Year" list.

== Track listing ==
All songs produced by Dan the Automator and Prince Paul, except for "Waterworld" produced by Dan the Automator and "Holy Calamity (Bear Witness II)" produced by Dan the Automator, Prince Paul, and DJ Shadow.

No.	Title	Length
1.	"Rock n' Roll (Could Never Hip Hop Like This)"	4:21
2.	"Magnetizing" (featuring Del tha Funkee Homosapien)	6:11
3.	"Metaphysical" (featuring Miho Hatori and Mike D)	3:24
4.	"Look at This Face (Oh My God They're Gorgeous)"	1:59
5.	"Waterworld" (featuring Encore)	5:22
6.	"Once Again (Here to Kick One for You)" (featuring Grand Puba and Sadat X)	4:01
7.	"The Truth" (featuring Róisín Murphy and J-Live)	5:35
8.	"Holy Calamity (Bear Witness II)" (featuring DJ Shadow and DJ Quest)	4:01
9.	"Calling the Biz"	0:50
10.	"The Projects (P Jays)" (featuring Trugoy and Del tha Funkee Homosapien)	4:28
11.	"Sunshine" (featuring Sean Lennon, Money Mark, Father Guido Sarducci, Josh Haden, and Paula Frazer)	4:09
12.	"Modeling Sucks"	1:02
13.	"Torch Song Trilogy" (featuring Sensational)	3:55
14.	"The Runway Song" (featuring Kid Koala)	4:48
15.	"Megaton B-Boy 2000" (featuring Alec Empire and El-P)	4:57
16.	"Father Speaks" (featuring Father Guido Sarducci)	1:27

== Charts ==
Chart performance for So... How's Your Girl?
Chart (2022)	Peak position
Scottish Albums (Official Charts)	87
UK Dance Albums (Official Charts)	35
UK Independent Albums (Official Charts)	29
US Billboard 200	198
