= It's Garry Shandling's Show =

American television sitcom (1986–1990)

- Title screen from the first episode
- Genre: Sitcom; Meta-humor
- Created by: Garry Shandling; Alan Zweibel
- Starring: Garry Shandling; Geoffrey Blake (first six episodes); Molly Cheek; Jessica Harper; Scott Nemes; Michael Tucci; Co-Starring: Bernadette Birkett; Ian Buchanan; Barbara Cason; Paul Willson
- Theme music composer: Joey Carbone
- Country of origin: United States
- Original language: English
- No. of seasons: 4
- No. of episodes: 72 (list of episodes)

Production
- Executive producers: Bernie Brillstein; Brad Grey; Garry Shandling
- Producers: Jeff Franklin; Jim Geoghan; Al Jean; Mike Reiss
- Running time: 20–28 minutes
- Production companies: Our Production Company; Showtime Networks

Original release
- Network: Showtime
- Release: September 10, 1986 – May 25, 1990

It's Garry Shandling's Show is an American television sitcom that originally aired on Showtime from September 10, 1986, to May 25, 1990. The series, created by Garry Shandling and Alan Zweibel, is notable for breaking the fourth wall.

In the series, Garry Shandling plays a stand-up comedian who is aware that he is a television character. The series features Shandling interacting with the studio audience and manipulating storylines for better outcomes. The series was critically acclaimed and ran for 4 seasons and 72 episodes. Initially aired on Showtime, it was later picked up by Fox for reruns. The show received multiple awards and nominations, including five CableACE Awards and four Primetime Emmy Award nominations.

== Synopsis ==
The series stars Garry Shandling as himself: A neurotic, sardonic stand-up comedian who is aware he is a television sitcom character. Garry spends just as much time interacting with the studio audience as he does the regular cast members, performing monologues and show-closing summations of the episode's events (much like George Burns on The George Burns and Gracie Allen Show). However, on Garry's show, all the supporting characters know they are on a TV show, not just Garry; and the studio audience (itself a character) is often in the storyline.

At the time of the series' production, Shandling actually lived in Sherman Oaks, California, like the character on the series. His condominium on the series was styled to be like his real-life condo, down to the room layout and the furnishings.

Storylines were often manipulated by Shandling to create more favorable outcomes or simply to speed the story along. One episode ended several years after it began. Another allowed Shandling to tell the audience that time had passed in order to console an angry neighbor whose wall he had damaged; by the time the scene transitioned, the workmen had already fixed the wall. On America's presidential election night in 1988, Showtime presented a live episode wherein Shandling brought in Soul Train host Don Cornelius to incorrectly announce that Michael Dukakis had soundly defeated George H. W. Bush.

The series' theme song is "This Is the Theme to Garry's Show". The lyrics were conceived and co-written by Zweibel, "while we were in an elevator at Bernie Brillstein's office," as Zwiebel recalled, after Shandling suggested they "do a theme song about a theme song." The song's lyrics are self-referential, explaining how the song came to be ("Garry called me up and asked if I would write his theme song") and asking what the listener thinks of the song. Joey Carbone composed the music (as well as original incidental music for the series), and Bill Lynch sang the theme.

Considered a critical and niche success, It's Garry Shandling's Show ran 72 episodes and was on the air for four seasons (1986–1990). The show was later picked up by the broadcast Fox network from 1988 to 1990 as part of its Sunday night lineup with minor cuts for language and advertising breaks; Fox began airing the show from the beginning, but due to longer seasons for network shows versus cable, had caught up by the time the show left Fox in March 1990. New episodes continued for a few months thereafter on Showtime. The series put Shandling on the A-list and prompted the success for his run as Larry Sanders on HBO's The Larry Sanders Show.

== Cast and characters ==
Throughout the series, the cast was divided into the "Starring" cast, whose names were featured in the opening credits; the "Co-Starring" cast and the "Guest Starring" cast, both of which had the actors' names featured in the end credits.

=== Starring ===
- Garry Shandling as Garry Shandling - Immature star/host of the show. Constantly obsessed with his hair.
- Geoffrey Blake as Lewis (early season 1) - Garry's ladies' man best friend. Dropped from the series after the first run of six episodes.
- Molly Cheek as Nancy Bancroft - Garry's "attractive, but non-threatening, platonic neighbor."
- Jessica Harper as Phoebe Bass (season 4) - Garry's girlfriend and eventual wife.
- Scott Nemes as Grant Schumaker - Garry's neighbor, son of Pete and Jackie Schumaker.
- Michael Tucci as Pete Schumaker - Garry's best friend and neighbor. Father of Grant and husband of Jackie. Very nerdy and clumsy. Leads his son's Cub Scout troop.

=== Co-starring ===
- Bernadette Birkett as Jackie Schumaker (mid-season 1 through season 4, recurring guest early season 1) - Garry's neighbor, Pete's wife and Grant's mother.
- Ian Buchanan as Ian McFyfer (mid-season 3 through season 4, recurring guest early season 3) - Nancy's boyfriend and eventual husband.
- Barbara Cason as Ruth Shandling (seasons 2–4, recurring guest season 1) - Garry's mother.
- Paul Willson as Leonard Smith (mid-season 1 through season 4, recurring guest early season 1) - The president of the condo association that Garry lives in, who frequently drops by uninvited so that he can end up on-camera on Garry's show. He is a nuisance to Garry and his friends.

=== Recurring guest stars ===
- Bruno Kirby as Brad Brillnick (seasons 3–4) - Garry's agent.
- Richard Fancy as Mr. Stravely (seasons 3–4) - Network boss.
- Roy Brocksmith as Mr. Guest (seasons 3–4)
- Chi Ngo as Kim Moon (seasons 3–4)
- Danny Dayton as Mr. Peck (seasons 2–3) - Comedy club owner.
- Rob Reiner (seasons 1–3), Tom Petty (seasons 2–3), and Martin Mull (seasons 3–4) as themselves

While fighting ovarian cancer, Gilda Radner guest-starred as herself in the series in 1988 in what would be her final television appearance. When Shandling asked her why she had not been seen on television for a while, Radner replied, "Oh, I had cancer. What did you have?"

== Episodes ==
Season	Episodes	Originally released	
Season	Episodes	First released	Last released
1	16	September 10, 1986	April 10, 1987
2	17	October 25, 1987	March 18, 1988
3	20	October 21, 1988	April 21, 1989
4	19	November 10, 1989	May 25, 1990

== Release ==
=== Broadcast ===
In the United States, the series aired on Showtime. The first season aired on Wednesdays and the rest of the series aired on Sundays. It was originally picked up for 6 episodes. After the success of them, Showtime ordered 12 more (although only 10 were produced).

To bolster its Sunday night lineup, Fox secured the rights to air reruns of It's Garry Shandling's Show less than a month after they aired on Showtime. The reruns aired Sundays on Fox at 9:00–9:30 from March 1988 to July 1989, at 9:30–10:00 in July 1989, at 10:00–10:30 from July to August 1989, and at 10:30–11:00 from August 1989 to March 1990.

The series was aired in the United Kingdom on BBC Two from 1987 to 1990.

=== Home media ===
On October 20, 2009, Shout! Factory released It's Garry Shandling's Show: The Complete Series on DVD in Region 1. The 16-disc set features extensive bonus features including featurettes, commentaries and outtakes. Time praised the set's release, writing "As self-referential comedies went, you never meta better one," while Entertainment Weekly named it one of the best TV on DVD releases of 2009. The first season of the series was released as a standalone title in America in April 2010.

In Region 2, Fabulous Films has released the first two seasons on DVD in the UK.

In Region 4, Shock Entertainment has released all 4 seasons on DVD in Australia.

== Awards and nominations ==
The series was nominated for four Primetime Emmy Awards. It won five CableACE Awards (three for Best Comedy Series and two for Garry Shandling). It won an American Comedy Award for Funniest Male Performance in a Comedy Series-Cable or Syndicated, and an award for Outstanding Achievement in Comedy in 1988 from the Television Critics Association.
