= List of awards and nominations received by Transparent =

List of awards received by Transparent
Awards & nominations
Award	Won	Nominated
Emmy Awards	8	21
Golden Globe Awards	2	5
Critics' Choice Television Award	3	12
Writers Guild of America Award	0	4
- Total number of wins and nominations
Totals	42	108
- References

This is a list of awards won and nominations for Transparent, an American television series that debuted on Amazon Studios on February 6, 2014. The series stars Jeffrey Tambor.

== Total nominations and awards for the cast ==
Actor	Nominations	Awards
Jeffrey Tambor	22	13
Judith Light	10	1
Gaby Hoffmann	3	0
Jay Duplass	3	0

== Significant Guild and Peer Awards ==
=== Primetime Emmy Awards ===
Year	Category	Nominee(s)	Episode(s)	Result	Ref
2015	Outstanding Comedy Series	Joey Soloway, Andrea Sperling, Bridget Bedard, Victor Hsu, Rick Rosenthal, Nisha Ganatra		Nominated	
2015	Outstanding Lead Actor in a Comedy Series	Jeffrey Tambor	"The Letting Go"	Won	
2015	Outstanding Supporting Actress in a Comedy Series	Gaby Hoffmann	"Rollin"	Nominated	
2015	Outstanding Guest Actor in a Comedy Series	Bradley Whitford	"Best New Girl"	Won	
2015	Outstanding Directing in a Comedy Series	Joey Soloway	"Best New Girl"	Won	
2015	Outstanding Writing in a Comedy Series	Joey Soloway	"Pilot"	Nominated	
2015	Outstanding Casting for a Comedy Series	Eyde Belasco		Nominated	
2015	Outstanding Costumes for a Contemporary Series, Limited Series or Movie	Marie Schley & Nancy Jarzynko	"Symbolic Exemplar"	Won	
2015	Outstanding Main Title Theme Music	Dustin O'Halloran		Won	
2015	Outstanding Production Design for a Narrative Program (Half-Hour Or Less)	Cat Smith, Maria Baker & Nya Patrinos	"The Letting Go"	Nominated	
2015	Outstanding Single-Camera Picture Editing for a Comedy Series	Catherine Haight	"Pilot"	Nominated	
2016	Outstanding Comedy Series	Joey Soloway, Andrea Sperling, Victor Hsu, Bridget Bedard, Noah Harpster, Micah Fitzerman-Blue, Rick Rosenthal		Nominated	
2016	Outstanding Lead Actor in a Comedy Series	Jeffrey Tambor	"Man on the Land"	Won	
2016	Outstanding Supporting Actress in a Comedy Series	Gaby Hoffmann	"Bulnerable"	Nominated	
2016	Outstanding Supporting Actress in a Comedy Series	Judith Light	"Flicky-Flicky Thump-Thump"	Nominated	
2016	Outstanding Guest Actor in a Comedy Series	Bradley Whitford	"Oscillate"	Nominated	
2016	Outstanding Guest Actress in a Comedy Series	Melora Hardin	"Flicky-Flicky Thump-Thump"	Nominated	
2016	Outstanding Directing in a Comedy Series	Joey Soloway	"Man on the Land"	Won	
2016	Outstanding Casting for a Comedy Series	Eyde Belasco		Nominated	
2016	Outstanding Costumes for a Contemporary Series, Limited Series or Movie	Marie Schley, Mark A. Summer	"Kina Hora"	Nominated	
2016	Outstanding Production Design for a Narrative Program (Half-Hour Or Less)	Cat Smith, Macie Vener & Susan Mina Eschelbach	"Kina Hora"; "The Book of Life"; "Man on the Land"	Won	
2017	Outstanding Lead Actor in a Comedy Series	Jeffrey Tambor	"Elizah"	Nominated	
2017	Outstanding Supporting Actress in a Comedy Series	Kathryn Hahn	"Life Sucks and Then You Die"	Nominated	
2017	Outstanding Supporting Actress in a Comedy Series	Judith Light	"Exciting and New"	Nominated	
2017	Outstanding Casting for a Comedy Series	Eyde Belasco		Nominated	
2017	Outstanding Cinematography for a Single-Camera Series (Half-Hour)	Jim Frohna	"If I Were a Bell"	Nominated	
2017	Outstanding Costumes for a Contemporary Series, Limited Series or Movie	Marie Schley, Hannah Schneider and Leslie Herman	"To Sardines and Back"	Nominated	
2017	Outstanding Production Design for a Narrative Program (Half-Hour Or Less)	Cat Smith, Macie Vener and Dea Johnson	"If I Were a Bell"	Nominated	

=== Golden Globe Awards ===
Year	Category	Nominee(s)	Result	Ref
2015	Best Television Series – Comedy or Musical	Transparent	Won	
2015	Best Actor – Television Series Musical or Comedy	Jeffrey Tambor	Won	
2016	Best Television Series – Comedy or Musical	Transparent	Nominated	
2016	Best Actor – Television Series Musical or Comedy	Jeffrey Tambor	Nominated	
2016	Best Supporting Actress – Series, Miniseries or Television Film	Judith Light	Nominated	
2017	Best Television Series – Comedy or Musical	Transparent	Nominated	
2017	Best Actor – Television Series Musical or Comedy	Jeffrey Tambor	Nominated	

=== ADG Excellence in Production Design Awards ===
Year	Category	Nominee(s)	Result	Ref
2016	Half Hour Single-Camera Television Series	Catherine Smith (for "Kina Hora")	Nominated	
2017	Half Hour Single-Camera Television Series	Catherine Smith (for "If I Were a Bell")	Nominated	

=== AFI Awards ===
Year	Category	Nominee(s)	Result	Ref
2014	AFI TV Award	Transparent	Won	

=== American Cinema Editors ===
Year	Category	Nominee(s)	Result	Ref
2015	Best Edited Half-Hour Series for Television	Catherine Haight (for "Pilot")	Nominated	

=== Artios Awards ===
Year	Category	Nominee(s)	Result	Ref
2016	Outstanding Achievement in Casting – Television Pilot – Comedy	Eyde Belasco	Won	
2016	Outstanding Achievement in Casting – Television Series – Comedy	Eyde Belasco	Won	
2017	Outstanding Achievement in Casting – Television Series – Comedy	Eyde Belasco	Won	

=== British Academy Television Awards ===
Year	Category	Nominee(s)	Result	Ref
2016	Best International Program	Transparent	Won	
2017	Best International Program	Joey Soloway, Andrea Sperling, Victor Hsu, Bridget Bedard	Nominated	

=== California on Location Awards ===
Year	Category	Nominee(s)	Result	Ref
2015	Location Team of the Year – Half Hour Television	Brooks Bonstin, Jaime Abarca Jr., Jesse Lorber, Andrew Cone, Gavin Feek, Paul Hargrave, Chris Fuentes	Nominated	

=== Cinema Audio Society Awards ===
Year	Category	Nominee(s)	Result	Ref
2017	Outstanding Achievement in Sound Mixing for Television Series – Half Hour	Sam Hamer, Andy D’addario, Gary Gegan	Nominated	

=== Costume Designers Guild Awards ===
Year	Category	Nominee(s)	Result	Ref
2016	Outstanding Contemporary Television Series	Marie Schley	Nominated	
2017	Outstanding Contemporary Television Series	Marie Schley	Nominated	

=== Directors Guild of America Awards ===
Year	Category	Nominee(s)	Result	Ref
2015	Outstanding Directing – Comedy Series	Joey Soloway (for "Best New Girl")	Won	
2016	Outstanding Directing – Comedy Series	Joey Soloway (for "Kina Hora")	Nominated	

=== Make-Up Artists and Hair Stylists Guild ===
Year	Category	Nominee(s)	Result	Ref
2017	Television and New Media Series – Best Contemporary Makeup	Emma Johnston Burton, Melanie Romero, Toniya Verna	Nominated	
2017	Television and New Media Series – Best Contemporary Hair Styling	Terrell L. Baliel, Roxane Griffin, Angela Gurule	Nominated	

=== Screen Actors Guild Awards ===
Year	Category	Nominee(s)	Result	Ref
2016	Outstanding Performance by a Male Actor in a Comedy Series	Jeffrey Tambor	Won	
2016	Outstanding Performance by an Ensemble in a Comedy Series	Alexandra Billings, Carrie Brownstein, Jay Duplass, Kathryn Hahn, Gaby Hoffmann, Cherry Jones, Amy Landecker, Judith Light, Hari Nef, Emily Robinson, Jeffrey Tambor	Nominated	
2017	Outstanding Performance by a Male Actor in a Comedy Series	Jeffrey Tambor	Nominated	

=== Producers Guild of America Awards ===
Year	Category	Nominee(s)	Result	Ref
2016	Outstanding Producer for Episode Television – Comedy	Joey Soloway, Andrea Sperling, Victor Hsu, Nisha Ganatra, Rick Rosenthal, Bridget Bedard	Won	

=== Writers Guild of America Awards ===
Year	Category	Nominee(s)	Result	Ref
2015	Television: New Series	Bridget Bedard, Micah Fitzerman-Blue, Noah Harpster, Ethan Kuperberg, Ali Liebegott, Faith Soloway, Joey Soloway	Nominated	
2015	Television: Comedy Series	Bridget Bedard, Micah Fitzerman-Blue, Noah Harpster, Ethan Kuperberg, Ali Liebegott, Faith Soloway, Joey Soloway	Nominated	
2015	Television: Episodic Comedy	Ethan Kuperberg (for "The Wilderness")	Nominated	
2016	Television: Comedy Series	Arabella Anderson, Bridget Bedard, Micah Fitzerman-Blue, Noah Harpster, Ethan Kuperberg, Ali Liebegott, Our Lady J, Faith Soloway, Joey Soloway	Nominated	

== Significant Critical Awards ==
=== Critics' Choice Awards ===
Year	Category	Nominee(s)	Result	Ref
2015	Critics' Choice Television Award for Best Comedy Series		Nominated	
2015	Critics' Choice Television Award for Best Actor in a Comedy Series	Jeffrey Tambor	Won	
2015	Critics' Choice Television Award for Best Supporting Actress in a Comedy Series	Judith Light	Nominated	
2015	Critics' Choice Television Award for Best Guest Performer in a Comedy Series	Bradley Whitford	Won	
2016	Critics' Choice Television Award for Best Comedy Series		Nominated	
2016	Critics' Choice Television Award for Best Actor in a Comedy Series	Jeffrey Tambor	Won	
2016	Critics' Choice Television Award for Best Supporting Actress in a Comedy Series	Judith Light	Nominated	
2016	Critics' Choice Television Award for Best Supporting Actor in a Comedy Series	Jay Duplass	Nominated	
2016	Critics' Choice Television Award for Best Guest Performer in a Comedy Series	Anjelica Huston	Nominated	
2016	Critics' Choice Television Award for Best Guest Performer in a Comedy Series	Cherry Jones	Nominated	
2016	Best Actor in a Comedy Series	Jeffrey Tambor	Nominated	
2016	Best Supporting Actress in a Comedy Series	Judith Light	Nominated	

*Note: There were two ceremonies held in 2016

=== Dorian Awards ===
Year	Category	Nominee(s)	Result	Ref
2015	TV Comedy of the Year	Transparent	Won	
2015	LGBT Show of the Year	Transparent	Won	
2015	Unsung TV Show of the Year	Transparent	Nominated	
2015	TV Performance of the Year — Actor	Jeffrey Tambor	Won	
2015	TV Director of the Year	Joey Soloway	Won	
2016	TV Comedy of the Year	Transparent	Won	
2016	LGBTQ TV Show of the Year	Transparent	Won	
2016	TV Performance of the Year – Actor	Jeffrey Tambor	Won	
2017	TV Comedy of the Year	Transparent	Won	
2017	LGBTQ TV Show of the Year	Transparent	Won	
2017	TV Performance of the Year – Actor	Jeffrey Tambor	Won	

=== Peabody Awards ===
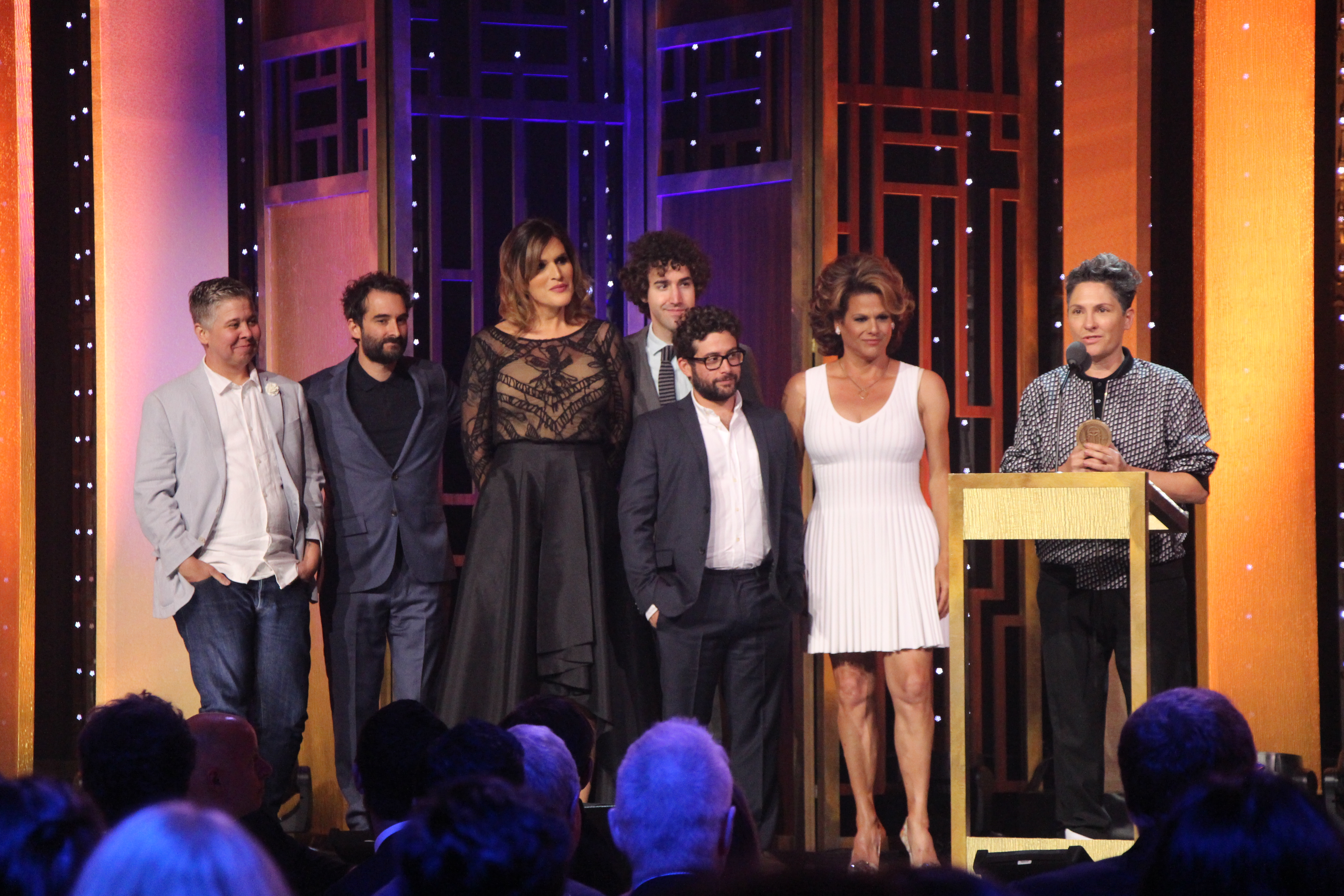
Ali Liebegott, Jay Duplass, Our Lady J, Ethan Kuperberg, Joe Lewis, Alexandra Billings and Joey Soloway accepting the Peabody Award for Transparent

Year	Category	Nominee(s)	Result	Ref
2016	Entertainment and Children's Program	Transparent	Won	

=== Satellite Awards ===
Year	Category	Nominee(s)	Result	Ref
2014	Best Television Series – Musical or Comedy	Transparent	Won	
2014	Best Actor in a Television Series – Musical or Comedy	Jeffrey Tambor	Won	
2015	Best Actor in a Television Series – Musical or Comedy	Jeffrey Tambor	Won	
2016	Best Actor in a Television Series – Musical or Comedy	Jeffrey Tambor	Nominated	

=== TCA Awards ===
Year	Category	Nominee(s)	Result	Ref
2015	Program of the Year	Transparent	Nominated	
2015	Outstanding Achievement in Comedy	Transparent	Nominated	
2015	Outstanding New Program	Transparent	Nominated	
2015	Individual Achievement in Comedy	Jeffrey Tambor	Nominated	

== Other Awards ==
=== GLAAD Media Awards ===
Year	Category	Nominee(s)	Result	Ref
2015	Outstanding Comedy Series	Transparent	Won	
2016	Outstanding Comedy Series	Transparent	Won	
2017	Outstanding Comedy Series	Transparent	Won	
2018	Outstanding Comedy Series	Transparent	Nominated	
2020	Outstanding TV Movie	Transparent: Musical Finale	Won	

=== Gotham Awards ===
Year	Category	Nominee(s)	Result	Ref
2015	Breakthrough Series – Long Form	Joey Soloway	Nominated	
2016	Made in New York Award	Judith Light	Won	

=== Hollywood Music in Media Awards ===
Year	Category	Nominee(s)	Result	Ref
2015	Main Title: TV Show/Digital Streaming Series	Dustin O'Halloran	Nominated	
2017	Original Score: TV Show/Limited Series	Dustin O'Halloran	Nominated	

=== NAACP Image Awards ===
Year	Category	Nominee(s)	Result	Ref
2016	Outstanding Writing in a Comedy Series	Joey Soloway (for "Kina Hora")	Nominated	
2017	Outstanding Writing in a Comedy Series	Our Lady J (for "If I Were A Bell")	Nominated	
2017	Outstanding Directing in a Comedy Series	Marta Cunningham (for "Exciting and New")	Nominated	

=== People's Choice Awards ===
Year	Category	Nominee(s)	Result	Ref
2016	Favorite Streaming Series	Transparent	Nominated	

=== Women's Image Network Awards ===
Year	Category	Nominee(s)	Result	Ref
2015	Outstanding Show Produced by a Woman	Andrea Sperling	Nominated	
2015	Outstanding Show Produced by a Woman	Joey Soloway	Nominated	
2015	Outstanding Comedy Series	Transparent	Nominated	
