= List of awards and nominations received by Cherry Jones =

Cherry Jones awards and nominations
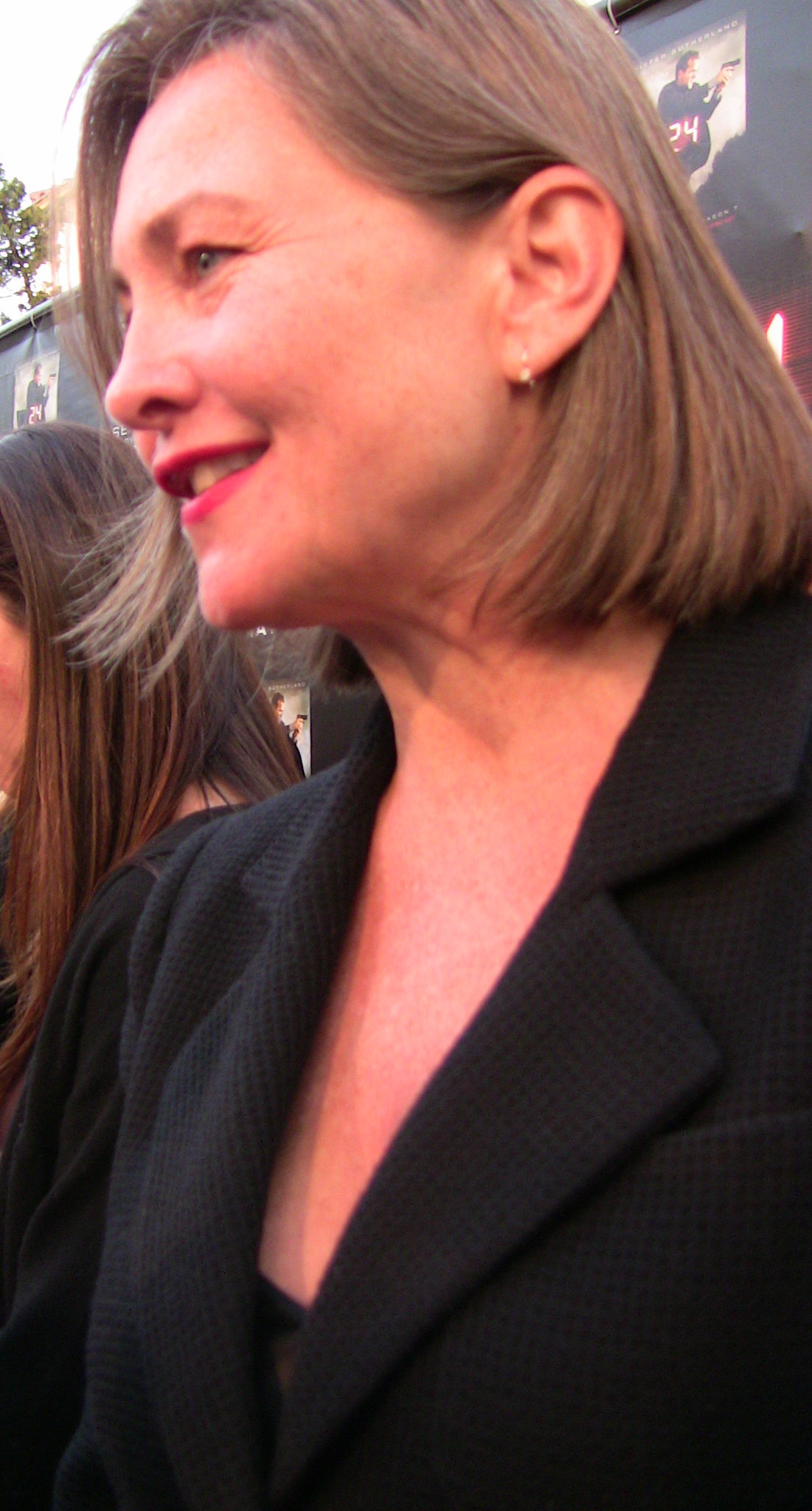
- Jones in 2009
Awards and nominations
Award	Wins	Nominations
Critics' Choice Awards	0	1
Emmy Awards	3	6
SAG Awards	0	1
Olivier Awards	0	1
Tony Awards	2	5

Totals (Note: Certain award groups do not simply award one winner. They acknowledge several different recipients, have runners-up, and have third place. Since this is a specific recognition and is different from losing an award, runner-up mentions are considered wins in this award tally. For simplification and to avoid errors, each award in this list has been presumed to have had a prior nomination.)
- Wins: 14
- Nominations: 25

Cherry Jones is an American actress of the stage and screen. She has received various accolades including a Critics' Choice Movie Award, three Primetime Emmy Awards and two Tony Awards as well as nominations for a Screen Actors Guild Award and a Laurence Olivier Award.

Jones is known for her dynamic and intense roles on Broadway and earned two Tony Awards, three Drama Desk Awards, two Drama Critics Circle Awards, two Obie Awards and two Outer Critics Circle Awards. She won two Tony Awards for Best Actress in a Play for playing Catherine Sloper, a lonely woman looking for love in the revival of the Ruth and Augustus Goetz play The Heiress (1995) and for originating the role of Sister Aloysius, a suspecting nun in the John Patrick Shanley play Doubt (2005). She was Tony–nominated for the Timberlake Wertenbaker play Our Country's Good (1991), the Eugene O'Neill revival A Moon for the Misbegotten (2000), and the Tennessee Williams revival The Glass Menagerie (2013). For the later, she reprised her role on the West End earning a Laurence Olivier Award for Best Actress nomination.

On television, she won the Primetime Emmy Award for Outstanding Supporting Actress in a Drama Series for playing Allison Taylor in the Fox action series 24 (2009–2010). She won two Primetime Emmy Awards for Outstanding Guest Actress in a Drama Series for her portrayals of Holly Maddox, the mother of the central character and outspoken feminist in the Hulu dystopian drama series The Handmaid's Tale (2017–2025) and Nan Pierce, the head of a news conglomerate in the HBO drama series Succession (2019–2023). She played Leslie Mackinaw, an academic in the Amazon Prime Video dramedy series Transparent (2015–2019), earning nominations for the Critics' Choice Television Award for Best Guest Performer in a Comedy Series and the Screen Actors Guild Award for Outstanding Performance by an Ensemble in a Comedy Series.

== Major associations ==
=== Critics' Choice Awards ===
Year	Category	Nominated work	Result	Ref.
Critics' Choice Television Awards
2016	Best Guest Performer in a Comedy Series	Transparent	Nominated	

=== Emmy Awards ===
Year	Category	Nominated work	Result	Ref.
Primetime Emmy Awards
2009	Outstanding Supporting Actress in a Drama Series	24 (episode: "Day 7: 7:00 a.m. – 8:00 a.m.")	Won	
2018	Outstanding Guest Actress in a Drama Series	The Handmaid's Tale (episode: "Baggage")	Nominated	
2019	Outstanding Guest Actress in a Drama Series	The Handmaid's Tale (episode: "Holly")	Won	
2020	Outstanding Guest Actress in a Drama Series	Succession (episode: "Tern Haven")	Won	
2023	Outstanding Guest Actress in a Drama Series	Succession (episode: "The Munsters")	Nominated	
2025	Outstanding Guest Actress in a Drama Series	The Handmaid's Tale (episode: "Exile")	Nominated	
2026	Outstanding Guest Actress in a Comedy Series	Hacks (episode: "Montecito")	Nominated	

=== Screen Actors Guild Awards ===
Year	Category	Nominated work	Result	Ref.
2015	Outstanding Ensemble in a Comedy Series	Transparent	Nominated	

=== Laurence Olivier Awards ===
Year	Category	Nominated work	Result	Ref.
2017	Best Actress	The Glass Menagerie	Nominated	

=== Tony Awards ===
Year	Category	Nominated work	Result	Ref.
1991	Best Actress in a Play	Our Country's Good	Nominated	
1995	Best Actress in a Play	The Heiress	Won	
2000	Best Actress in a Play	A Moon for the Misbegotten	Nominated	
2005	Best Actress in a Play	Doubt	Won	
2014	Best Actress in a Play	The Glass Menagerie	Nominated	

== Theatre awards ==
Organizations	Year	Category	Work	Result	Ref.
Drama Desk Awards	1995	Outstanding Actress in a Play	The Heiress	Won	
Drama Desk Awards	1998	Outstanding Actress in a Play	Pride's Crossing	Won	
Drama Desk Awards	2005	Outstanding Actress in a Play	Doubt	Won	
Drama Desk Awards	2006	Outstanding Actress in a Play	Faith Healer	Nominated	
Los Angeles Drama Critics' Circle	1996	Lead Performance	The Heiress	Won	
Los Angeles Drama Critics' Circle	2006	Lead Performance	Doubt	Won	
Obie Award	1992	Outstanding Performance	The Baltimore Waltz	Won	
Obie Award	2005	Outstanding Performance	Doubt	Won	
Outer Critics Circle Awards	2014	Outstanding Actress in a Play	The Glass Menagerie	Won'	

== Miscellaneous awards ==
Organizations	Year	Category	Work	Result	Ref.
GLAAD Media Awards	2004	Vito Russo Award	Herself	Won	
Satellite Awards	2009	Best Supporting Actress – Series, Miniseries or Television Film	24	Nominated	
