= Murder in a Small Town =

- Magazine advertisement
- Genre: Period mystery; Crime thriller
- Written by: Gilbert D. Pearlman; Gene Wilder
- Directed by: Joyce Chopra
- Starring: Gene Wilder; Mike Starr; Cherry Jones; Frances Conroy; Deirdre O'Connell; Terry O'Quinn
- Music by: John Morris
- Country of origin: United States
- Original language: English

Production
- Executive producer: Antony Root
- Producers: Fred Berner; Craig McNeil; Steven Paul
- Production location: Toronto
- Cinematography: Bruce Surtees
- Editor: Peter C. Frank
- Running time: 100 minutes
- Production companies: Crystal Sky Worldwide; Fred Berner Films; Granada Entertainment

Original release
- Network: A&E
- Release: January 10, 1999

Related
- The Lady in Question

Murder in a Small Town is 1999 American television mystery crime thriller film produced and broadcast by A&E. The period film stars Gene Wilder as Larry "Cash" Carter, a stage director, theater manager, former actor, and unofficial consulting detective for the police department in 1930s Stamford, Connecticut. Wilder also co-wrote the film, which was the first A&E Original Movie. High ratings led A&E to plan a Cash Carter franchise. However, only one sequel, The Lady in Question (1999), was produced.

== Plot ==
The film opens with a series of arguments involving local millionaire Sidney Lassiter. First, Sidney threatens to remove his son Albert from his will if Albert doesn't leave his current lover. His wife Martha then reveals that she knows that Sidney is unfaithful, and unsuccessfully tries to seduce him. Sidney then argues with his secretary, Kate Faxton, who wants him to reconcile with Albert.

After the argument with Ms. Faxton, Mr. Lassiter meets with Larry 'Cash' Carter, who is there to ask for a donation to the theater; Mr. Lassiter responds with unreasonable demands in exchange for his donation, as well as a few subtly bigoted comments about the fact that Carter is a Jew. Carter, despite his own best interest, calls Mr. Lassiter an anti-Semite and storms out of the office.

That night, Mr. Lassiter is surprised in his car by a stranger who had hidden in the back seat; the stranger fatally shoots Mr. Lassiter.

The next day, the detective in charge of the case, Lieutenant Tony "Baloney" Rossini, informs Cash that Mr. Lassiter has been murdered, and that there is a long list of suspects, due to Mr. Lassiter's temper and penchant for making enemies. Cash agrees to accompany Tony when they go to meet Albert, Martha, and Kate, who are all beneficiaries of Mr. Lassiter's will, and thus at the top of the suspect list.

While interviewing Mrs. Lassiter, Cash explains that his experience in theater has made him an expert on both observation and human psychology, both of which are helpful in police investigation; he demonstrates this by noting that, due to the muscle tone in her legs, the scuff marks on the soles of her shoes, and the lack of calluses on her hands, Mrs. Lassiter is faking the need for a wheelchair.

After interviewing all three top suspects, Cash and Tony conclude that they are all lying about something, but cannot conclude which, if any of them, is responsible for Mr. Lassiter's murder.

Scenes of the investigation are intercut with scenes from Cash's personal life, as he dates Mimi Barnes and copes with the fact that his daughter Sophie is leaving for college.

In several flashbacks, Cash and Tony are revealed to have first met when Tony was assigned to investigate the (still unsolved) murder of Cash's wife; Cash and his wife had been accosted by two thieves who shot Cash's wife while trying to steal her necklace; only one of the thieves was caught, although Tony has sworn to one day find the other. A scene in a restaurant, in which Cash mistakes a random man for the other thief, hints that Cash is still haunted by the murder.

== Cast ==
- Gene Wilder as Larry 'Cash' Carter
- Mike Starr as Lt. Tony Rossini
- Terry O'Quinn as Sidney Lassiter
- Cherry Jones as Mimi
- Frances Conroy as Martha Lassiter
- Deirdre O'Connell as Kate Faxton
- Ebon Moss-Bachrach as Billy
- Elisabeth Rosen as Sophie Carter
- Terri Hawkes as Esther
- David Fox as Walter Godlin
- Carlo Rota as Charles
- Matthew Edison as Albert Lassiter
- Ben Bass as Michael

== Production ==
"A&E wanted me to invent a character I'd like to play, an American, living in America. That's all," Gene Wilder said on the eve of the debut broadcast of Murder in a Small Town. "I said, 'I know exactly what you want – you don’t have to tell me.' I am their audience. I watch Sherlock Holmes, Inspector Morse, Cracker. I love a good mystery. I’d prefer to see a mystery to anything else."

"We heard through the grapevine that Gene really liked our mysteries and was interested in doing a mystery with us, so we jumped," said Brooke Bailey Johnson, executive vice president and general manager of A&E. "It was a great experience, a Vulcan mind-meld all the way, because we felt the same way about everything. He wrote the script, we loved it."

Wilder received an assurance that he could make as many of these films as he liked, on no set schedule, and he was given more than three months to write the script — a novelty in television.

"What also intrigued me, I could set my story in any period," Wilder said. "I don't belong in the 1990s. I get along OK, but I belong in another time, and I know it." Murder in a Small Town opens with Cash Carter as a member of a movie theater audience watching the climactic scene of the 1938 film Angels with Dirty Faces.

The script was written between January and April 1998. Wilder's writing partner was Gilbert Pearlman, his brother-in-law, a man with a varied career in promoting and producing theater, film and television.

"I'm very good with writing dialogue and characters and Gilbert is very good with creating the structure of a story, which is the hardest part for me," Wilder told an A&E interviewer. Setting the story in Stamford, Connecticut, came naturally; Wilder and his wife made their home there in an 18th-century house left to him by his late wife Gilda Radner.

Murder in a Small Town was shot in Toronto in August and September 1998, at locations including Parkwood Estate. Bruce Surtees was director of photography.

Although A&E planned to develop the Cash Carter mysteries as a franchise, only one sequel followed—The Lady in Question, broadcast December 12, 1999, on A&E. On January 30, 2000, Wilder was admitted to Memorial Sloan–Kettering Cancer Center for a stem-cell transplant, a followup to treatment he received in 1999 for non-Hodgkin lymphoma. Wilder checked in under the name Larry Carter, his character's name in the two A&E films.

== Reception ==
Murder in a Small Town was nominated for an Edgar Award for Best Television Feature or Miniseries in 2000.

Murder in a Small Town was the first of the A&E Original Movies, a series that grew to six to eight films annually over the next few years. At the time of broadcast it became the A&E Network's second-highest rated original movie ever—second only to Pride and Prejudice (1995), a miniseries that A&E coproduced with the BBC. Placing 13th in Nielsen's top 15 programs on basic cable networks for the week of January 4–10, 1999, Murder in a Small Town received a rating of 2.6 (2.55 million homes). The film drew a combined 3.4 million households with its encore showing at midnight ET (921,000).

"The high ratings of Murder in a Small Town guarantee that A&E will do more movies starring Wilder as Cash Carter," reported Variety. Encouraged by the record-breaking debut, A&E announced two more series of original movies focusing on American detectives: Spenser (Small Vices) and Nero Wolfe (The Golden Spiders: A Nero Wolfe Mystery).

== Home media ==
The film was released in 1999 by A&E Home Video on VHS, and then in 2002, also by A&E Home Video, on DVD.
