= Gene Wilder =

American actor (1933–2016)

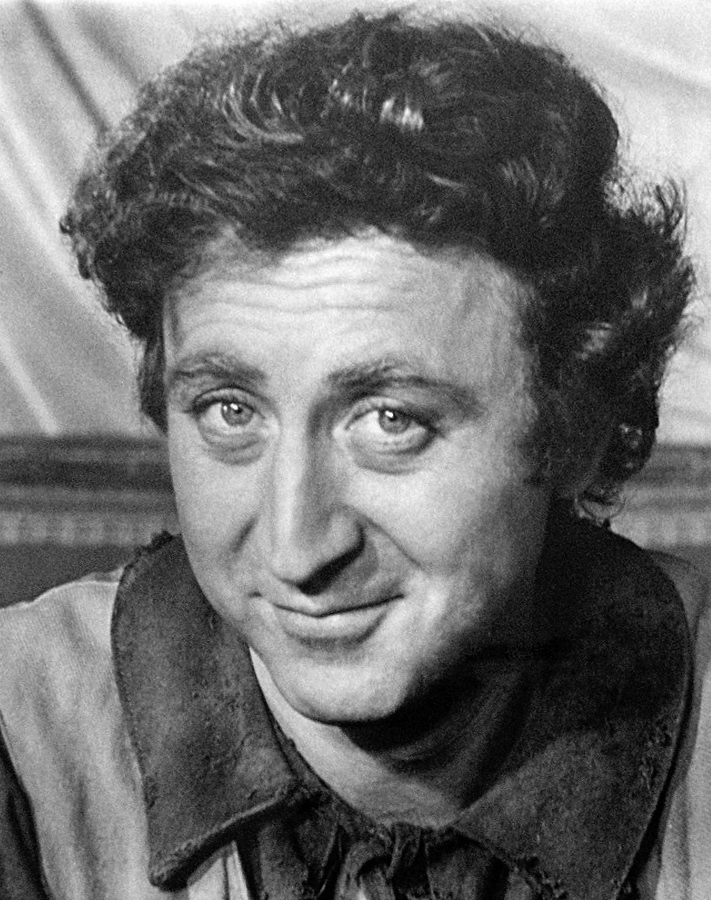
- Wilder in 1970
- Born: Jerome Silberman; June 11, 1933; Milwaukee, Wisconsin, U.S.
- Died: August 29, 2016 (aged 83); Stamford, Connecticut, U.S.
- Education: University of Iowa (B.A.); Bristol Old Vic Theatre School
- Occupations: Actor; comedian; writer; filmmaker
- Years active: 1959–2013
- Spouses: Mary Mercier (m. 1960; div. 1965) Mary Joan Schutz (m. 1967; div. 1974) Gilda Radner (m. 1984; died 1989) Karen Boyer (m. 1991)
- Children: 1 (adoptive)
- Relatives: Jordan Walker-Pearlman (nephew)
- Military career
- Allegiance: United States
- Branch: United States Army
- Service years: 1956–1958

Signature
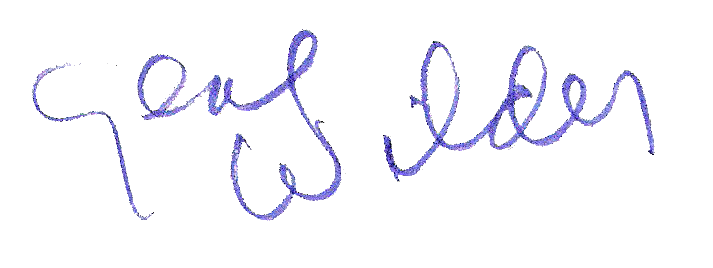

Gene Wilder (born Jerome Silberman; June 11, 1933 – August 29, 2016) was an American actor, comedian, writer and filmmaker. He was most notable for his comedic roles, including his collaborations with Mel Brooks on the films The Producers (1967), Blazing Saddles and Young Frankenstein (both 1974), and with Richard Pryor in the films Silver Streak (1976), Stir Crazy (1980), See No Evil, Hear No Evil (1989) and Another You (1991), as well as his portrayal of Willy Wonka in Willy Wonka & the Chocolate Factory (1971).

He began his career on stage, and made his screen debut in an episode of the television series The Play of the Week in 1961. His first film role was that of a hostage in the 1967 motion picture Bonnie and Clyde. His first major film role was as Leopold Bloom in the 1967 film The Producers, for which he was nominated for an Academy Award for Best Supporting Actor. It was the first in a series of collaborations with writer/director Mel Brooks, including Young Frankenstein, which Wilder co-wrote, garnering the pair an Academy Award nomination for Best Adapted Screenplay. He also starred in Woody Allen's Everything You Always Wanted to Know About Sex* (*But Were Afraid to Ask) (1972).

Wilder directed and wrote several of his own films, including The Woman in Red (1984). With his third wife, Gilda Radner, he starred in three films, the last two of which he also directed. Her 1989 death from ovarian cancer led to his active involvement in promoting cancer awareness and treatment, helping found the Gilda Radner Ovarian Cancer Detection Center in Los Angeles and co-founding Gilda's Club. After his last acting performance in 2003—a guest role on Will & Grace, for which he received a Primetime Emmy Award for Outstanding Guest Actor in a Comedy Series—Wilder turned his attention to writing. He produced a memoir, Kiss Me Like a Stranger (2005) and five other books.

== Early life and education ==
Wilder was born Jerome Silberman on June 11, 1933, in Milwaukee, Wisconsin, to a Russian Jewish family. He was the son of Jeanne (née Baer) and William J. Silberman, a manufacturer and salesman of novelty items. Wilder first became interested in acting at age eight, when his mother was diagnosed with rheumatic fever and the doctor told him to "try and make her laugh."

At the age of 11, he saw his sister, who was studying acting, performing onstage, and the experience enthraled him. He asked her teacher if he could become his student, and the teacher said that if he was still interested at age 13, he would take Wilder on as a student. The day after Wilder turned 13, he called the teacher, who accepted him; Wilder studied with him for two years.

When Jeanne Silberman felt that her son's potential was not being fully realized in Wisconsin, she sent him to Black-Foxe, a military institute in Hollywood, where he was bullied and sexually assaulted, primarily because he was the only Jewish boy in the school, according to his own account. After an unsuccessful short stay at Black-Foxe, Wilder returned home and became increasingly involved with the local theater community. He performed for the first time in front of a paying audience at age 15, as Balthasar (Romeo's servant) in a production of Shakespeare's Romeo and Juliet. Gene Wilder graduated from Washington High School in Milwaukee in 1951.

Wilder was raised Jewish, but he held only the Golden Rule as his philosophy. In a book published in 2005, he stated, "I have no other religion. I feel very Jewish and I feel very grateful to be Jewish. But I don't believe in God or anything to do with the Jewish religion."

Wilder studied Communication and Theatre Arts at the University of Iowa, where he was a member of the Alpha Epsilon Pi fraternity. Following his 1955 graduation from Iowa, he was accepted at the Bristol Old Vic Theatre School in Bristol, England. After six months of studying fencing, Wilder became the first freshman to win the All-School Fencing Championship. Desiring to study Stanislavski's system, he returned to the US, living with his sister and her family in Queens, New York City. He enrolled at the HB Studio.

== Military service ==
Wilder was drafted into the Army on September 10, 1956. At the end of recruit training, he was assigned to the medical corps and sent to Fort Sam Houston for training. He was then given the opportunity to choose any open post; wanting to stay near New York City to attend acting classes at the HB Studio, he chose to serve as paramedic in the Department of Psychiatry and Neurology at Valley Forge Army Hospital, in Phoenixville, Pennsylvania. In November 1957, his mother died from ovarian cancer. He was discharged from the army a year later and returned to New York. A scholarship to the HB Studio allowed him to become a full-time student. At first living on unemployment insurance and some savings, he later supported himself with odd jobs such as a limousine driver and fencing instructor.

== Acting career ==
=== 1959–1964: Early work and Broadway debut ===
Wilder's first professional acting job was in Cambridge, Massachusetts, where he played the Second Officer in Herbert Berghof's production of Twelfth Night in 1959. He also served as a fencing choreographer. After three years of study with Berghof and Uta Hagen at the HB Studio, Charles Grodin told Wilder about Lee Strasberg's method acting. Grodin persuaded him to leave the studio and begin studying with Strasberg in his private class. Several months later, Wilder was accepted into the Actors Studio. Feeling that "Jerry Silberman in Macbeth" did not have the right ring to it, he adopted a stage name. He chose "Wilder" because it reminded him of Our Town author Thornton Wilder, while "Gene" came from the character Eugene Gant in Thomas Wolfe's first novel, Look Homeward, Angel. He also liked "Gene" because as a boy, he was impressed by a distant relative, a World War II bomber navigator who was "handsome and looked great in his leather flight jacket". (Note: Wilder explained his decision to change his name: "I had always liked Gene because of Thomas Wolfe's character Eugene Gant in Look Homeward, Angel and Of Time and the River. And I was always a great admirer of Thornton Wilder.") He later said that he could not see Gene Wilder playing Macbeth, either.

After joining the Actors Studio, he slowly began to be noticed in the off-Broadway scene, thanks to performances in Sir Arnold Wesker's Roots and in Graham Greene's The Complaisant Lover, for which Wilder received the Clarence Derwent Award for "Best Performance by an Actor in a Nonfeatured Role". One of Wilder's early stage credits was playing the socially awkward mental patient Billy Bibbit in the original 1963–64 Broadway adaptation of Ken Kesey's novel One Flew Over the Cuckoo's Nest opposite star Kirk Douglas. Wilder also had commercial work; in 1967, he voiced a man's stomach in an animated Alka-Seltzer advertisement made by cartoonist R.O. Blechman.

=== 1967–1974: Collaborations with Mel Brooks ===
In 1963, Wilder was cast in a leading role in Mother Courage and Her Children, a production starring Anne Bancroft, who introduced Wilder to her boyfriend (and later husband) Mel Brooks. A few months later, Brooks mentioned that he was working on a screenplay called Springtime for Hitler, for which he thought Wilder would be perfect in the role of Leo Bloom. Brooks elicited a promise from Wilder that he would check with him before making any long-term commitments. Months went by, and Wilder toured the country with different theater productions, participated in a televised CBS presentation of Death of a Salesman, and was cast for his first role in a film—a minor role in Arthur Penn's 1967 Bonnie and Clyde. After three years of not hearing from Brooks, Wilder was called for a reading with Zero Mostel, who was to be the star of Springtime for Hitler and had approval of his co-star. Mostel approved, and Wilder was cast for his first leading role in a feature film, 1967's The Producers.

The Producers eventually became a cult comedy classic, with Mel Brooks winning an Academy Award for Best Original Screenplay and Wilder being nominated for an Academy Award for Best Supporting Actor. Nevertheless, Brooks' first directorial effort did not do well at the box office and was not well received by all critics; New York Times critic Renata Adler reviewed the film and described it as "black college humor".

In 1969, Wilder relocated to Paris, accepting a leading role in Bud Yorkin's Start the Revolution Without Me, a comedy that took place during the French Revolution. After shooting ended, Wilder returned to New York, where he read the script for Quackser Fortune Has a Cousin in the Bronx and immediately called Sidney Glazier, who produced The Producers. Both men began searching for the perfect director for the film. Jean Renoir was the first candidate, but he would not be able to do the film for at least a year, so British-Indian director Waris Hussein was hired. With Margot Kidder co-starring with Wilder, it was filmed on location in Dublin, and at the nearby Ardmore Studios, in August and September 1969.

In 1971, Wilder auditioned to play Willy Wonka in Mel Stuart's film adaptation of Roald Dahl's Charlie and the Chocolate Factory. After reciting some lines, director Mel Stuart immediately offered him the role. Before Wilder was officially cast for the role, Fred Astaire, Joel Grey, Ron Moody, and Jon Pertwee were all considered. Spike Milligan was Roald Dahl's original choice to play Willy Wonka. Peter Sellers even begged Dahl for the role.

The film was not a big success on its opening weekend, although it received positive reviews from critics such as Roger Ebert, who compared it to The Wizard of Oz. The film currently holds a 92% "Fresh" rating on Rotten Tomatoes with the critical consensus stating "Willy Wonka & the Chocolate Factory is strange yet comforting, full of narrative detours that don't always work but express the film's uniqueness."

The three films Wilder appeared in following The Producers were box office failures: Start the Revolution and Quackser seemed to audiences poor copies of Mel Brooks films, while Willy Wonka & the Chocolate Factory was not a commercial success, although it later gained a cult following and an Oscar nomination for Best Score, as well as a Golden Globe award nomination for Wilder.

When Woody Allen offered him a role in one segment of Everything You Always Wanted to Know About Sex* (*But Were Afraid to Ask), Wilder accepted, hoping this would be the hit to put an end to his series of flops. Everything ... was a hit, grossing over $18 million in the United States alone against a $2-million budget.

After Everything You Always Wanted to Know About Sex* (*But Were Afraid to Ask), Wilder began working on a script he called Young Frankenstein. After he wrote a two-page scenario, he called Mel Brooks, who told him that it seemed like a "cute" idea, but showed little interest. A few months later, Wilder received a call from his agent, Mike Medavoy, who asked if he had anything where he could include Peter Boyle and Marty Feldman, his two new clients. Having just seen Feldman on television, Wilder was inspired to write a scene that takes place at Transylvania Station, where Igor and Frederick meet for the first time. The scene was later included in the film almost verbatim. Medavoy liked the idea and called Brooks, asking him to direct. Brooks was not convinced, but having spent four years working on two box-office failures, he decided to accept. While working on the Young Frankenstein script, Wilder was offered the part of the Fox in the musical film adaptation of Antoine de Saint-Exupéry's classic book, The Little Prince. When filming was about to begin in London, Wilder received an urgent call from Brooks, who was filming Blazing Saddles, offering Wilder the role of the "Waco Kid" after Dan Dailey dropped out at the last minute, while Gig Young became too ill to continue. Wilder shot his scenes for Blazing Saddles and immediately afterwards filmed The Little Prince.

After Young Frankenstein was written, the rights were to be sold to Columbia Pictures, but after having trouble agreeing on the budget, Wilder, Brooks, and producer Michael Gruskoff went with 20th Century Fox, where both Brooks and Wilder had to sign five-year contracts. Young Frankenstein was a commercial success, with Wilder and Brooks receiving Best Adapted Screenplay nominations at the 1974 Oscars, losing to Francis Coppola and Mario Puzo for their adaptation of The Godfather Part II. While filming Young Frankenstein, Wilder had an idea for a romantic musical comedy about a brother of Sherlock Holmes. Marty Feldman and Madeline Kahn agreed to participate in the project, and Wilder began writing what became his directorial début, 1975's The Adventure of Sherlock Holmes' Smarter Brother.

=== 1975–1989: Films with Richard Pryor ===
In 1975, Wilder's agent sent him a script for a film called Super Chief. Wilder accepted, but told the film's producers that he thought the only person who could keep the film from being offensive was Richard Pryor. Pryor accepted the role in the film, which had been renamed Silver Streak, the first film to team Wilder and Pryor. They became Hollywood's first successful interracial movie comedy duo. While filming Silver Streak, Wilder began working on a script for The World's Greatest Lover, inspired by Fellini's The White Sheik. Wilder wrote, produced, and directed The World's Greatest Lover, which premièred in 1977, but was a critical failure. The Frisco Kid (1979) was Wilder's next project. The film was to star John Wayne, but he dropped out and was replaced by Harrison Ford, then an up-and-coming actor.

For some reason when you pair him [Pryor] with Gene Wilder, they make a particular kind of magic together. And, together, they are probably the funniest pair that's ever been on screen.

— Sidney Poitier

In 1980, Wilder teamed up again with Richard Pryor in Stir Crazy, directed by Sidney Poitier. Pryor was struggling with a severe cocaine addiction, and filming became difficult, but once the film premiered, it became an international success. New York magazine listed "Skip Donahue" (Wilder) and "Harry Monroe" (Pryor) as number nine on their 2007 list of "The Fifteen Most Dynamic Duos in Pop Culture History", and the film has often appeared in "best comedy" lists and rankings.

Poitier and Wilder became friends, with the pair working together on a script called Traces—which became 1982's Hanky Panky, the film where Wilder met comedian Gilda Radner. Through the remainder of the decade, Wilder and Radner worked on several projects together. After Hanky Panky, Wilder directed his third film, 1984's The Woman in Red, which starred Wilder, Radner, and Kelly LeBrock. The Woman in Red was not well received by the critics, nor was their next project, 1986's Haunted Honeymoon, which failed to attract audiences. The Woman in Red did win an Academy Award for Best Original Song for Stevie Wonder's song "I Just Called to Say I Love You".

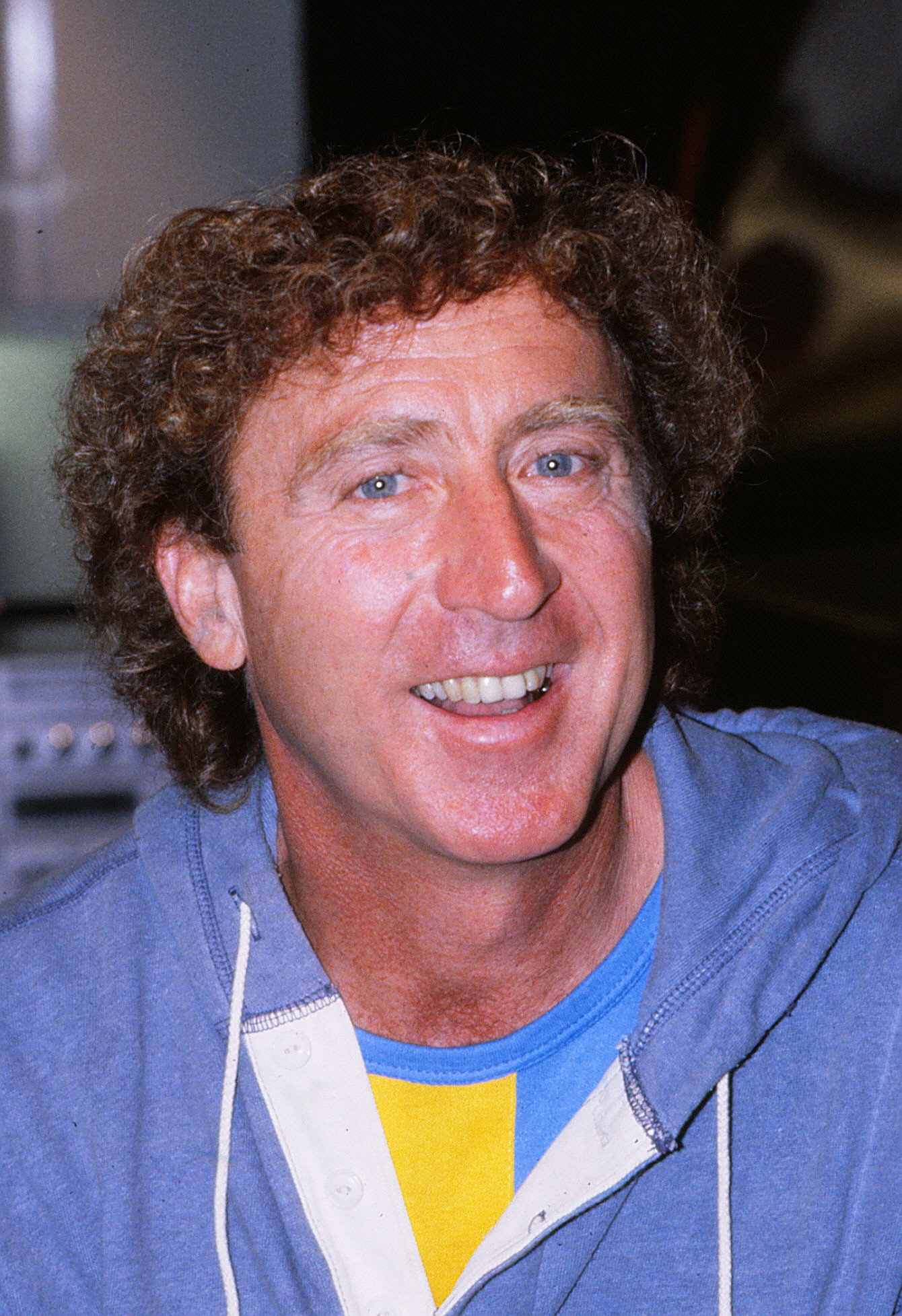
Wilder in 1984

TriStar Pictures wanted to produce another film starring Wilder and Pryor, and Wilder agreed to do See No Evil, Hear No Evil only if he were allowed to rewrite the script. The studio agreed, and See No Evil, Hear No Evil premiered in May 1989 to mostly negative reviews. Many critics praised Wilder and Pryor, as well as Kevin Spacey's performance, but they mostly agreed that the script was terrible. Roger Ebert called it "a real dud"; the Deseret Morning News described the film as "stupid", with an "idiotic script" that had a "contrived story" and too many "juvenile gags", while Vincent Canby called it "by far the most successful co-starring vehicle for Mr. Pryor and Mr. Wilder", also acknowledging that "this is not elegant movie making, and not all of the gags are equally clever".

=== 1990–2005: Later years and final roles ===
After starring as a political cartoonist who falls in love in the 1990 film Funny About Love, Wilder performed in one final movie with Pryor, the 1991 feature Another You, in which Pryor's physical deterioration from multiple sclerosis was clearly noticeable. It was Pryor's last starring role in a film (he appeared in a few cameos before he died in 2005) and also marked Wilder's last appearance in a feature film. His last two movies were not financially successful. Wilder's remaining work consisted of television movies and guest appearances in TV shows.

Wilder was inducted into the Wisconsin Performing Arts Hall of Fame, at the Marcus Center for the Performing Arts in Milwaukee, on April 9, 1991.

In 1994, Wilder starred in the NBC sitcom Something Wilder. The show received poor reviews and lasted only one season. He went back to the small screen in 1999, appearing in three television movies, one of which was the NBC adaptation of Alice in Wonderland. The other two, Murder in a Small Town and The Lady in Question, were mystery movies for A&E TV that were cowritten by Wilder, in which he played a theater director turned amateur detective.

Three years later, Wilder guest-starred on two episodes of NBC's Will & Grace, winning a Primetime Emmy Award for Outstanding Guest Actor on a Comedy Series for his role as Mr. Stein, Will Truman's boss. This was the final role of Wilder's screen career; from 2003 until his death, he focused his creative energies on writing novels and stories, as well as painting.

== Personal life ==
=== Relationships ===
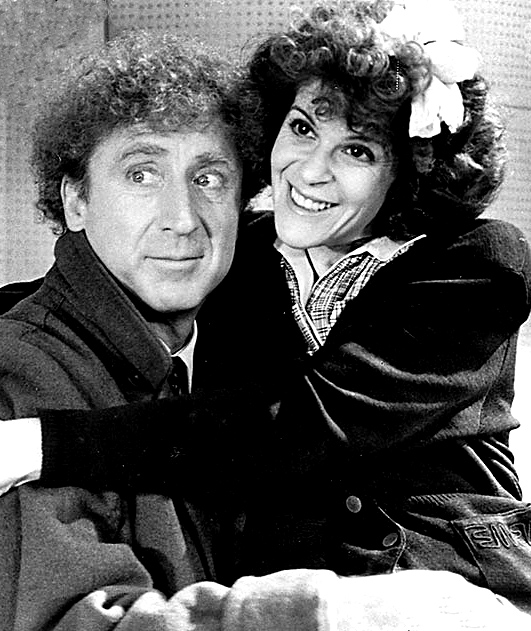
Wilder with Gilda Radner, 1986

Wilder met his first wife, Mary Mercier, while studying at the HB Studio in New York. Although the couple had not been together long, they married on July 22, 1960. They spent long periods of time apart, eventually divorcing in 1965. A few months later, Wilder began dating Mary Joan Schutz, a friend of his sister. Schutz had a daughter, Katharine, from a previous marriage. When Katharine started calling Wilder "Dad", he decided to do what he felt was "the right thing to do", marrying Schutz on October 27, 1967, and adopting Katharine that same year. Schutz and Wilder separated after seven years of marriage, with Katharine suspecting that Wilder was having an affair with his Young Frankenstein co-star, Madeline Kahn. After the divorce, he briefly dated his other Frankenstein co-star, Teri Garr. Wilder eventually became estranged from Katharine.

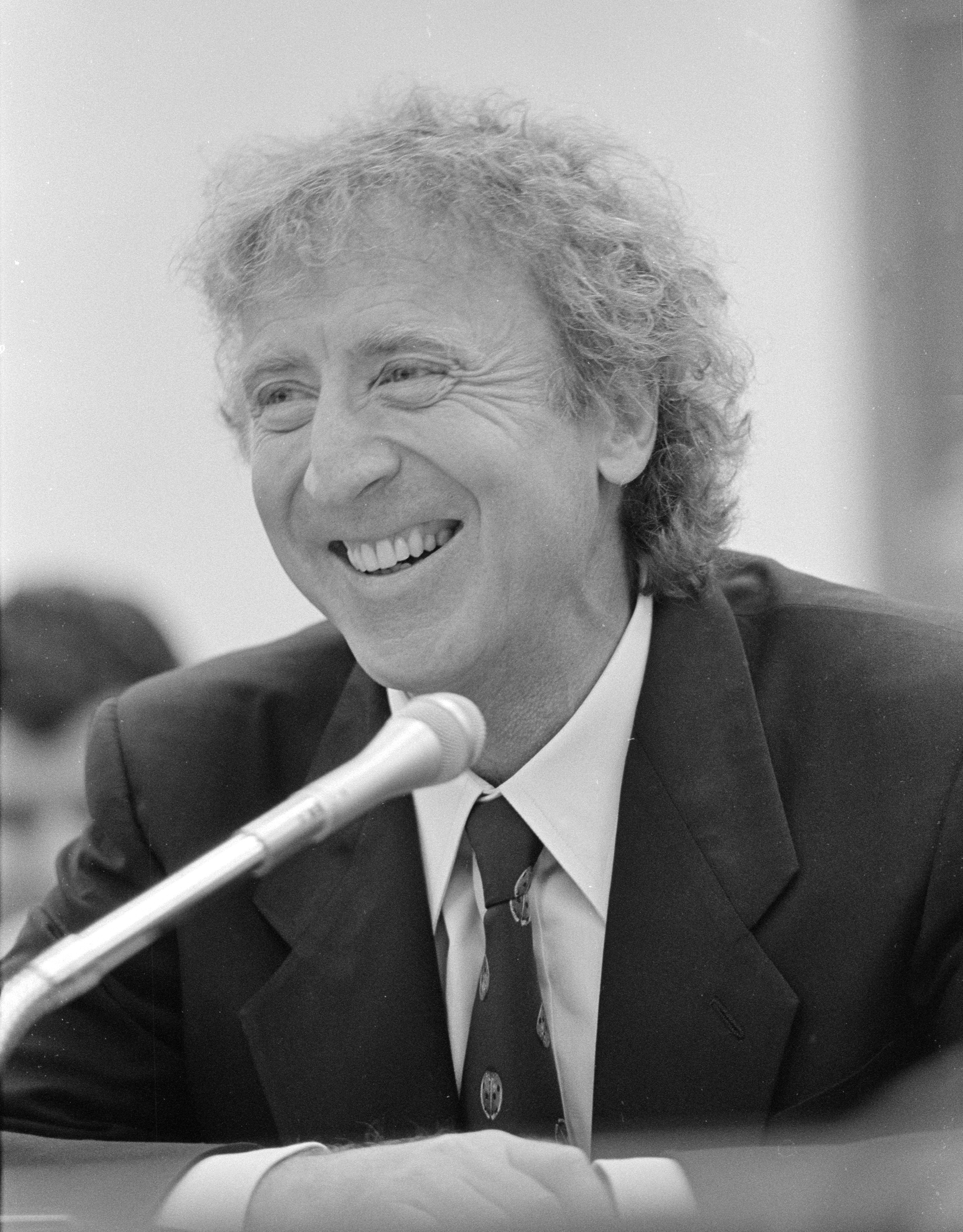
Wilder speaking in front of a House Appropriations subcommittee on ovarian cancer research

Wilder met Saturday Night Live actress Gilda Radner on August 13, 1981, while filming Sidney Poitier's Hanky Panky. Radner was married to guitarist G. E. Smith at the time, but she and Wilder became inseparable friends. When the filming of Hanky Panky ended, Wilder found himself missing Radner, so he called her. The relationship grew, and Radner eventually divorced Smith in 1982. She moved in with Wilder, and the couple married on September 14, 1984, in the south of France. The couple wanted to have children, but Radner suffered miscarriages, and doctors could not determine the problem. After experiencing severe fatigue and suffering from pain in her upper legs on the set of Haunted Honeymoon, Radner sought medical treatment. Following a number of false diagnoses, she was found to have ovarian cancer in October 1986. Over the next year and a half, Radner battled the disease, receiving chemotherapy and radiotherapy treatments. The disease finally went into remission, giving the couple a respite, during which time Wilder filmed See No Evil, Hear No Evil. By May 1989, the cancer returned and had metastasized. Radner died on May 20, 1989. Wilder later stated, "I always thought she'd pull through."

Following Radner's death, Wilder became active in promoting cancer awareness and treatment, helping found the Gilda Radner Ovarian Cancer Detection Center in Los Angeles and co-founding Gilda's Club, a support group to raise awareness of cancer that began in New York City and now has branches throughout the country.

While preparing for his role as a deaf man in See No Evil, Hear No Evil, Wilder met Karen Webb (née Boyer), who was a clinical supervisor for the New York League for the Hard of Hearing. Webb coached him in lip reading. Following Gilda Radner's death, Wilder and Webb reconnected, and on September 8, 1991, they married.

=== Semi-retirement ===
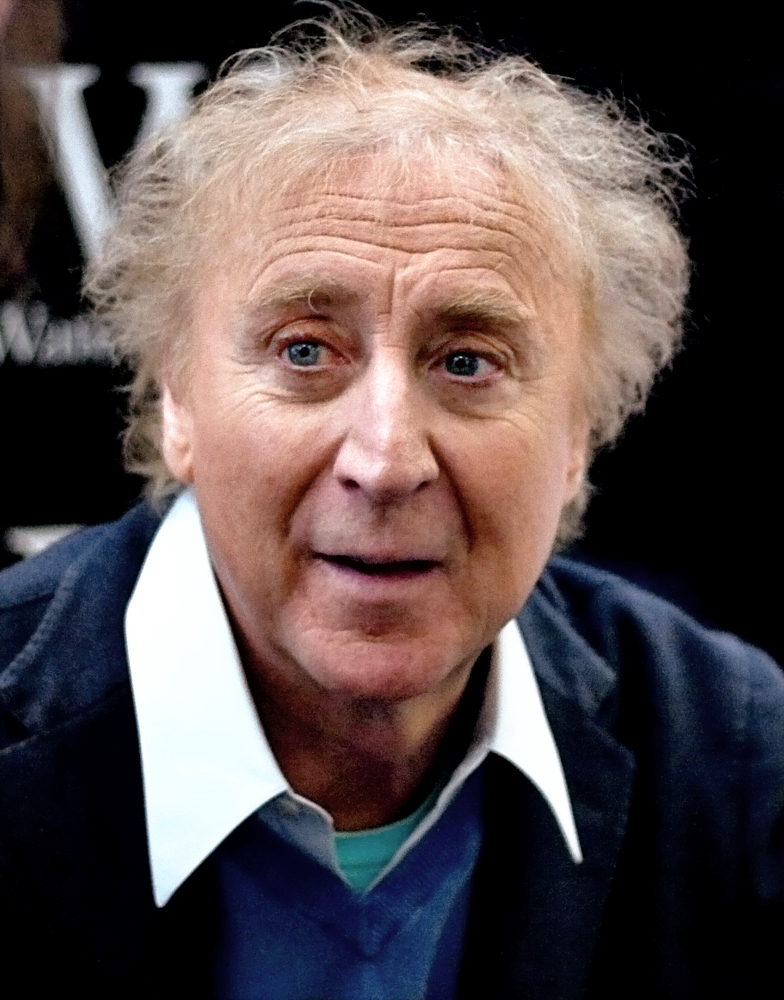
Wilder at a book signing in 2007

The Wilders spent most of their time painting watercolors, writing, and participating in charitable efforts. In 1998, Wilder collaborated on the book Gilda's Disease with oncologist Steven Piver, sharing Radner's personal experiences with ovarian cancer. Wilder himself was hospitalized with non-Hodgkin lymphoma in 1999, but confirmed in March 2005 that the cancer was in complete remission following chemotherapy and a stem cell transplant.

In October 2001, he read from Charlie and the Chocolate Factory as part of a special benefit performance held at the Westport Country Playhouse to aid families affected by the September 11 attacks. Also in 2001, Wilder donated a collection of scripts, correspondences, documents, photographs, and clipped images to the University of Iowa Libraries.

On March 1, 2005, Wilder released his highly personal memoir, Kiss Me Like a Stranger: My Search for Love and Art, an account of his life covering everything from his childhood up to Radner's death. Two years later, in March 2007, Wilder released his first novel, My French Whore, which is set during World War I. His second novel, The Woman Who Wouldn't, was released in March 2008.

In a 2008 Turner Classic Movies special, Role Model: Gene Wilder, where Alec Baldwin interviewed Wilder about his career, Wilder said that he was basically retired from acting for good. "I don't like show business, I realized," he explained. "I like show, but I don't like the business."

In 2010, Wilder released a collection of stories called What Is This Thing Called Love? His third novel, Something to Remember You By: A Perilous Romance, was released in April 2013.

When asked in a 2013 Time Out New York magazine interview whether he would act again if a suitable film project came his way, Wilder responded, "I'm tired of watching the bombing, shooting, killing, swearing and 3-D. I get 52 movies a year sent to me, and maybe there are three good [ones]. That's why I went into writing. It's not that I wouldn't act again. I'd say, 'Give me the script. If it's something wonderful, I'll do it.' But I don't get anything like that."

In the 2010s, a still from the movie Willy Wonka & the Chocolate Factory featuring Wilder became a popular Internet meme known as Condescending Wonka.

=== Political views ===
In 2007, Wilder stated, "I'm quietly political. I don't like advertising. Giving money to someone or support, but not getting on a bandstand. I don't want to run for president in 2008. I will write another book instead." Wilder donated to Barack Obama's 2008 presidential campaign.

== Death and legacy ==
On August 29, 2016, at the age of 83, Wilder died at his home in Stamford, Connecticut, from complications of Alzheimer's disease. He had been diagnosed three years before his death but kept knowledge of his condition private. Wilder's nephew Jordan Walker-Pearlman said that this was done to not sadden fans of Willy Wonka & the Chocolate Factory, stating:

The decision to wait until this time to disclose his condition wasn't vanity, but more so that the countless young children that would smile or call out to him 'there's Willy Wonka,' would not have to be then exposed to an adult referencing illness or trouble and causing delight to travel to worry, disappointment, or confusion. He simply couldn't bear the idea of one less smile in the world.

According to his family, Wilder died while listening to one of his favorite songs, a rendition of "Over the Rainbow" sung by Ella Fitzgerald.

Mel Brooks, as a guest on The Tonight Show Starring Jimmy Fallon, spoke about his grief, stating: "He was such a dear friend. I expected that he would go—but when it happens, it's still tremendous. It's a big shock. I'm still reeling. No more Gene? ... He was such a wonderful part of my life."

Various celebrities posted tributes to Wilder on Twitter including Carl Reiner, Albert Brooks, Billy Crystal, Julia Louis-Dreyfus, and Russell Crowe.

Wilder was included in the Academy of Motion Pictures Arts and Sciences In Memoriam montage during the 2017 Oscars telecast.

In May 2023, Remembering Gene Wilder, a documentary film produced by Julie Nimoy and David Knight, premiered at the Los Angeles Jewish Film Festival.

Jonathan Randell Silver portrayed Wilder in 2024 and 2025 productions of Gene & Gilda, a play by Cary Gitter about Wilder's years with Gilda Radner.

== Filmography ==
=== Film ===
Year	Title	Role	Notes
1967	Bonnie and Clyde	Eugene Grizzard	
1967	The Producers	Leopold "Leo" Bloom	
1970	Start the Revolution Without Me	Claude / Philippe	
1970	Quackser Fortune Has a Cousin in the Bronx	Aloysius "Quackser" Fortune	
1971	Willy Wonka & the Chocolate Factory	Willy Wonka	
1972	Everything You Always Wanted to Know About Sex* (*But Were Afraid to Ask)	Dr. Doug Ross	"What Is Sodomy?" segment
1974	Rhinoceros	Stanley	
1974	Blazing Saddles	Jim, "The Waco Kid"	
1974	The Little Prince	The Fox	
1974	Young Frankenstein	Dr. Frederick Frankenstein	Also writer
1975	The Adventure of Sherlock Holmes' Smarter Brother	Sigerson Holmes	Also director and writer
1976	Silver Streak	George Caldwell	
1977	The World's Greatest Lover	Rudy Hickman	Also producer, director, and writer
1979	The Frisco Kid	Avram Belinski	
1980	Sunday Lovers	Skippy	Directed "Skippy" segment
1980	Stir Crazy	Skip Donahue	
1982	Hanky Panky	Michael Jordon	
1984	The Woman in Red	Teddy Pierce	Also director and writer
1986	Haunted Honeymoon	Larry Abbot	Also director and writer
1989	See No Evil, Hear No Evil	Dave Lyons	Also writer
1990	Funny About Love	Duffy Bergman	
1991	Another You	George / Abe Fielding	
2005	Expo: Magic of the White City	Narrator	Documentary (Final film role)

=== Television ===
Year	Title	Role	Notes
1961	The Play of the Week	Happy Penny	Episode: "The Wingless Victory"
1962	Armstrong Circle Theatre	Yussel	Episode: "The Man Who Refused to Die"
1962	The Defenders	Waiter	Episode: "Reunion with Death"
1962–1963	The DuPont Show of the Week	Muller / Wilson / Reporter	3 episodes
1966	The Eternal Light	Yonkel	Episode: "Home for Passover"
1966	Death of a Salesman	Bernard	TV film
1972–1977	The Electric Company	Letterman (Voice)	The Adventures of Letterman segment
1972	The Scarecrow	Lord Ravensbane / The Scarecrow	TV film
1974	Thursday's Game	Harry Evers	TV film
1993	Eligible Dentist	Toby	TV pilot episode
1994–1995	Something Wilder	Gene Bergman	18 episodes
1999	Murder in a Small Town	Larry "Cash" Carter	TV film, co-writer with Gilbert Pearlman
1999	Alice in Wonderland	The Mock Turtle	TV film
1999	The Lady in Question	Larry "Cash" Carter	TV film, co-writer with Gilbert Pearlman
2002–2003	Will & Grace	Mr. Stein	2 episodes
2026	Wonka's The Golden Ticket	Willy Wonka	Archival voice recordings, 9 episodes

== Theater ==
Year	Title	Role	Playwright	Venue	Ref.
1961	The Complaisant Lover	Hotel Valet	Graham Greene	Ethel Barrymore Theatre, Broadway	
1961	Roots	Frankie Bryant	Arnold Wesker	Mayfair Theatre, Off-Broadway	
1963	Mother Courage and Her Children	Chaplain	Bertolt Brecht	Martin Beck Theatre, Broadway	
1963	One Flew Over the Cuckoo's Nest	Billy Bibbit	Ken Kesey	Cort Theatre, Broadway	
1964	Dynamite Tonight	Smiley	Arnold Weinstein	York Playhouse, Off-Broadway	
1964	The White House	Various roles	A. E. Hotchner	Henry Miller's Theatre, Broadway	
1966	Luv	Harry Berlin (replacement)	Murray Schisgal	Helen Hayes Theatre, Broadway	
1996	Laughter on the 23rd Floor	Max Prince	Neil Simon	Sondheim Theatre, West End	

== Awards and nominations ==
Award	Year	Category	Work	Result	Ref.
Academy Awards	1968	Best Supporting Actor	The Producers	Nominated	
Academy Awards	1974	Best Adapted Screenplay	Young Frankenstein	Nominated	
Clarence Derwent Awards	1962	Best Actor in a Nonfeatured Role	The Complaisant Lover	Won	
Golden Globe Awards	1971	Best Actor – Motion Picture Musical or Comedy	Willy Wonka & the Chocolate Factory	Nominated	
Golden Globe Awards	1976	Best Actor – Motion Picture Musical or Comedy	Silver Streak	Nominated	
Nebula Award	1976	Best Script	Young Frankenstein	Won	
Primetime Emmy Awards	2003	Outstanding Guest Actor in a Comedy Series	Will & Grace	Won	

== Bibliography ==
- Radner, Gilda (1989). It's Always Something. Simon and Schuster. ISBN 0671638688.
- Piver, M. Steven; Wilder, Gene (1998). Gilda's Disease: Sharing Personal Experiences and a Medical Perspective On Ovarian Cancer. Broadway Books. ISBN 076790138X.
- Piver, M. Steven; Wilder, Gene (1998). Gilda's Disease: Sharing Personal Experiences and a Medical Perspective on Ovarian Cancer (Paperback ed.). New York City: Three Rivers Press. ISBN 9780767901383.
- Wilder, Gene (2005). Kiss Me Like a Stranger: My Search for Love and Art. St. Martin's Press. ISBN 031233706X.
- Wilder, Gene (2006). Kiss Me Like a Stranger: My Search for Love and Art (Revised ed.). St. Martin's Press. ISBN 9780312337070.
- Wilder, Gene (2007). My French Whore (Revised ed.). St. Martin's Press. ISBN 9780312377991.
- Wilder, Gene (2008). The Woman Who Wouldn't (1st ed.). St. Martin's Press. ISBN 9780312375782.
- Wilder, Gene (2010). What Is This Thing Called Love? (1st ed.). St. Martin's Press. ISBN 9780312598907.
- Wilder, Gene (2013). Something to Remember You By: A Perilous Romance (1st ed.). St. Martin's Press. ISBN 9780312598914.
- Wilder, Gene (2017). Even Dogs Learn How to Swim (1st ed.). One Tusk Publishing. ISBN 9780984485697.
