= Bruce Surtees =

American cinematographer (1937–2012)

- Born: Bruce Mohr Powell Surtees; August 3, 1937; Los Angeles, California, U.S.
- Died: February 23, 2012 (aged 74); Carmel, California, U.S.
- Education: ArtCenter College of Design
- Years active: 1955–2002
- Father: Robert Surtees

Bruce Mohr Powell Surtees (August 3, 1937 – February 23, 2012) was an American cinematographer, best known for his collaboration with Clint Eastwood.

He was nominated for an Academy Award for Best Cinematography for his work on Lenny (1974).

== Early life and education ==
Surtees was born in Los Angeles, in 1937, as the son of three-time Oscar-winning cinematographer Robert L. Surtees and Maydell Lois James. Surtees was given the middle name "Mohr" after his father's mentor Hal Mohr. He studied at the ArtCenter College of Design.

== Career ==
Surtees worked as an animation technician at Walt Disney Pictures before becoming a camera assistant under his father's direction for The Hallelujah Trail and Lost Command.

He formed a close friendship with Don Siegel and Clint Eastwood, serving as a camera operator for Coogan's Bluff and Two Mules for Sister Sara. Impressed by Surtees' camera work, Siegel made him the cinematographer for The Beguiled and Dirty Harry. Surtees worked as a cinematographer on several of Eastwood's films, including Play Misty for Me, High Plains Drifter, The Outlaw Josey Wales, and Sudden Impact.

He was nominated for an Academy Award for Best Cinematography for his work on Lenny (1974), Bob Fosse's biopic of comedian Lenny Bruce. Starting in the mid-1990's, Surtees mostly worked on made-for-television films, and was nominated for an Emmy Award for Dash and Lilly (1999).

Surtees was affectionately nicknamed the "Prince of Darkness" for his low-key lighting.

== Personal life and death ==
Surtees was married twice. He met his second wife Carol Buby while scouting locations for Inchon in Seoul, South Korea. He had a daughter, Suzanne Surtees, from his first marriage.

Surtees died from complications from diabetes on February 23, 2012, at the age of 74.

== Filmography ==
Film

Year	Title	Director	Notes
1971	The Beguiled	Don Siegel	
1971	Play Misty for Me	Clint Eastwood	
1971	Dirty Harry	Don Siegel	
1972	The Great Northfield, Minnesota Raid	Philip Kaufman	
1972	Conquest of the Planet of the Apes	J. Lee Thompson	
1972	Joe Kidd	John Sturges	
1973	High Plains Drifter	Clint Eastwood	
1973	Blume in Love	Paul Mazursky	
1973	The Outfit	John Flynn	
1974	Lenny	Bob Fosse	
1975	Night Moves	Arthur Penn	Credited as "Pierre William Glenn"
1976	Sparkle	Sam O'Steen	
1976	Leadbelly	Gordon Parks	
1976	The Outlaw Josey Wales	Clint Eastwood	
1976	The Shootist	Don Siegel	
1977	Three Warriors	Kieth Merrill	
1978	Big Wednesday	John Milius	
1978	Movie Movie	Stanley Donen	Segment "Baxter's Beauties of 1933"
1979	Dreamer	Noel Nosseck	
1979	Escape from Alcatraz	Don Siegel	
1981	Inchon	Terence Young	
1982	Firefox	Clint Eastwood	
1982	White Dog	Samuel Fuller	
1982	Ladies and Gentlemen, The Fabulous Stains	Lou Adler	
1982	Honkytonk Man	Clint Eastwood	
1983	Bad Boys	Rick Rosenthal	With Donald E. Thorin
1983	Risky Business	Paul Brickman	With Reynaldo Villalobos
1983	Sudden Impact	Clint Eastwood	
1984	Tightrope	Richard Tuggle	
1984	Beverly Hills Cop	Martin Brest	
1985	Pale Rider	Clint Eastwood	
1986	Psycho III	Anthony Perkins	
1986	Out of Bounds	Richard Tuggle	
1986	Ratboy	Sondra Locke	
1987	Back to the Beach	Lyndall Hobbs	
1988	License to Drive	Greg Beeman	
1990	Men Don't Leave	Paul Brickman	
1991	Run	Geoff Burrowes	
1991	The Super	Rod Daniel	
1992	That Night	Craig Bolotin	
1993	The Crush	Alan Shapiro	
1994	Corrina, Corrina	Jessie Nelson	
1995	The Stars Fell on Henrietta	James Keach	
1996	The Substitute	Robert Mandel	
1998	Just a Little Harmless Sex	Rick Rosenthal	
2002	Joshua	Jon Purdy	

TV movies

Year	Title	Director	Notes
1974	Hello Mother, Goodbye!	Peter H. Hunt	
1991	Chains of Gold	Rod Holcomb	With Dariusz Wolski
1994	The Birds II: Land's End	Rick Rosenthal	
1999	Murder in a Small Town	Joyce Chopra	
1999	Dash and Lilly	Kathy Bates	
1999	That Championship Season	Paul Sorvino	
1999	Lethal Vows	Paul Schneider	
1999	The Lady in Question	Joyce Chopra	
2000	Thin Air	Robert Mandel	
2000	American Tragedy	Lawrence Schiller	
2001	And Never Let Her Go	Peter Levin	

== Accolades ==
Year	Award	Category	Title	Result	Ref.
1975	Academy Awards	Best Cinematography	Lenny	Nominated	
1999	Primetime Emmy Award	Outstanding Cinematography for a Limited Series or Movie	Dash and Lilly	Nominated	
