= My French Whore =

Comedic spy romance novel by Gene Wilder

- Author: Gene Wilder
- Language: English
- Genre: Novel
- Publisher: St. Martin's Press
- Publication date: 2007
- Publication place: United States
- Media type: Print (hardback & paperback)
- ISBN: 0-312-36057-6
- Preceded by: Kiss Me Like a Stranger: My Search for Love and Art (2005)
- Followed by: The Woman Who Wouldn't (2008)

My French Whore is a 2007 comedic spy romance novel written by the American actor, director, screenwriter and author, Gene Wilder.

== Plot summary ==
Set towards the end of World War I, in 1918, it tells the story of a shy young railway employee and amateur actor from Milwaukee named Paul Peachy. Having realized that his wife no longer loves him, Paul enlists as a private in the U.S. Army and boards a ship for the trenches of France.

Peachy finds temporary solace in friendship amid horrors of war, but is soon captured by the enemy Germans in no man's land. His only chance of survival is to impersonate one of the enemy's most famous spies (as a child of immigrants, he is a fluent German speaker).

As the accomplished spy Harry Stroller, Peachy is feted as a hero by the German top brass and gains access to a previously unimagined world of sumptuous living. But his new role also reveals inner reserves of courage and ingenuity he never knew he possessed, as the mounting suspicions of his German hosts force Peachy into ever more deceptions.

In this atmosphere of smoke and mirrors, Paul Peachy falls in love with Annie, a beautiful French courtesan who seems to see through his artful disguise.

== Review and criticism ==
My French Whore is a romantic comedy of errors and deceptions. A reviewer stated that the "writing [is] sparse but perfect, and the dialogue [is] wonderful." In presenting his book, Gene Wilder himself wrote on a blog: My French Whore is my memo to the masses who cried out Give us more of the same! Very well, liebchens. You would like to re-live the black comedy of The Producers? I give you the madcap tale of an American soldier who impersonates a German spy, with hilarious but sombre results. Picture much hollering, in German! SCHNELL und ACHTUNG! Other reviewers have written that Wilder's character development was scarce and irregular, whereas still others stated that Wilder's novel was a touching debut novel "a simple, straight-faced love story about a brave coward and a scarlet," where the language was humorous, with characters who had depth and charm. Finally, a writer for the Los Angeles Times wrote that "Wilder’s delightful fiction debut (is) a novel so witty, dramatic and romantic that the reader is left with an indelible mental movie."

Overall, Wilder's first novel had a fair reception and good sales.
