= Making a Killing =

2018 crime-mystery film directed by Devin Hume

- Film poster
- Directed by: Devin Hume
- Written by: Devin Hume; Jamie Pelz
- Produced by: Devin Hume; Jamie Pelz; Seth Tonk
- Starring: Mike Starr; Jude Moran; Michael Jai White; Christopher Lloyd; Alaina Warren Zachary
- Cinematography: Peter Wigand
- Edited by: Robert Farish
- Music by: Peter G. Adams
- Production company: CanAmPac3
- Distributed by: Cleopatra Entertainment
- Release date: August 10, 2018 (Los Angeles)
- Running time: 106 minutes
- Countries: United States; Canada
- Language: English

Making a Killing is a 2018 Canadian-American crime-mystery film co-written, co-produced and directed by Devin Hume. The movie starring Mike Starr, Jude Moran, Michael Jai White and Christopher Lloyd was limited release in Los Angeles on August 10, 2018.

== Plot ==
When Arthur and Vincent Herring are asked to keep a collection of rare coins worth a fortune, they plan never return the collection to its owner.

== Cast ==
- Mike Starr as Arthur Herring
- Jude Moran as Vincent Herring
- Michael Jai White as Orlando Hudson
- Christopher Lloyd as Lloyd Mickey
- Alaina Warren Zachary as Mrs. Alarie

== Release ==
=== Reception ===
Kimber Myers from the Los Angeles Times called the film "a cheap Nevada Barr knockoff that lacks suspense, or a dusty paperback thriller you'd find at a rest stop." Matthew Pejkovic writing for "Matt's Movie Reviews" gave the film 3 out of 5 stars, stating: "Featuring a dynamic central performance from Michael Jai White, Making a Killing is a true crime story that has the characters and plot that will suck you into its stranger than fiction tale." Rich Cline from the "Shadows on the Wall" gave the movie 4 out of 5 stars and said: "Each of the characters bristles with life, making their conversations edgy and unpredictable. The actors have a great time playing with the detailed characterisations."
