= Mike Starr (actor) =

American actor

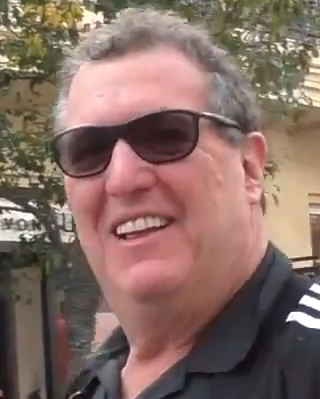
- Starr in 2016
- Born: July 29, 1950 (age 76); Queens, New York, U.S.
- Occupation: Actor
- Years active: 1978–present
- Relatives: Beau Starr

Mike Starr (born July 29, 1950) is an American character actor. Tall and burly with a deep voice, Starr often performs as mobsters, police officers, blue-collar workers or tough guys. He was a regular cast member on The Young and the Restless and Ed, and has appeared in the films Goodfellas, Dumb and Dumber and Billy Bathgate.

== Early life ==
Michael Starr was born in Queens, New York, and grew up in Flushing. He is of Irish and Polish descent. His brother was actor Beau Starr.

== Career ==
Starr has featured in notable films such as Goodfellas, Uncle Buck, The Bodyguard, Ed Wood, Miller's Crossing, Jersey Girl, Cabin Boy, Dumb and Dumber, The Last Dragon and The Ice Harvest.

== Filmography ==
=== Films ===
Year	Title	Role	Notes
1979	Squeeze Play!	Salon Proprietor	
1979	The Bushido Blade	Chief Petty Officer "Cave" Johnson	
1980	Cruising	Patrolman Dasher	
1984	The Natural	Boone	
1985	The Last Dragon	Rock	
1985	Cat's Eye	Ducky	
1985	The Protector	Hood	
1985	Love, Long Distance	Stan Cummings	
1986	The Money Pit	Lenny	
1986	Violets Are Blue	Tony	
1986	Off Beat	James Bonnell	
1986	King Kong Lives	Cell Guard	
1987	Radio Days	Burglar	
1987	Magic Sticks	Debt Collector	
1987	Who's That Girl	Shipping Co-Worker	
1987	Five Corners	Bartender	
1987	The Avenger	Hackett	
1988	Hot Paint	N/A	
1988	Frank Nitti: The Enforcer	Sergeant Harry Lang	
1988	Funny Farm	Crocker	
1988	The Appointments of Dennis Jennings	Doorman	
1988	Punchline	Man with Bullhorn	
1988	The Chair	Wilson	
1989	White Hot	Chauffeur	
1989	New York Stories	Hardhat	
1989	Lean on Me	Mr. Zirella	
1989	Collision Course	Auto Worker	
1989	Last Exit to Brooklyn	Security Guard	
1989	Uncle Buck	Pooter the Clown	
1989	Prime Target	Groucho	
1989	Kojak: Fatal Flaw	Hamilton	
1989	Born on the Fourth of July	Man in Bar	
1989	Kojak: Ariana	Hamilton	
1990	Blue Steel	Superintendent	
1990	A Shock to the System	Homeless Man	
1990	Goodfellas	Frenchy	
1990	Miller's Crossing	Frankie	
1990	Kojak: Flowers for Matty	Hamilton	
1991	The 10 Million Dollar Getaway	Robert "Frenchy" McMahon	
1991	Billy Bathgate	Julie Martin	
1992	Freejack	Shaggy Man	
1992	Mac	Fireman	
1992	The Bodyguard	Tony Scipelli	
1993	Mad Dog and Glory	Harold	
1993	Night Trap	Detective Williams	
1993	Son of the Pink Panther	Hanif	
1993	Me and Veronica	Vinnie	
1993	Down on the Waterfront	Rodney	
1994	Cabin Boy	Mulligan	
1994	The Hudsucker Proxy	Newsroom Reporter	
1994	On Deadly Ground	Big Mike	
1994	Blown Away	Francis the Barkeeper	
1994	Baby's Day Out	Jojo Ducky	
1994	Trial by Jury	Hughie Bonner	
1994	Ed Wood	George Weiss	
1994	Dumb and Dumber	Joe Mentalino	
1995	The Shamrock Conspiracy	Tierney	
1995	A Pyromaniac's Love Story	Sgt. Zikowski	
1995	Pins and Needles	Arnold Swanson	
1995	Clockers	Thumper	
1996	Flipping	C.J / Fat Dude	
1996	Two If by Sea	Fitzie	
1996	James and the Giant Peach	Cop	
1996	Blood and Wine	Mike	
1996	Just Your Luck	Carl	
1996	Dear Diary	Fritz	
1997	Path to Paradise: The Untold Story of the World Trade Center Bombing	Mahmud Abouhalima	
1997	Hoodlum	Albert Salke	
1997	The Deli	Johnny	
1997	Lesser Prophets	Larry	
1997	A River Made to Drown In	Frank	
1997	Cusp	Stalker	
1998	Animals with the Tollkeeper	Young Felipe	
1998	Frogs for Snakes	Crunch Gwiazda	
1998	Snake Eyes	Walt McGahn	
1998	The Adventures of Ragtime	Detective Lamaster	
1999	Taxman	Mike Neals	
1999	Murder in a Small Town	Tony	
1999	Gloria	Sean	
1999	Summer of Sam	Eddie	
1999	The Lady in Question	Detective Tony Rossini	
1999	New Jersey Turnpikes	N/A	
2000	The Cactus Kid	Di Pasquale	
2001	3 A.M.	Theo	
2001	Monkeybone	Bull the Minotaur (uncredited)	
2001	Tempted	Dot Collins	
2001	Knockaround Guys	Bobby Boulevard	
2001	The Next Big Thing	Walter Sznitken	
2001	Backflash	Tono	
2003	Anne B. Real	Janitor	
2004	Jersey Girl	Block	
2004	Mickey	Tony	
2004	Elvis Has Left the Building	Sal	
2004	Under the City	Ed Dandos	
2005	Jane Doe: The Wrong Face	Kramer	
2005	The Ice Harvest	Roy Gelles	
2006	Jesse Stone: Night Passage	Lou Carson	
2006	Hot Tamale	Al	
2006	The Black Dahlia	Detective Russ Millard	
2008	Dough Boys	Anthony	
2008	Lone Rider	Lloyd	
2008	Osso Bucco	Jelly Dinotto	
2008	Black Crescent Moon	Leroy Brown	
2009	Lonely Street	JG	
2009	Black Dynamite	Rafelli	
2009	I Hate Valentine's Day	John	
2009	Chicago Overcoat	Lorenzo Galante	
2009	Wrong Turn at Tahoe	Paulie	
2010	Cash	Melvin Goldberg	
2010	The Payoff	Mr. Sweet	
2011	Kill the Irishman	Leo "Lips" Moceri	
2011	Walk a Mile in My Pradas	John	
2011	Jeremy Fink and the Meaning of Life	Officer Polansky	
2012	BuzzKill	Agent Brady	
2012	Mancation	Mr. Vanderplatt	
2012	Delivering the Goods	Domenico	
2013	Buddies	N/A	
2013	Ketchup and A Camera	Russian Interviewer	
2015	Bereave	George	
2015	The Girl Is in Trouble	Fixer	
2015	Welcome to Forever	Roy Molnar	
2015	The Wannabe	Jerry	
2015	Dancer and the Dame	Poochareli	
2016	The Bronx Bull	Jerry	
2016	Bad Santa 2	Jolly Santa	
2016	First Jerk On Mars	Dad	
2016	Small Fish	Barry	
2016	The Girl in the Pink Motel	Captain Peter Shaw	Short
2017	Wiretap Scars	The Chief	Short
2017	Man With Van	Bennett	
2017	Highly Functional	Ronnie Cruz	
2017	Prism	Jim	Segment: Changeless
2017	Deadbeat	Mickey	Short
2018	ThE F3aR	Nick	
2018	Making a Killing	Arthur Herring	
2018	Cabaret Maxime	Ripa	
2019	Offstage Elements	Sammy Gallo	
2019	Recovery	Dr. Taylor	
2019	Zeroville	Burly	
2021	The Cleaner	Carl	
2021	Outcry	Neil	Short
2022	Clowning	Detective Welles	
2022	Life's Better Protected	The Casting Director	Short
2022	Desert Dick	Richard Farnsworth III	
2023	Sweetwater	Eddie Gottlieb	

=== Television ===
Year	Title	Role	Notes
1978	Hawaii Five-O	Max	Episode: "Small Potatoes"
1984	Young People's Specials	Driver	Episode: "Nicky and the Nerd"³
1986	Spenser: For Hire	Mike Stratus	Episode: "A Day's Wages"
1987	Crime Story	Al Vicente	Episode: "The Kingdom of Money"
1988	The Tracey Ullman Show	Episode: "Rude Dinner Patron"	1 Episode
1989	The Equalizer	Garrick	Episode: "The Visitation"
1989	A Man Called Hawk	N/A	Episode: "Passing the Bar"
1989	Wiseguy	Al Merullo	1 Episode
1989	Tattingers	N/A	Episode: "Ex-Appeal"
1990–1995	Law & Order	Various roles	3 Episodes
1992	The Specialists		Voice
1992	Lifestories: Families in Crisis	Richie	Episode: "Blood Brothers: The Joey DiPaolo Story"
1993	Bob	Mert Zucker	Episode: "Neighborhood Watch"
1994	The John Larroquette Show	David Coltrane	Episode: "A Dark and Stormy Night"
1994	Ghostwriter	Big Ralph	Episode: "What's Up with Alex?"
1994	Frasier	Billy Kriezel	Episode: "Seat of Power"
1994	Hardball	Mike Widmer	9 Episodes
1995	Chicago Hope	Mugger	Episode: "Small Sacrifices"
1995	Nowhere Man	Bert Williams	Episode: "The Incredible Derek"
1995	Brotherly Love	Gus	Episode: "Such a Bargain"
1995	NewsRadio	Building Super	Episode: "Rat Funeral"
1996–1997	EZ Streets	Mickey Kinnear	12 Episodes
1996	Deadly Games	Roy Hopkins	Episode: The Trash Man
1996	High Incident	N/A	Pilot
1996	3rd Rock from the Sun	Frank Muller	Episode: "Angry Dick"
1997	Home Improvement	Officer Hill	Episode: "The Flirting Game"
1997	Early Edition	Phil DeLuca	Episode: "The Jury"
1997	The Pretender	Axe	Episode: "Baby Love"
1997	Millennium	Henry Dion	Episode: "Paper Dove"
1997	Grace Under Fire	Engborg	Episode: "Grace Under Construction"
1997	Players	Twitch	Episode: "Three of a Con"
1997	The Last Don	Big Tim	1 Episode
1998–1999	Martial Law	Detective Alex Portman	2 Episodes
1998	L.A. Doctors	Pete Mosely	Episode: "Maybe It's You"
1999	Star Trek: Deep Space Nine	Tony Cicci	Episode: "Badda-Bing Badda-Bang"
1999	Brother's Keeper	Rick	Episode: "The New Client"
2000–2002	Ed	Kenny Sandusky	45 Episodes
2000	Falcone	Bernard Fitzroy	2 Episodes
2000	The West Wing	Senator Tony Marino	Episode: "The Lame Duck Congress"
2003	Law & Order: Criminal Intent	Detective Ted Marston	Episode: "Monster"
2003	A.U.S.A.	Bobby Paterno	Episode: "Sullivan, Rakoff, & Associate
2003	Without a Trace	Gil	Episode: "No Mas"
2003	Karen Sisco	Louis	Episode: "Dumb Bunnies"
2003	The Handler	Artie Levy	Episode: "Bruno Comes Back"
2004–2005	Joan of Arcadia	Big Tough Guy God	4 Episodes
2004	Scrubs	Mr. Iverson	Episode: "My Rule of Thumb"
2005	Listen Up	Bully	Episode: "Tony the Tiger"
2005	NCIS	Monroe Cooper	Episode: "Black Water"
2005	House	Willie	Episode: "DNR"
2005	CSI: NY	Chief Vince Robinson	Episode: "The Dove Commission"
2006	Stacked	Victor	Episode: "Poker"
2008	Wainy Days	Cabbie	Episode: "Nan and Lucy"
2008	The Middleman	Cop	1 Episode
2008	Life on Mars	Nelson	Episode: "Out Here in the Fields"
2009	The Office	Angelo Grotti	Episode: "Mafia"
2010	The Life & Times of Tim	Angry Bar Guy	1 Episode
2010	The Good Guys	Bobby Kneecaps	Episode: "Silvio's Way"
2010	Days of Our Lives	George	5 Episodes
2010	Law & Order: Special Victims Unit	Mike O'Doole	Episode: "Rescue"
2011–2012	The Young and the Restless	Angelo	30 Episodes
2011	Glee	Usher	Episode: "New York"
2011	Childrens Hospital	Taxi Driver	1 Episode
2012–2013	The Mob Doctor	Al Trapani	4 Episodes
2012	Best Friends Forever	Angelo	1 Episode
2012	The Finder	Benny Famosa	Episode: "Voodoo Undo"
2012	CSI: Crime Scene Investigation	Dominic Bruno	Episode: "Homecoming"
2013	Psych	Max Rizzo	Season 7, Episode 7
2013	Elementary	Russell Gertz	Episode: "Ancient History"
2013	Chicago Fire	Arthur	5 Episodes
2015	Kroll Show	Bobby's Father	Episode: "Body Bouncers"
2015	Bones	Frankie Cooper	Episode: "The Big Beef at the Royal Diner"
2015	Public Morals	Snowflakes	3 episodes
2015	Bilbainadas	Networks CEO	Episode: "SuperCampeones. Parte 1"
2016	Unbreakable Kimmy Schmidt	Dominic	Episode: "Kimmy Goes to Her Happy Place"
2017	Billions	Nicky Pawlowski	Episode: "Currency"
2017	Dice	Harold	Episode: "No Bullsh*t"
2018	Mr. Mercedes	Library Al	7 episodes
2019	Adam Ruins Everything	Butcher	Episode: "Adam Ruins a Plate of Nachos"
2019	Ray Donovan	O'Malley	Season 7 "Episode: "An Irish Lullaby"
2020	Shameless	Yard Guy	Episode: "Location, Location, Location"
2021	The Blacklist	Balthazar 'Bino' Baker	Episode: "Balthazar 'Bino' Baker (N0. 129)"
2022–2023	East New York	Kurt Walsh	2 episodes
