= The Lady in Question (1999 film) =

1999 American television film

- Magazine advertisement
- Genre: Period mystery; Crime thriller
- Written by: Gene Wilder; Gilbert Pearlman
- Directed by: Joyce Chopra
- Starring: Gene Wilder; Mike Starr; Cherry Jones; Barbara Sukowa; John Benjamin Hickey; Michael Cumpsty; Claire Bloom
- Music by: John Morris
- Country of origin: United States
- Original language: English

Production
- Executive producers: Delia Fine; Antony Root
- Producers: Stan Margulies; Craig McNeil; Steven Paul
- Production location: Toronto
- Cinematography: Bruce Surtees
- Editor: Angelo Corrao
- Running time: 100 minutes
- Production companies: Crystal Sky Worldwide; Granada Entertainment; The Stan Margolies Company

Original release
- Network: A&E
- Release: December 12, 1999

Related
- Murder in a Small Town

The Lady in Question is a 1999 American television mystery crime-thriller film directed by Joyce Chopra. It represents the last leading role and film for Gene Wilder and his last credit as screenwriter. As in the previous film Murder in a Small Town, Wilder plays the amateur detective Larry "Cash" Carter. It was broadcast by A&E on December 12, 1999.

== Cast ==
- Gene Wilder as Larry "Cash" Carter
- Mike Starr as Det. Tony Rossini
- Cherry Jones as Mimi Barnes
- Barbara Sukowa as Rachel Singer
- John Benjamin Hickey as Paul Kessler
- Claire Bloom as Emma Sachs
- Michael Cumpsty as Klaus Gruber
- Dixie Seatle as Gertie Moser

== Production ==
After the high ratings A&E received for Murder in a Small Town, the first Cash Carter mystery, The Lady in Question began filming in Toronto in May 1999.

Although A&E and Granada Entertainment USA planned to develop the Gene Wilder character as a franchise, only two Cash Carter films were produced. On January 30, 2000, Wilder was admitted to Memorial Sloan–Kettering Cancer Center for a stem-cell transplant, a follow-up to treatment he received in 1999 for non-Hodgkin lymphoma. Wilder checked in under the name Larry Carter, his character's name in the two A&E films.

== Home video releases ==
- 1999, A&E Home Video, VHS (AAE-17606), ISBN 0-7670-2316-1
- 2002, A&E Home Video, DVD (AAE-72223), ISBN 0-7670-6956-0
