= Cherry Jones =

American actress (born 1956)

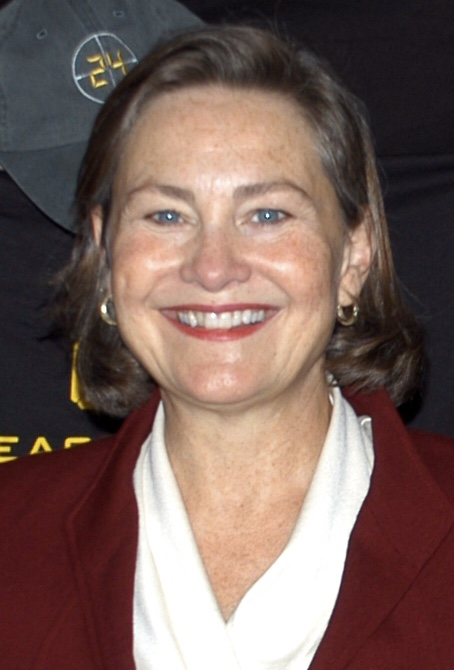
- Jones in 2009
- Born: November 21, 1956 (age 69); Paris, Tennessee, U.S.
- Education: Carnegie Mellon University (BFA)
- Occupation: Actress
- Years active: 1980–present
- Spouse: Sophie Huber (m. 2015)
- Partner(s): Mary O'Connor (1986–2004); Sarah Paulson (2004–2009)
- Awards: Full list

Cherry Jones (born November 21, 1956) is an American actress. She started her career in theater as a founding member of the American Repertory Theater in 1980 before transitioning into film and television. Celebrated for her dynamic roles on stage and screen, she has received various accolades, including three Primetime Emmy Awards and two Tony Awards, as well as nominations for an Olivier Award and a Screen Actors Guild Award.

Jones made her Broadway debut in the 1987 play Stepping Out. She went on to receive two Tony Awards for Best Actress in a Play for The Heiress in 1995 and Doubt in 2005. Her other Tony-nominated roles were in Our Country's Good in 1991, A Moon for the Misbegotten in 2000, and The Glass Menagerie in 2014. Her most recent Broadway performance was in The Lifespan of a Fact in 2018.

She is also known for her work on television with breakthrough roles as Barbara Layton in The West Wing and President Allison Taylor in 24, the latter of which won her the Primetime Emmy Award for Outstanding Supporting Actress in a Drama Series in 2009. She received a Screen Actors Guild Award nomination for Transparent in 2015 and earned two Primetime Emmy Awards Outstanding Guest Actress in a Drama Series for her roles in the Hulu drama series The Handmaid's Tale in 2019 and the HBO drama series Succession in 2020.

Her film appearances include The Horse Whisperer (1998), Erin Brockovich (2000), The Perfect Storm (2000), Signs (2002), The Village (2004), Ocean's Twelve (2004), 24: Redemption (2008), Amelia (2009), The Beaver (2011), A Rainy Day in New York (2019), and The Eyes of Tammy Faye (2021).

== Early life and education ==
Jones was born in Paris, Tennessee. Her mother was a high school teacher, and her father owned a flower shop. Her parents were very supportive of her theatrical ambitions, encouraging her interest by sending her to classes with local drama teacher Ruby Krider. Jones takes great pains to credit her high school speech teacher, Linda Wilson, with her first real preparatory work. She is a 1978 graduate of the Carnegie Mellon School of Drama. While at CMU, she was one of the earliest actors to work at City Theatre, a fixture of Pittsburgh theatre.

== Career ==
Most of her career has been in theatre, beginning in 1980 as a founding member of the American Repertory Theater in Cambridge, Massachusetts.

Her Broadway performances include Lincoln Center's 1995 production of The Heiress and also a 2005 production of John Patrick Shanley's play Doubt at the Walter Kerr Theatre. For both roles, she earned a Tony Award for Best Leading Actress in a Play.

Other Broadway credits include Nora Ephron's play Imaginary Friends (with Swoosie Kurtz), the 2000 revival of A Moon for the Misbegotten, and Timberlake Wertenbaker's Our Country's Good, for which she earned her first Tony nomination. She is considered to be one of the foremost theater actresses in the United States. In 1994, she also appeared in the Broadway run of Angels in America: Millennium Approaches and Perestroika as the Angel, replacing Ellen McLaughlin, who had originated the role.

She has narrated the audiobook adaptations of Laura Ingalls Wilder's Little House series including, Little House in the Big Woods, Little House on the Prairie, Farmer Boy, On the Banks of Plum Creek, By the Shores of Silver Lake, The Long Winter, and Little Town on the Prairie. In recent years, Jones has ventured into feature films. Her screen credits include Cradle Will Rock, The Perfect Storm, Signs, Ocean's Twelve, and The Village.

Jones played President Taylor on the Fox series 24, a role for which she won an Emmy for Outstanding Supporting Actress in a Drama Series. She played the role in the seventh season, from January to May 2009, as well as eighth season, which aired from January to May 2010.

In 2012, Jones starred in the NBC drama series Awake as psychiatrist Dr. Judith Evans.

Also in 2012, she portrayed Amanda Wingfield in the Loeb Drama Center's revival of Tennessee Williams' The Glass Menagerie alongside Zachary Quinto, Brian J. Smith and Celia Keenan-Bolger.

In 2014, Cherry Jones was inducted into the American Theater Hall of Fame.

In 2015 and 2016 Jones had a recurring role on the Primetime Emmy Award-winning Amazon comedy-drama series Transparent in its second and third seasons. She was nominated for the Critics' Choice Television Award for Best Guest Performer in a Comedy Series for her work in the 2015 season.

In 2016, she appeared in "Nosedive", an episode of the anthology series Black Mirror.

In 2018, Jones played Holly, the feminist mother to June/Offred in The Handmaid's Tale. She won an Emmy for her performance.

In 2019, Jones played the role of a grouchy psychic and tarot card reader in the comedy Wine Country, directed by Amy Poehler.

== Personal life ==
In 1995, when Jones accepted her first Tony Award, she thanked Mary O'Connor, with whom she had an 18-year relationship.

She started dating Sarah Paulson in 2004. When she accepted her Best Actress Tony in 2005 for her work in Doubt, she thanked "Laura Wingfield", the Glass Menagerie character being played in the Broadway revival by Paulson. In 2007, Paulson and Jones declared their love for each other in an interview with Velvetpark at Women's Event 10 for the LGBTQ Center of New York. Paulson and Jones ended their relationship amicably in 2009.

In mid-2015, Jones married filmmaker Sophie Huber.

Jones is a staunch defender of Woody Allen, in whose 2019 film A Rainy Day in New York she had a role. In April 2019, she said: "[...] I went back and studied every scrap of information I could get about that period. And in my heart of hearts, I do not believe he was guilty as charged [...] [t]here are those who are comfortable with their certainty. I am not. I don't know the truth, but I know that if we condemn by instinct, democracy is on a slippery slope."

== Acting credits ==
=== Film ===
| Year | Title | Role | Notes |
|---|---|---|---|
| 1987 | Light of Day | Cindy Montgomery | |
| 1987 | The Big Town | Ginger McDonald | |
| 1992 | Housesitter | Patty | |
| 1995 | Polio Water | Virginia | Short film |
| 1997 | Julian Po | Lucy | |
| 1998 | The Horse Whisperer | Liz Hammond | |
| 1998 | Out of the Past | Annie Adams Fields | Documentary |
| 1999 | Cradle Will Rock | Hallie Flanagan | |
| 2000 | Erin Brockovich | Pamela Duncan | |
| 2000 | The Perfect Storm | Edie Bailey | |
| 2002 | Divine Secrets of the Ya-Ya Sisterhood | Buggy Abbott | |
| 2002 | Signs | Officer Paski | |
| 2004 | The Village | Mrs. Clack | |
| 2004 | Ocean's Twelve | Molly Star/Mrs. Caldwell | |
| 2005 | Swimmers | Julia Tyler | |
| 2009 | Amelia | Eleanor Roosevelt | |
| 2009 | Mother and Child | Sister Joanne | |
| 2011 | The Beaver | Vice President | |
| 2011 | New Year's Eve | Mrs. Rose Ahern | |
| 2013 | Days and Nights | Mary | |
| 2015 | Knight of Cups | Ruth | |
| 2015 | I Saw the Light | Lillie Williams | |
| 2016 | Whiskey Tango Foxtrot | Geri Taub | |
| 2017 | The Party | Martha | |
| 2018 | Boy Erased | Dr. Muldoon | |
| 2019 | Wine Country | Lady Sunshine | |
| 2019 | A Rainy Day in New York | Mrs. Welles | |
| 2019 | Motherless Brooklyn | Gabby Horowitz | |
| 2019 | Our Friend | Faith Pruett | |
| 2021 | The Eyes of Tammy Faye | Rachel LaValley | |
| 2022 | The Sky Is Everywhere | Gram Walker | |
| TBA | The Steel Harp | TBA | Post-production |
| TBA | Fonda | TBA | Filming |

=== Television ===
| Year | Title | Role | Notes |
|---|---|---|---|
| 1986 | Alex: The Life of a Child | Tina Crawford | Television film |
| 1987 | Spenser: For Hire | Tracy Kincaid | Episode: "Sleepless Dream" |
| 1992 | Loving | Frankie | Unknown episodes |
| 1993 | TriBeCa | Tough Woman | Episode: "The Loft" |
| 1999 | Murder in a Small Town | Mimi Barnes | Television film |
| 1999 | The Lady in Question | Mimi Barnes | Television film |
| 2000 | Cora Unashamed | Lizbeth Studevant | Television film |
| 2001 | What Makes a Family | Sandy Cataldi | Television film |
| 2001 | Frasier | Janet | Episode: "Junior Agent" |
| 2002 | American Experience | Narrator | Episode: "Miss America" |
| 2004 | The West Wing | Barbara Layton | Episode: "Eppur Si Muove" |
| 2004–2005 | Clubhouse | Sister Marie | 3 episodes |
| 2008 | 24: Redemption | President-Elect Allison Taylor | Television film |
| 2009–2010 | 24 | President Allison Taylor | Main role (season 7–8); 44 episodes |
| 2012 | Awake | Dr. Judith Evans | 11 episodes |
| 2015–2019 | Transparent | Leslie Mackinaw | 12 episodes |
| 2016 | Mercy Street | Dorothea Dix | 2 episodes |
| 2016 | 11.22.63 | Marguerite Oswald | 5 episodes |
| 2016 | Black Mirror | Susan | Episode: "Nosedive" |
| 2017 | American Crime | Laurie Ann Hesby | 4 episodes |
| 2018 | Portlandia | Ms. Mayor | Episode: "Rose Route" |
| 2018–2025 | The Handmaid's Tale | Holly Maddox | 5 episodes |
| 2019 | Chimerica | Mel Kincaid | 4 episodes |
| 2019–2023 | Succession | Nan Pierce | 3 episodes |
| 2020 | Defending Jacob | Joanna Klein | 8 episodes |
| 2020 | Close Enough | (voice) | Episode: "Robot Tutor/Golden Gamer" |
| 2022 | Five Days at Memorial | Susan Mulderick | 7 episodes |
| 2023–2024 | Velma | Victoria Jones (voice) | 11 episodes |
| 2023 | Poker Face | Laura | Episode: "The Orpheus Syndrome" |
| 2023 | Extrapolations | President Elizabeth Burdick | Episode: "2059: Face of God" |
| 2025 | Foundation | Ambassador Quent | Season 3 |
| 2026 | Hacks | Kelly Kilpatrick | Episode: "Montecito" |

=== Theater ===
| Year | Title | Role | Venue |
|---|---|---|---|
| 1983 | The Philanthropist | Liz | |
| 1984 | The Ballad of Soapy Smith | Kitty Chase | |
| 1985–1996 | The Importance of Being Earnest | Cecily Cardew | |
| 1987 | Claptrap | Sarah Littlefield | |
| 1987 | Stepping Out | Lynne | |
| 1987 | Tartuffe | Dorine | Portland Stage Company (Maine) |
| 1988 | Macbeth | Lady Macduff | |
| 1991 | Our Country's Good | Reverend Johnson/Liz Morden | |
| 1991 | Light Shining in Buckinghamshire | —N/a | |
| 1992 | The Baltimore Waltz | Anna | |
| 1992 | Good Night Desdemona (Good Morning Juliet) | Constance Ledbelly | |
| 1993–1994 | Angels in America: Millennium Approaches | Various replacements | Walter Kerr Theatre, Broadway |
| 1993–1994 | Angels in America: Perestroika | Various replacements | Walter Kerr Theatre, Broadway |
| 1993 | And Baby Makes Seven | Anna | |
| 1993 | Desdemona | Bianca | |
| 1995 | The Heiress | Catherine Sloper | Cort Theatre, Broadway |
| 1996 | The Night of the Iguana | Hannah Jelkes | Roundabout Theatre Company |
| 1997–1998 | Pride's Crossing | Mabel Tidings/Bigelow | Lincoln Center |
| 1999 | Tongue of a Bird | Maxine | The Public Theater |
| 2000 | A Moon for the Misbegotten | Josie Hogan | Walter Kerr Theatre, Broadway |
| 2001 | Major Barbara | Barbara Undershaft | American Airlines Theatre, Broadway |
| 2002–2003 | Imaginary Friends | Mary McCarthy | Ethel Barrymore Theatre, Broadway |
| 2003 | Flesh and Blood | Mary Stassos | New York Theatre Workshop |
| 2005–2006 | Doubt | Sister Aloysius | Walter Kerr Theatre, Broadway |
| 2006 | Faith Healer | Grace | Booth Theatre, Broadway |
| 2010 | Mrs. Warren's Profession | Mrs. Kitty Warren | American Airlines Theatre, Broadway |
| 2013–2014 | The Glass Menagerie | Amanda Wingfield | Booth Theatre, Broadway |
| 2014 | When We Were Young and Unafraid | Agnes | Manhattan Theatre Club |
| 2017 | The Glass Menagerie | Amanda Wingfield | Duke of York's Theatre, West End |
| 2018 | The Lifespan of a Fact | Emily | Studio 54, Broadway |
| 2024 | The Grapes of Wrath | Ma Joad | Lyttleton Theatre, London |
