= Critics' Choice Television Award for Best Guest Performer in a Comedy Series =

The Critics' Choice Television Award for Best Guest Performer in a Comedy Series was one of the award categories presented annually by the Critics' Choice Television Awards (BTJA) to recognize the work done by television actors. It was introduced in 2012 and last presented in 2016. The winners were selected by a group of television critics that are part of the Broadcast Television Critics Association.

== Winners and nominees ==
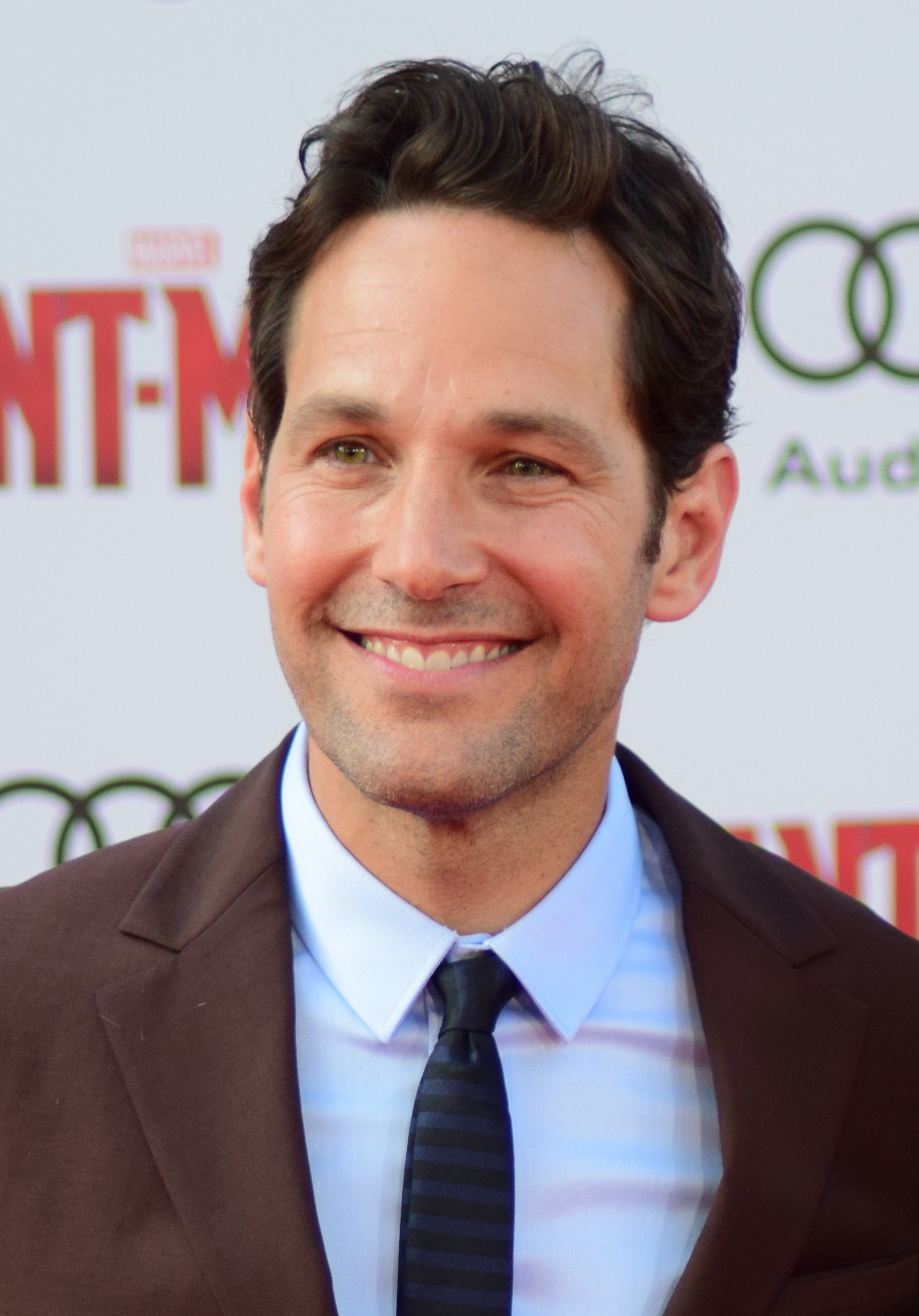
Paul Rudd won for Parks and Recreation (2012)

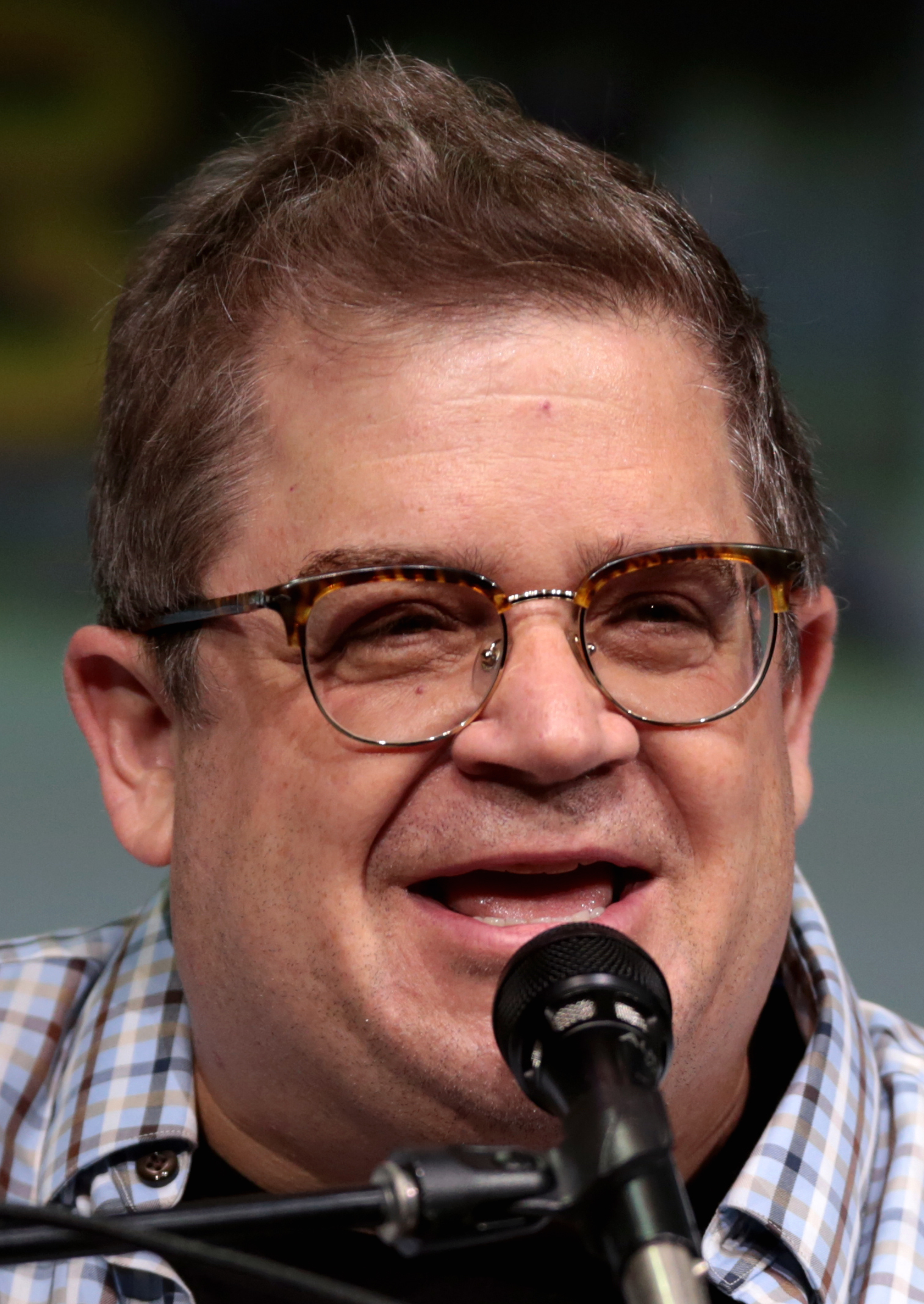
Patton Oswalt won for Parks and Recreation (2013)

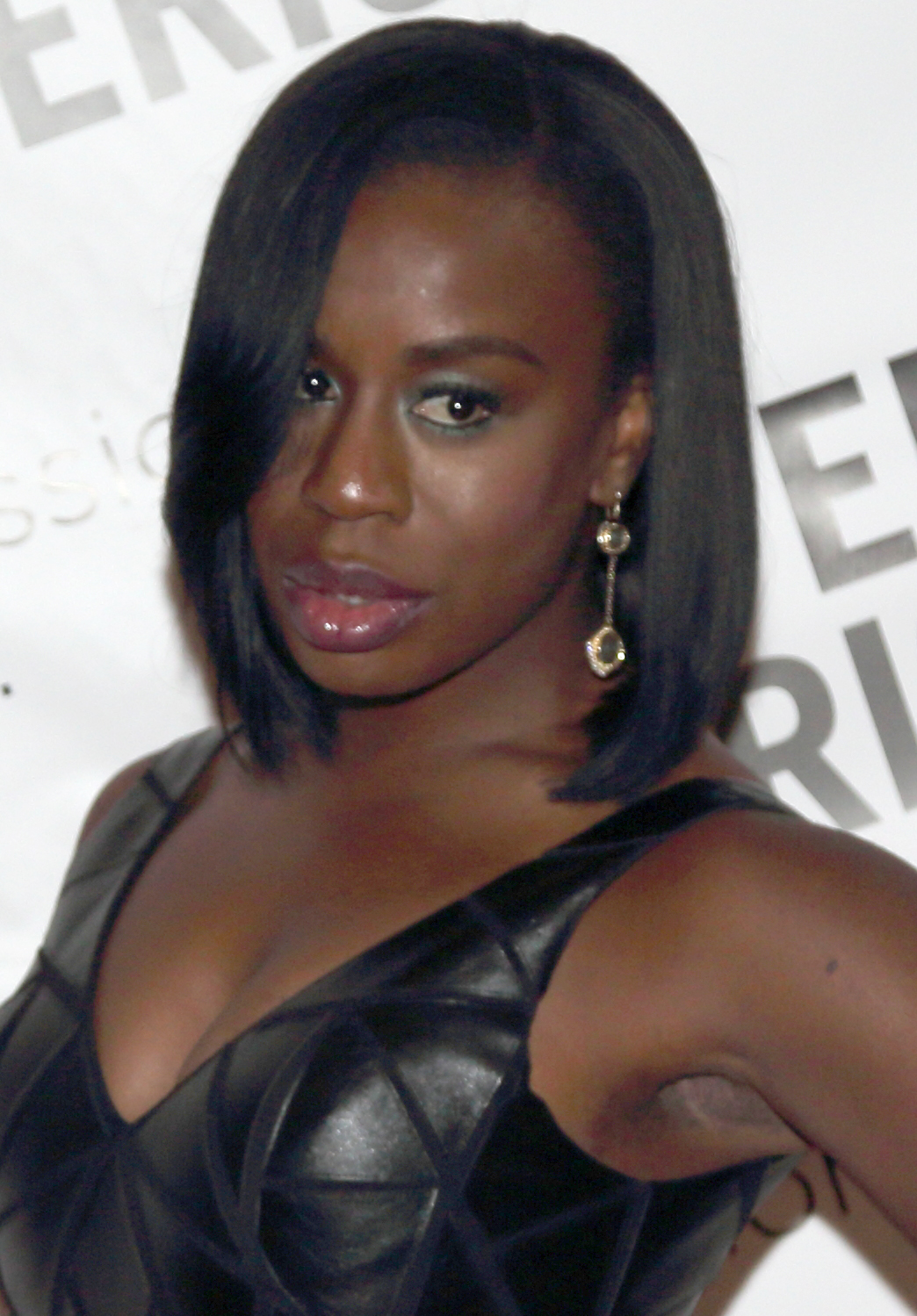
Uzo Aduba won for Orange is the New Black (2014)

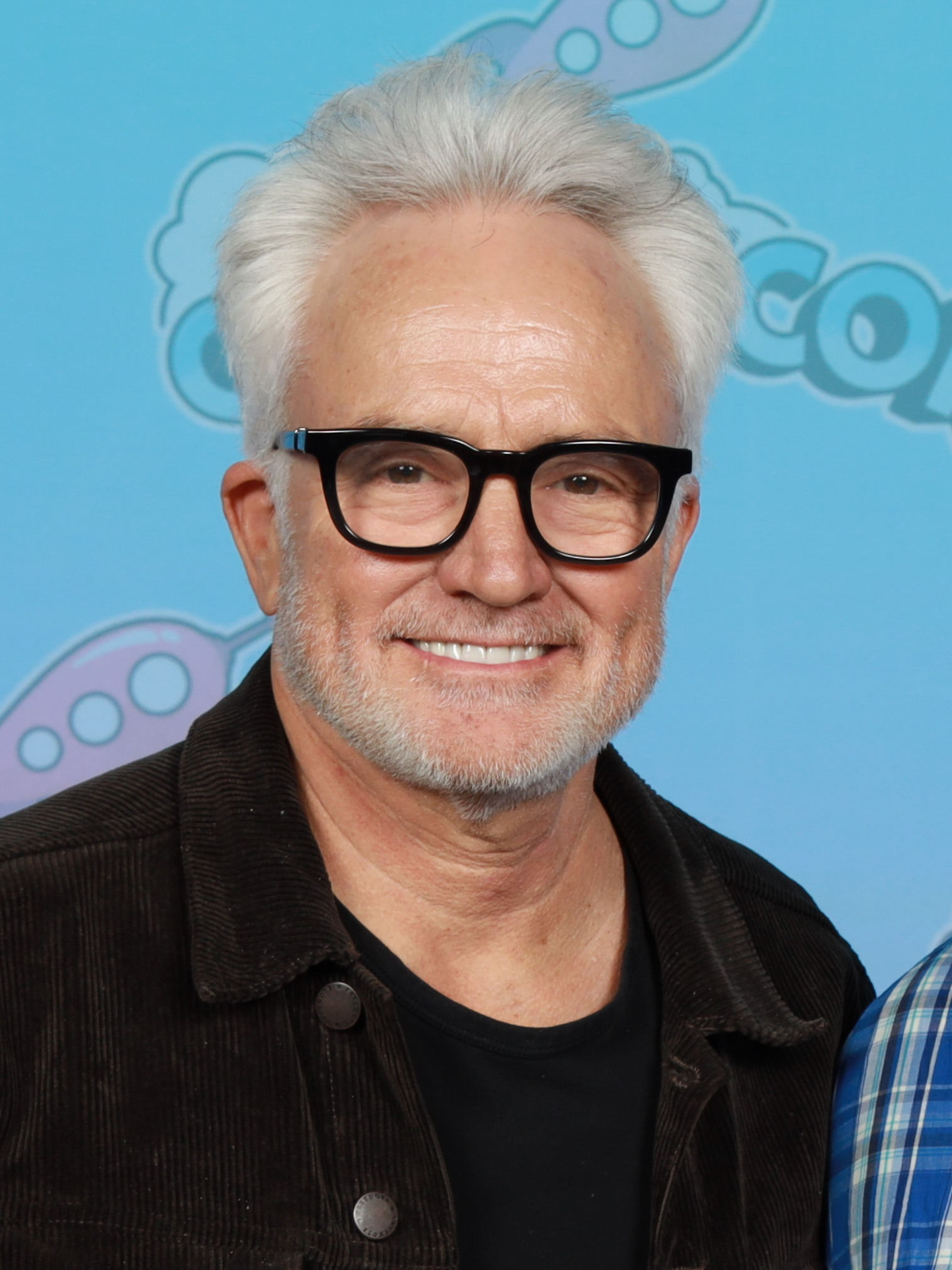
Bradley Whitford won for Transparent (2015)

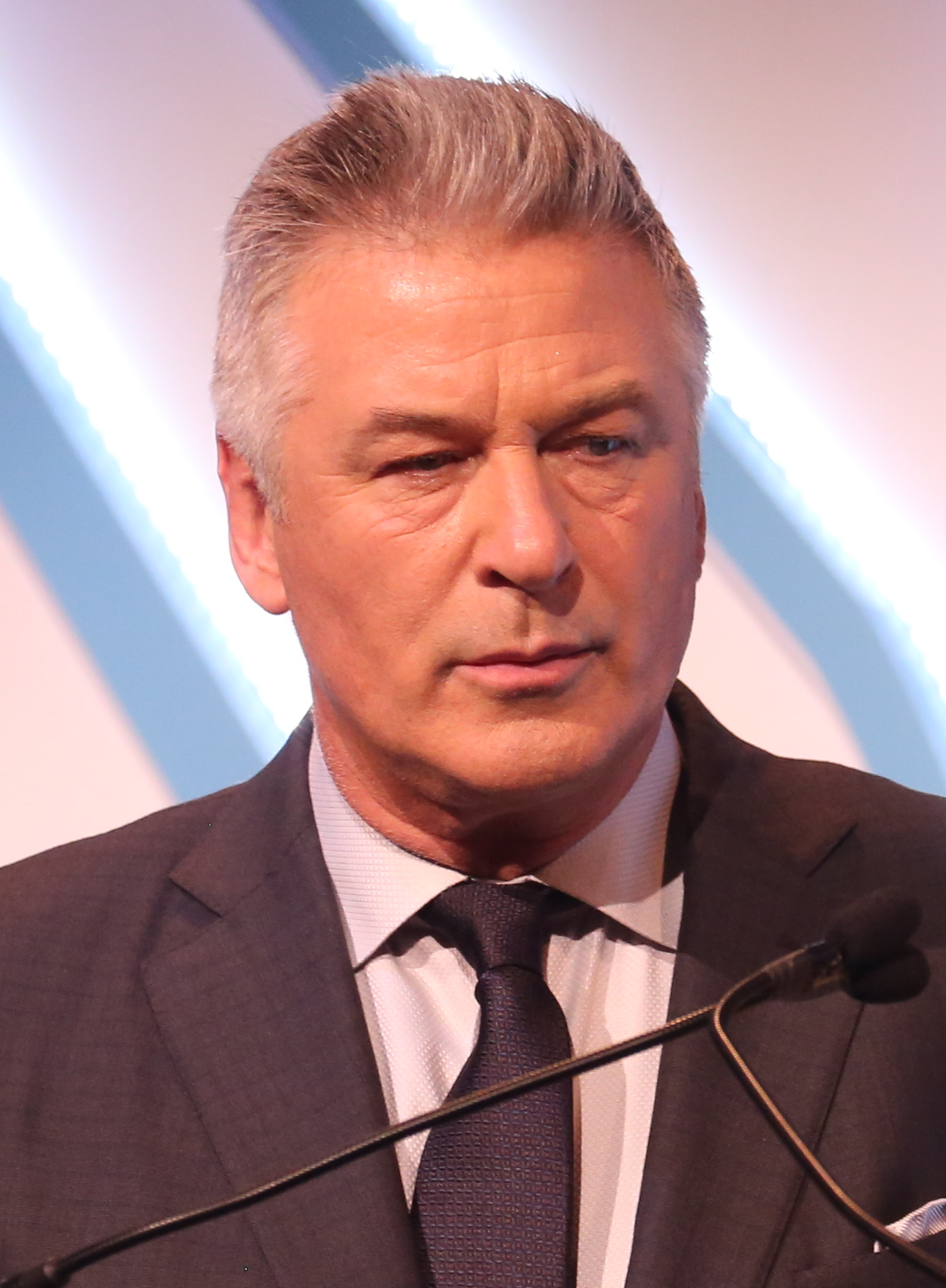
Alec Baldwin won for Saturday Night Live (2016)

indicates the winner

=== 2010s ===
Year	Actor	Role	Program	Network
2012	Paul Rudd	Parks and Recreation	Bobby Newport	NBC
2012	Becky Ann Baker	Girls	Loreen Horvath	HBO
2012	Bobby Cannavale	Modern Family	Lewis	ABC
2012	Kathryn Hahn	Parks and Recreation	Jennifer Barkley	NBC
2012	Justin Long	New Girl	Paul Genzlinger	Fox
2012	Peter Scolari	Girls	Tad Horvath	HBO
2013	Patton Oswalt	Parks and Recreation	Garth Blundin	NBC
2013	Melissa Leo	Louie	Laurie Brent	FX
2013	David Lynch	Louie	Jack Dall	FX
2013	Bob Newhart	The Big Bang Theory	Professor Proton / Arthur Jeffries	CBS
2013	Molly Shannon	Enlightened	Eileen Foliente	HBO
2013	Patrick Wilson	Girls	Joshua	HBO
2014	Uzo Aduba	Orange Is the New Black	Suzanne "Crazy Eyes" Warren	Netflix
2014	Sarah Baker	Louie	Vanessa	FX
2014	James Earl Jones	The Big Bang Theory	Himself	CBS
2014	Mimi Kennedy	Mom	Marjorie Armstrong	CBS
2014	Andrew Rannells	Girls	Elijah Krantz	HBO
2014	Lauren Weedman	Looking	Doris	HBO
2015	Bradley Whitford	Transparent	Marcy May	Amazon Prime Video
2015	Becky Ann Baker	Girls	Loreen Horvath	HBO
2015	Josh Charles	Inside Amy Schumer	Coach	Comedy Central
2015	Susie Essman	Broad City	Bobbi Wexler	Comedy Central
2015	Peter Gallagher	Togetherness	Larry Brown	HBO
2015	Laurie Metcalf	The Big Bang Theory	Mary Cooper	CBS
2016 (1)	Timothy Olyphant	The Grinder	Himself	Fox
2016 (1)	Ellen Burstyn	Mom	Shirley Stabler	CBS
2016 (1)	Anjelica Huston	Transparent	Vicky	Amazon Prime Video
2016 (1)	Cherry Jones	Transparent	Leslie Mackinaw	Amazon Prime Video
2016 (1)	Jenifer Lewis	black-ish	Ruby Johnson	ABC
2016 (1)	John Slattery	Wet Hot American Summer: First Day of Camp	Claude Dumet	Netflix
2016 (2)	Alec Baldwin	Saturday Night Live	Donald Trump	NBC
2016 (2)	Christine Baranski	The Big Bang Theory	Dr. Beverly Hofstadter	CBS
2016 (2)	Larry David	Saturday Night Live	Host / Bernie Sanders / Various Characters	NBC
2016 (2)	Lisa Kudrow	Unbreakable Kimmy Schmidt	Lori-Ann Schmidt	Netflix
2016 (2)	Liam Neeson	Inside Amy Schumer	Himself	Comedy Central

== Multiple nominations ==
2 nominations

- Becky Ann Baker

== See also ==
- Primetime Emmy Award for Outstanding Guest Actor in a Comedy Series
- Primetime Emmy Award for Outstanding Guest Actress in a Comedy Series
