= Spinelli Kilcollin =

American jewelry brand

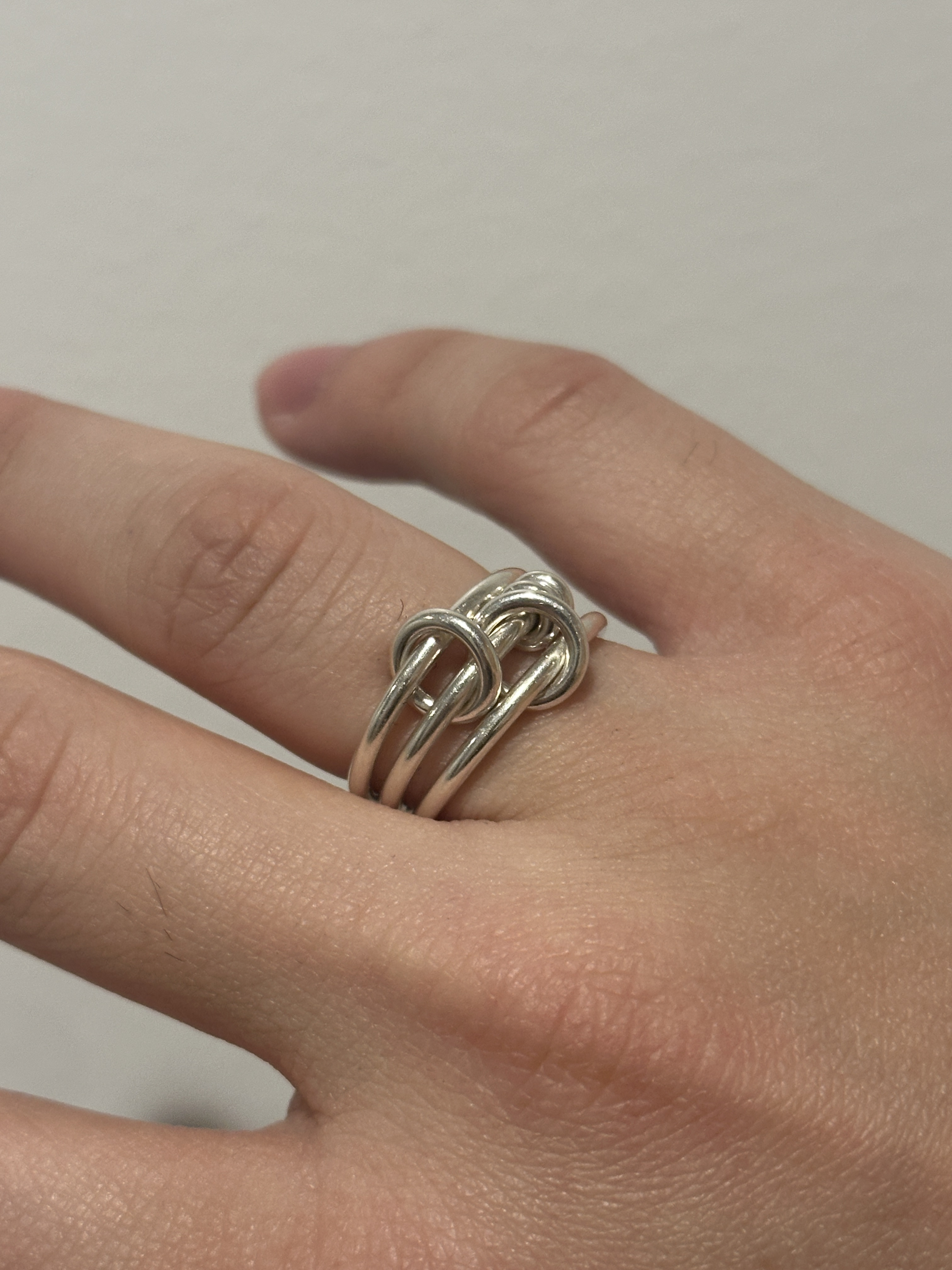
Acacia Ring from Spinelli Kilcollin

Spinelli Kilcollin is an American jewelry brand based in Los Angeles, California. Founded in 2010 by Yves Spinelli and Dwyer Kilcollin, the label is most known for its collection of "Galaxy Rings", a design of interlinked bands connected by jump rings, intended to be worn either stacked on one finger or across multiple fingers. These rings have multiple variations, made of different precious metals and diamonds. The brand's best-selling designs include the Vega SG ring, which combines grey and white diamonds with silver and yellow gold, the Sonny ring in rose gold and the Nexus ring.

All Spinelli Kilcollin pieces are made by a small team of artisans based in downtown Los Angeles. Over the past 15 years, the brand has been noted for its use of mixed metals and diamonds in designs and is favored by some celebrities and designers.

As of 2025, the brand operates two flagship stores in New York City and Los Angeles, while also having presence in luxury and department stores around the world.

== History ==
The brand Spinelli Kilcollin was founded in 2010 in Los Angeles by Yves Spinelli and Dwyer Kilcollin. The pair met while Yves Spinelli was working in Maxfield and Kilcollin was a sculptor and an artist. According to the founders, the early design of the rings drew interest from friends and local clients of Yves Spinelli's. In a 2013 coverage by Vogue, Spinelli recounted how in early days of the brand, its aesthetic was often compared to Ann Demeulemeester's, reflecting its gothic influenced design. The brand was noticed early on by Ikram Goldman, a big supporter of the brand and the owner of Ikram luxury retail store in Chicago, who commissioned many custom orders. It was in particular the Goldman's order that changed the direction of the brand into a more luxury path.

The turning point for the brand came when Ikram Goldman commissioned a ring with all diamond pavé, after which she contacted Sally Singer, the then Creative Director of Vogue, which was described in media as popularizing the pavé style in linked rings. Retailer Elyse Walker was also among the early supporters of the brand, incorporating its rings into her personal wardrobe and introducing them to her clients. By 2014, Spinelli Kilcollin has expanded to be sold at luxury retailers and department stores globally.

The consequent Vogue article in 2014 highlighted brand's success when the "Galaxy" rings became highly sought after among fashion editors with at least ten staff members at Vogue purchasing it. Though the brand was established in 2010, its prominent success came to life only after the implementation of pavé diamonds, that attracted various fashion editor and major retailers, like Barneys. The rings' versatility and distinctive design contributed to their widespread appeal among customers. Vogue Market Editor Selby Drummond describes the rapid growth of Spinelli Kilcollin as a "phenomenon" in the fashion world, commenting that she had never seen such a rapid adoption of a trend.

== Collaborations ==
Since its founding in 2010, Spinelli Kilcollin has had many notable collaborations with other brands and individuals.

- In 2018, the brand partnered with Emily Ratajkowski, a model and an actress, to create a collection of rings, where both sides partnered up to co-design it. For the collection design, Emily used one of her vintage rings as a reference point, which gave a personal and nostalgic aesthetic while maintaining Spinelli Kilcollin's signature linked-ring style.
- In 2019, Spinelli Kilcollin joined hands with the fine jewelry brand, Hoorsenbuhs to create a capsule collection, named "333". The collection features three ring silhouettes in three different materials. The materials include sterling silver, yellow gold and pavé. The rings integrate Hoorsenbuhs's tri-link motif and Spinelli's signature linked ring.
- As an extension of its product type, Spinelli Kilcollin teamed up with Barton Perreira to create an eyewear collection. It consisted of two frame styles, both incorporating Spinelli's linked rings on the temple of the glasses.
- In 2019, the brand collaborated with retailer Elyse Walker, through her luxury boutique, on a collection of seven new designs featuring white diamonds and 18-karat gold, created to commemorate Walker's 20th anniversary in business. These pieces integrated the signature Galaxy-ring motif.
