= Haunted Honeymoon =

1986 film by Gene Wilder

- Theatrical release poster
- Directed by: Gene Wilder
- Written by: Gene Wilder; Terence Marsh
- Produced by: Susan Ruskin
- Starring: Gene Wilder; Gilda Radner; Dom DeLuise; Jonathan Pryce; Paul L. Smith
- Cinematography: Fred Schuler
- Edited by: Christopher Greenbury
- Music by: John Morris
- Distributed by: Orion Pictures
- Release date: July 25, 1986
- Running time: 82 minutes
- Country: United States
- Language: English
- Budget: $9 million
- Box office: $8 million

Haunted Honeymoon is a 1986 American comedy horror film starring Gene Wilder, Gilda Radner, Dom DeLuise and Jonathan Pryce. Wilder also served as writer and director. The film was distributed by Orion Pictures through a deal with HBO. Upon release it was considered a commercial failure, grossing just short of its $9 million budget and receiving generally negative reviews from critics. DeLuise was awarded the Golden Raspberry Award for Worst Supporting Actress for his performance in drag. Haunted Honeymoon was both Radner's final feature film appearance and Wilder's final film as director.

== Plot ==
In the 1930s, Larry Abbot and Vickie Pearle are performers on a hit radio show, Manhattan Mystery Theater, who are about to be married. Over the previous few weeks, Larry has been plagued by stammering and forgetting his lines, as well as a constant sense of fear, which has affected the show's ratings. In frustration, the show's sponsor and producers contact Larry's uncle, Dr. Paul Abbot, a noted psychologist. Paul believes that Larry's imminent wedding has disturbed something in his psyche that is frightening him, and decides to treat him by giving him a stronger fright, similarly to scaring away someone's hiccups.

Larry and Vickie travel to the castle-like mansion in which Larry grew up, now owned by his great-aunt Kate, to stay the weekend with Larry's family, leading up to their wedding. The other guests are Larry's uncles, Paul and Francis Sr., who is also Kate's lawyer; Larry's cousins Charles, Nora, and Susan; Larry's old girlfriend Sylvia, who is now dating Charles; and Susan's magician husband, Montego the Magnificent. Also present are the butler, Pfister, and his wife Rachel, the maid. Larry's final cousin, Francis Jr., was expected for the weekend but has disappeared.

That night, a hit man disguised as a werewolf is killed by the person who hired him to kill Larry. The hit man instead killed Francis Jr., having mistaken him for Kate. The killer attempts to stab Larry but is thwarted when Larry discovers Francis Jr.'s body in his bed. The killer quickly removes the body before Larry can return with Pfister, making Larry begin to doubt his sanity, especially when he then sees a deformed man walking down his wall and a ghostly apparition of Vickie.

Larry and Pfister find Francis Jr.'s body in the cellar. The killer, now donning the werewolf disguise, attacks Larry, reminding Pfister of Kate's earlier claim that one of her family members is a werewolf. Larry escapes, and Pfister discovers the hit man's body beneath Francis Jr.'s. The two try to bury the bodies, fearing Larry will be framed for the murders.

The murderer attacks them but is seen by Kate, who leads the family to find the dead bodies. They recover Pfister, but the murderer has already buried Larry alive in a glass coffin. While trapped, Larry has a flashback and realizes that his recent fears stem from a repressed memory of his mother being killed by a thunderstorm during her wedding. Meanwhile, Vickie realizes Charles is the murderer when he pretends to talk into a disconnected phone. Charles attacks her, but she flees and is joined by Larry, who has been freed by Kate and her dog. Charles and Larry struggle, but Kate arrives and shoots Charles to save Larry and Vickie.

Larry and Vickie are seen at the altar to be married, the scene cuts to them in the radio station, where the events are revealed to have been one of their radio plays. They go off the air and jubilantly leave the station to be married.

== Cast ==
- Gene Wilder as Larry Abbot
  - Alastair Haley as Young Larry Abbot
- Gilda Radner as Vickie Pearle
- Dom DeLuise as Katherine "Kate" Abbot, Larry's great-aunt and the owner of the mansion
- Jonathan Pryce as Charles "Charlie" Abbot, Larry's cousin
- Paul L. Smith as Dr. Paul Abbot, Larry's uncle, a psychologist
- Peter Vaughan as Francis Abbot Sr., Larry's uncle and Kate's lawyer
- Bryan Pringle as Pfister, the mansion butler
- Jim Carter as Montego, Susan's husband, a magician
- Eve Ferret as Sylvia Beach, Charles' girlfriend and Larry's ex-girlfriend
- Roger Ashton-Griffiths as Francis Abbot Jr., Larry's cousin
- Jo Ross as Susan Abbot, Larry's cousin
- Ann Way as Rachel, Kate's maid and Pfister's wife
- Julann Griffin as Nora Abbot, Larry's cousin
- Billy J. Mitchell as Cop
- Will Kenton as Werewolf
- Don Fellows as Producer
- Bill Bailey as Host
- David Healy as PR Man
- Matt Zimmerman as Radio Actor
- Barbara Rosenblat as Reporter
- William Hootkins as Reporter
- Mac McDonald as Reporter
- Sally Osborne as Mrs. Abbot, Larry's mother

== Production ==
=== Development ===
Gene Wilder wrote the opening scene while filming Silver Streak in 1976. He wanted to make a "comedy chiller" inspired by such films as The Cat and the Canary (1939), The Old Dark House (1932) and The Black Cat (1941), and radio shows like The Inner Sanctum. "Since I was six years old I have been scared of horror movies", said Wilder "And the movies that I liked the best - even though I was scared by them - were what was called then 'comedy-chillers'. They were horror movies yet they had comedy, or they were comedies and yet they had horror. They were not comedy-mysteries, they were not comedy-thrillers, they were comedy-chillers." Wilder says when he started writing the film "I knew I wanted it to be a comedy-chiller", but he struggled and the film wound up as an "autobiographical psycho/sexual comedy with music".

Wilder and Gilda Radner fell in love while making Hanky Panky (1982) and he decided to revisit the project as a vehicle for them both. "I always thought that Gilda has been one of our most brilliant television comediennes, but now I think she's becoming more than very good as a comic movie actress, which is a very, very different thing", said Wilder.

Wilder rewrote the script with writing partner, Terry Marsh. "I knew that I wanted it to be not a parody and not a satire, but to re-create a comedy-chiller", said Wilder. "I don't like naturalism. I like things that are fantastical - I'm not saying necessarily fantasies, but more than reality."

Wilder was partly inspired by a song from the 1930 film Monte Carlo that he heard while watching the film in bed with Radner. "I'm always looking for some emotional spine to what I'm doing. I look over at [Radner] and tears are coming down from her eyes. It was so sweet and innocent. Like little children. And I thought that's what [Haunted Honeymoon] is about." Radner added, "I couldn't imagine him singing it with any other girl. So, I just had a tantrum and said I had to be the fiancée - not a big tantrum, just a tiny tantrum."

Wilder was also inspired by seeing Jean Cocteau's Beauty and the Beast in the early 1980s. He commented, "I'm more comfortable when I don't have to be held down by authenticity. In this film, which is set in the '30s, I feel that I'm presenting authenticity of the heart. I'm not interested in everyday reality, but in the reality of the heart. I like fantasy, like a fairy tale. I'm interested in shadows and contrasts." Wilder said his aim was to "make a 1930s movie for 1986." He and the cinematographer used no primary colors and lit the film darkly as the audience "should feel that it's believable in the way that an old '30s film is believable." The title Haunted Honeymoon was previously used for the 1940 U.S. release of Busman's Honeymoon based on the stage play by Dorothy L. Sayers.

The movie was one of fourteen films financed by Orion Pictures through a deal with HBO.

=== Shooting ===
The film was shot in London at Elstree Studios in 1985 over 11 weeks. Radner commented, "For me, this is a part very similar to my own life. I wear a wedding gown in 95% of the movie. Since I didn't wear a gown when Gene and I got married, I asked the Haunted Honeymoon photographer to make me a wedding album!" Wilder and Radner celebrated their first wedding anniversary during filming in September.

Wilder told Dom DeLuise to play his role of Kate Abbot straight, telling him, "I want you to be my aunt. We'll get the laughs later. But first don't go for 'I'm-really-a-guy, I'm-really-a-guy-and-I'm-doing-this-little-joke.'"

Jonathan Pryce later recalled, "It was one of those films where, when there's a break and they’re doing the next setup and people usually go back to their dressing rooms, nobody went back to their dressing rooms. We'd all sit around in a circle ... and be entertained by Dom DeLuise. It was a blissful time."

== Release ==
Orion elected not to screen the film to critics before general release. Producer Susan Ruskin said:

I know people have the tendency to think, 'Well, the studio must not be comfortable about the film.' They're very comfortable about the film, they've been behind it 100 percent. A lot of the studios, with a lot of their films, are considering not doing advance critics' screenings. There has been a tendency with the critics lately to be quite vicious about films, and we don't necessarily feel it's right to cater to that. . . . I would like the people to make a judgment on the film.

== Reception ==
The film received unfavorable reviews. In The New York Times, Walter Goodman wrote that "with agreeable people like Mr. Wilder, Gilda Radner and Dom DeLuise (relatively restrained in the role of a dowager aunt) on call, a few laughs are guaranteed, but there just aren't enough of them amid the intentionally creaky creakings." Variety wrote that the film "provokes a few chuckles along the way, but no guffaws."

Sid Smith of the Chicago Tribune was negative of Wilder and many of the cast, criticizing the movie for "lamebrained, old-fashioned thinking behind every joke, character, set-up, plot device and even the set." In the British magazine White Dwarf, Alex Stewart wrote, "Amid Wilder's overindulgence in timid, repetitive gags, it's hard to sort out who's plotting with whom to bump off who else, and harder still to care. Only an admirably unpredictable performance from Dom DeLuise as wacky old Aunt Kate puts any kind of edge on the silliness at all."

However, some critics were more complimentary, with Kevin Thomas of the Los Angeles Times calling it "an amusing, bouncy horror comedy that has fun with not only the old-dark-house genre but also those corny but beloved scare shows of the Golden Age of Radio."

On review aggregator website Rotten Tomatoes, the film holds an approval rating of 9%, based on eleven reviews, and an average rating of 3.2/10. The film received a 29 rating on Metacritic. Audiences polled by CinemaScore gave the film an average grade "C−" on an A+ to F scale.

Dom DeLuise won the Golden Raspberry Award for Worst Supporting Actress for his performance in drag at the 7th Golden Raspberry Awards.

=== Box office ===
The movie was a financial flop, grossing $8 million in America and entering the box office at number 8, then slipping to 14 the following week. Another source said the film earned $3.2 million in the US.

In her autobiography, Radner described the film as "a bomb. One month of publicity and the movie was only in the theaters for a week – a box-office disaster."

== Legacy ==
The movie was Radner's last feature film appearance prior to her death in 1989, and the last directorial role for Wilder.

In a book about the 1985 film Clue, author John Hatch compared the two films, along with The Private Eyes, as all were period murder mystery comedies released in the 1980s that underperformed commercially. Hatch noted that "kids love all three even if adults (at first) don't" and that, in contrast to Murder by Death, "all three are closed-circle mysteries with endings that at least make some attempt at plausibility." Unlike Clue, however, Haunted Honeymoon and The Private Eyes "have their fans today [but] can hardly be considered cult favorites." Hatch also noted the film's similar setting to Radioland Murders, another unsuccessful murder mystery comedy.
