= Gilda Radner =

American actress and comedian (1946–1989)

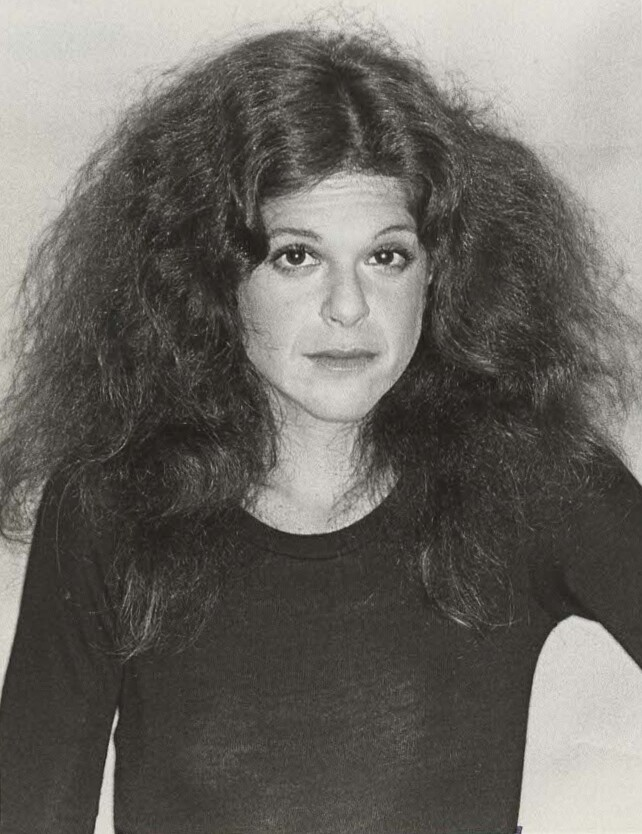
- Radner, c. 1979
- Born: June 28, 1946; Detroit, Michigan, U.S.
- Died: May 20, 1989 (aged 42); Los Angeles, California, U.S.
- Occupations: Actress; comedian
- Years active: 1972–1989
- Spouses: G. E. Smith (m. 1980; div. 1982); Gene Wilder (m. 1984)
- Relatives: Steve Ballmer (second cousin)

Gilda Susan Radner (June 28, 1946 – May 20, 1989) was an American actress and comedian.

Radner was one of the seven original cast members of the NBC sketch comedy series Saturday Night Live from its inception in 1975 until her departure in 1980. In her sketches on SNL, she played various original characters on the show's Weekend Update segment, such as the elderly, hard-of-hearing Emily Litella and the advice specialist Roseanne Roseannadanna, who rarely offered advice but often provided disgusting, off-topic stories. Radner won an Emmy Award for her performances on the show in 1978. She also portrayed those characters, among others, in her one-woman show Gilda, Live on Broadway in 1979 and later on film in 1980.

After leaving Saturday Night Live, Radner appeared in various films, including three with her future husband Gene Wilder, with whom she first appeared in 1982's Hanky Panky. She also worked on stage, appearing in the Broadway play Lunch Hour with Sam Waterston in 1980. She also continued to work on network and cable television, making appearances on Lorne Michaels' The New Show and It's Garry Shandling's Show.

After nearly a year of misdiagnoses, Radner was diagnosed with ovarian cancer in 1986 and died from the disease in 1989. Shortly before her death, she published her autobiography, It's Always Something, which dealt frankly with her life, work, and personal struggles, including her struggles with the illness. Her widower, Gene Wilder, carried out her wish that information about her illness would be used to help other people living with cancer, founding—and inspiring the founding of—organizations that emphasize early diagnosis, attention to hereditary factors, and support for cancer patients.

Posthumously, Radner won a Grammy Award in 1990, was inducted into the Michigan Women's Hall of Fame in 1992, and received a star on the Hollywood Walk of Fame in 2003. Other comedians have cited Radner as an influence on their work.

== Early life ==
Gilda Susan Radner was born on June 28, 1946 in Detroit, Michigan, to Jewish parents Henrietta (née Dworkin), a legal secretary, and Herman Radner, a businessman. In Radner's autobiography, she stated, "I was named after my grandmother whose name began with G, but 'Gilda' came directly from the movie with Glenn Ford and Rita Hayworth." Through her mother, Radner was a second cousin of business executive Steve Ballmer. She grew up in Detroit and spent the winters in Miami Beach, Florida, along with an older brother, Michael, and the family's nanny, Elizabeth Clementine Gillies, whom she called "Dibby" (and upon whom she based her famous character Emily Litella).

Radner was close to her father, who operated Detroit's Seville Hotel, where many nightclub performers and actors stayed while they were performing in the city. He took her on trips to New York to see Broadway shows. When Radner was 12, her father developed a brain tumor. Within days, he was bedridden, and he was unable to communicate. He remained in that condition until he died two years later. Radner's father was known to say "It's always something," the quote that would become associated with Radner's SNL character Roseanne Roseannadanna and the title of her autobiography.

Radner traced her sense of humor to her family growing up, describing her father to be "real funny", "loved to sing [...] and tap dance. I feel that some part of my father is back alive in me, back doing what he always wanted to do." She said her mother "[wasn't] consciously funny, but almost the only thing that gets through to her is to make her laugh. She has an infectious response to humor so it was a way of getting to her when nothing else worked." Radner also said her nanny "Dibby" helped her develop her sense of humor, teaching her to laugh at herself before other kids could.

As a child, Radner developed eating disorders, and would eat large amounts of food before going on diets. She wrote in her autobiography that she "coped with stress by having every possible eating disorder from the time I was nine years old. I have weighed as much as 160 pounds and as little as 93. When I was a kid, I overate constantly."

Radner attended the University Liggett School in Grosse Pointe Woods from 1957 to 1964. In 1964, Radner graduated from Liggett and enrolled at the University of Michigan at Ann Arbor. Sources vary on what she majored in; Radner said in her autobiography she majored in public speaking, while other sources said she majored in drama or education. While in college, Radner did weather reports at WCBN, the university's radio station. According to her friend David Saltman in his book Gilda: An Intimate Portrait, she would report on the weather in humorous ways, such as imitating a radio static. She also took part in theater productions both on and off campus.

== Career ==
=== Moving to Toronto and The Second City ===
In 1969, Radner dropped out of university to follow her boyfriend, Canadian sculptor Jeffrey Rubinoff, to Toronto. Radner was quoted in 1973 as saying that Toronto was "the answer to my dreams. It's a young city, open to new ideas and there are incredible opportunities for creative people." Initially, she intended to be a stay at home wife to Rubinoff, but Radner grew depressed, as she felt she wasn't able to perform like she wanted to, and was reduced to little more than helping prepare Rubinoff's art shows. Her friend David Saltman recalled that she would call him, complaining that she and Rubinoff would fight all the time. Eventually Radner left Rubinoff but remained in Toronto. During this time, she took classes at the University of Toronto and the University of Wisconsin's correspondence school to complete her degree.

Shortly after her break-up, Radner went to see a show at a theatre and decided to pursue acting. She worked at the theatre doing children's plays and also did pantomime performances at elementary schools across Toronto. Radner made her professional acting debut in the 1972 production of Godspell, with future stars Eugene Levy, Andrea Martin, Victor Garber, Martin Short, and Paul Shaffer. In 1973, Radner joined The Second City comedy troupe in Toronto and appeared in various productions there alongside comedians such as Dan Aykroyd, John Candy, Joe Flaherty and Catherine O'Hara.

She had one line of dialogue as a Buddhist group member in the 1973 film The Last Detail, starring Jack Nicholson and also appeared on various children's shows on CBC. Radner also appeared in The National Lampoon Radio Hour and the off-Broadway production of The National Lampoon Show.

=== Saturday Night Live ===
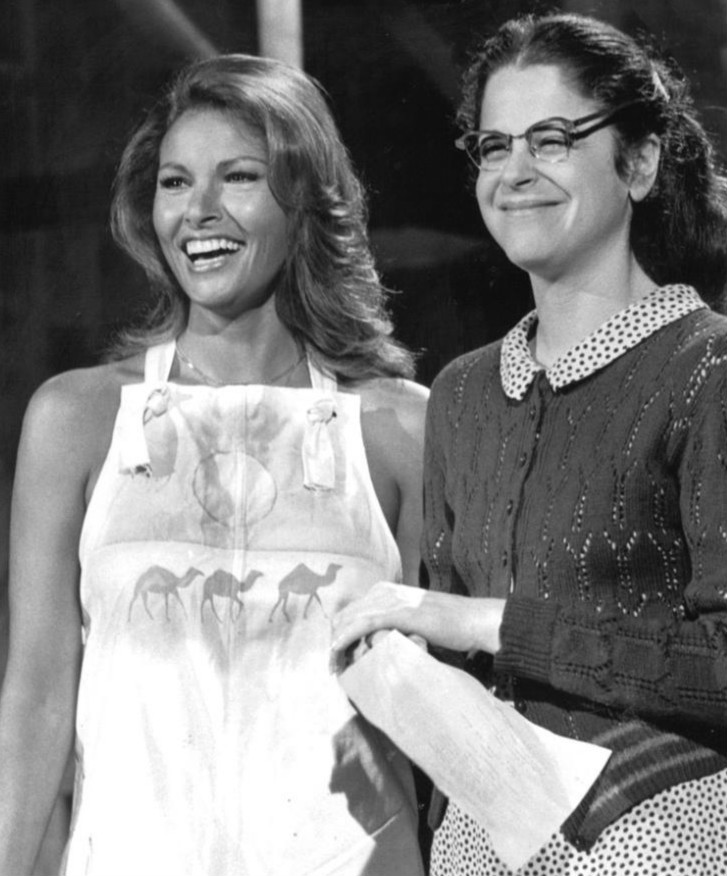
Radner, as Emily Litella, with Raquel Welch in 1976

Radner gained wide recognition in 1975 as one of the original "Not Ready for Prime Time Players," the freshman cast of the first season of Saturday Night Live. She was the first performer to be cast in the show, choosing the show over doing The David Steinberg Show in Canada.

Radner co-wrote much of the material that she performed and collaborated with writer Alan Zweibel on the development of sketches that featured her recurring characters. Some of Radner's characters included:

- Emily Litella, an elderly, hard-of-hearing editorialist who made irate, misinformed comments in interview sketches on SNL's recurring Weekend Update segment. She would often rant about a topic (often mishearing the initial topic, such as hearing violence on television as "violins on television") before being corrected, to which she would then say, "Never mind." Radner would later play Litella in her episode of The Muppet Show.
- Judy Miller, a hyper eight-year old girl with an overactive imagination. Sketches would consist of her bouncing off the walls of her bedroom, reenacting soap operas, and hosting a make-believe television program called "The Judy Miller Show." Radner based the character on her own childhood.
- Roseanne Roseannadanna, originally a character in a separate sketch, Roseannadanna became a regular on Weekend Update, usually receiving a question from a Richard Feder in Fort Lee, New Jersey, and subsequently answering Feder's questions with long, off-topic, and frequently disgusting answers. Jane Curtin would cut her off; she would end by saying, "It's always something." The character was based on Rose Ann Scamardella, a New York City reporter for WABC.
- Baba Wawa, a parody of Barbara Walters who spoke with a speech impediment that changed L's and R's to W's. In a 1978 interview with CBC, Radner said she listened to Walters and noticed that they both spoke with a sibilant, and that if she changed the L's and R's, she could imitate her. Walters did not enjoy the characterization, but later grew to appreciate it, and noted in an interview that Radner had been the "first person to make fun of news anchors, now it's done all the time."

Additionally Radner's celebrity impersonations and parodies included Lucille Ball, Patti Smith, Jacqueline Kennedy Onassis, and Olga Korbut. Radner was nominated for an Emmy Award for "Outstanding Continuing Or Single Performance By A Supporting Actress In Variety Or Music" in 1977, and won in 1978.

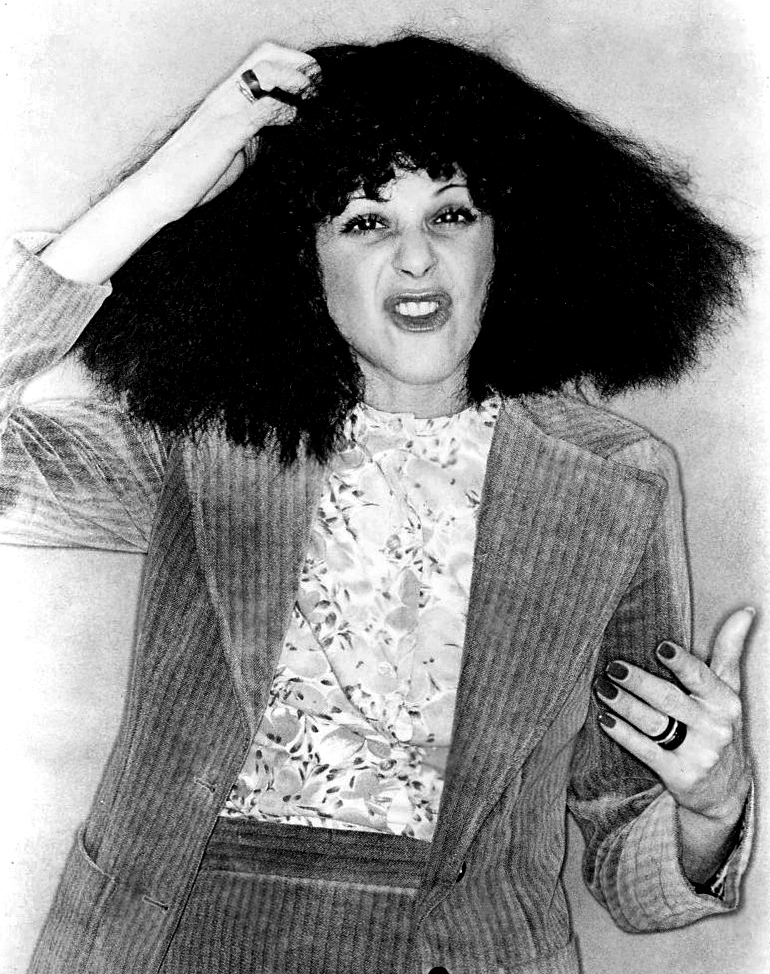
Radner as Roseanne Rosannadanna, 1980

In 1979, the new president and CEO of NBC, Fred Silverman, offered Radner a primetime variety show on the network, but she turned down the offer, not wanting to add another five years to her contract and not wanting to leave SNL. On January 9, 1979, she was a co-host of the Music for UNICEF Concert at the United Nations General Assembly. Radner also gave the commencement address, in character as Roseanne Roseannadanna, to the 1979 graduating class at the Columbia School of Journalism.

Radner reportedly expressed mixed emotions about being recognized and approached in public by fans and other strangers. SNL historians Doug Hill and Jeff Weingrad said she became "angry when she was approached, and upset when she wasn't". Radner's friend David Saltman also recounted Radner telling him that she never knew who admired her for who she was vs. who admired her because she was famous.

=== Broadway show ===
In 1979, Radner appeared on Broadway in a successful one-woman show, Gilda Radner – Live from New York. Produced by Lorne Michaels, the show featured material that was racier than NBC censors would allow on Saturday Night Live, such as the song "Let's Talk Dirty to the Animals." The same year, shortly before Radner's final season on Saturday Night Live, her Broadway show was filmed by director Mike Nichols and released with the title Gilda Live. It co-starred Paul Shaffer and Don Novello, and screened in theaters nationwide in 1980, but was a box-office flop. A soundtrack album was also commercially unsuccessful.

== Post Saturday Night Live career ==
=== In films ===
In 1980, Radner's contract with SNL expired and she left the show, along with Lorne Michaels and the rest of the cast. After leaving, Radner pursued new acting opportunities.

Radner's first film after leaving the show was 1980's First Family, with Bob Newhart and Madeline Kahn, in which Radner played the sexually frustrated daughter of the President of the United States. The film was unsuccessful. In 1982, she appeared in the Sidney Poitier-directed film Hanky Panky, alongside her future husband Gene Wilder. Subsequently, she would appear in two more films with Wilder, 1984's The Woman in Red, and 1986's Haunted Honeymoon. The three films were not particularly successful, though The Woman in Red performed adequately at the box office, and had the Academy Award winning song "I Just Called to Say I Love You" by Stevie Wonder. In her autobiography, Radner described Hanky Panky as "not-too-successful," The Woman in Red as "a nice enough success," and Haunted Honeymoon as "a bomb....a box-office disaster."

Radner's SNL castmate Laraine Newman said in a 2018 interview that she believed Radner's movie career had turned out to be mostly disappointing. According to Newman, this was because Hollywood directors and producers did not know how to cast Radner in roles where her comedic talents could best shine. "The specific nature of her talent was she did characters, and she would probably have been better served if she had taken part in writing the things that she did," Newman asserted. "But I don't think it occurred to her. If she and Alan Zweibel had collaborated on a feature, it might have been a whole different thing."

=== Other work ===
Outside of film, Radner continued to work in different mediums. In 1980, she began appearing with Sam Waterston in the Jean Kerr play Lunch Hour. They played two people whose spouses are having an affair, and who, in retaliation, begin an affair of their own consisting of lunch-hour trysts. The show ran for more than seven months, playing in various US theaters, including the John F. Kennedy Center for the Performing Arts in Washington, D.C. The Washington Post's Judith Martin and UPI's Glenne Curie praised Radner's performance as a highlight of the show, while New York Daily News' Douglas Watt and The Boston Globe's Kevin Kelly were more critical of her performance.

In 1983, Radner, along with Alan Zweibel, wrote Roseanne Roseannadanna's "Hey Get Back to Work!" Book. She continued to work on television, as well. In 1984, Radner appeared on an episode of Lorne Michaels' The New Show, a sketch comedy show featuring Valri Bromfield, John Candy, and Dave Thomas among others.

== Personal life ==
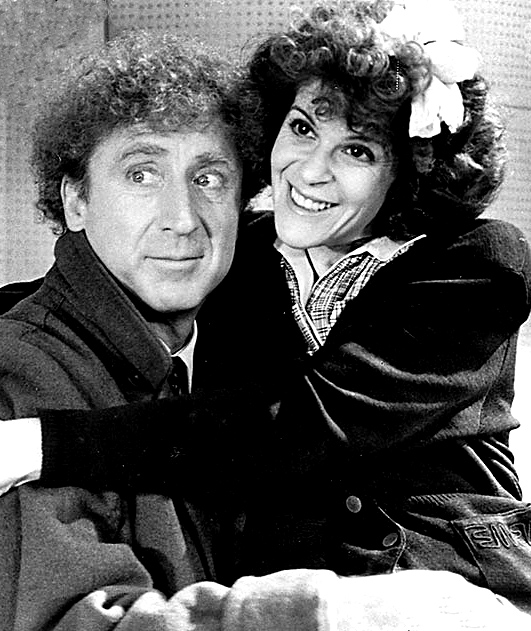
Radner with Gene Wilder in 1986

After breaking up with Jeffrey Rubinoff, Radner had an on-again-off-again relationship with Martin Short while both were appearing in Godspell. Radner had romantic involvements with several Saturday Night Live castmates, including Bill Murray (after a previous romance with his brother Brian Doyle-Murray) and Dan Aykroyd. Radner's friend Judy Levy recounted Radner saying she found Ghostbusters hard to watch since the cast included so many of her ex-boyfriends: Aykroyd, Murray, and Harold Ramis. Radner was married to musician G. E. Smith from 1980 to 1982; they met while working on her Broadway show. The couple lived in The Dakota building in Manhattan. After the shooting of Radner’s Dakota neighbor John Lennon in 1980 and the highly publicized narcotics-related death of her SNL colleague John Belushi in 1982, she sought more privacy and moved to a house in Stamford, Connecticut.

Radner met actor Gene Wilder on the set of Hanky Panky, when the two worked together on the production of the film. She described their first meeting as "love at first sight". After she met Wilder, her marriage to Smith deteriorated. Radner made a second film with Wilder, The Woman in Red (released in 1984), and their relationship deepened. The two were married on September 18, 1984, in Saint-Tropez. They made a third film together, Haunted Honeymoon, in 1986 and remained married until her death in 1989. She discovered that she was pregnant during the filming of Haunted Honeymoon, but miscarried from an ectopic pregnancy.

Details of Radner's eating disorder were reported in a book about Saturday Night Live by Doug Hill and Jeff Weingrad, which was published and received much media coverage during a period when Radner was consulting various doctors in Los Angeles about symptoms of an illness she was suffering that turned out to be cancer.

== Illness and death ==
In 1985, while she was on the set of Haunted Honeymoon in the United Kingdom, Radner began to feel severe fatigue, and she also began to feel severe pain in her upper legs. She sought medical treatment, and for a period of 10 months, various doctors, most of them in Los Angeles, gave her several diagnoses, but all of them turned out to be wrong; meanwhile, she continued to feel pain.

During those 10 months, she also faced hardships such as the publication of Hill and Weingrad's highly publicized book about Saturday Night Live, which contained many details about her eating disorder as well as the financial failure of Haunted Honeymoon, which had only grossed $8,000,000 in the United States, entering the box-office-returns ranking at number 8, then slipping to 14 the following week.

Finally, on October 21, 1986, Radner was diagnosed with stage IV ovarian cancer. She immediately underwent surgery and had a hysterectomy. On October 26, surgeons removed a grapefruit-size tumor from her abdomen. Radner then began chemotherapy and radiation therapy treatment, as she wrote in It's Always Something, and the treatment caused extreme physical and emotional pain.

After her diagnosis, the National Enquirer ran the headline "Gilda Radner In Life-Death Struggle" in its following issue. Without asking for her comment, the editors of the publication asserted that she was dying. Radner wrote in It's Always Something:

They found an old photo of me looking frightened from a 'Saturday Night Live' sketch and blew that up to make the point. What they did probably sold newspapers, but it had a devastating effect on my family and my friends. It forced Gene [Wilder] to compose a press release to respond. He said that I had been diagnosed with ovarian cancer, had surgery, and my prognosis was good. The Enquirer doesn't like good news, so the Gilda Radner story stopped running.

Radner saw her Saturday Night Live castmates for the last time at Laraine Newman's 36th birthday party in March 1988.

=== Remission ===
After Radner was told that she had gone into remission, she wrote the book It's Always Something (a catchphrase of her character Roseanne Roseannadanna), which included details of her struggle with the illness. Life did a March 1988 cover story on her illness, titled "Gilda Radner's Answer to Cancer: Healing the Body with Mind and Heart."

Wanting to return to television, Radner guest-starred on It's Garry Shandling's Show on March 18, 1988, unannounced, mentioning on-camera that a cancer diagnosis and treatment explained the long hiatus in her entertainment career. According to Alan Zweibel, Radner had been nervous about appearing on the show, worrying that she had been out of the spotlight so long that no one would remember her. When she appeared on camera, she received a loud round of applause. It would be her final TV appearance. After the appearance, HBO president Michael Fuchs discussed the possibility of giving Radner a new show created by Zweibel and Shandling.

Radner was scheduled to host an episode of Saturday Night Live in the spring of 1988, which would have made her the first female former cast member to host the show, but the writers' strike forced production to shut down before the end of the season.

=== Recurrence, death, and SNL response ===
In September 1988, after tests showed no signs of cancer, Radner went on a maintenance chemotherapy treatment to prolong her remission, but three months later, in December, she learned that the cancer had returned.

On May 17, 1989, she was admitted to Cedars-Sinai Medical Center in Los Angeles to undergo a CT scan. She was given a sedative and lapsed into a coma during the scan. She did not regain consciousness and died three days later, on May 20, 1989; Wilder was at her side.

News of Radner's death broke as Steve Martin was rehearsing for his guest-host role on that night's season finale of Saturday Night Live. The show's performers and crew, including Lorne Michaels, Phil Hartman, and Mike Myers (who said he had "fallen in love" with Radner after playing her son in a BC Hydro commercial on Canadian television and considered her the reason he wanted to be on SNL), had been unaware of the severity of Radner's condition.

Martin abandoned his opening monologue, and he tearfully introduced a video clip of a 1978 sketch in which he and Radner had parodied Fred Astaire and Cyd Charisse in the dance routine "Dancing in the Dark" from The Band Wagon (1953). After the clip, Martin said it reminded him of "how great she was, and of how young I looked. Gilda, we miss you." G. E. Smith, Radner's first husband, who was Saturday Night Live's bandleader, wore a black armband throughout the episode.

Radner is interred at Long Ridge Union Cemetery in Stamford, Connecticut.

== Legacy ==
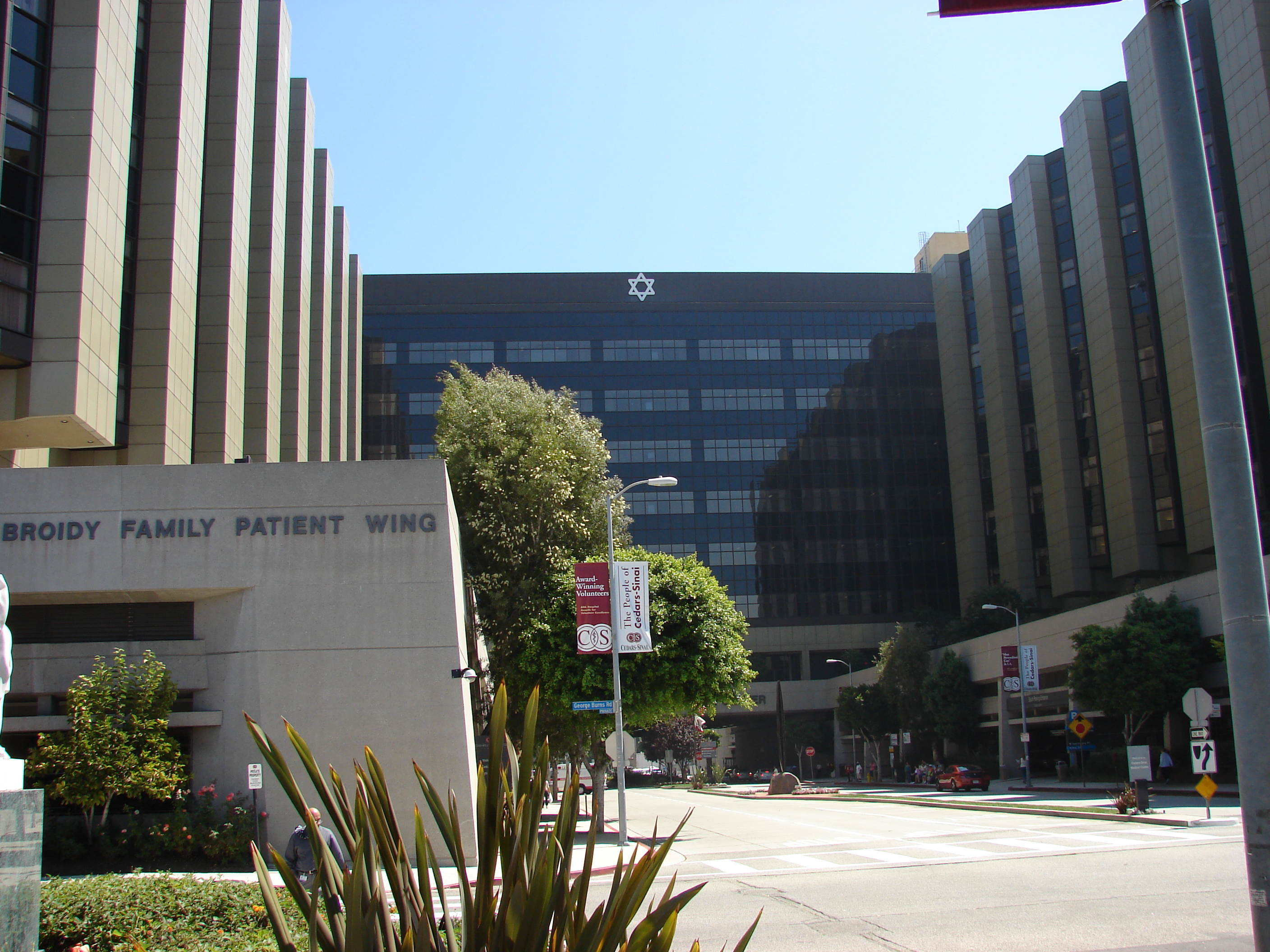
Cedars-Sinai Medical Center hosts the Gilda Radner Ovarian Cancer Detection Center.

=== In comedy ===
In her 2012 book, We Killed: The Rise of Women in American Comedy, Yael Kohen wrote, "Of the three female [SNL] cast members, Gilda Radner made the deepest impact. There is hardly a female sketch comic today who does not claim Radner as an inspiration for her comedy career."

In Rolling Stone's February 2015 appraisal of all 141 SNL cast members to date, Radner was ranked ninth in importance. "[Radner was] the most beloved of the original cast," they wrote. "In the years between Mary Tyler Moore and Seinfeld's Elaine, Radner was the prototype for the brainy city girl with a bundle of neuroses."

Writers and comedians who have cited Radner as an influence include Lena Dunham, Melissa McCarthy, Amy Poehler, and Maya Rudolph. At the premiere for the documentary film Love, Gilda, Tina Fey said, "She was our equivalent to Michelle Obama. She was so lovely and she was so authentically herself and so regular in so many ways … We all saw that and said: 'I wanna do that.'"

=== Cancer awareness and treatment ===
Radner's death helped raise awareness of the early detection of ovarian cancer and the connection to familial epidemiology. The media attention in the two years after Radner's death led to the registry of 450 families with familial ovarian cancer at the Familial Ovarian Cancer Registry, a research database registry at Roswell Park Comprehensive Cancer Center in Buffalo, New York. The registry was renamed the Gilda Radner Familial Ovarian Cancer Registry (GRFOCR) in 1990 and renamed the Familial Ovarian Cancer Registry in 2013. In 1996, Wilder and Registry founder Steven Piver, one of Radner's medical consultants, published Gilda's Disease: Sharing Personal Experiences and a Medical Perspective on Ovarian Cancer.

Wilder established the Gilda Radner Hereditary Cancer Program at Cedars-Sinai to screen high-risk candidates (such as women of Ashkenazi Jewish descent) and to run basic diagnostic tests. He testified before a Congressional committee that Radner's condition had been misdiagnosed and that if doctors had inquired more deeply into her family background, they would have learned that her grandmother, aunt, and a cousin had all died of ovarian cancer, and therefore they might have attacked the disease earlier.

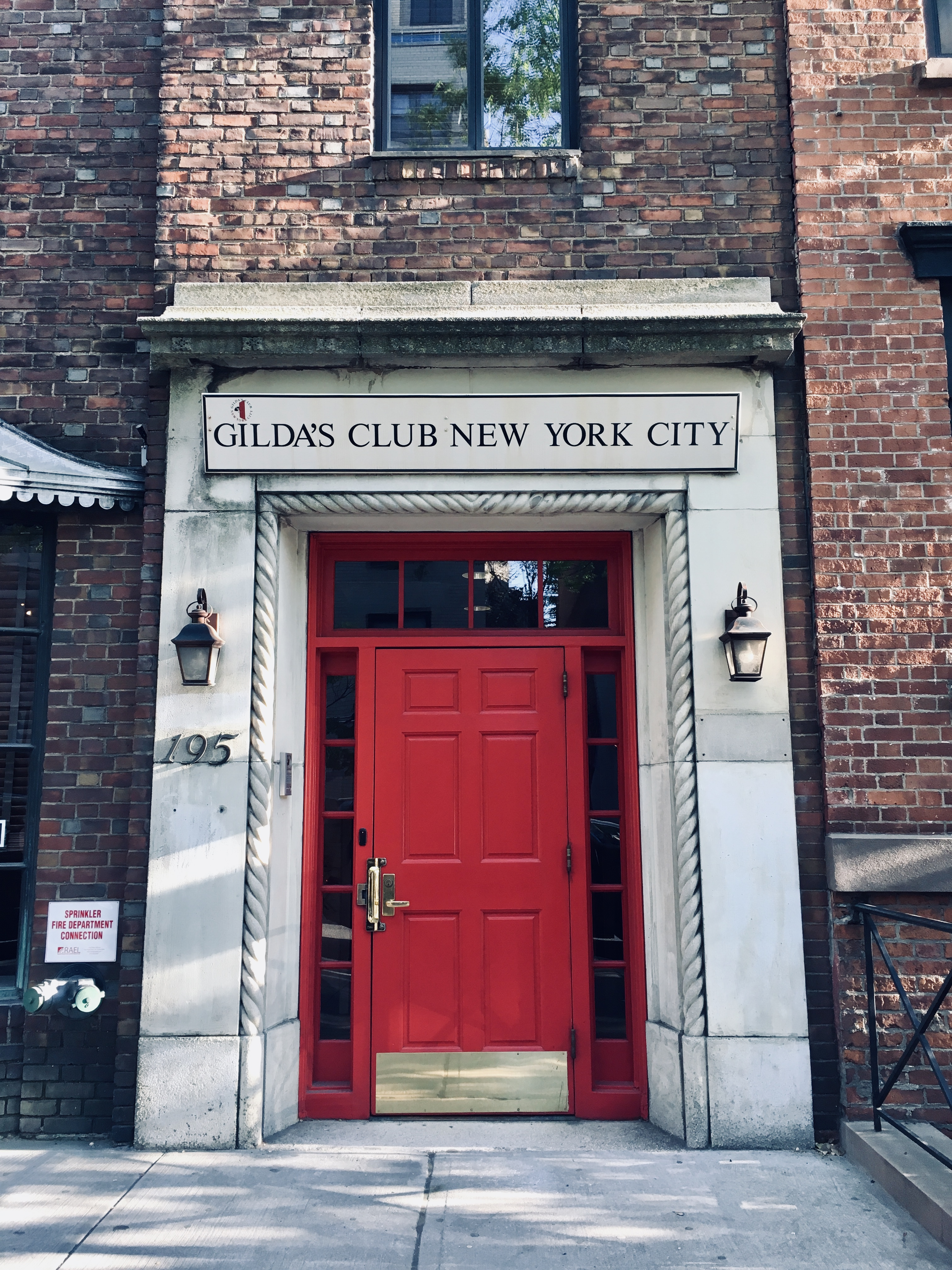
Gilda's Club location in New York City

In 1991, Gilda's Club, a network of affiliated clubhouses where people living with cancer, their friends, and families, can meet to learn how to live with cancer, was founded by Joanna Bull, Radner's cancer psychotherapist, along with Radner's widower, Gene Wilder (also a cancer survivor) and broadcaster Joel Siegel (who died in 2007 following a long battle with colon cancer). The first club opened in New York City in 1995. The organization took its name from Radner's comment that cancer gave her "membership to an elite club I'd rather not belong to".

Many Gilda's Clubs have opened across the United States and in Canada. In July 2009, Gilda's Club Worldwide merged with The Wellness Community, another established cancer support organization, to become the Cancer Support Community (CSC). As of 2012, more than 20 local affiliates of Gilda's Club were active. Although some local affiliates of Gilda's Club and The Wellness Community have retained their names, many affiliates have adopted the name Cancer Support Community following the merger.

=== Other tributes ===
On September 26, 1992, much of the original cast of Godspell reunited for a one-night performance of the show as a tribute to Radner and to raise money for the Genesis Research Foundation, which specialized in ovarian cancer research.

In 1997, Bunny, Bunny: Gilda Radner: A Sort of Romantic Comedy, Alan Zweibel's play about his friendship with Radner (based on his memoir with the same name) ran for 73 performances at New York's off-Broadway Lucille Lortel Theatre. Paula Cale played Gilda, Bruno Kirby played Zwiebel, and all the other roles (more than twenty) were played by Alan Tudyk in his New York stage debut (a feat for which he won the Clarence Derwent Award).

In 2002, ABC dedicated a three-hour block of programming to Radner. The evening kicked off with a one-hour special, Gilda Radner's Greatest Moments. Hosted by Saturday Night Live alumnus Molly Shannon, the special featured highlights from her career and appearances by stars and friends including Victor Garber, Eugene Levy, Steve Martin, Paul Shaffer, Lily Tomlin, and Barbara Walters. It was followed by a television movie about her life: Gilda Radner: It's Always Something, starring Jami Gertz as Radner.

In 2007, Radner was featured in Making Trouble, a film tribute to female Jewish comedians produced by the Jewish Women's Archive.

In 2015, for the Saturday Night Live 40th Anniversary Special, Radner was honored with other deceased cast and crew members over the show's history. Additionally, during the Weekend Update segment, Emma Stone played Roseanne Roseannadanna as a tribute to Radner.

Ella Hunt portrays Radner in the 2024 film Saturday Night. In 2025, for SNL's 50th anniversary, her co-stars Newman and Jane Curtin held up a photograph of her during the "farewell" segment of the show.

Jordan Kai Burnett portrayed Radner in 2024 and 2025 productions of Gene & Gilda, a play by Cary Gitter about Radner's years with Gene Wilder.

== Awards and honors ==
Radner was nominated for an Emmy Award for "Outstanding Continuing or Single Performance by a Supporting Actress in Variety or Music" three times between 1977 and 1979 for her work on Saturday Night Live, winning in 1978. She posthumously won a Grammy Award for "Best Spoken Word Or Non-Musical Recording" in 1990. In 1992, Radner was posthumously inducted into the Michigan Women's Hall of Fame for her achievements in arts and entertainment.

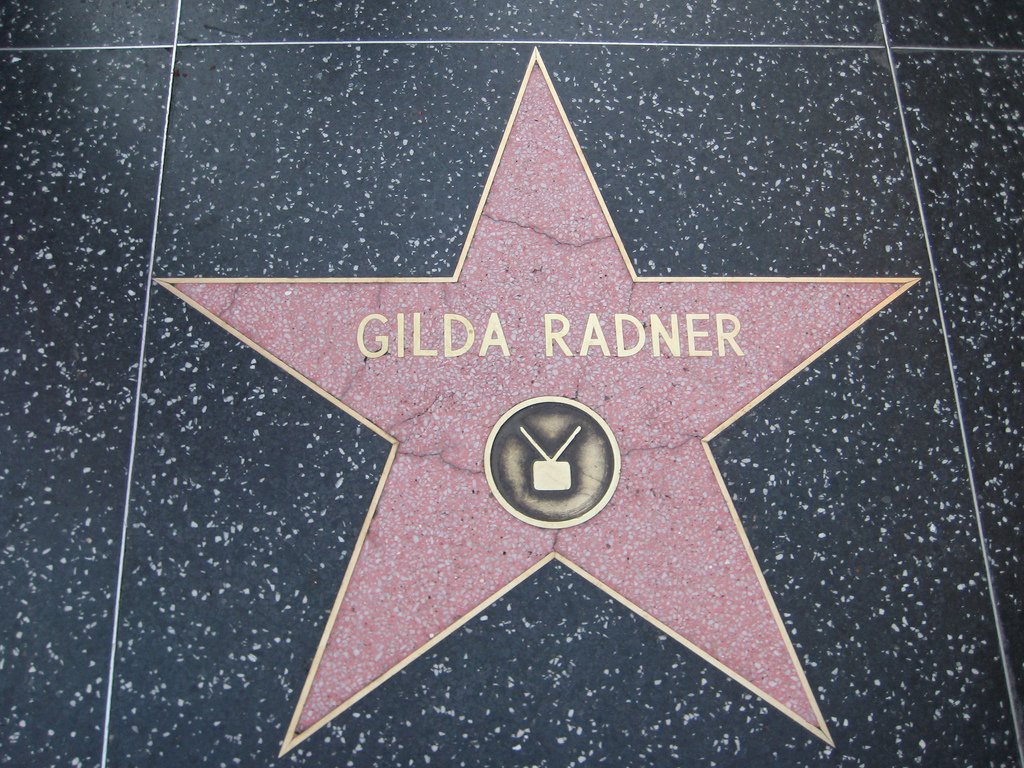
Radner's star on the Hollywood Walk of Fame

Producer/actor James Tumminia spearheaded a campaign to dedicate a posthumous star on the Hollywood Walk of Fame to Radner. On June 27, 2003, Radner received her star on the Hollywood Walk of Fame at 6801 Hollywood Blvd. Saturday Night Live alumna Molly Shannon (and the host of the ABC special) served as Master of Ceremonies at the induction ceremony at which Laraine Newman, Gilda's Club founder Joanna Bull, and Radner's brother, Michael F. Radner, presented the honor.

Parts of West Houston Street in New York City, Lombard Street in Toronto, and Chester Avenue in White Plains, New York, have been renamed "Gilda Radner Way". The private road off Kirk Road in Warminster Township, Pennsylvania, leading to the Cancer Support Community Greater Philadelphia (formerly Gilda's Club Delaware Valley) is also thusly named.

Awards and nominations
Year	Award	Category	Title	Result
1977	Emmy Award	Outstanding Continuing or Single Performance by a Supporting Actress in Variety or Music	Saturday Night Live	Nominated
1978	Emmy Award	Outstanding Continuing or Single Performance by a Supporting Actress in Variety or Music	Saturday Night Live	Won
1981	Grammy Award	Best Comedy Recording	Live from New York	Nominated
1988	Emmy Award	Outstanding Guest Performer In A Comedy Series	It's Garry Shandling's Show	Nominated
1990	Grammy Award	Best Spoken Word or Non-musical Recording	It's Always Something	Won
1992	Michigan Women's Hall of Fame	Entertainer		Won
2003	Hollywood Walk of Fame	Television		Won

== Filmography ==
=== Films ===
Year	Title	Role	Notes
1973	The Last Detail	Nichiren Shōshū Member	
1979	Mr. Mike's Mondo Video	Herself	
1980	Gilda Live	Herself / Various Characters	Also writer
1980	First Family	Gloria Link	
1982	Hanky Panky	Kate Hellman	
1982	It Came from Hollywood	Herself	
1984	The Woman in Red	Ms. Milner	
1985	Movers & Shakers	Livia Machado	
1986	Haunted Honeymoon	Vickie Pearle	
2018	Love, Gilda	Herself	Documentary (archive footage)

=== Television ===
Year	Title	Role	Notes
1974	Jack: A Flash Fantasy	Jill of Hearts	
1974	The Gift of Winter	Nicely / Malicious / Narrator	Voice
1974–1975	Dr. Zonk and the Zunkins	—	Voice
1975–1980	Saturday Night Live	Various characters	107 episodes; also writer
1978	The Muppet Show	Herself	1 episode
1978	Witch's Night Out	Witch	Voice
1978	All You Need Is Cash	Mrs. Emily Pules	Television film, cameo
1979	Bob & Ray, Jane, Laraine & Gilda	Herself	
1980	Animalympics	Barbara Warbler / Brenda Springer / Coralee; Perrier / Tatiana Tushenko / Doree Turnell / The Contessa	Television film, Voice
1985	Reading Rainbow	Herself	Voice only; 1 episode
1988	It's Garry Shandling's Show	Herself	1 episode, final appearance

== See also ==
- Friends of Gilda
- Gilda's Club
