= Elyse Walker =

American fashion designer and retailer

- Born: May 22, 1967 (age 59); Scarsdale, New York, US
- Education: Columbia University
- Occupation: Fashion designer
- Organization(s): Capretto, Towne by Elyse Walker
- Website: www.elysewalker.com

Elyse Walker (born May 22, 1967) is an American fashion designer, retailer, and owner of Capretto LLC.

== Early life and education ==
Walker was born on May 22, 1967, and grew up in Scarsdale, New York. She started working during high school at her mother's shoe store in Scarsdale. Walker has received a degree in applied mathematics from Columbia University.

== Career ==
Walker opened her first store, Capretto Shoes, in 1987 in Manhattan, New York. She later moved to Los Angeles when her husband had to move due to his job in 1996. In 1999, she opened her first namesake boutique, Elyse Walker. The boutique sold clothing by Isabel Marent, MadeWorn, William B, Katayone Adeli, and Velvet. Walker opened the second branch of the boutique in 2016 in Newport Beach, California. The second boutique included jewelry, denim, shoes, handbags, and other items. In 2021, she opened the third branch of the boutique at The Commons at Calabasas, California.

In 2011, Walker partnered with the team of Revolve to be the fashion director of their site, Forward. Later in 2012, she launched a shopping site Forward by Elyse Walker.

Walker launched a footwear line, elysewalker Los Angeles, in her mother's memory in 2014. After one year, with Sable Banoun, she launched a clothing line of leather, knits, and suede jackets, ThePerfext.

Walker opened the men's and women's luxury concept store, Towne by Elyse Walker at Palisades Village, in 2018. The store sells items like denim, knits, vintage tees, footwear and is currently located at three locations, including Newport Beach and Los Angeles.

In 2018, Walker was awarded the Retailer of the Year by Los Angeles Business Journal and was also honored by the Women's Guild Cedars-Sinai annual luncheon in 2019.

=== Pink Party ===
In 2005, Walker organized a reception in Santa Monica in honor of her mother, Barbara Feder, who died from ovarian cancer and raised funds for cancer research. The event evolved into an annual fundraiser, Pink Party, where they raise money to benefit the Women's Cancer Program (WCP) at Cedars-Sinai Samuel Oschin Comprehensive Cancer Institute. In 2014, the director of the WCP, Beth Karlan, announced a women's cancer tissue screening lab at Cedars would be named after Walker. From 2005 till 2014, the event raised more than $11.5 million for cancer research and treatment.

Walker and her husband were honored by The Wellness Community West Los Angeles in 2009 for their organization in providing support, education, and help to the people affected by cancer.

== Personal life ==
Walker is married to a real estate developer, David Walker, and has two sons. She owned a private retreat, Casa Yvonne, in San Jose del Cabo, Mexico. It was sold in 2019.
