= David Saltman =

David Bruce Saltman (born 1946) is an author, director and producer. He has written and produced more than 200 documentary films, and is the owner of Pinnacle Productions Inc, a New York media production company. He wrote a biography of Gilda Radner entitled Gilda: An Intimate Portrait published in 1993. Saltman was awarded an Emmy Award for Best Business Story. He has been an executive producer at CNN for TV programmes such as Pinnacle, Business Unusual, Your Money and Movers. Previously, he was a producer and writer for CBS News Sunday Morning with Charles Kuralt, CBS Morning News and for Good Morning America at ABC.

Saltman was lead producer for CBS News' award-winning coverage of the life and death of Josef Mengele, the Nazi war criminal.

The bulk of Saltman's documentary work has been for major TV companies and public television networks. He has also written for three feature films. He has written and reported extensively for newspapers and magazines, notably The New York Times and Rolling Stone. He is also a consultant on the history of magic to the Library of Congress and has taught writing and filmmaking at various universities.

== Publications ==
- The Marrakech Express: A Train of Thought Links Books (1973) with Paul Hyman ISBN 0825630061
- The Great Escape Bantam Books (1974) Co-Creator & Head Writer (with Yee & Wright) ISBN 978-0552685597
- The Sports Book Bantam Books (1976) Co-Creator with Yee & Wright ISBN 9780030151019
- Gilda: An Intimate Portrait Contemporary Books (1993) ISBN 0809238152
- Grand Master Hudson River Books (2017) with Alex Dong ISBN 0998532908
- HOUDINI UNBOUND: Espionage in Russia Hudson River Books (2017) ISBN 0998532959
