= Jeffrey Rubinoff =

Canadian artist (1945–2017)

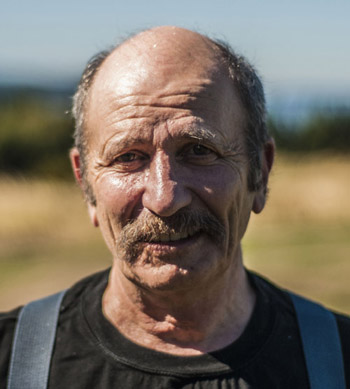
- 2015 Photo of Sculptor Jeffrey Rubinoff
- Born: October 23, 1945; London, Ontario
- Died: January 24, 2017 (aged 71); Hornby Island, British Columbia
- Education: Studied fine art in the United States and completed his Master of Fine Arts in 1969
- Known for: Sculptor
- Notable work: Over 100 in 9 series
- Partner: Betty Kennedy

Jeffrey Rubinoff (October 23, 1945 – January 24, 2017) was a Canadian sculptor and founder of the Jeffrey Rubinoff Sculpture Park on Hornby Island where he lived and worked since 1973. He produced over 100 sculptures in the last four decades.

== Biography ==
Rubinoff, a London, Ontario artist, studied fine art in the United States and completed his Master of Fine Arts in 1969. Subsequently he returned to Canada to pursue his artistic career which included one man shows at the Mazelow Gallery in Toronto, the Ontario Science Centre in Toronto, the Nathan Manilow Sculpture Park in Chicago (he was the first Canadian to be given a major solo show there in 1996), Queen's Park in Toronto, York University in Toronto, and the Two Sculptors Gallery in New York which he co-founded with Don Bonham.

In the early 1970s, Rubinoff moved to a 200-acre (81 ha) farm on Hornby Island in British Columbia, living and working on-site for the next four decades to create the majority of his work. His works ranged from human to monumental scale, and are created exclusively from welded or cast, stainless and CORTEN steel. Rubinoff created all his sculptures unassisted, and his studio included a one-man steel foundry, which makes it possible to cast the organic forms found in the later series. In addition to the sculpture, Rubinoff, with the help of John Kirk, designed many landscape alterations that have reshaped the farm and original wilderness landscape to suit the exhibition of his sculpture, making it into a large conceptual piece in itself. In Series 1 of his sculpture, Rubinoff consciously echoed David Smith; Series 2 drew upon Anthony Caro and Richard Serra; in Series 3-5, he found his own voice within modernist sculpture, using balance and counterpoint, and positive and negative space to evoke the counterpoint in the late string quartets of Ludwig van Beethoven.

During the 1990s, Rubinoff focused on historical group exhibitions, including David Smith, Anthony Caro, Alexander Calder, Nancy Graves, Mark di Suvero, Tony Smith, George Rickey, Beverly Pepper, and Robert Murray.

With regard to the predominant art of his time Rubinoff has stated:

"For my generation of artists, culture was defined by marketing. The art market defined originality as novelty. I realized that to make original art with artistic depth I would have to return to the lineage of the ancestors — the history of art by artists. So began a dialogue with the ancestors, artist to artist via the work itself."

Mark Daniel Cohen has written that Rubinoff is one of a rare group of sculptors who practice abstraction in the authentic form envisioned by the early Modernists:

"Rubinoff's manner of abstraction is a conscientious effort to pursue the original and authentic purpose of abstraction: to reveal a portion of truth — not to practice art simply for its own sake but to seek an insight into the nature of reality itself, the nature of that which lies beyond art, of that which lies beyond the appearances that abstract art was devised to dispense with. ...

"Abstraction in its true manner is an ambitious artistic project, one that arose during one of the most remarkable periods of intellectual adventure in the history of Western civilization and whose real purpose has been maintained for decades strictly through the devotion of artists who understood the aspiration of the mode."

=== Company of Ideas Forums at the Jeffrey Rubinoff Sculpture Park ===
In May 2008, the farm on which Rubinoff has lived and worked for over four decades was inaugurated as the Jeffrey Rubinoff Sculpture Park (JRSP). It is the largest sculpture park devoted to the work of an artist in Canada.

The park was formally opened to the public with an Inaugural Forum entitled The Company of Ideas which became one of the annual activities of the park. At that forum he presented a series of prepared statements as part of the context of his artistic work.

Rubinoff has termed these statements "insights" which have evolved with and from his sculpture work, and which have been chosen as themes for discussion at the forums. Among these insights, that of The End of the Age of Agriculture has been the most intensely debated by the various invited scholars.

As 2010 forum speaker Dr. Lawrence Badash, Professor Emeritus of the History of Science at the University of California, Santa Barbara, stated:

Sculptor Jeffrey Rubinoff has advanced the concept that we now live in a period after the End of the Age of Agriculture: From the prehistoric invention of agriculture to the end of World War II, people embraced a social contract with what became the ruling warrior class. Wars were fought for arable land and eventually for other resources, while the larger population produced wealth in return for protection. Over millennia, nations came and went, but the relationship proved to be remarkably stable. It ended, however, with the development of strategic bombing during World War II and the advent of nuclear weapons in the war's closing days.

As Rubinoff noted, "the fundamental assumptions of the age of agriculture, security of territory as the means to secure food production, must be revised to the era of global vulnerability." The warrior class has become impotent to protect its people. At present, the failed social contract has not been replaced. We struggle to conceive of new institutions.

=== Jeffrey Rubinoff Fellowship in Art as a Source of Knowledge ===
In 2014, Churchill College, Cambridge University jointly established the Jeffrey Rubinoff Fellowship in Art as a Source of Knowledge with sculptor Jeffrey Rubinoff. The Fellowship supports early career postdoctoral researchers working in the field of Art as a Source of Knowledge, with a focus on the visual arts.

In addition to independent research and teaching, the role of the Rubinoff Fellow is to participate in the annual Jeffrey Rubinoff Sculpture Park Company of Ideas Forum on Hornby Island, British Columbia, Canada, as well as at associated events at Cambridge University.

In 2015, Vid Simoniti, who completed his doctoral thesis on 'The Epistemic Value in Contemporary Art' at the Ruskin School of Art, Oxford University, was selected to be first Rubinoff Fellow.

== Personal life ==
Jeffrey Rubinoff died on January 24, 2017, at age 71, near his home on Hornby Island in British Columbia, Canada. Rubinoff was a former boyfriend of comedienne Gilda Radner.

Representative Pieces from Rubinoff's Various Sculpture Series

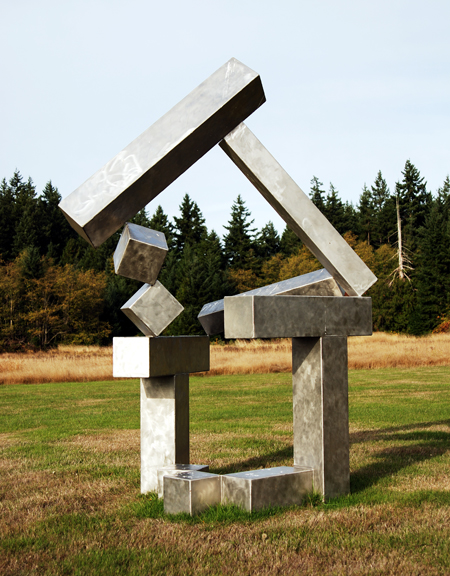
Series 1 – 8, 1982

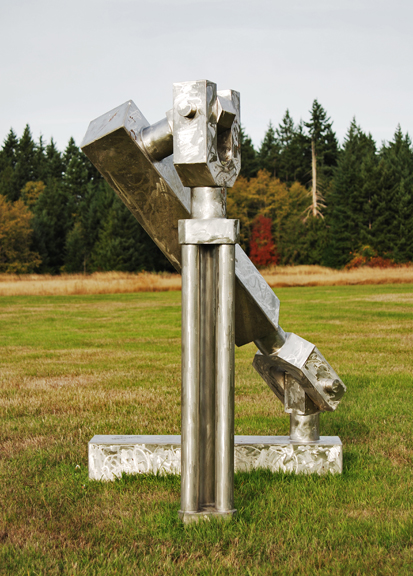
Series 2 – 5, 1983

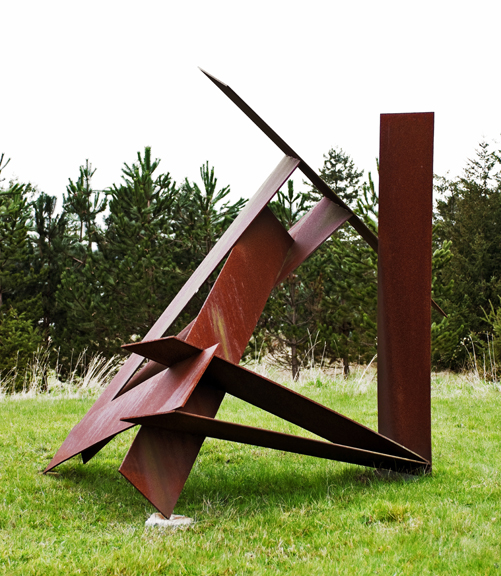
Series 3 – 3, 1983

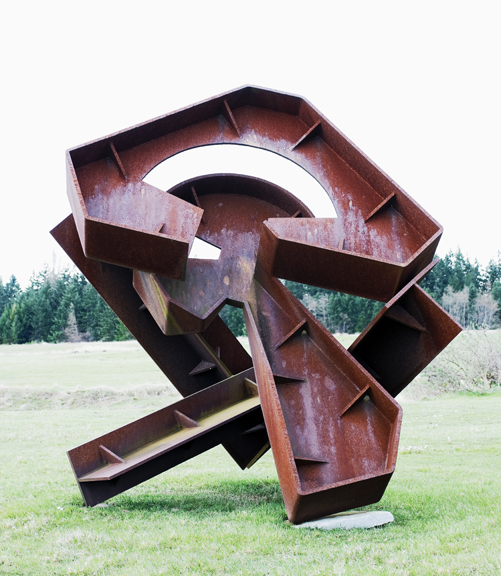
Series 4 – 8, 1985

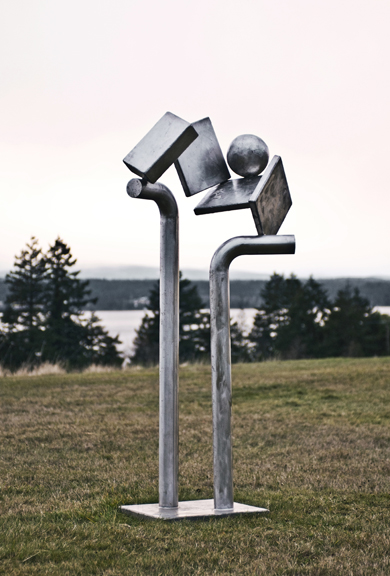
Series 5 – 12, 1989

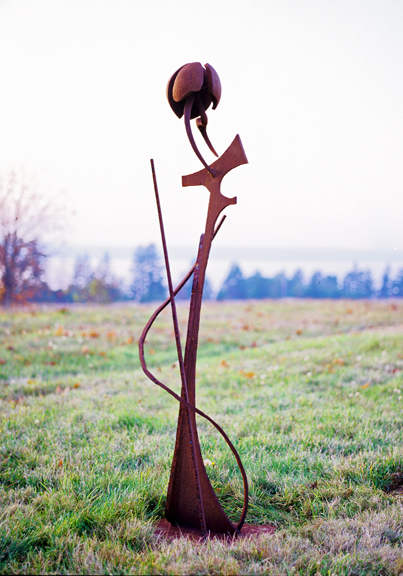
Series 6 – Andromeda 2, 1992

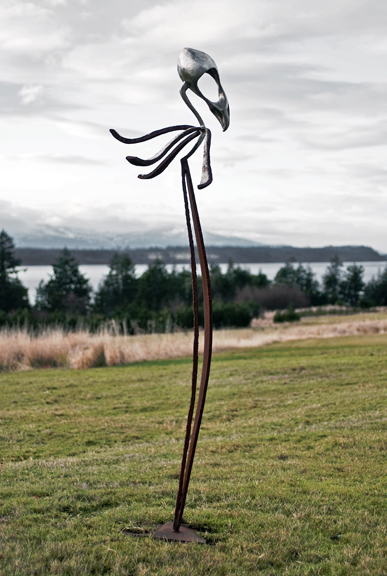
Series 7 – 3 (Hunter 3), 1997

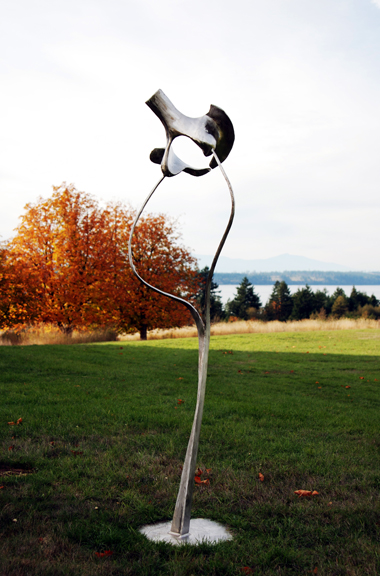
Series 8 – 3 (Hunter 8), 2001

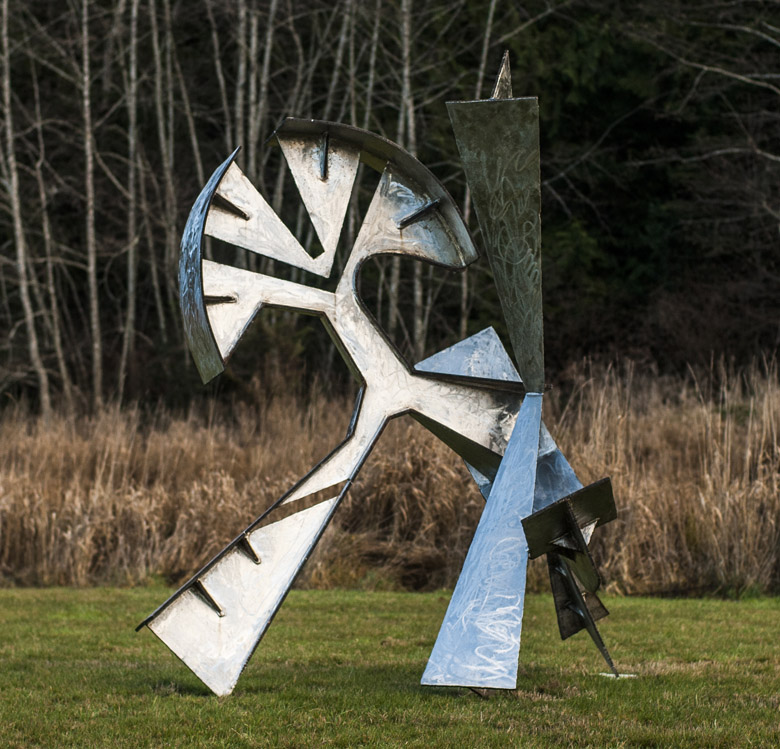
Series 9 - 1, 2010
