= Friends of Gilda =

1993 television special

Friends of Gilda was a 1993 ninety-minute television special made by CBC Television to benefit the Genesis Research Foundation, the research fundraising arm of the University of Toronto’s Department of Obstetrics and Gynecology. Its original air date was 21 November 1993.

The fundraiser was a tribute to Gilda Radner, who died of ovarian cancer in 1989 and featured a long list of performers with whom she was friendly. Among these were the "surviving cast members" who had shared the stage with Gilda Radner in the celebrated Toronto production of Godspell which was her professional stage debut. Others appearing in the special knew her from Second City Toronto. Several—including Eugene Levy and Andrea Martin—fell into both those categories.

The special was directed by Martin Short, who had dated Radner when they were both in Godspell. Short also appeared in the show itself and shared writing credit with Perry Rosemond. Paul Shaffer, who conducted and played piano for the same Toronto production of Godspell, appeared as music director.

The special included songs from Godspell, backstage footage of the production, several clips from Saturday Night Live, and four comedy sketches:

- The first sketch, "Rehearsal", featured John Candy as an actor unable to remember his lines. Joe Flaherty and Eugene Levy also appeared as actors playing actors in that sketch.
- The second sketch, "Human Sexual Response", featured Andrea Martin as Dr. Cheryl Kinsey (an allusion to the Kinsey Reports and Alfred Kinsey, their principal author) discussing how to fake an orgasm.
- The third sketch, "The Defense", featured Dave Thomas and was about a man defending himself for a heinous crime.
- The final sketch, "Van Kamp's Beans", is about the funeral of a man who died trying to obtain more beans. The sketch features Jayne Eastwood as "Widow Smedly", Dave Thomas as "Tony Ipanema", and Luciano Lutz as a priest.

Other performers appearing in the show include Valda Aviks, Jim Betts, Karl Blindheim, Valri Bromfield, Avril Chown, Beth Anne Cole, Nancy Dolman, Brian Doyle-Murray, Robin Duke, Patty Elsasser, Victor Garber, Marvin Hamlisch, Eugene Levy, Andrea Martin, Mary Ann McDonald, Derek McGrath, Catherine O'Hara, Carole Pope, Rosemary Radcliffe, Gerry Salsberg, Don Scardino, Stephen Schwartz, Charlene Shipp, Kevan Staples, Rudy Webb and Robin White.

== See also ==
- Gilda's Club
