= Roseanne Roseannadanna =

"Saturday Night Live" character created and portrayed by Gilda Radner

- Saturday Night Live character
- First appearance: October 29, 1977 ("Hire The Incompetent") January 21, 1978 (Weekend Update)
- Last appearance: May 24, 1980 (regular); February 15, 2015 (SNL 40)
- Created by: Gilda Radner
- Portrayed by: Gilda Radner; Emma Stone (SNL 40)

In-universe information
- Gender: Female
- Occupation: Television reporter
- Nationality: American

Roseanne Roseannadanna is a character created and portrayed by Gilda Radner on Weekend Update in the early seasons of Saturday Night Live (SNL). She was the segment's consumer affairs reporter who, like an earlier Radner character Emily Litella, editorialized on current issues, only to go off-topic before being interrupted by the anchor. Unlike Litella's meek and apologetic character, Roseannadanna was brash and tactless. The character was based on Rose Ann Scamardella, a former anchorwoman on WABC-TV's Eyewitness News in New York City. The character also appeared later in Radner's live one-woman shows.

== Routine ==
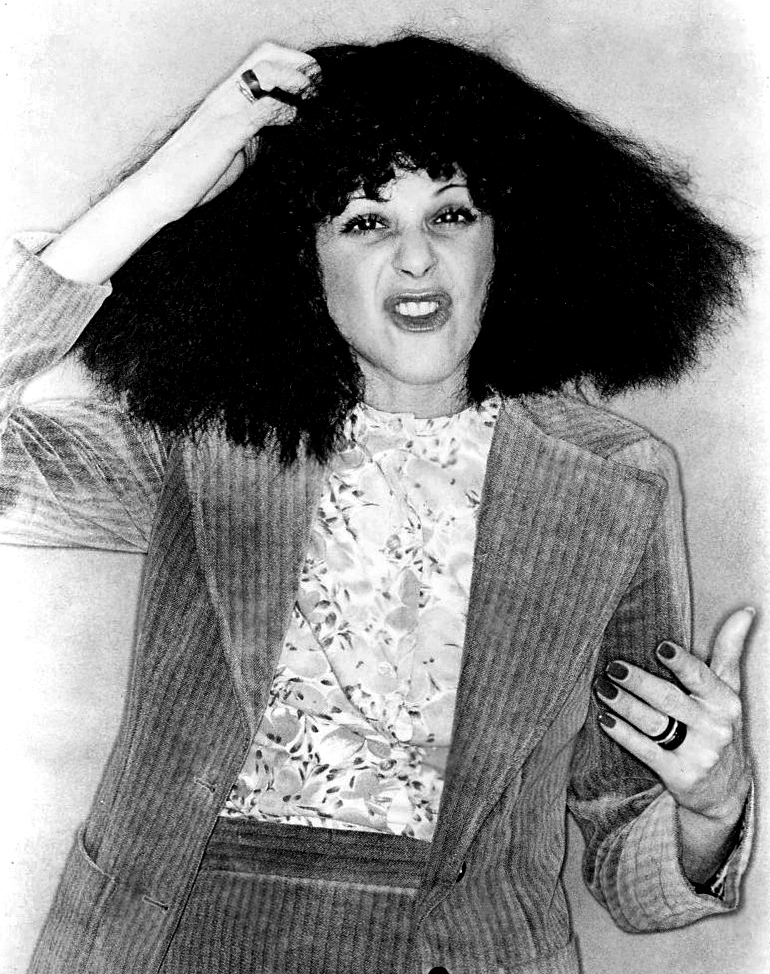
Radner as Roseanne Roseannadanna in 1980

Roseannadanna's Saturday Night Live commentary followed a strict formula. She usually read a letter from Richard Feder of Fort Lee, New Jersey — although she once read a letter from his wife, "Mrs." Richard Feder — and in at least one instance, from Miss Doris Powell.

The letter would include a series of questions, usually about a current social issue, to which Roseannadanna made derogatory comments about New Jersey before moving on to respond to the question. The name Richard Feder was an in-joke; it was the name of an actual resident of Fort Lee who also happened to be the brother-in-law of SNL writer and segment co-creator Alan Zweibel. The "character" Feder moved to Mount St. Helens, Washington, while the real Feder moved to West Nyack, New York, but later moved back to New Jersey, settling in Hamburg.

While answering the questions, Roseannadanna invariably digressed, launching into lengthy anecdotes, frequently having to do with an encounter with celebrities (Bo Derek, Dr. Joyce Brothers, Princess Grace, Gloria Vanderbilt, Lee Radziwill, etc.) which had no relevance to the topic at hand. Invariably, the story led to Roseannadanna going into graphic detail about bodily functions or personal hygiene. The concept was that the celebrities had told her the graphic stories and she was simply relating them to the audience. She also provided response to these stories, which was the rhetorical question and catch phrase: "What are ya tryin' to do, make me sick?!"

Eventually, the exasperated Weekend Update co-anchor Jane Curtin would interrupt, saying, "Roseanne, you're making me sick." Curtin would then ask Roseannadanna what her comments had to do with the question. Radner would reply: "Well, Jane, it just goes to show you, it's always something — if it’s not one thing, it's another."

Roseannadanna's comments wrapped up with the sharing of a piece of advice passed along by a family member, most often her father, but sometimes her "Nana Roseannadanna". In one episode, she mentioned her aunt "Pollyanna Roseannadanna", while in others, her "musically happening cousin Carlos Santana Roseannadanna", her religious aunt "Hosanna Roseannadanna", and her singing cousin "Lola Falana Roseannadanna", or school classmate "Hernando Roseannadando". In the final episode in which the character appeared, she mentioned her fashion designer aunt, "Murjani Roseannadanni".

== Characterization ==
Radner's character had a tendency to refer to herself by her full name whenever possible: "Mr. Feder, I know what you're talkin' about, because, I, Roseanne Roseannadanna, once had the same thing happen to me." She often exaggerated her tribulations, saying: "I thought I was gonna die!"

For example, she narrated a story about eating a hamburger in a restaurant and feeling something hard in it. She spat it out and found it was white and looked like a toenail, and she said: "I thought I was gonna die. I mean, what was a toenail doing in my hamburger?" Then she went to the restroom and, on the way, she saw Princess Lee Radziwill whom she described as the "classy lady that no one knows where she's the princess of." However, what the Princess didn't know was that she had a tiny piece of toilet paper hanging off her shoe, and she was walking around and the toilet paper hadn't fallen off. "I thought I was gonna be sick. So I said to her, 'Hey Princess Lee — what are ya tryin' to do, make me sick?' Jane Curtin then asked her what this had to do with anything, and Roseannadanna replied: "Well it just goes to show you, it's always something, you either got a toenail in your hamburger or toilet paper clinging to your shoe."

== After Saturday Night Live ==
In Radner's off-Broadway one-woman show, Gilda Radner – Live from New York (filmed as Gilda Live), she included a sketch where Roseanadanna is invited to give the commencement speech at Columbia University. After disclosing that she had not been the first choice for the commencement speech, and that the university only called her after Geraldo Rivera pulled out because he "had a boil that needed to be lanced", she attempts to prepare the new graduates for the hard road ahead by describing a job interview she once had with CBS, in which Walter Cronkite mistakenly thought that she'd "passed gas" and consequently kicked her out of his office.

Roseannadanna was later credited as "co-author" of Radner's book Roseanne Roseannadanna's Hey Get Back to Work. In the last year of her life, Radner released a memoir of her experience with ovarian cancer, entitled It's Always Something. Radner also recorded the memoir as an audio book, imitating Roseannadanna and some of her other SNL characters when describing parts of her life.

== List of SNL episodes featuring Roseanne Roseannadanna ==
- October 29, 1977 – Host: Charles Grodin (In this episode, Gilda's Roseanne Roseannadanna character was not on Weekend Update. She was in a fake commercial called "Hire The Incompetent", where she protested being fired from a fast food restaurant because her hair kept falling into the hamburgers on a grill.)
- January 21, 1978 – Host: Steve Martin
- January 28, 1978 – Host: Robert Klein
- February 25, 1978 – Host: O. J. Simpson
- March 18, 1978 – Host: Jill Clayburgh
- April 15, 1978 – Host: Michael Sarrazin
- May 13, 1978 – Host: Richard Dreyfuss
- October 7, 1978 – Host: The Rolling Stones
- November 18, 1978 – Host: Carrie Fisher
- December 16, 1978 – Host: Elliott Gould
- February 24, 1979 – Host: Kate Jackson
- April 7, 1979 – Host: Richard Benjamin
- May 26, 1979 – Host: Buck Henry
- October 20, 1979 – Host: Eric Idle
- December 22, 1979 – Host: Ted Knight
- March 15, 1980 – Host: No specific host
- May 24, 1980 – Host: Buck Henry
- February 15, 2015: Saturday Night Live 40th Anniversary Special, played by Emma Stone

The character also appeared in Radner's 1979 one-woman-show, Gilda Radner – Live from New York, filmed and released as Gilda Live.

- A bumper graphic in the November 12, 2011 episode showed Emma Stone (who was the host that night) as Roseanne with the 1980–81 SNL logo (used for the show's sixth season) on a plain lime background.

== See also ==
- Bennett Brauer
