= Ena Swansea =

American painter

- Born: 1966 (age 59–60); Charlotte, North Carolina, U.S.
- Education: University of South Florida
- Known for: Painting
- Spouses: Joel Siegel (1996–2007; his death); Antoine Guerrero
- Children: Dylan Siegel
- Awards: Hassam, Speicher, Betts and Symons Purchase Award; 2001 American Academy of Arts and Letters

Ena Swansea (born 1966) is an artist based in New York City. Her paintings often take memory as a point of departure.

== Early life ==
Swansea was born in Charlotte, North Carolina. Her parents, an architect and an editor, were Quakers active in the civil rights and anti-draft movements in the 1960s. She studied painting and film at the University of South Florida in Tampa.

== Work ==
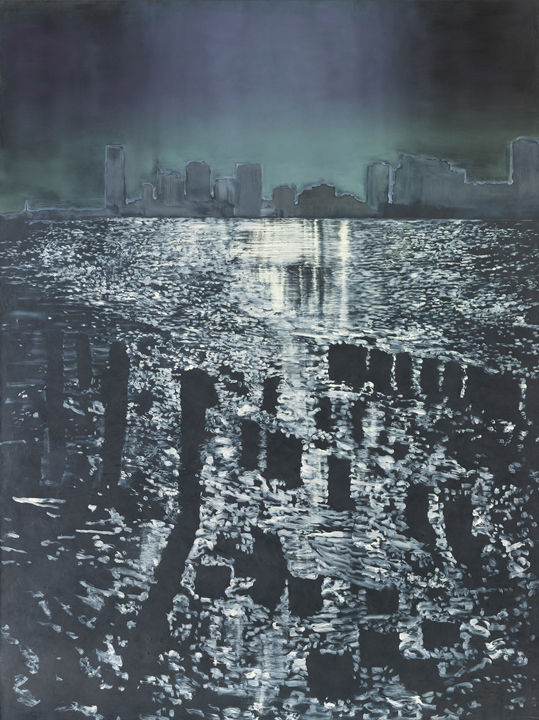
14th St pile field, 2010, 84 x 60 in, 213.4 x 152.4 cm

Swansea makes paintings in both oil and water based materials, extensively experimenting with their chemistry. As Barry Schwabsky describes in his 2017 review of Swansea's work in Artforum, "Swansea has developed an unusual technique of painting on a graphite-infused ground, which seems to situate everything in a darkly glimmering, indistinct twilit space; you might even call the resulting light effects Caravaggesque. On this ground, where brush marks often seem to float discretely, the paintings’ imagery may appear to be in a state of dissolution—but it never comes close to being unrecognizable." She works primarily in oil paint on a graphite foundation, often painting brightly colored figures on a dark iridescent background. The painter Luc Tuymans has described this unique effect between the interaction of oil and graphite in Swansea’s work "as if it had corroded through time.”

The paintings are high-contrast, with deep blacks, and both vibrant and muted colors. Both the palette and method of construction have been described as cinematic, privileging formal values over narrative, building and overwriting the image in a labor-intensive process.

Swansea often combines images in selections that eschew fixed meaning, with topical and cultural references. The fraught history of the American south, including gay and civil rights, are frequent topics, along with landscape and maritime images. Subjects are revisited over many years in a discursive examination of the contemporary world, including paintings of the Macy’s Day Parade and the first Nascar racetrack in North Carolina, still extant but now abandoned in a pine forest. In the painting area code from 2019, the depiction of a phone booth feels like a relic from the past in the age of cellular phones. Meticulously creating her images by hand, with each brushstroke visible, the painting subverts a mass movement towards digitization.

Ena Swansea, area code, 2019. Oil and acrylic on linen. 108 x 82 inches (274 x 208 cm). Santa Barbara Museum of Art.

Critic Belinda Grace Gardner says of Swansea's work, "Her compositions have the evasiveness of dreams or afterimages that briefly manifest themselves on the edges of perception." Similarly, author Oliver Koerner von Gustorf has written that Swansea’s paintings place this “American space in a hypnotic trance: she replaces the crystalline bright canvas with the darkness of a television screen switched off.”

Swansea is influenced by art history and her early work in film. The initial images come from a large archive of photographs, silos of repeating topics which forge a link between digital culture and painting. Growing up around architectural drawings and models, combined with her parents' 1960s psychedelic posters, and 19th-century woodcuts and engravings, resulted in a unique sensibility and visual heritage.

== Exhibitions ==
Swansea’s first exhibition was a 2-person show with Robert Miller at PS122 in the East Village in 1996, followed by a solo show in 1998. Her first museum survey was at the Musée d'Art Moderne Grand-Duc Jean (MUDAM), Luxembourg, in 2009, which selected paintings from the previous 5 years. Swansea's 2012 exhibition, Psycho, at the Deichtorhallen / Sammlung Falckenberg, was a selection of over 40 of Swansea's paintings from 2002–2012, chosen from various European collections.

Swansea has held solo exhibitions at Ben Brown Fine Arts in London and Hong Kong, Gaa Gallery of Cologne and Provincetown, Friedman Benda Gallery in New York, Locks Gallery in Philadelphia, 313 in Seoul, Berlin and Zurich; Arndt & Partner Gallery, Zurich; Robilant+Voena, St. Moritz, Robert Miller Gallery in New York, and Galerie Hans Mayer in Dusseldorf.

Selected group exhibitions include Manscaping, The Hole, New York, NY, and Los Angeles, CA (2022); Doomed and Famous: Selection from the Adrian Dannatt Collection, Miguel Abreu Gallery, New York, NY (2021); De la Tauromaquia à la Goyesque, Hommage à Francisco de Goya, Musée des Cultures Taurines Henriette et Claude Viallat, Nîmes (2019); Against Forgetting I, Gaa Gallery Provincetown, MA (2018); The Grass is Green, Gaa Gallery Cologne Project Space, Cologne (2016); Sight unseen, Ellen Harvey and Ena Swansea, Locks Gallery, Philadelphia, PA (2015); Friedman Benda Gallery, New York (2014); Zürcher Gallery, New York (2013); 313 Gallery, Seoul (2013); Psycho, 41 paintings from 2002 - 2011 in European collections, Deichtorhallen/Sammlung Falckenberg, Hamburg, (2012); ARNDT Berlin, New York,(2011); Bertrand Delacroix Gallery, New York (2011); Water is Best Locks Gallery, Philadelphia (2009); Naked!, Kasmin Gallery, New York (2009); the beginning, 313 Gallery, Seoul, Korea (2009); True Romance - Allegories of Love from the Renaissance to the Present, Kunsthalle Vienna (2008); Symbolism, Von der Heydt Museum, Wuppertal, Germany (2007); Back to the Figure - Contemporary Painting, Museum Franz Gertsch, Burgdorf, Switzerland (2006); Goetz meets Falckenberg, Sammlung Falckenberg, Hamburg (2005); The Triumph of Painting part 3, Saatchi Gallery in London (2005); Greater New York, MoMAPS1, New York (2005); Story-Tellers, Kunsthalle Hamburg (2005); and Central Station at La Maison Rouge in Paris (2004).

== Collections ==
Swansea's work is included in several public collections, including the Museum of Modern Art, New York; The Santa Barbara Museum of Art; the Galerie Neue Meister Dresden; Deichtorhallen, Sammlung Falckenberg, Hamburg; the Olbricht Collection, Berlin; Cornell University's Herbert F. Johnson Museum of Art, Ithaca, NY; Boca Raton Museum of Art, Boca Raton, FL and the Colby College Museum of Art, Waterville, ME.

== Awards and publications ==
Swansea is the recipient of a 2001 Hassam, Speicher, Betts and Symons Purchase Award from the American Academy of Arts and Letters.

Critical writing on Swansea's work has been published internationally, including Artforum, Art in America, monopol, Parkett, The Art Newspaper, The Brooklyn Rail, Flash Art, Fantom, The New York Sun, ArtNet, ARTinvestor, and Art – Das Kunstmagazin.

Publications include Ena Swansea, green light (London: Ben Brown Fine Arts, 2021); Ena Swansea, recent paintings (London: Ben Brown Fine Arts, 2018); Ena Swansea – new painting (New York: André Schlechtriem Temporary Inc., 2008); The Triumph of Painting (London: Randomhouse, 2004); Compass in Hand: Selections from the Judith Rothschild Contemporary Drawings Collection, Catalogue Raisonné (New York: The Museum of Modern Art, 2009); Central Station, collection of Harald Falckenberg, à La Maison Rouge (Paris: Fage èditions, 2004); and Ena Swansea, Reality of Shadows (Philadelphia: Locks Gallery, 2002).

== Public projects ==
In 2010, Swansea was selected as the first American artist to produce a “Goyesque” occupying the entire sand floor of the ancient Roman bullfighting arena in Arles. The ephemeral painting, 150 x 300 feet, existed for about an hour, erased by the feet of bulls and matadors.

In 2016, Swansea participated in an invitational exhibition which involved redesigning an Upper East Side apartment, entitled “Be My Guest: The Art of Interiors”, closely collaborating with Mickalene Thomas, Misha Kahn, and five other artists. Swansea’s contributions were custom reversible sofas, whose imagery is based upon the artist’s paintings.

== Personal life ==
Swansea is married to Antoine Guerrero, who is in charge of special projects at LUMA Arles, and former Director of Operations and Exhibitions at MoMAPS1. Swansea is the widow of film critic Joel Siegel with whom she has a son, Dylan Siegel (b. 1998).
