= Gilda's Club =

Community organization for cancer patients, survivors, and their families and friends

- Formation: 1995
- Founder: Joanna Bull, Gene Wilder, Joel Siegel and other family and friends of Gilda Radner
- Type: Non-profit
- Legal status: 501(c)(3)
- Purpose: Support, educate, and empower cancer patients and their families - so no one has to face cancer alone.
- Region served: USA

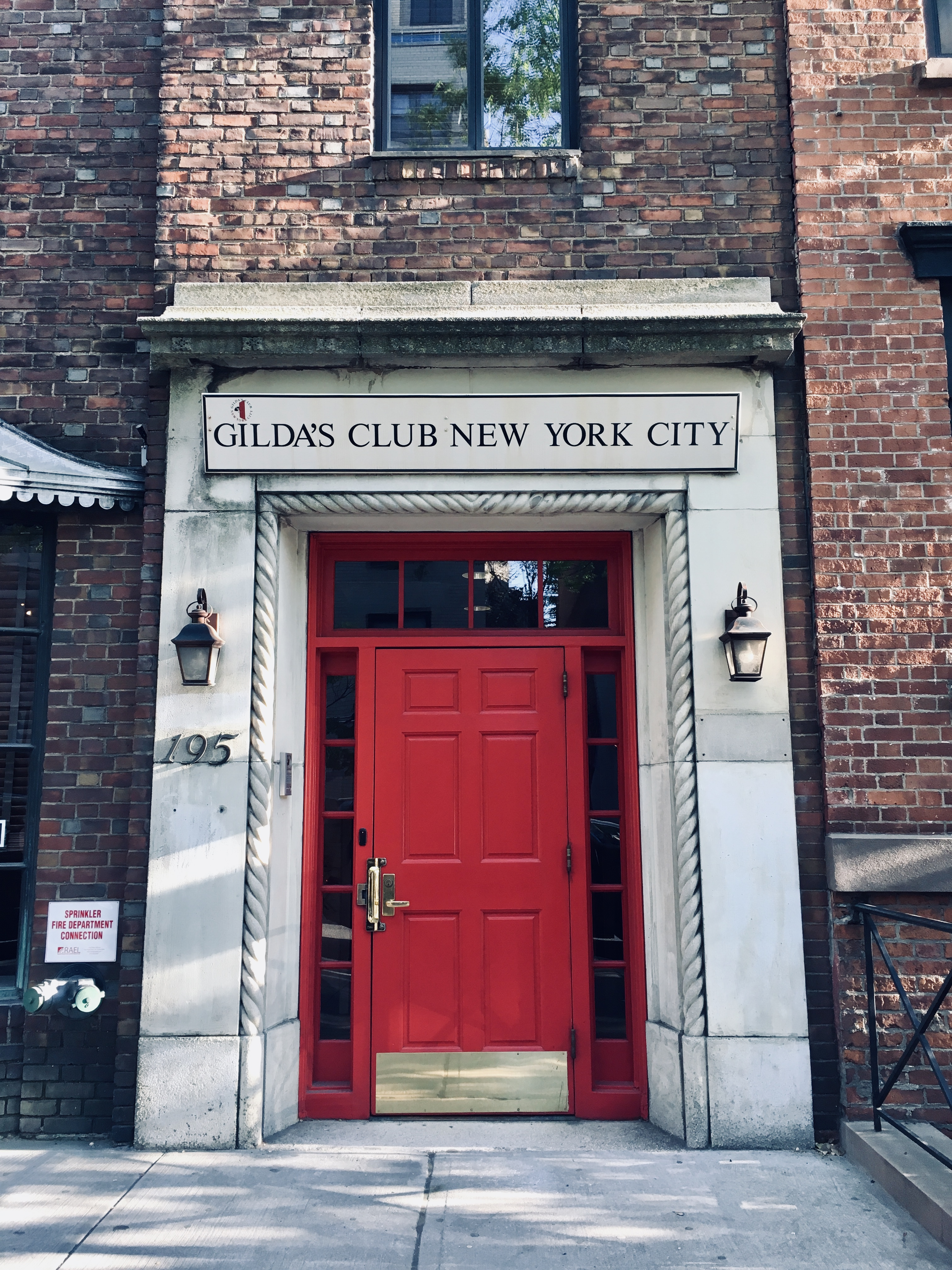
Gilda's Club New York City

Gilda's Club is a community organization for people with cancer, their families and friends. Local chapters provide meeting places where those who have cancer, their families, and friends can join with others to build emotional and social support as a supplement to medical care. Free of charge and nonprofit, Gilda's Club chapters offer support and networking groups, lectures, workshops and social events in a nonresidential, homelike setting. The club was named in honor of the original Saturday Night Live cast member Gilda Radner, who died of ovarian cancer in 1989.

In 2009, Gilda's Club merged with The Wellness Community to form the Cancer Support Community, although local branches generally opted to retain the name Gilda's Club. Gilda's Clubs generates funds to support its programs through events often hosted by notable figures.

== History ==
Gilda's Club was founded by Joanna Bull, Radner's cancer psychotherapist and co-founded with Radner's widower, Gene Wilder (himself a cancer survivor) and broadcaster Joel Siegel (who would himself fight colon cancer until his death in 2007). Joanna Bull started the project with just $10,000 and networked in the New York cancer support community. She became the executive director of the first club opened in New York City in 1995, after a long fundraising campaign that included movie trailers featuring Wilder in theaters around the country who acted as the celebrity spokesman. The organization took its name from Radner's comment that cancer gave her "membership to an elite club I'd rather not belong to". Radner's story can be read in her book, It's Always Something.

Gilda's Club is famous for its signature red doors meant to symbolize Radner's "vibrancy".

Each club is required to meet certain criteria before being approved for a new location. These specific criteria includes: accessibility- each club must be near public transportation and have easy highway access, generate $1 million in fundraising prior to opening, and adhere to approved wellness therapies. Following these guidelines, Minnesota opened a Gilda's Club after raising $3.8 million in 8 years.

In 1998 Chicago opened its first Gilda's club, since then it has expanded to 4 new locations in the Chicago area.

In July 2009, Gilda’s Club Worldwide merged with The Wellness Community, another established cancer support organization to create the Cancer Support Community (CSC).

As of 2012, there are over 20 Gilda’s Club clubhouses. Although some local affiliates of Gilda’s Club and The Wellness Community have retained their names, many affiliates have adopted the name Cancer Support Community following the merger. The proposed name change caused controversy in some communities. Upon hearing the news, Radner's late husband, Gene Wilder, commented that she would have been upset with the name change, saying, "she would have cried." The national organization introduced a web-based diagnostic "distress screening" tool which led the Pittsburgh Gilda's Club to change its name and sever its ties with the national organization because of a disagreement over requirements to offer the screening tool to all patients.

In 2019, due to financial struggles, The Lake House, a non-profit organization for cancer support, merged with Gilda's Club Detroit. This offered another Gilda's Club location in Detroit that allowed for the expansion of the Club's reach.

In 2021, the club in Evansville, Indiana, dissolved its relationship with Gilda's Club saying the association with the national group was too costly. The chapter was renamed Cancer Pathways Midwest.

In August 2026, the club in Toronto, Ontario abruptly closed after the Canada Revenue Agency revoked its charitable status for failing to file required information with the federal agency. The club's Southeastern Ontario branch had its charitable status revoked in 2018 over the same issue.

== Celebrities Associated ==
Numerous celebrities and notable figures have associated themselves with Gilda’s Club. The most notable figure is Gene Wilder, co-founder of Gilda’s Club, and Gilda Radner’s husband.

In 1996, former Northwestern University president Leontine Chuang and Princess Diana attended a lunch with various members of Gilda’s Club Chicago. Princess Diana’s visit in 1996 helped bring awareness to Annie Lurie allowing for Gilda’s Club Chicago to become what it is today.

In 2017, the English comedian Ricky Gervais, made a generous donation of $10,000 to Gilda’s Club Chicago as a thank you to the city for selling out his two shows.

In 2018, The Anthony Rizzo Family Foundation, founded by the Chicago Cubs first baseman, partnered up with Gilda’s Club Chicago to provide children living with cancer or having a family member with cancer, a free 5-day summer camp for almost 40 kids between the ages of 13 and 19.

In 2018, Nicky Delmonico, Chicago White Sox outfielder, alongside girlfriend Tiffany Maher from Fox tv show So You Think You Can Dance attended the dance class “BeMoved” to show support for those suffering from cancer in association with Gilda's Club Chicago.

In November 2019, former Saturday Night Live cast member Vanessa Bayer was presented with the Gilda Radner Award at Gilda’s Club NYC gala. More than $850,000 was raised at the gala which will go towards providing free cancer support to those in need.

== Recent Events ==
Gilda's Club hosts a number of events which include; concert benefits, group workouts, and comedy shows. All of these events have been put together in the past to benefit the club and raise money to continue their services. Some events are held annually. Gilda’s Club Chicago hosts a yearly teen essay contest that aims to help high school students who are battling cancer or have a connection to it. This essay contest is supposed to help those young people find themselves in a creative way.

In 2000, Northwestern University held a dance marathon that raised almost $400,000 for the Chicago club.

In 2009, Gilda's Club Metro Detroit hosted its first annual "Bras for a Cause" fundraising event. The event features a live and silent auction for crafted bras that are also worn by breast cancer survivors in a runway fashion show. In 2018, "Bras for a Cause" raised almost a million dollars.

A “Night of a Thousand Noogies” is an event hosted by the Chicago club annually. The Second City Improv Club participates in the event by performing a unique improv comedy show. The night is filled with sketches, a silent auction, food, and drinks. The event raises money used to support more than 300 free activities each month. The attendees of the event must wear all red in honor of Gilda’s Club. In 2016, the event saw close to 250 attendees. Each ticket was sold for $75 and VIP tickets were sold for $125. By the end of the night, Gilda’s Club raised over $50,000.

Actor George Wendt, famously known from Cheers, hosted a benefit in 2017 that allowed people who he had worked with in the entertainment industry to roast him. His nephew, Jason Sudeikis, emceed the event that raised money for Gilda's Club Chicago, as well as for the Second City Improv Club.

In honor of Gilda’s Club Chicago's 20th anniversary, they held a party and awards dinner to celebrate serving more than 45,000 people and raising over $25 million.

Gilda's Club Grand Rapids hosts LaughFest, an annual comedy stand-up festival to raise money for the club. 2020 will be LaughFest's 10th anniversary.

== Locations ==
Gilda's Club serves communities across the United States and Canada. Some locations include:

1. Chicago, Illinois
2. New York City
3. Detroit, Michigan
4. Twin Cities, Minnesota
5. Quad Cities
6. South Florida
7. Grand Rapids, Michigan
8. Louisville, Kentucky
9. Middle Tennessee
10. South Jersey
11. Kansas City, Missouri
12. Greater Philadelphia
13. St. Louis, Missouri
14. Rochester, New York
15. Madison, Wisconsin
16. Barrie, Ontario

== See also ==
- Friends of Gilda
