= Cancer Support Community =

US non-profit organization

The Cancer Support Community (CSC) focuses on three areas of support: direct service delivery, research, and advocacy.

The organization includes an international network of Affiliates that offer social and emotional support for people impacted by cancer, as well as a community of support available online and over the phone. Its Research and Training Institute conducts psychosocial, behavioral and survivorship research. CSC furthers its focus on patient advocacy through the Cancer Policy Institute.

== History ==
The Cancer Support Community formed in 2009 following the merger of The Wellness Community and Gilda's Club The Wellness Community was founded in 1982 by Harold and Harriet Benjamin with Shannon McGowan in California. They wanted to create something that had previously been missing in cancer care—an organization that would provide social and emotional support to cancer patients, their families, friends and caregivers. Gilda's Club was founded in 1991 in honor of Saturday Night Live comedian and former ovarian cancer patient, Gilda Radner, after her death, by her husband, Gene Wilder, and Joanna Bull with other friends and family. Gilda's Club opened locations to provide social and emotional support for people living with cancer nationwide while the Wellness Community locations remained on the West Coast.

In 2007 the Institute of Medicine released a pivotal report on the importance of addressing the social and emotional needs of individuals living with cancer, which was a practice both the Wellness Community and Gilda's Club had been implementing for years. Not long after, to be able to better serve more individuals living with cancer, the Wellness Community and Gilda's Club merged to become the Cancer Support Community.

== Programs and services ==
=== Support ===
CSC provides a toll-free Cancer Support Helpline which takes calls from patients, families and health professionals seeking information, access to local and national resources, and counseling. An online chat service is also part of the support services. CSC also hosts an online support group called the Living Room. The community includes message boards and professional facilitated online support groups.

=== Affiliate Network ===
The Cancer Support Affiliate Network consists of 42 licensed affiliates, 150 satellite locations and a growing number of health care partnerships. Affiliates provide programs free of charge to anyone affected by cancer, including patients, survivors, caregivers, loved ones and children. These programs include support groups, short-term individual counseling, social activities, resource and referral services, educational sessions and health and wellness programs.

=== Educational resources ===
CSC produces the Frankly Speaking About Cancer program series in several formats to meet the educational needs of patients and families. The series includes eBooks, print material, videos, webinars and a podcast.

=== Online support ===
The Living Room is CSC's online support group in the form of message boards and support groups. People impacted by cancer can join, post to the message boards, or find a support group.

== Research ==
The Cancer Support Community established the Research and Training Institute (RTI) to conduct psychosocial, behavioral and survivorship research for people living with cancer. The goal of the research is to provide improved resources to individuals touched by cancer.

The Cancer Support Community uses evidence-based interventions to improve the patient experience by adding to the body of psychosocial research, developing tools and education resources.

Among their key research programs and services are:

- CSC's Cancer Experience Registry is an IRB-approved survey forum that enables people impacted by cancer to share their experiences and identify issues that impact their lives. By participating in this ongoing survey, participants have the opportunity to use their own experiences with cancer to inform the way that nonprofits, hospitals, medical organizations, and other groups can better approach cancer care in the future. CSC's RTI group uses the information from the surveys filled out by participants to improve the care both for people with cancer and their caregivers, who could also be affected financially, physically, and emotionally by the extent of commitment taking care of a loved one with cancer may require. Through CSC's research, the Cancer Experience Registry has offered a few discoveries concerning some of the key problems facing cancer patients, caregivers, and anyone else affected by a diagnosis. They found that patients with breast cancer are at disproportionate risk for a lack of career security, that almost half of cancer patients surveyed likely had clinical levels of depression, that surveyed caregivers often do not feel ready enough to take on the emotional needs of their loved ones with cancer diagnoses, and that most of the patients surveyed do not recall having conversations with any physician or care team member about treatment costs or plans. CSC's Cancer Experience Registry finds correlations such as these in the surveys they distribute to make informed decisions about what, who, and why to advocate for certain improvements in cancer care according to the issues most pressing to patients, caregivers, and their families.
- CSC offers a decision support counseling program called Open to Options that can help patients prepare for an appointment in which they will be making a treatment decision. According to CSC's website, Open to Options allows patients to feel confident talking to their physician about the things that matter most to them. Specialists can help patients come up with questions, concerns, and expectations for how appointments might go so they can come prepared with the tools they need to make prognosis as smooth and supportive as possible.
- CancerSupportSource is a distress screening, referral and follow-up program developed and implemented by CSC. It was created to identify the specific psychosocial concerns experienced by a patient and provide a tailored and desired response. The screening program particularly attempts to understand each patients' mental health status so that prognosis options going forward address the potential of clinical mental illness. CancerSupportSource is mainly used as a predictor for anxiety and depression. A clarifying study by CSC of the screening test identified five main factors integrated within it to determine the severity of any mental health concerns, including "(1) emotional well-being, (2) symptom burden and impact, (3) body image and healthy lifestyle, (4) health care team communication, and (5) relationships and intimacy". By analyzing these factors in context with each patient's needs, CancerSupportSource allows cancer patients and physicians to integrate mental health services, social support, or any other relevant treatment plans which may help someone dealing with both cancer and potentially clinical depression or anxiety.

== Policy and advocacy ==
The Cancer Policy Institute at the Cancer Support Community works with advisors and friends to advocate the mandate that comprehensive, quality cancer care includes medical care, as well as social and emotional care. The Cancer Policy Institute has initiatives, training opportunities, learning materials, and events. CSC's Grassroots Advocacy Network is open to anyone to join. The network provides a place to learn more about key issues that are important to cancer patients and their loved ones, and make one's voice heard at a local and national level. CSC positions include: access to care for all patients, quality as a central theme, and research as a critical priority.

== Use of funds ==
In 2015, the Cancer Support Community reported $8,731,796 net assets at the end of the year. In the same year, CSC reported $5,981,094 on expenses. Of those expenses, 82% went to programs and services, 9% went to management and general, and the other 9% went to general fundraising.

== Evaluations and ratings ==
The Cancer Support Community has received numerous high-level charity ratings including the following:

- The GuideStar Exchange Gold Participant distinction
- Charity Navigator 4-star rating
- The Independent Charities Seal of Excellence
- Named a Top Nonprofit Organization by Philanthropedia
