= Joel Siegel =

American film critic (1943–2007)

- Siegel in 2004
- Born: Joel Steven Siegel; July 7, 1943; Los Angeles, California, U.S.
- Died: June 29, 2007 (aged 63); New York City, U.S.
- Education: University of California, Los Angeles
- Occupation: Television journalist/Film critic
- Notable credit: Good Morning America Entertainment Editor (1981–2007)
- Spouse(s): Karen Oshman (1969–1970; divorced); Jane Kessler (1976–1982; her death); Melissa DeMayo (1985–?; divorced); Ena Swansea (1996–2007; his death; 1 child)
- Children: 1

Joel Steven Siegel (July 7, 1943 – June 29, 2007) was an American film critic for the ABC morning news show Good Morning America for over 25 years. The winner of multiple Emmy Awards, Siegel also worked as a radio disc jockey and an advertising copywriter.

== Early life and education ==
Born to a Jewish family of Romanian-Jewish origins, Siegel was raised in Los Angeles. He graduated cum laudefrom the University of California, Los Angeles. His Romanian-born grandmother from Botoşani survived the Triangle Shirtwaist Factory fire in March 1911. During college, Siegel worked to register black voters in Georgia during the Civil Rights Movement, and he spoke frequently of having met Martin Luther King Jr. He also worked as a joke writer for Senator Robert F. Kennedy and was at the Ambassador Hotel the night the senator was assassinated. According to some reports, he also led student opposition to the construction of a football stadium on campus.

== Career ==
=== Early work ===
Siegel worked at a range of jobs throughout the 1960s, often concentrating on the civil rights movement. In the late '60s, before moving to New York, he worked as an advertising agency copy-writer and producer. While working in advertising for Carson/Roberts Advertising, he invented and named ice cream flavors for Baskin-Robbins. These flavors were: German Chocolate Cake; Peaches & Cream; Pralines & Cream; Blueberry Cheesecake; Strawberry Cheesecake; Green Cheesecake; Red, White and Blueberry; and Chilly Burgers.

He began working in radio as a disc jockey and newscaster, while continuing to freelance in advertising. Through his freelance work, he was offered the book review position with the Los Angeles Times.

Siegel's essays in the Los Angeles Times Sunday Magazine were spotted by a CBS executive, and Siegel was hired as a feature correspondent for WCBS-TV in New York. Joel created signature work teamed with a producer who later became an executive at WABC-TV's Eyewitness News. When Siegel's producer moved, he offered Siegel a featured on-air position, and Joel accepted. Siegel proposed to Eyewitness News management that he become a film and theatre critic. He suggested that he would innovate the form by using brief clips from the movie or show being reviewed as drop-ins into his reviews, working them into his scripts as gags to create a new, witty form of review. Siegel, during his years at WCBS-TV, also created features on the AM radio side for WCBS (880) known as Joel Siegel's New York.

In 1986, Spy magazine derided Siegel as "the poor man's Gene Shalit", who relied "heavily on alliteration."

=== Good Morning America and later career ===
In 1981, he joined Good Morning America (GMA) as a film critic. While Siegel worked at his reviewing, he wrote the book for The First, a Broadway musical based on the story of Jackie Robinson, for which he received a Tony Award nomination in 1982. This marks him as the only drama critic to receive this nomination. In 1999, Siegel was also one of the many guest critics on Roger Ebert's show At The Movies as a replacement for Gene Siskel following his death. Siegel was also a good friend of Roger Ebert.

== Personal life ==
=== Marriages ===
Siegel's second wife, Jane Kessler, died from a brain tumor in 1982. In 1991, he joined with the actor Gene Wilder to found Gilda's Club, a nonprofit organization that provided social support for cancer patients and their families in honor of Wilder's wife, Gilda Radner.

On June 21, 1996, Siegel married his fourth wife, artist Ena Swansea. In 1997, at 53 years, he was diagnosed with colorectal cancer. One week after being diagnosed, Siegel found out he would be a father for the first time. He wrote the book Lessons for Dylan which shares the ups and downs of his life with his young son, as he might not live long enough to relate those stories in person. Siegel underwent surgery, radiation, and chemotherapy. He welcomed his newborn son, Dylan Thomas Jefferson Swansea Siegel, home on the same day he completed his chemotherapy treatments. Two years later, a CAT scan revealed a lesion on Siegel's left lung. After a pulmonary lobectomy and additional chemotherapy, Siegel continued to work on GMA.

=== Activism ===
Siegel was an outspoken supporter of the subject of colon cancer. In 2005, he spoke at a meeting of C-Change, a group of cancer experts from government, business, and nonprofit sectors, chaired by former president George H. W. Bush and former First Lady Barbara Bush. He testified before the Senate during Colorectal Cancer Awareness month, March 2005. "I came here from New York City this morning hoping that I would encourage someone to have a colonoscopy so that they would not have to go through what I went through", he told a Senate panel. In June 2005, Siegel published a letter in the peer-reviewed cancer medicine journal, The Oncologist entitled, "One at a Time". It shares his cancer diagnosis and experiences to that date.

On May 10, 2007, less than two months before his death, he spoke before the CEO Roundtable on Cancer, an association of corporate executives that was formed when former president George H. W. Bush asked corporate America to do something "bold and venturesome" about cancer. Bush and his wife Barbara were in the audience when Joel spoke on May 10 at the Essex House in New York City. He began and ended his presentation by saying, "I want to thank you for what you are doing for cancer patients."

=== Death ===
Siegel died from metastatic colon cancer on June 29, 2007, shortly before what would have been his 64th birthday. Following his death, Roger Ebert wrote a tribute to Joel and stated in the tribute that Joel was "a brave man, and a hell of a nice guy."

== Awards ==
Siegel received five New York Emmy Awards and a public service award from the Anti-Defamation League of B'nai B'rith and the New York State Associated Press Broadcasters Association Award for general excellence in individual reporting.

== Works ==
- Siegel, Joel. Lessons for Dylan: On Life, Love, the Movies, and Me. PublicAffairs, 2003. ISBN 978-1-58648-127-8
