= Hanky Panky (1982 film) =

1982 film by Sidney Poitier

- Theatrical release poster
- Directed by: Sidney Poitier
- Written by: Henry Rosenbaum; David Taylor
- Produced by: Martin Ransohoff
- Starring: Gene Wilder; Gilda Radner; Kathleen Quinlan; Richard Widmark; Robert Prosky
- Cinematography: Arthur J. Ornitz
- Edited by: Harry Keller
- Music by: Tom Scott
- Production company: Columbia Pictures
- Distributed by: Columbia Pictures
- Release date: June 4, 1982
- Running time: 103 minutes
- Country: United States
- Language: English
- Budget: $14 million
- Box office: $9 million (domestic)

Hanky Panky is a 1982 American comedy thriller Metrocolor film directed by Sidney Poitier, starring Gene Wilder and Gilda Radner.

== Plot ==
Michael Jordon, an architect, accidentally becomes involved in a web of intrigue and murder when a strange woman, who enters a taxi with him, is later found murdered. As a result, he flees from false murder charges. Kate is a woman out to find her brother's killer. Although she and Michael initially believe the other is a killer, they realize otherwise and become a team. They undertake a wild cross-country ride from New York City to the Grand Canyon.

== Cast ==
- Gene Wilder as Michael Jordon
- Gilda Radner as Kate Hellman
- Kathleen Quinlan as Janet Dunn
- Richard Widmark as Ransom
- Robert Prosky as Hiram Calder
- Beau Starr as Cop Passenger
- Josef Sommer as Adrian Pruitt
- Victor Argo as Pallbearer
- Jay O. Sanders as Katz
- Johnny Sekka as Lacey
- Pat Corley as Puckett

== Production ==
The film was developed as a follow-up to the successful Gene Wilder-Richard Pryor film Stir Crazy. However, Pryor chose not to participate and Gilda Radner was brought in as a replacement, with the script rewritten for her role. Wilder and Radner met during filming and later married.

Locations include Parc East, Knickerbocker Club, Madison Square Garden, Roosevelt Hotel, Ware Hall, Cambridge, Massachusetts, New England Aquarium, and Grand Canyon National Park.

== Reception ==
Vincent Canby, writing in The New York Times, gave the film a mixed review, saying it "is apt to leave you far less exhilarated than exhausted."

Richard Schickel noted that a scene of Michael packing his bag included "a funny, human moment, and if Hanky Panky had 30 or 40 more of them it might have been a congenial little picture."

Variety wrote: "a limp romantic suspense comedy which manages to be neither romantic, suspenseful nor funny...appears to be an attempt to duplicate the classy thrills of North by Northwest..."

On the review aggregator website Rotten Tomatoes, 42% of 12 critics' reviews are positive.

== Novelization ==
A $2.50 paperback novelization of the screenplay was published by Pinnacle Books, in July 1982, by Leslie Jarreau, possibly a pseudonym. The book is copyrighted by, Henry Rosenbaum and David Taylor, the screenwriters.

== See also ==
- List of American films of 1982
