= Susan Ruskin =

American film producer

Susan Ruskin is a film producer. She was appointed dean of the American Film Institute conservatory in 2019, and has previously served as the dean of the University of North Carolina School of Filmmaking.

== Selected filmography ==
- The Woman in Red (1984)
- Haunted Honeymoon (1986)
- Anaconda (1997)
