= The Wellness Community =

US-based non-profit organization

The Wellness Community (TWC) was an international, non-profit organization that provided support and education to people with cancer and their caregivers. In 2009, the organization merged with Gilda's Club, forming the Cancer Support Community.

== History ==
The Wellness Community was founded in Santa Monica in 1982 by Harold Benjamin, his wife Harriet Benjamin and Shannon McGowan. The organization provided professionally led support groups, educational workshops, and other programs. In addition to providing support groups, education and other programs, TWC conducted research to quantify and document the benefits of psychosocial support for people with cancer. Research was conducted in collaboration with Catholic University, M.D. Anderson Cancer Center, Rutgers University, Stanford University, University of California, Los Angeles, and University of California, San Francisco.

== Cancer Support Community merger ==
In 2009, it merged with Gilda's Club to form the Cancer Support Community. The merger was reportedly intended to increase the operational efficiency of both organizations, each with 25 affiliates, and to reduce operational costs.
