= Ware Hall =

- U.S. National Register of Historic Places
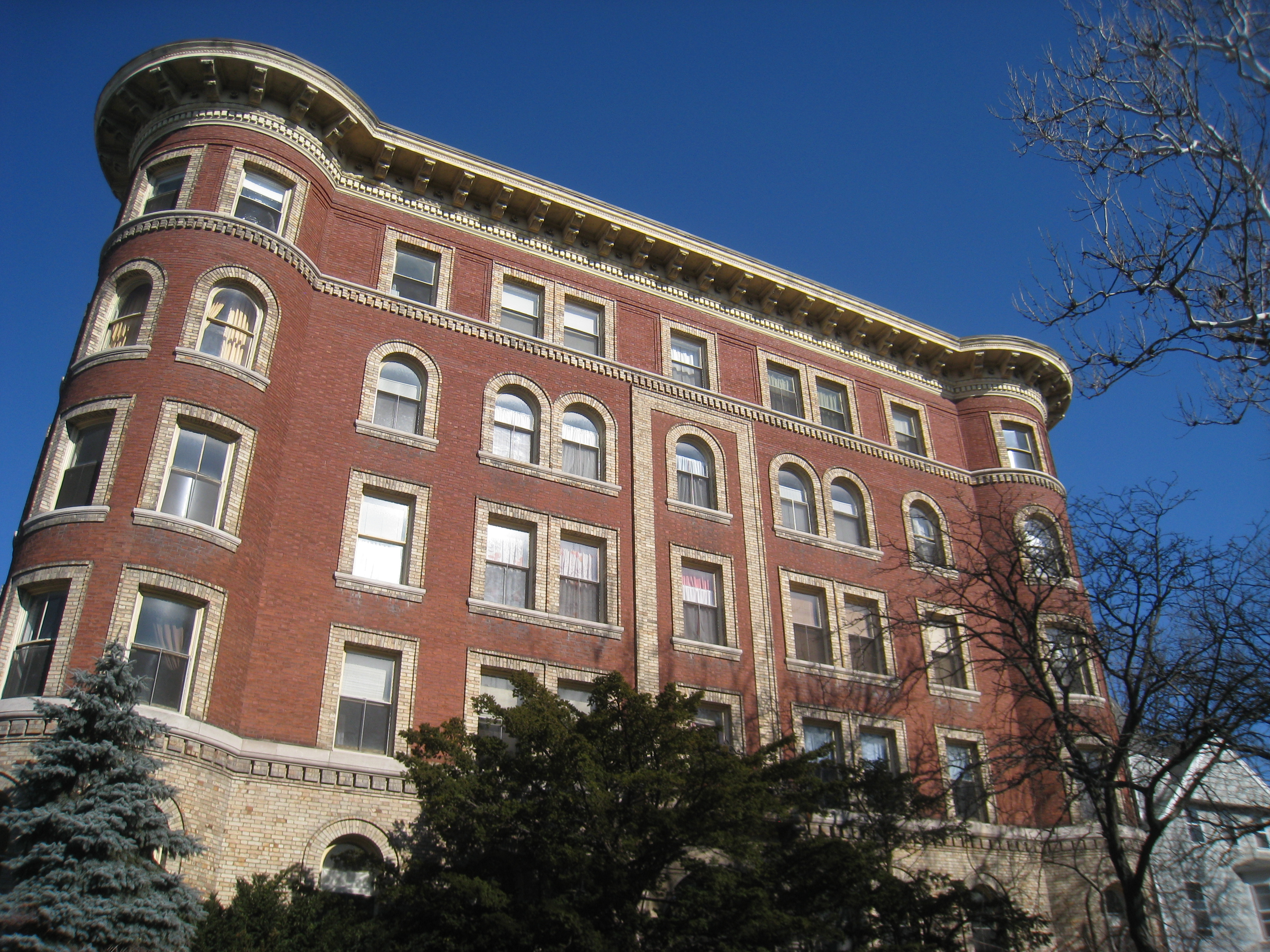

- Location within Massachusetts Location within the United States
- Location: Cambridge, Massachusetts
- Coordinates: 42°22′19″N 71°06′47″W
- Built: 1893
- Architect: George Fogerty
- Architectural style: Classical Revival
- MPS: Cambridge MRA
- NRHP reference No.: 83000835
- Added to NRHP: June 30, 1983

Ware Hall is an historic residential apartment building at 383 Harvard Street in Cambridge, Massachusetts. It was designed by local architect George Fogerty and built in 1893. Fogerty was also the architect of Claverly Hall, a similar building, on Mount Auburn Street. This five story brick Classical Revival building is a rare example of an apartment house built in Mid Cambridge that was designed to cater to Harvard University students. Apartment blocks of this quality were generally built closer to the Harvard campus, so this one stands out when compared to other apartment house in its immediate surroundings.

Ware Hall was viewed as one of the most luxurious lodging options for Harvard students at the time of its construction, and some saw it in terms of changing student preferences. As one newspaper wrote, "It will not do to tell the freshmen of today that a ramshackle room that he is shown was once occupied by Daniel Webster or Thomas Jefferson."

The foundation was in granite, the first story is of light Scotch brick, and the belts on the first and fourth stories are Indiana limestone.

At the time of its construction, it was the first dormitory to include a passenger elevator.

The building was listed on the National Register of Historic Places in 1983.

== See also ==
- National Register of Historic Places listings in Cambridge, Massachusetts
